= List of windmills in Aude =

A list of windmills in Aude, France

Location	Name of mill	Type	Built	Notes	Photograph
Alairac	Moulin a Alairac	Moulin Tour		Moulins-a-Vent (in French)	
Alzonne-Villelisses	Moulin a Villelisses	Moulin Tour		Moulins-a-Vent (in French)	
Arzens	Moulin a Arzens	Moulin Tour		Moulins-a-Vent (in French)	
Arzens	Moulin près d'Arzens	Moulin Tour		Moulins-a-Vent (in French)	
Badens	Moulin a Badens	Moulin Tour		Moulins-a-Vent (in French)	
Bagnoles	Moulin a Bagnoles	Moulin Tour		Moulins-a-Vent (in French)	
Baraigne	Moulin Neuf	Moulin Tour		Moulins-a-Vent (in French)	
Bizanet	Moulin a Bizanet	Moulin Tour		Moulins-a-Vent (in French)	
Bram	Moulin a Bram	Moulin Tour		Moulins-a-Vent (in French)	
Capendu	Moulin de Patane	Moulin Tour		Moulins-a-Vent (in French)	
Carcassonne	Moulins de Carcassonne	Moulin Tour		Moulins-a-Vent (in French)	
Carlipa	Moulins de Carlipa	Moulin Tour		Moulins-a-Vent (in French)	
Castelnaudary	Moulin Cugarel	Moulin Tour	17th century	Moulins-a-Vent (in French)	
Castelnaudary	Ancien Moulin	Moulin Tour		Moulins-a-Vent (in French)	
Cavanac	Moulins de Cavanac	Moulin Tour		Two mills Moulins-a-Vent (in French)	
Conilhac-Corbières	Moulin de Condamine	Moulin Tour		Moulins-a-Vent (in French)	
Couffoulens	Moulins de Couffoulens	Moulin Tour		Three mills Moulins-a-Vent (in French)	
Coustouge	Moulin de Coustouge	Moulin Tour		Moulins-a-Vent (in French)	
Cucugnan	Moulin d'Omer	Moulin Tour		Moulins-a-Vent (in French)	
La Digne-d'Amont	Moulin a Digne d'Amont	Moulin Tour		Moulins-a-Vent (in French)	
La Digne-d'Aval	Moulin a Digne d'Aval	Moulin Tour		Moulins-a-Vent (in French)	
Douzens	Moulin a Douzens	Moulin Tour		Moulins-a-Vent (in French)	
Escales	Moulin d'Escales	Moulin Tour	1621	Moulins-a-Vent (in French)	
Fabrezan	Moulin de Fabrezan	Moulin Tour		Moulins-a-Vent (in French)	
Fanjeaux	Moulins de Fanjeaux	Moulin Tour		Two mills Moulins-a-Vent (in French)	
Ferrals-les-Corbières	Moulin de Ferrals les Corbières	Moulin Tour		Moulins-a-Vent (in French)	
Fontcouverte	Moulin de Fontcouverte	Moulin Tour		Moulins-a-Vent (in French)	
Fontjoncouse	Moulin de Fontjoncouse				
Gaja-la-Selve	Moulin de Gaja la Selve	Moulin Tour		Moulins-a-Vent (in French)	
Gasparets	Moulin a Gasparets	Moulin Tour		Moulins-a-Vent (in French)	
Gruissan	Moulins de Gruissan	Moulin Tour		Two mills, ruins Moulins-a-Vent (in French)	
Issel	Moulin d'Issel	Moulin Tour		Moulins-a-Vent (in French)	
Jonquières	Moulin de Jonquières	Moulin Tour		Moulins-a-Vent (in French)	
Lafage	Moulin de Lafage	Moulin Tour		Moulins-a-Vent (in French)	
Lagrasse	Moulins de Lagrasse	Moulin Tour		Two mills Moulins-a-Vent (in French)	
La Palme	Moulin de La Palme	Moulin Tour			
Lasbordes	Moulin a Lasbordes	Moulin Tour		Moulins-a-Vent (in French)	
Laurac-le-Grand	Moulin de Laurac le Grand	Moulin Tour		Moulins-a-Vent (in French)	
Laure-Minervois	Moulin de la Moulinasse	Moulin Tour		Moulins-a-Vent (in French)	
Laure-Minervois	Moulin de Laure-Minervois	Moulin Tour		Moulins-a-Vent (in French)	
Lavalette	Moulins a Lavalette	Moulin Tour		Two mills Moulins-a-Vent (in French)	
Les Cassés	Moulin de Caunes				
Lézignan-Corbières	Moulin de Lézignan-Corbières	Moulin Tour		Moulins-a-Vent (in French)	
Mailhac	Moulin de Mailhac	Moulin Tour	1821	Moulins-a-Vent (in French)	
Marseillette	Moulin de Lombard	Moulin Tour		Moulins-a-Vent (in French)	
Mas-Saintes-Puelles	Moulins de Laffon	Moulin Tour		Two mills, restored Moulins-a-Vent (in French)	
Mas-Saintes-Puelles	Moulin de Mas-Saintes-Puelles	Moulin Tour		Moulins-a-Vent (in French)	
Mézerville	Moulin d'Estévenou	Moulin Tour		Moulins-a-Vent (in French)	
Mézerville	Moulin de Cantegril	Moulin Tour		Moulins-a-Vent (in French)	
Mireval-Lauragais	Moulin de St Jean	Moulin Tour		Moulins-a-Vent (in French)	
Montauriol	Moulin du clos de la Maït	Moulin Tour		Moulins-a-Vent (in French)	
Montbrun-des-Corbières		Moulin Tour			
Montferrand		Moulin Tour			
Montlaur	Moulins de la Couscouillette	Moulin Tour		Two mills Moulins-a-Vent (in French)	
Montréal	Moulin Calvet	Moulin Tour		Moulins-a-Vent (in French)	
Montréal	Moulin de Viguier	Moulin Tour		Moulins-a-Vent (in French)	
Montredon-des-Corbières	Moulin des Corbières				
Moussan	Moulin de Moussan	Moulin Tour		Moulins-a-Vent (in French)	
Narbonne-Bages	Moulin a Bages	Moulin Tour		Moulins-a-Vent (in French)	
Nébias	Moulin de Nébias				
Ornaisons	Moulins d'Ornaisons	Moulin Tour		Two mills Moulins-a-Vent (in French)	
Palaja	Moulin a Palaja	Moulin Tour		Moulins-a-Vent (in French)	
Paraza	Moulin de la Cantarane	Moulin Tour		Moulins-a-Vent (in French)	
Pauligne	Moulin a Pauligne	Moulin Tour		Moulins-a-Vent (in French)	
Payra-sur-l'Hers	Moulin de Payra sur l'Hers	Moulin Tour		Moulins-a-Vent (in French)	
Pexiora	Moulins de Pexiora	Moulin Tour		Two mills Moulins-a-Vent (in French)	
Peyriac-de-Mer	Moulins de Peyriac de Mer	Moulin Tour		Moulins-a-Vent (in French)	
Portel-des-Corbières	Moulin de Portel des Corbières	Moulin Tour		Moulins-a-Vent (in French)	
Pouzols	Moulin de Pouzols	Moulin Tour		Moulins-a-Vent (in French)	
Pradelles-en-Val	Moulin a Pradelles en Val	Moulin Tour		Moulins-a-Vent (in French)	
Raissac-sur-Lampy	Moulin a Raissac sur Lampy	Moulin Tour		Moulins-a-Vent (in French)	
Ribouisse	Moulin de Coustou	Moulin Tour		Moulins-a-Vent (in French)	
Roquefort-des-Corbières	Moulins de Rocquefort des Corbières	Moulin Tour		Three mills Moulins-a-Vent (in French)	
Roullens	Moulins a Roullens	Moulin Tour		Two mills Moulins-a-Vent (in French)	
Saint-Amans	Moulin de la Bourdasse				
Saint-Hilaire	Moulin a Saint Hilaire	Moulin Tour		Moulins-a-Vent (in French)	
Saint-Laurent-de-la-Cabrerisse	Moulin a Saint Laurent de la Cabrerisse	Moulin Tour		Moulins-a-Vent (in French)	
Saint-Martin-de-Villereglan	Moulin a Saint Martin de Villereglan No. 1	Moulin Tour		Moulins-a-Vent (in French)	
Saint-Martin-Lalande	Moulin a Saint Martin Lalande	Moulin Tour		Moulins-a-Vent (in French)	
Saint-Papoul	Moulin de la Boudette	Moulin Tour		Moulins-a-Vent (in French)	
Saint-Paulet		Moulin Tour			
Saint-Sernin	Moulin de Rouzines	Moulin Tour		Moulins-a-Vent (in French)	
Sainte-Eulalie	Moulin a Sainte Eulalie	Moulin Tour		Moulins-a-Vent (in French)	
Sigean	Moulins de Sigean	Moulin Tour		Two mills Moulins-a-Vent (in French)	
Talairan	Moulins de Talairan	Moulin Tour		Moulins-a-Vent (in French)	
Trausse-Minervois	Moulin a Trausse Minervois	Moulin Tour		Moulins-a-Vent (in French)	
Ventenac-Cabardès	Moulin a Ventenac Cabardès	Moulin Tour		Moulins-a-Vent (in French)	
Villalier	Moulin des Combettes	Moulin Tour		Moulins-a-Vent (in French)	
Villar-Saint-Anselme	Moulin a Villar Saint Anselme	Moulin Tour		Moulins-a-Vent (in French)	
Villasavary	Moulin de la Glacière; Moulin Rocques	Moulin Tour	18th century	Moulins-a-Vent (in French)	
Villasavary	Moulin de l'Engabelle	Moulin Tour		Moulins-a-Vent (in French)	
Villegly	Moulin Sainte Anne	Moulin Tour		Moulins-a-Vent (in French)	
Villegly	Moulin a Villegly	Moulin Tour		Moulins-a-Vent (in French)	
Villemoustaussou	Moulin de Trapel	Moulin Tour		Moulins-a-Vent (in French)	
Villemoustaussou	Moulin a Villemoustaussou	Moulin Tour		Moulins-a-Vent (in French)	
Villeneuve-la-Comptal	Moulin de Villeneuve la Comptal	Moulin Tour		Moulins-a-Vent (in French)	
Villeneuve-Minervois	Moulin à Pech Rouzaud	Moulin Tour		Moulins-a-Vent (in French)	
Villepinte	Moulin a Villepinte	Moulin Tour		Moulins-a-Vent (in French)	
Villesiscle	Moulin de Lamothe	Moulin Tour		Moulins-a-Vent (in French)	
Villesplas-Villespy	Moulin de Villesplas No. 1	Moulin Tour		Moulins-a-Vent (in French)	
