= Henri Boudet =

French Catholic priest

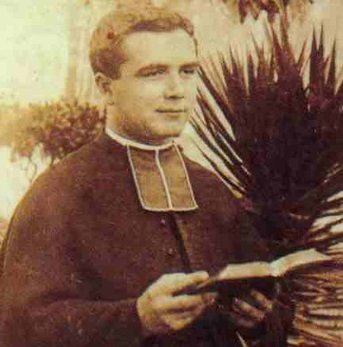
- Disputed photograph of Henri Boudet (Note: Disputed photograph used on the front cover of Jean-Luc Chaumeil and Jacques Rivière's book, L'Alphabet Solaire (Éditions du Borrego, 1985). It has been pointed out that photographs did not look like this when Boudet was in his youth. Ms Barthes, Mgr Boyer's niece, who lived in Rennes-les-Bains and who kept the key to the church and whose parents had known Boudet, stated in 1985 that this photograph was not of Abbé Boudet. Claude Boumendil and Gilbert Tappa, in their review of L'Alphabet Solaire referred to the doubtful photograph of Henri Boudet in, Les Cahiers de Rennes-le-Château, tome IV, page 44 (Éditions Belisane, 1985).)
- Born: 16 November 1837; Quillan, France
- Died: 30 March 1915 (aged 77); Axat, France
- Education: Roman Catholic seminary of Carcassonne
- Occupations: Priest, amateur archeologist, philologist, writer
- Writing career
- Language: French
- Subjects: linguistics, esoteric teachings
- Notable work: La Vraie langue celtique et le cromleck de Rennes-les-Bains

Abbé Jean-Jacques-Henri Boudet (16 November 1837 — 30 March 1915), is best known for being the French Catholic parish priest of Rennes-les-Bains between 1872 and 1914 and for being the author of the book La Vraie langue celtique et le cromleck de Rennes-les-Bains, first published in 1886 (since 1967, when he became associated with the alleged mystery of Rennes-le-Château).

== Biography ==
Boudet was born on 16 November 1837 in the house (Note: Boudet's siblings, Jeanne and Armand were also born in the same house.) of Mrs Zoé (Angélique-Zoé-Caroline née Saurel) Pinet-Laval (Boudet's neighbour), a widow in Quillan in the department of Aude and died on 30 March 1915 in Axat. He was the third of four children, the second of three sons, of Pierre-Auguste Boudet (died on 10 February 1841 and Jeanne-Adélaide-Elizabeth Huillet. Boudet's father was the manager (Note: Boudet's occupation is also described as proxy (fondé de pouvoir) for Monsieur le Baron de La Rochefoucauld or business agent (agent d'affaires).) of the forges of Quillan (Note: Most of the land and forests of Axat and Quillan were owned by the De la Rochefoucauld family since time immemorial) who had been authorized (1837) by François-Denis-Henry-Albert (Note: At her death in 1814, the Marchioness of Poulpry (1729–1814) left to De la Rochefoucauld's father, Jean-Baptiste (1757–1834) large areas of forest within the canton of Axat making him the largest proprietor besides the French state. The Marchioness of Poulpry also held the titles of Baroness of Arques and Couiza (amongst other titles).), Count de La Rochefoucauld-Bayers (1799–1854), a member of a prominent French aristocratic family, the De la Rochefoucault to act as his sole representative to constitute a joint venture, la societé des forges et fonderies d'Axat, a Forge and casting plant, the partnership was also composed of controlling shareholder, Ange-Jean-Michel-Bonaventure (1767–1847), 4th Marquess of Dax d'Axat, once Mayor of Montpellier and his son Barthélémy-Léon-François-Xavîer de Dax. Nothing is known about Boudet's early years following his father death and how his family managed to survive financially is not documented either; Gérard de Sède claimed – without citing any evidence – that Boudet entered holy orders through the patronage of Abbé Emile-Francois-Henri Géraud de Cayron (1807–1897). After completing his seminary studies in Carcassonne, where he also earned his degree in English language and literature, Boudet was ordained to the priesthood on Christmas Day 1861, he spent the first year of his priesthood in Durban-Corbières until 16 June 1862 when he was assigned to Caunes-Minervois up to 30 October 1866. On 1 November 1866, Boudet was appointed parish priest of Festes-et-Saint-André, next to the town of Limoux. In 1872, Boudet was transferred to Rennes-les-Bains (succeeding L'abbé Jean Vié who had died a short time earlier) until 1914 when he was discharged from his duty by the Bishop of Carcassonne, Mgr Paul-Félix Beuvain de Beauséjour (1839–1930), due to serious illness. Boudet lived in Rennes-les-Bains with his mother and sister Jeanne, both died the same year in 1896.

Henri Boudet spent the rest of his days in Axat (Note: Living with Edmund's widow, Marguerite-Marie-Céleste née Labat (1850-1931). After Boudet's death, his possessions were passed on to his sister-in-law, Céleste and then to her sister, Victorine Saurel.), where his younger brother Edmond (Jean-Baptiste-Edmond), who died on 5 May 1907 (Note: Boudet was buried two days later, on 7 May. Saunière was informed of his death 6 days later, on 13 May. The true nature of Boudet and Saunière's correspondence seems to have been no more than exchanges of civility between colleagues.), once worked as a notary (Note: Successor of Jean-Chrysostome Casteilla. Boudet retired in 1899.).

The two Boudet brothers are buried in the same grave. It features two epitaph inscriptions, engraved horizontally and on the lower part of the gravestone, a small rectangular shaped figure on its surface, engraved vertically with the following inscription ΙΧΟΥΣ which stand for Jesus Christ, Son of God, Saviour.

The name of Henri Boudet's successor was published in the regional Catholic periodical Semaine Religieuse de Carcassonne of 2 May 1914. Abbé Joseph Rescanières died suddenly at the age of 37 on 1 February 1915 from a suspected heart attack.

A final tribute to Boudet's character was published in the same periodical mentioned above on 10 April 1915.

=== Boudet's interests and La Vraie langue celtique ===
Beside his priestly responsibilities, Boudet's interests extended to the fields of local history, archaeology, toponymy, linguistics and photography. He was made a member of the following learned societies, the Société des Arts et des Sciences de Carcassonne (1888) and of the Société de Linguistique de Paris (1897 (Note: On 4 December 1897, Boudet was co-opted as one of the members of the Société de Linguistique de Paris on the recommendation of A. Imbert (1851-1916) and Louis Duvau (1864-1903). On the session of 5 février 1898, Duvau made a short presentation of Boudet's works on the Languedocien dialect to the Société de Linguistique de Paris followed by remarks by some of the attending members. Duvau was the copy editor of the Revue Celtique from 1897 to 1901 and a former student of Henri Gaidoz.)).

In the preface to his 1886 book, La Vraie langue celtique et le cromleck de Rennes-les-Bains, Boudet stated that his "cromleck" was "intimately linked to the resurrection" (trouve intimement lié à la résurrection) and in turn cognate to the revival of the Celtic language (ou, si l'on veut, au réveil inattendu de la langue celtique) and therefore to his etymological arguments. The first five of the eight chapters in Boudet's 1886 book consist of an argument that ancient languages such as Basque, Celtic, Punic and Hebrew are derived from a more ancient mother language that was identical to Modern English. For example, when Boudet referred to the location known as The Realsès (today called "la Realsesse") he claimed it was derived from two English words: real (i.e., effective), and cess (tax), when commenting how "The Realsès runs in a valley whose fertile earth enables the inhabitants to pay their taxes and where the Celts till their ground for easy produce". The search for a mother language from which all other languages were derived was nothing new and Henri Boudet was not the first author to make such a proposition.

Philippe Schrauben, in his introduction to the 1984 re-published edition of Boudet's book, commented: "...we notice that La Vraie langue celtique... is a huge mosaic of extracts of 19th-century works carefully chosen to make them more or less coherent. There are not only detailed quotations but whole pages transcribed word for word and put end to end." Schrauben considered that to understand Boudet's book one would have to research his sources and read them in the context of their time.

Boudet also made historical claims, like for example that the Tectosages (mainly known about from Strabo, that he called "Volkes Tectosages"), were early inhabitants of the Aude and the ancestors of the Saxons and the Franks, therefore of the English and the French.

Chapters six to eight of Boudet's book consisted of an analysis and mapping of the geological structures surrounding Rennes-les-Bains, whereby he confused isolated large stone blocks, put in place by nature (some marked with naturally-formed Greek crosses, caused by water erosion, as testified by Gibert and Rancoule in 1969 and by others), with menhirs and listed them as part of his vast cromlech (Boudet intended to call his tour of the mountain ridges in the area of Rennes-les-Bains with this word), with the inclusion of a secondary stone circle, that was ridiculed by scholars.

=== Boudet's 'cromleck': a tour ===
Boudet described his "cromleck" in chapter seven of his book, which in essence was a circular tour of the mountain ridges around Rennes-les-Bains: the area in question is illustrated by a map that was drawn by his brother, Edmond (who also did the drawings in the book). It was claimed that this tour, the cromleck, marked out a drunemeton, a central meeting point of the Tectosages. According to Boudet, the word dru-neme-ton was derived from the now obsolete English word trow (meaning to think or believe), and name. Boudet claimed this represented the place in society where ancient sages gathered together (that Boudet called the Neimheid) to think up names for the places they lived in, "to carry out their scientific functions and make up the particular or general nomenclature". Bill Putnam summarized Boudet's central argument: the drunemeton was a "special place where the tribal dignitaries came together to invent these incredible names based on words from a language that had not yet come into existence."

=== Reactions to La Vraie langue celtique ===
The book, written with Apologetics intention, didn't go unnoticed at the time of its first publication. An enthusiastic article on his book was published in the French regional Newspaper Le Courrier de l'Aude of 18 December 1866, praising his pioneer work, followed shortly afterwards by a severely negative review, given by lawyer and historian Gaston Jourdanne (1858–1905) (Note: Radical Mayor of Carcassonne from October 1887 to March 1888, Joudanne was also one of the founding members (1886) of the literary magazine, Revue de L'Aude and of the (Félibrige) Aude literary society l’Escolo audenco (1892) and a life member (majoral, 1894) of the literary association, Félibrige.), published in the French Newspaper Le Radical du Midi of 26 May 1887 that questioned the seriousness of Boudet's self-satisfied book.

The same year, Boudet's book was among the ten works selected for the prix Gobert, a prestigious prize (awarded to the most learning and detailed research concerning French history), distributed by the Académie des Inscriptions et Belles-Lettres but the prize was awarded to French historian and essayist Alphonse de Ruble (1834-1898) for his works entitled Le Mariage de Jeanne d'Albret and Antoine de Bourbon et Jeanne d'Albret. Boudet made an unsuccessful attempt to have his book honoured by the award of the médaille d'or, a prize (the awardee received a sum of money) distributed by the Académie des sciences, inscriptions et belles-lettres de Toulouse. M. Eugène Lapierre (1834-1923), speaking on behalf of the l'Académie des Sciences, commented about Boudet's book on 5 June 1887: "We cannot enter into a detailed criticism of this book in order to discuss all its whimsical assumptions and assertions, which are as gratuitous as they are audacious, and which seem to suggest that the author has a very fertile imagination. Adopting an exclusively religious viewpoint, the author has made unceasing use of authorities which have nothing to do with linguistics as it is nowadays constituted, such as the Bible, Latin authors, de Maistre, Chateaubriand, Figuier etc. We were not unsurprised to learn that the Punic language, which was spoken before Babel, was actually modern English, and was preserved by the Tectosages. This is what Monsieur Boudet has tried to prove to us by extraordinarily ingenious etymological feats. The Academy, while recognizing that an amount of work has gone into this volume which does deserve some respect, does not believe that it has a duty to set its seal of approval, by awarding a prize, on a system of historical reconstruction that is as bold as it is novel'."

A brief notice on Boudet's book, written by French prehistorian specialist Émile Cartailhac, a member of the Société d'Etudes Scientifiques de l'Aude and of the Société archéologique du Midi de la France (Note: President from 1914 to 1921. In 1879, Cartaillac was put in charge by the commission des monuments historiques to do an inventory of the megaliths of France.) was published in 1892 in the Revue des Pyrenées. Unsympathetic to Boudet's works, Cartailhac asked the local archeologists to be cautious about the claims of a gullible priest, author he said of the ridiculous book La Vrai langue celtique. In 1893, Cartailhac's notice was used by Gaston Jourdanne for his introduction of Boudet's book to the Société d'Etudes Scientifiques de l'Aude. Citing various renowned authorities, including a work by his friend, a well known Celtic expert, Marie Henri d'Arbois de Jubainville, Jourdanne demonstrated the errors of Boudet's researches and conclusions. Jourdanne's harsh criticism went so far as to say that Boudet's study was worthy at most of publication in the British satirical magazine Punch.

Jourdanne's criticism of Boudet's book represented only one out of many.

Boudet's Celtic theory was utilized on at least one occasion. One of his colleagues, Abbé Raymond Ancé of Greffeil, Aude, who was also interested in archaeology and who was unhappy with the etymology of "Greffeil" derived from the Latin word, Agrifolium (meaning Holly), asked Boudet for his personal view on the matter. Boudet claimed that the etymology of "Greffeil" was derived from Grev-fill, meaning Full (plenty) and Grev (grave) translated as a place full of graves. Abbé Ancé then conducted an excavation in a part of his town and discovered some ancient graves possibly dating back to Neolithic times, as well as some artifacts (that were donated to the Museum of Carcassonne). Ancé's archeological discoveries were published in the French newspaper, Le Courrier de l'Aude and drew the attention of none other than Charles Dat de St-Foulc, the Honorary President of the Société d'Études Scientifiques de l'Aude. St-Foulc with the archaeologist Germain Sicard went to Greffeil to see Ancé's discoveries for themselves. A report about Abbé Ancé's archaeological discoveries by Charles Dat de St-Foulc entitled Une excursion à Greffeil dans les Corbières was published in 1891 in the Bulletin de la Société d'Études Scientifiques de l'Aude. In 1875 one of Greffeil's inhabitants, Mr Barthe, unearthed an old tomb dating back to either Celtic Gaul or Roman Gaul periods; whether Boudet was aware of this discovery and used it to pen the etymology of "Greffeil" is open to debate.

Boudet autographed a copy of his book to the French doctor, author and politician Jacques-Auguste Bordes-Pagès (1815–1897). Bordes-Pagès made some additions of his own to Boudets's La Vraie langue celtique et le cromleck de Rennes-les-Bains.

Other recipients of Boudet's book included Queen Victoria and Pedro II of Brazil. The acknowledging letters, respectively dated March 20, 1889 and September 8, 1891 have survived. The first letter sent from Biarritz and written by Sir Henry Ponsonby reads as follows: "Sir Henry Ponsonby presents his compliments to Monsieur Cailhol and is commanded by The Queen Victoria to request him to thank the Reverend Pere Boudet for the interesting book on Languedoc and English which he has had the kindness to present to Her Majesty."

The second letter with similar sentiments was sent from Vichy and written by the Count of Aljezur, Chamberlain to the Emperor. It reads as follows: "His Majesty the Emperor Don Pedro d'Alcantara instructs me to thank you most cordially for the compliment and gift that you have kindly sent to His Majesty of your scientific work that He has just received along with your letter. My noble lord is very interested in linguistic and ethnographic studies and highly appreciates the information that you have sent him, and will be happy to know the outcome of your future researches and discoveries".

One of Boudet's copies of La Vraie langue celtique bears a signed dedication to the Bishop of Carcassonne, Mgr Paul-Félix Arsène Billard, that reads "A sa grandeur Monseigneur L'Évêque de Carcassonne. Hommage respectueux et filial de l'auteur. H. Boudet" (To his eminence, Monseigneur the Bishop of Carcassonne. Respectul and filial reverence from the author. H. Boudet).

Another of Boudet's copies of La Vraie langue celtique bears a signed dedication to the French esoterist Grasset d'Orcet, that reads "À G. d'Orcet, mon indéfectible amitié. H. Boudet" (To G. d'Orcet, my constant friend).

Abbé Joseph-Théodore Lasserre's historical study of the pilgrimage to the basilica church of Notre-Dame-Marceille, by Limoux (Histoire du pèlerinage de Notre-Dame de Marceille près de Limoux sur Aude) published in 1891, contains references to Boudet's book.

French officer Claude Dervieu, a member of the Académie des Arts, Sciences et Belles-lettres de Mâcon used Boudet's book as one of his sources when he compiled his study on Gallo-Celtic France (Les Origines gallo-celtiques de la Nation Française, 1907). In 1909, Dervieu's study was favourably reviewed by the committee of the Société historique et archéologique de Château-Thierry.

Boudet donated a copy of La vraie langue celtique to the Cambridge University Library, the book is still in the University of Cambridge's possession as late as 2015, in a letter written and signed by Boudet to the rector of the University of Cambridge, established the date of the donation on 11 December 1886. The manuscript of La vraie langue celtique was deposited in 1887 in the Manuscript Division of the Archives départementales, communales et hospitalières de l'Aude. Boudet donated another copy of his book to the Bibliothèque de la Société des Arts et des Sciences de Carcassonne in 1894. A Joseph Bonnafous was recorded to have done the same in 1907, this time to the Société d'Études Scientifiques de l'Aude which he was also a member and possibly the same Bonnafous who was printer in Carcassonne, rue de la Mairie and blood relative of Victor Bonnafous who printed Boudet's book. The Bibliothèque nationale de France once held an original copy of the La Vraie langue celtique et le cromleck de Rennes-les-Bains but it went missing at some unknown date, its disappearance was reported during an inventory. The Bibliothèque de Narbonne had also received a copy of Boudet's book in 1889.

In 1914, Boudet's La Vraie langue celtique et le cromleck de Rennes-les-Bains and Remarques sur la phonétique du Dialecte Languedocien were listed in the Literature (generalities) and in the Provençal dialect (Aude dialects) sections of the Aude bibliography edited by the Bulletin de la Commission archéologique de Narbonne.

=== Boudet's discoveries ===
Boudet was credited with the discovery of a water-container embossed with a Christian cross in around 1886 and of a statue of the goddess Venus in around 1900 in the maison Chaluleau in Rennes-les-Bains (the statue was sold in America).

=== Commemorative plaque ===
A commemorative plaque marking the centenary of Henri Boudet's death was placed in the church porch in Rennes-les-Bains on 6 June 2015. It was unveiled by the village mayor André Authier in the presence of the deputy mayor Marcelle Delmas.

== Association with Saunière and Rennes-le-Château ==
There are no first-hand (Note: Except second-hand accounts like the references in Saunière's private papers regarding occasional requests for Mass intentions send to Boudet, the acknowledgement of the not often exchange of letters including the receipt of Edmund Boudet's death announcement (13 May 1907), the next day, Saunière wrote a reply to Boudet offering his Condolences and a photograph (Henri Boudet's personal property) of Saunière at the Rocher tremblant (Pla de la Coste, Rennes-les-Bains), allegedly taken by Boudet, circa 1886.) accounts available of Boudet and Saunière being close acquaintances, nor did Boudet ever undertake any historical researches in the village of Rennes-le-Château. The only connection that is certain is that Boudet and Saunière were assigned to the same Diocese and their respective towns, which lie at a short distance from each other, shared the same name.

Some Rennes-le-Château researchers are inclined to identify the BS monogram inscribed on the statue of the Devil supporting the Holy Water Stoup, located at the entrance to the church of Rennes-le-Château, with the surname initials of Boudet and Saunière or the names of two local rivers, the Blanque and the Sals (as first envisaged by Gérard de Sède in 1967), but there is no concrete evidence as to what the inscription actually means and it remains undeciphered. Saunière referred to himself as B.S. in an early draft of his Will and testament written a short time after the death of his brother Alfred.

== Conspiracy theories ==
Because Henri Boudet was Abbé of Rennes-les-Bains at the same period of time that Bérenger Saunière was incumbent at Rennes-le-Château, also for being the author of La Vraie langue celtique, he has become a central character in modern conspiracy theories.

Gérard de Sède, in collaboration with Pierre Plantard, offered a romantic interpretation of La Vraie Langue Celtique et le cromleck de Rennes-les-Bains in his 1967 book L’Or de Rennes, claiming that Boudet wrote his book in a cryptic style that represented a code. De Sède interpreted the Church of Rennes-les-Bains and its churchyard also as part of a secret code, that led to and involved Rennes-le-Château.

As de Sède’s 1967 book became an immediate success, renewed interest increased in La Vraie Langue Celtique et le cromleck de Rennes-les-Bains, a book that only a few people had heard about previously.

Boudet’s book was re-edited in two different editions in 1978: a facsimile edition by Pierre Belfond, Paris, part of les classiques de l’occultisme, containing a foreword by Pierre Plantard and the second one, in a limited edition of 1,000 copies by La demeure Philosophale, Paris, with a foreword by Gérard de Sède (this edition did not respect the original pagination of Boudet's book).

Pierre Plantard, without providing any reliable sources in his 1978 foreword to Boudet's La Vraie langue celtique, claimed the book was published as a limited-edition of 500 copies that cost 5,382 francs: consisting of 98 copies sold in 28 years between 1886 and 1914; 100 free copies given to Public libraries, embassies and charities; 200 free copies available to visitors and patients who took the waters at the spa resort at Rennes-les-Bains interested in linguistics (or to any priests likely to be interested) – and the remaining 102 copies, according to Plantard, destroyed in 1914.

In fact, Boudet's book La Vraie Langue Celtique et le cromleck de Rennes-les-Bains was available directly from the printer, Victor Bonnafous in Carcassonne, at the retail price of 3,50 francs and by mail order at the price of 3,75 francs, or 3,90 francs, as advertised in Le Courrier de l'Aude of 27 January 1887 (page 3). If the 3,50 francs is applied to the 500 copies said to have been printed as Plantard claimed, this totalled 1,750 francs, well below the said sum of 5,382 francs the book is reputed to have cost.

In his preface, Plantard also claimed that "someone from Axat" found Boudet's account books on a rubbish tip and these revealed that between 1887 and 1891 Boudet gave 3,679,431 francs to Marie Denarnaud (Saunière's housekeeper); and that between 1894 and 1903 had given her 837,260 francs (in the same period, Boudet had given 7,665,250 francs to the Bishop of Carcassonne, Mgr Billard).

Plantard's claims attracted the following criticisms: There is no evidence that Boudet was wealthy enough to give donations involving tens of millions of francs; Boudet's account books have never been seen and Plantard did not disclose the name of the person who had found them; there is no evidence in Saunière's papers that Boudet was involved with the refurbishment of the church of Rennes-le-Château. But some of Saunière's account books are available, spanning from July, 1895 to November 1915 showing that Saunière received small amounts of money from Boudet on an irregular basis, dating from March 1896, March and October 1897, January and November 1898, March 1899 and March 1900, amounting to a grand total of 290 francs.

In his 1988 book entitled, Rennes-le-Château; Le dossier, les impostures, les phantasmes, les hypothèses, de Sède affirmed once again that Boudet wrote La Vraie langue celtique et le cromleck de Rennes-les-Bains in a cryptic fashion, adding to his 1967 analysis that Boudet used Jonathan Swift's A Discourse to Prove the Antiquity of the English Tongue, Showing from various instances, that Hebrew, Greek, and Latin were derived from the English (1712) and his Ars Punica, sive flos lingarum; The Art of Punning or the flower of languages in 79 rules (1719) as a method of encryption. De Sède also added that "la Vraie langue celtique" and its associated subject matter, "le cromlech de Rennes-les-Bains" are not the real theme of Boudet's book but in fact, a treatise on secret geography.

== Published works ==
- La Vraie langue celtique et le cromleck de Rennes-les-Bains (1886), imprimeur, Victor Bonnafous, successor of François Pomiès (Note: Imprimerie François Pomiès was purchased by one of its employees, Victor Bonnafous a short time before Boudet's book went into print, circa Autumn 1886. Bonnafous kept the François Pomiès name alive), Carcassonne, 310 pages with illustrated map and drawings ex-librīs, printed In-duodecimo format.
- Remarques sur la phonétique du Dialecte Languedocien (Mémoires de la Société des Arts et Sciences de Carcassonne, tome VII, pages 42–65, 1894; original manuscript lodged in Archives Départementales de l'Aude, cote 16PER7). Reprinted in Les Cahiers de Rennes-le-Château, tome IV, 1985.
- Le livre d'Axat, a follow-up to Remarques sur la phonétique du Dialecte Languedocien (Reviewed by Louis Fédié, Mémoires de la Société des Arts et Sciences de Carcassonne, tome VIII, pages 74–78, 1896), manuscript and transcript published in Chaumeil and Rivière's L'Alphabet Solaire, Éditions du Borrego, pages 111-233.
- Du Nom de Narbonne et exemples d'interpretation des mots gaulois par les racinnes saxonnes et l'anglais (1880), manuscript of 19 pages, facsimile published in the appendix of Urbain de Larouanne's La voie de Dieu et le cromleck de Rennes-les-Bains, Éditions Bélisane, (1987).

== Spurious writings attributed to Boudet ==
- Lazare Véni Foras! (1891 and 1914 editions). This imaginary book was first mentioned in the spurious document attributed to Madeleine Blancasall, Les Descendants mérovingiens ou l'Énigme du Razès wisigoth that was deposited in the Bibliothèque nationale in 1965 (claiming as its source, Genève: Alpina).

== Bibliography ==
- Joseph Ageorges, Une famille française au XIXe siècle (les Pagès et les Bordes-Pagès): contribution à l'étude des moeurs bourgeoises (Tourcoing: J. Duvivier, 1920)
- Patrick Berlier, Daniel Dugès, Christian Doumergue, etc. (editors), L'ABC de RLC: l'Encyclopédie de Rennes-le-Château (Arqa éditions, 2009. ISBN 2-7551-0031-1).
- Claude Boumendil, Gilbert Tappa, Les Livres: L'Alphabet Solaire (Les Cahiers de Rennes-le-Château, tome IV, pages 43–47, Éditions Belisane, 1985).
- Émile Cartailhac, Bibliographie Pyrénéenne et Méridionale: Bulletin de la commission archéologique et littéraire de l'arrondissement de Narbonne (Revue des Pyrenées et de la France méridionale, Tome IV, premier fascicule, Toulouse, 1892).
- Rémy Cazals, Daniel Fabre, Dominique Blanc, Les Audois Dictionnaire biographique (Association des Amis des Archives de l'Aude, Fédération Audoise des Oeuvres Laïques, Société d'études scientifiques de l'Aude, Carcassonne, 1990. ISBN 978-2906442078).
- Jean-Luc Chaumeil, Jacques Rivière, L'Alphabet Solaire: introduction à la langue universelle avec des textes inédits de l'abbé Boudet (Éditions du Borrego, 1985. ISBN 2-904724-03-6).
- Paul Courrent, Notice Historique sur les Bains de Rennes connus anciennement sous le nom de Bains de Montferrand (Bulletin de la Société d'études scientifiques de l'Aude, Tome XXXVIII, 1934).
- Ct Dervieu, Les Origines Gallo-Celtiques de la Nation Française – Extrait des Annales de l'Académie de Macon (3e série-Tome XII) (Macon, Protat frères, Imprimeurs 1907).
- Urbain Gibert, Notes Historiques sur les Bains de Montferrand devenues les Bains de Rennes, Actuellement Rennes-les-Bains (Bulletin de la Société d’Ètudes Scientifiques de l’Aude, Tome LXXIII, 1973).
- Urbain Gibert, Guy Rancoule, Rennes-les-Bains: note sur un tête sculptée (Bulletin de la Société Scientifiques de l’Aude, Tome LXIX, 1969).
- André Goudonnet, Henri Boudet, abbé de Rennes-les-Bains: 100e anniversaire (Arqa éditions, 2015. ISBN 275510081-8)
- Pierre Jarnac, Histoire du Trésor de Rennes-le-Château (L’Association pour le développement de la lecture, 1985; republished by Éditions Belisane, Cazilhac, 1998. ISBN 2-910730-19-0).
- Pierre Jarnac, Les Archives de Rennes-le-Château, tome 1 (Éditions Belisane, 1987. ISBN 2-902296-72-X)
- Gaston Jourdanne, Bibliographie: La vraie langue celtique par l'abbé BOUDET (Le Radical du Midi, 26 May 1887).
- Gaston Jourdanne, De quelques étymologies celtiques (Bulletin de la Société d'études scientifiques de l'Aude", quatriéme année, tome IV, 1893).
- J.-Th. Lasserre, Histoire du pèlerinage de Notre-Dame de Marceille près de Limoux sur Aude, Limoux, Talamas, (1891).
- Pierre Plantard, preface in Henri Boudet, La Vraie langue celtique et le cromleck de Rennes-les-Bains (introduction by Jean-Pierre Deloux, Paris: Éditions Pierre Belfond, 1978. ISBN 2-7144-1186-X).
- Bill Putnam, John Edwin Wood, The Treasure of Rennes-le-Château, a Mystery Solved (Stroud: Sutton Publishing, 2003, ISBN 0-7509-3081-0; Revised Paperback Edition, Stroud: Sutton Publishing, 2005. ISBN 978-0750942164).
- Philippe Schrauben, introduction in Henri Boudet, La Vraie langue celtique et le cromleck de Rennes-les-Bains (Éditions Belisane, Cazilhac, 1984; facsimile edition with colorized map. ISBN 2-902296-48-7). Philippe Schrauben previously self-published Boudet's book in 1976, that did not respect the original pagination.
- Gérard de Sède, L'Or de Rennes ou la Vie insolite de Bérenger Saunière, curé de Rennes-le-Château (Paris: René Julliard, 1967).
- Gérard de Sède, Rennes-le-Château: le dossier, les impostures, les phantasmes, les hypothèses (Paris: Robert Laffont, "Les Énigmes de l'univers", 1988. ISBN 2-221-05522-5).
- M. Charles Dat de St-Foulc, Une Excursion A Greffeil Dans les Corbières (Bulletin de la Société d'Études Scientifiques de l'Aude, Tome II, 1891)
- Germain Sicard, Note sur les Croix Rupestres des Corbières (Bulletin de la Société Scientifiques de l’Aude, Tome XXXVII, 1928).
- Bulletin de la Commission archéologique de Narbonne, Tome XIII (1914).
- Mémoires de l'Académie des sciences, inscriptions et belles-lettres de Toulouse, Huitième série-Tome IX, Imprimerie Douloudure-Privat, Toulouse, 1887 (Eugène Lapierre, page 648).
- Le Courrier de l'Aude 18 decembre 1886 (33me Année, N° 3994).
- Le Courrier de l'Aude 27 janvier 1887 (33me Année, N° 4025).
- Le Courrier de l'Aude 13 avril 1915 (58me Année, N° 12479).
