= Digne (disambiguation) =

Digne may refer to:

- Digne-les-Bains, commune in the departement of Alpes-de-Haute-Provence, France
- La Digne-d'Amont, commune in the departement of Aude, France
- La Digne-d'Aval, commune in the departement of Aude, France
- Roman Catholic Diocese of Digne, Roman Catholic Diocese of Digne-les-Bains
- Lucas Digne, French football player
- 10088 Digne, asteroid

== See also ==
- Digne-les-Bains (disambiguation)
