= Arrondissement of Limoux =

Coordinates: 43°03′11″N 2°12′55″E

Limoux
- Arrondissement
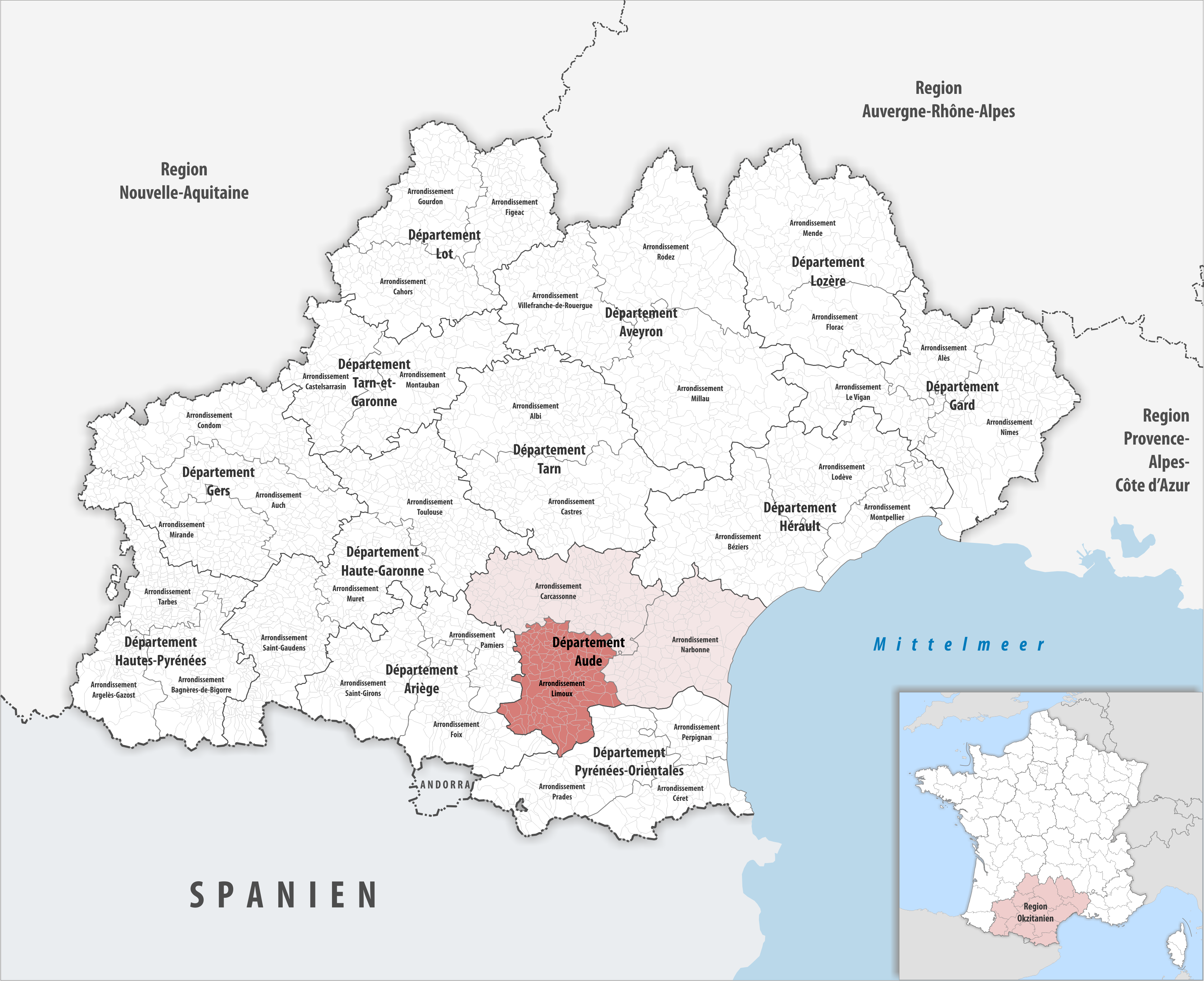
- Location within the region Occitanie
- Country: France
- Region: Occitania
- Department: Aude
- No. of communes: {{{nbcomm}}}
- Area: 1,727.3 km^{2} (666.9 sq mi)
- Population (2023): 42,820
  - Density: 24.79/km^{2} (64.21/sq mi)
- INSEE code: 112

The arrondissement of Limoux is an arrondissement of France in the Aude department in the Occitanie région. Its INSEE code is 112 and its capital city is Limoux. It has 138 communes. Its population is 42,296 (2021), and its area is 1,727.3 km^{2} (666.9 sq mi).

It is the southernmost of the arrondissements of the department. The only city in the arrondissement with a population of 10,000 or higher is the capital, Limoux, with 10,180 inhabitants (2012).

== Geography ==
The arrondissement of Limoux is bordered to the north by the arrondissement of Carcassonne, to the east by the arrondissement of Narbonne, to the south by the Pyrénées-Orientales department, and to the west by the Ariège department.

== Composition ==
The communes of the arrondissement of Limoux, and their INSEE codes, are:

1. Ajac (11003)
2. Alaigne (11004)
3. Alet-les-Bains (11008)
4. Antugnac (11010)
5. Arques (11015)
6. Artigues (11017)
7. Aunat (11019)
8. Axat (11021)
9. Belcaire (11028)
10. Belcastel-et-Buc (11029)
11. Belfort-sur-Rebenty (11031)
12. Bellegarde-du-Razès (11032)
13. Belvèze-du-Razès (11034)
14. Belvianes-et-Cavirac (11035)
15. Belvis (11036)
16. Bessède-de-Sault (11038)
17. La Bezole (11039)
18. Bouriège (11045)
19. Bourigeole (11046)
20. Le Bousquet (11047)
21. Brugairolles (11053)
22. Bugarach (11055)
23. Cailhau (11058)
24. Cailhavel (11059)
25. Cailla (11060)
26. Cambieure (11061)
27. Campagna-de-Sault (11062)
28. Campagne-sur-Aude (11063)
29. Camps-sur-l'Agly (11065)
30. Camurac (11066)
31. Cassaignes (11073)
32. Castelreng (11078)
33. Caunette-sur-Lauquet (11082)
34. Cépie (11090)
35. Chalabre (11091)
36. Le Clat (11093)
37. Clermont-sur-Lauquet (11094)
38. Comus (11096)
39. Corbières (11100)
40. Coudons (11101)
41. Couiza (11103)
42. Counozouls (11104)
43. Cournanel (11105)
44. Courtauly (11107)
45. La Courtète (11108)
46. Coustaussa (11109)
47. Cubières-sur-Cinoble (11112)
48. La Digne-d'Amont (11119)
49. La Digne-d'Aval (11120)
50. Donazac (11121)
51. Escouloubre (11127)
52. Escueillens-et-Saint-Just-de-Bélengard (11128)
53. Espéraza (11129)
54. Espezel (11130)
55. La Fajolle (11135)
56. Festes-et-Saint-André (11142)
57. Fontanès-de-Sault (11147)
58. Fourtou (11155)
59. Gaja-et-Villedieu (11158)
60. Galinagues (11160)
61. Gardie (11161)
62. Gincla (11163)
63. Ginoles (11165)
64. Gramazie (11167)
65. Granès (11168)
66. Greffeil (11169)
67. Joucou (11177)
68. Ladern-sur-Lauquet (11183)
69. Lauraguel (11197)
70. Lignairolles (11204)
71. Limoux (11206)
72. Loupia (11207)
73. Luc-sur-Aude (11209)
74. Magrie (11211)
75. Malras (11214)
76. Malviès (11216)
77. Marsa (11219)
78. Mazerolles-du-Razès (11228)
79. Mazuby (11229)
80. Mérial (11230)
81. Missègre (11235)
82. Montazels (11240)
83. Montfort-sur-Boulzane (11244)
84. Montgradail (11246)
85. Monthaut (11247)
86. Montjardin (11249)
87. Nébias (11263)
88. Niort-de-Sault (11265)
89. Pauligne (11274)
90. Peyrefitte-du-Razès (11282)
91. Peyrolles (11287)
92. Pieusse (11289)
93. Pomas (11293)
94. Pomy (11294)
95. Puilaurens (11302)
96. Puivert (11303)
97. Quillan (11304)
98. Quirbajou (11306)
99. Rennes-le-Château (11309)
100. Rennes-les-Bains (11310)
101. Rivel (11316)
102. Rodome (11317)
103. Roquefeuil (11320)
104. Roquefort-de-Sault (11321)
105. Roquetaillade-et-Conilhac (11323)
106. Routier (11328)
107. Saint-Benoît (11333)
108. Saint-Couat-du-Razès (11338)
109. Sainte-Colombe-sur-Guette (11335)
110. Sainte-Colombe-sur-l'Hers (11336)
111. Saint-Ferriol (11341)
112. Saint-Hilaire (11344)
113. Saint-Jean-de-Paracol (11346)
114. Saint-Julia-de-Bec (11347)
115. Saint-Just-et-le-Bézu (11350)
116. Saint-Louis-et-Parahou (11352)
117. Saint-Martin-Lys (11358)
118. Saint-Martin-de-Villereglan (11355)
119. Saint-Polycarpe (11364)
120. Salvezines (11373)
121. Seignalens (11375)
122. La Serpent (11376)
123. Serres (11377)
124. Sonnac-sur-l'Hers (11380)
125. Sougraigne (11381)
126. Terroles (11389)
127. Tourreilles (11394)
128. Tréziers (11400)
129. Val-de-Lambronne (11080)
130. Val-du-Faby (11131)
131. Valmigère (11402)
132. Véraza (11406)
133. Villardebelle (11412)
134. Villar-Saint-Anselme (11415)
135. Villarzel-du-Razès (11417)
136. Villebazy (11420)
137. Villefort (11424)
138. Villelongue-d'Aude (11427)

== History ==
The arrondissement of Limoux was created in 1800. At the January 2017 reorganization of the arrondissements of Aude, it lost seven communes to the arrondissement of Carcassonne.

As a result of the reorganisation of the cantons of France which came into effect in 2015, the borders of the cantons are no longer related to the borders of the arrondissements. The cantons of the arrondissement of Limoux were, as of January 2015:

1. Alaigne
2. Axat
3. Belcaire
4. Chalabre
5. Couiza
6. Limoux
7. Quillan
8. Saint-Hilaire
