= Ladern-sur-Lauquet =

Commune in Occitanie, France

- Commune
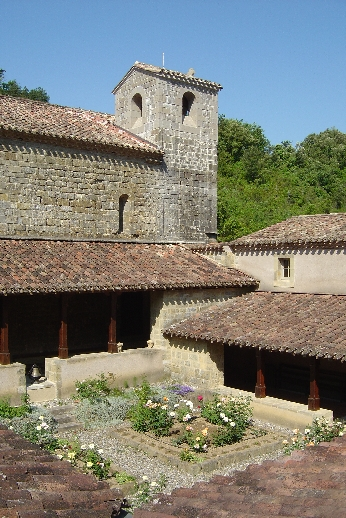
- Priory of Rieunette

- Coat of arms
- Location of Ladern-sur-Lauquet
- Location within France Location within Occitanie
- Coordinates: 43°06′21″N 2°21′09″E
- Country: France
- Region: Occitania
- Department: Aude
- Arrondissement: Limoux
- Canton: La Région Limouxine
- Intercommunality: Limouxin

Government
  - Mayor (2020–2026): Raymond Cabanne
- Area^{1}: 24.64 km^{2} (9.51 sq mi)
- Elevation: 130 m (430 ft)
- Highest elevation: 623 m (2,044 ft)
- Lowest elevation: 176 m (577 ft)
- Population (2023): 248
  - Density: 10.1/km^{2} (26.1/sq mi)
- Time zone: UTC+01:00 (CET)
  - Summer (DST): UTC+02:00 (CEST)
- INSEE/Postal code: 11183 /11250
- ^{1} French Land Register data, which excludes lakes, ponds, glaciers > 1 km^{2} (0.386 sq mi or 247 acres) and river estuaries.

Ladern-sur-Lauquet (French pronunciation: [ladɛʁn syʁ lokɛ]; Occitan: Ladèrn de Lauquet) is a commune in the Aude department in southern France.

== Population ==
Historical population
| Year | Pop. | ±% p.a. |
|---|---|---|
| 1968 | 201 | — |
| 1975 | 191 | −0.73% |
| 1982 | 184 | −0.53% |
| 1990 | 199 | +0.98% |
| 1999 | 228 | +1.52% |
| 2007 | 253 | +1.31% |
| 2012 | 255 | +0.16% |
| 2017 | 266 | +0.85% |
| 2023 | 248 | −1.16% |
Source: INSEE

== See also ==
- Communes of the Aude department
