= Cournanel =

Commune in Occitanie, France

- Commune
- Coat of arms
- Location of Cournanel
- Location within France Location within Occitanie
- Coordinates: 43°02′03″N 2°14′06″E
- Country: France
- Region: Occitania
- Department: Aude
- Arrondissement: Limoux
- Canton: La Région Limouxine
- Intercommunality: Limouxin

Government
  - Mayor (2020–2026): Alain Costes
- Area^{1}: 6.34 km^{2} (2.45 sq mi)
- Elevation: 260 m (850 ft)
- Highest elevation: 482 m (1,581 ft)
- Lowest elevation: 174 m (571 ft)
- Population (2023): 659
  - Density: 104/km^{2} (269/sq mi)
- Time zone: UTC+01:00 (CET)
  - Summer (DST): UTC+02:00 (CEST)
- INSEE/Postal code: 11105 /11300
- ^{1} French Land Register data, which excludes lakes, ponds, glaciers > 1 km^{2} (0.386 sq mi or 247 acres) and river estuaries.

Cournanel (French pronunciation: [kuʁnanɛl]; Occitan: Cornanèl) is a commune in the Aude department in southern France.

== Population ==
Historical population
Year	Pop.	±% p.a.
1968	246	—
1975	279	+1.81%
1982	344	+3.04%
1990	502	+4.84%
1999	524	+0.48%
2007	598	+1.66%
2012	665	+2.15%
2017	714	+1.43%
2023	659	−1.33%
Source: INSEE

== See also ==
- Communes of the Aude department
