= Belcastel-et-Buc =

Commune in Occitanie, France

- Commune
- Coat of arms
- Location of Belcastel-et-Buc
- Location within France Location within Occitanie
- Coordinates: 43°02′19″N 2°20′28″E
- Country: France
- Region: Occitania
- Department: Aude
- Arrondissement: Limoux
- Canton: La Région Limouxine
- Intercommunality: Limouxin

Government
  - Mayor (2020–2026): Anne-Marie Valmigere
- Area^{1}: 14.15 km^{2} (5.46 sq mi)
- Elevation: 490 m (1,610 ft)
- Highest elevation: 802 m (2,631 ft)
- Lowest elevation: 273 m (896 ft)
- Population (2023): 60
  - Density: 4.2/km^{2} (11/sq mi)
- Time zone: UTC+01:00 (CET)
  - Summer (DST): UTC+02:00 (CEST)
- INSEE/Postal code: 11029 /11580
- ^{1} French Land Register data, which excludes lakes, ponds, glaciers > 1 km^{2} (0.386 sq mi or 247 acres) and river estuaries.

Belcastel-et-Buc (French pronunciation: [bɛlkastɛl e byk]; Occitan: Bèlcastèl e Buc) is a commune in the Aude department in southern France.

== Population ==
Historical population
| Year | Pop. | ±% p.a. |
|---|---|---|
| 1968 | 55 | — |
| 1975 | 61 | +1.49% |
| 1982 | 63 | +0.46% |
| 1990 | 62 | −0.20% |
| 1999 | 58 | −0.74% |
| 2007 | 67 | +1.82% |
| 2012 | 73 | +1.73% |
| 2017 | 58 | −4.50% |
| 2023 | 60 | +0.57% |
Source: INSEE

== See also ==
- Communes of the Aude department
