= Digne-les-Bains (disambiguation) =

Digne-les-Bains is a commune in the department of Alpes-de-Haute-Provence in France.

Digne-les-Bains may also refer to:

- Arrondissement of Digne-les-Bains, an arrondissement in the department of Alpes-de-Haute-Provence, France
- Canton of Digne-les-Bains-1, a canton in the department of Alpes-de-Haute-Provence, France
- Canton of Digne-les-Bains-2, a canton in the department of Alpes-de-Haute-Provence, France

== See also ==
- Digne (disambiguation)
