= La Bezole =

Commune in Occitanie, France

- Commune
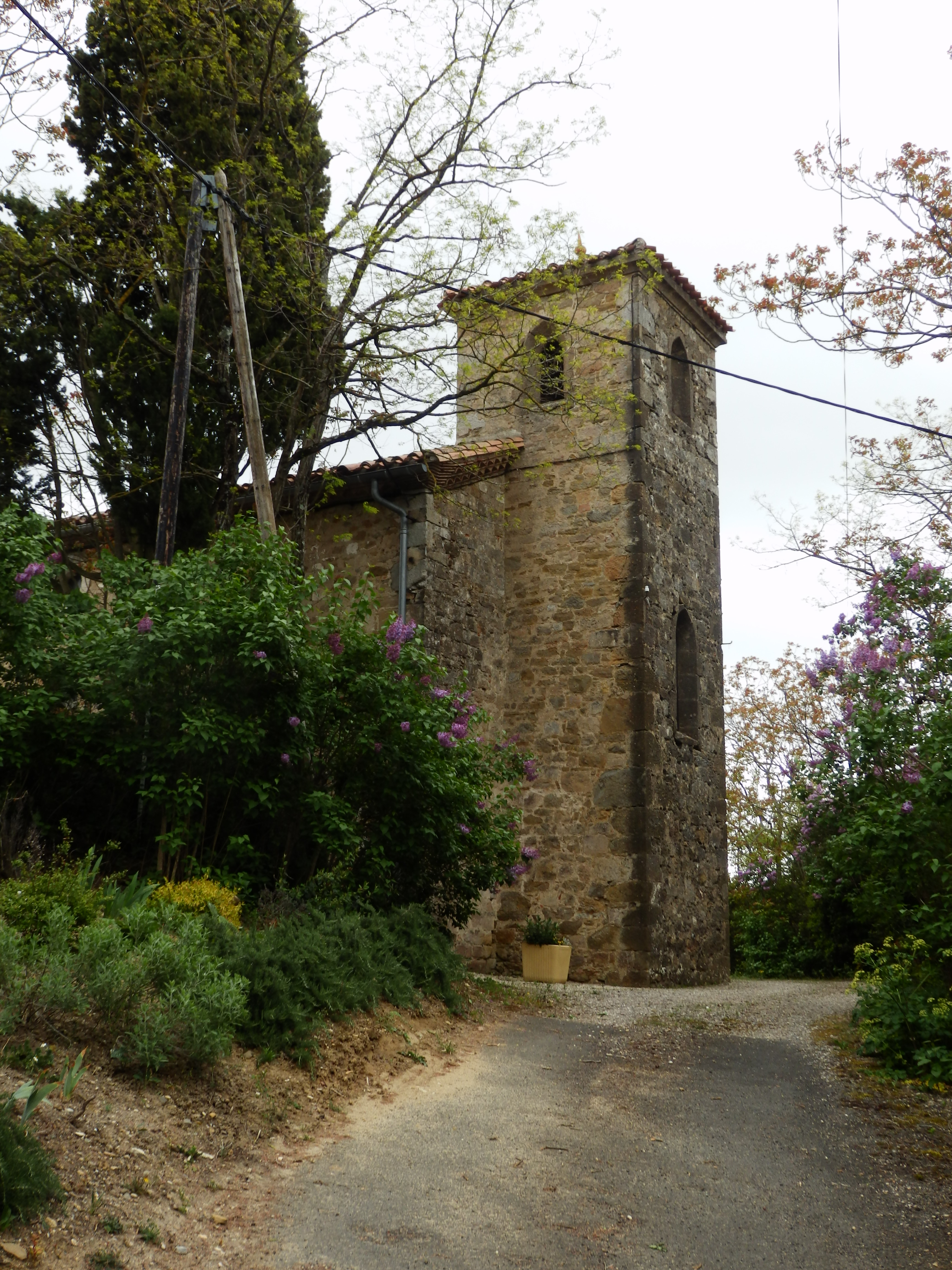
- The church in La Bezole
- Location of La Bezole
- Location within France Location within Occitanie
- Coordinates: 43°02′05″N 2°06′31″E
- Country: France
- Region: Occitania
- Department: Aude
- Arrondissement: Limoux
- Canton: La Région Limouxine

Government
  - Mayor (2020–2026): Lionel Mirabet
- Area^{1}: 6.51 km^{2} (2.51 sq mi)
- Elevation: 500 m (1,600 ft)
- Highest elevation: 601 m (1,972 ft)
- Lowest elevation: 300 m (980 ft)
- Population (2023): 44
  - Density: 6.8/km^{2} (18/sq mi)
- Time zone: UTC+01:00 (CET)
  - Summer (DST): UTC+02:00 (CEST)
- INSEE/Postal code: 11039 /11300
- ^{1} French Land Register data, which excludes lakes, ponds, glaciers > 1 km^{2} (0.386 sq mi or 247 acres) and river estuaries.

La Bezole (French pronunciation: [la bəzɔl]; Occitan: La Vesòla) is a commune in the Aude department in southern France.

== Population ==
Historical population
| Year | Pop. | ±% p.a. |
|---|---|---|
| 1968 | 32 | — |
| 1975 | 35 | +1.29% |
| 1982 | 27 | −3.64% |
| 1990 | 38 | +4.36% |
| 1999 | 42 | +1.12% |
| 2007 | 46 | +1.14% |
| 2012 | 42 | −1.80% |
| 2017 | 44 | +0.93% |
| 2023 | 44 | +0.00% |
Source: INSEE

== See also ==
- Communes of the Aude department
