= Gardie, Aude =

Commune in Occitanie, France

Gardie
- Commune
- Coat of arms
- Location of Gardie
- Location within France Location within Occitanie
- Coordinates: 43°04′32″N 2°18′00″E
- Country: France
- Region: Occitania
- Department: Aude
- Arrondissement: Limoux
- Canton: La Région Limouxine
- Intercommunality: Limouxin

Government
  - Mayor (2020–2026): Jean Roger
- Area^{1}: 4.65 km^{2} (1.80 sq mi)
- Elevation: 230 m (750 ft)
- Highest elevation: 345 m (1,132 ft)
- Lowest elevation: 174 m (571 ft)
- Population (2023): 128
  - Density: 27.5/km^{2} (71.3/sq mi)
- Time zone: UTC+01:00 (CET)
  - Summer (DST): UTC+02:00 (CEST)
- INSEE/Postal code: 11161 /11250
- ^{1} French Land Register data, which excludes lakes, ponds, glaciers > 1 km^{2} (0.386 sq mi or 247 acres) and river estuaries.

Gardie (French pronunciation: [ɡaʁdi]; Occitan: Gàrdia) is a commune in the Aude department in southern France.

== Geography ==
It is a small hilltop village on the edge of the Barris stream valley. It is in the Canton of St Hilaire, 4 km away.

== History ==
The village has Roman origins and was named Gardiaco. It was probably built as a guardpost for the nearby St Hilaire Abbey.

The centre of the village has a Circulade, a circle of old houses that would have originally been built around the perimeter of the now missing chateau as a defensive feature. It was possible to circumvent the village through the attics of these houses. The church has a small tower topped by a cast iron frame cap and bells.

== Population ==
Historical population
Year	Pop.	±% p.a.
1968	160	—
1975	132	−2.71%
1982	112	−2.32%
1990	95	−2.04%
1999	101	+0.68%
2007	104	+0.37%
2012	112	+1.49%
2017	121	+1.56%
2023	128	+0.94%
Source: INSEE

== Economy ==
Gardie is a farming village with the main crop being grapes. Most of the grapes go to produce the famous Blanquette de Limoux or Limoux A.O.C. red wine.

== See also ==
- Communes of the Aude department
