= Véraza =

Commune in Occitanie, France

- Commune
- Location of Véraza
- Location within France Location within Occitanie
- Coordinates: 42°59′11″N 2°18′24″E
- Country: France
- Region: Occitania
- Department: Aude
- Arrondissement: Limoux
- Canton: La Région Limouxine
- Intercommunality: Limouxin

Government
  - Mayor (2020–2026): Daniel Palop
- Area^{1}: 14.66 km^{2} (5.66 sq mi)
- Elevation: 400 m (1,300 ft)
- Highest elevation: 781 m (2,562 ft)
- Lowest elevation: 308 m (1,010 ft)
- Population (2023): 35
  - Density: 2.4/km^{2} (6.2/sq mi)
- Time zone: UTC+01:00 (CET)
  - Summer (DST): UTC+02:00 (CEST)
- INSEE/Postal code: 11406 /11580
- ^{1} French Land Register data, which excludes lakes, ponds, glaciers > 1 km^{2} (0.386 sq mi or 247 acres) and river estuaries.

Véraza (French pronunciation: [veʁaza]; Occitan: Verasan) is a commune in the Aude department in southern France.

== Population ==
Historical population
Year	Pop.	±% p.a.
1968	42	—
1975	29	−5.15%
1982	41	+5.07%
1990	48	+1.99%
1999	45	−0.71%
2007	38	−2.09%
2012	37	−0.53%
2017	32	−2.86%
2023	35	+1.50%
Source: INSEE

== See also ==
- Communes of the Aude department
