= Clermont-sur-Lauquet =

Commune in Occitanie, France

- Commune
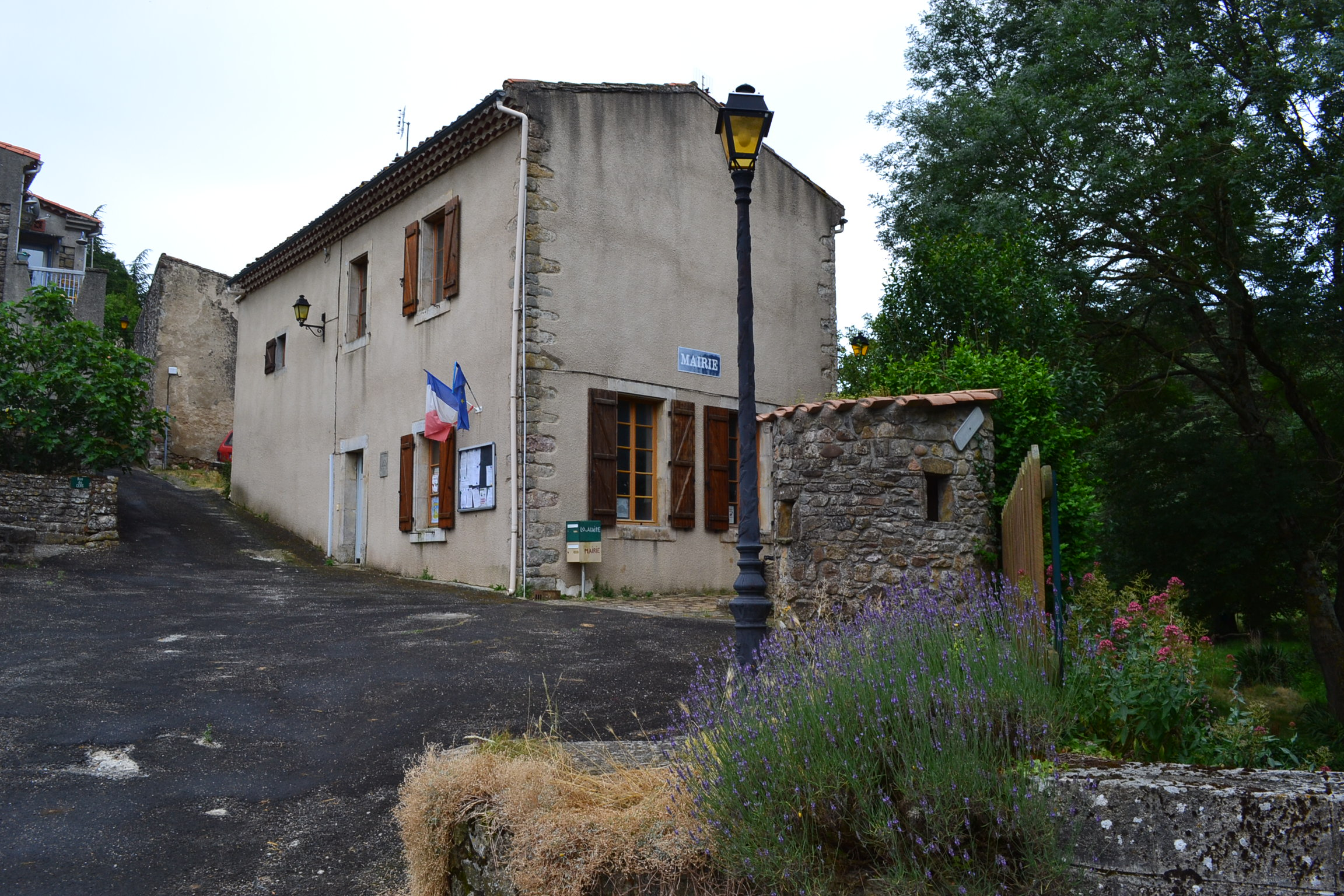
- The town hall in Clermont-sur-Lauquet

- Coat of arms
- Location of Clermont-sur-Lauquet
- Location within France Location within Occitanie
- Coordinates: 43°02′46″N 2°25′21″E
- Country: France
- Region: Occitania
- Department: Aude
- Arrondissement: Limoux
- Canton: La Région Limouxine
- Intercommunality: Limouxin

Government
  - Mayor (2020–2026): Miguel Garcia De La Torre
- Area^{1}: 18.29 km^{2} (7.06 sq mi)
- Elevation: 500 m (1,600 ft)
- Highest elevation: 705 m (2,313 ft)
- Lowest elevation: 338 m (1,109 ft)
- Population (2023): 29
  - Density: 1.6/km^{2} (4.1/sq mi)
- Time zone: UTC+01:00 (CET)
  - Summer (DST): UTC+02:00 (CEST)
- INSEE/Postal code: 11094 /11250
- ^{1} French Land Register data, which excludes lakes, ponds, glaciers > 1 km^{2} (0.386 sq mi or 247 acres) and river estuaries.

Clermont-sur-Lauquet (French pronunciation: [klɛʁmɔ̃ syʁ lokɛ]; Occitan: Clarmont) is a commune in the Aude department in southern France.

== Population ==
Historical population
Year	Pop.	±% p.a.
1968	26	—
1975	27	+0.54%
1982	29	+1.03%
1990	22	−3.39%
1999	26	+1.87%
2007	22	−2.07%
2012	27	+4.18%
2017	26	−0.75%
2023	29	+1.84%
Source: INSEE

== See also ==
- Communes of the Aude department
