= Cépie =

Commune in Occitanie, France

- Commune
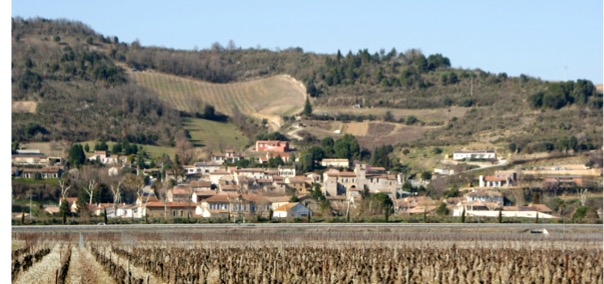
- A general view of Cépie

- Coat of arms
- Location of Cépie
- Location within France Location within Occitanie
- Coordinates: 43°06′20″N 2°14′43″E
- Country: France
- Region: Occitania
- Department: Aude
- Arrondissement: Limoux
- Canton: La Région Limouxine
- Intercommunality: Limouxin

Government
  - Mayor (2020–2026): Philippe Andrieu
- Area^{1}: 6.61 km^{2} (2.55 sq mi)
- Elevation: 154 m (505 ft)
- Highest elevation: 364 m (1,194 ft)
- Lowest elevation: 146 m (479 ft)
- Population (2023): 598
  - Density: 90.5/km^{2} (234/sq mi)
- Time zone: UTC+01:00 (CET)
  - Summer (DST): UTC+02:00 (CEST)
- INSEE/Postal code: 11090 /11300
- ^{1} French Land Register data, which excludes lakes, ponds, glaciers > 1 km^{2} (0.386 sq mi or 247 acres) and river estuaries.

Cépie (French pronunciation: [sepi]; Occitan: Cépia) is a commune in the Aude department in southern France.

== Population ==
Historical population
Year	Pop.	±% p.a.
1968	292	—
1975	308	+0.76%
1982	318	+0.46%
1990	413	+3.32%
1999	540	+3.02%
2007	634	+2.03%
2012	657	+0.72%
2017	646	−0.34%
2023	598	−1.28%
Source: INSEE

== See also ==
- Communes of the Aude department
