= Caunette-sur-Lauquet =

Commune in Occitanie, France

- Commune
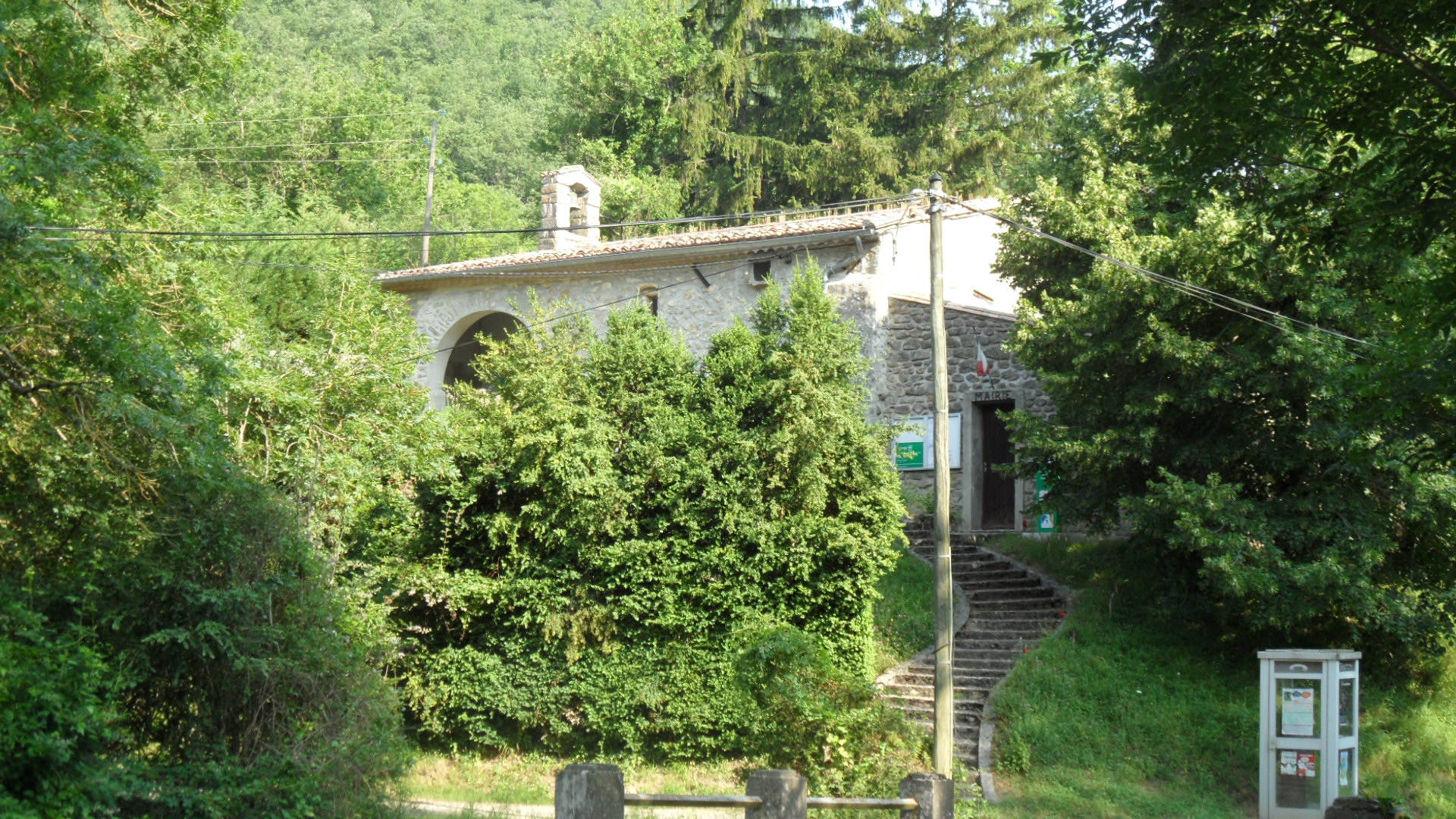
- The town hall in Caunette-sur-Lauquet

- Coat of arms
- Location of Caunette-sur-Lauquet
- Location within France Location within Occitanie
- Coordinates: 43°01′54″N 2°24′58″E
- Country: France
- Region: Occitania
- Department: Aude
- Arrondissement: Limoux
- Canton: La Région Limouxine
- Intercommunality: Limouxin

Government
  - Mayor (2020–2026): Marie-Pierre Gayda
- Area^{1}: 4.97 km^{2} (1.92 sq mi)
- Elevation: 500 m (1,600 ft)
- Highest elevation: 786 m (2,579 ft)
- Lowest elevation: 400 m (1,300 ft)
- Population (2023): 11
  - Density: 2.2/km^{2} (5.7/sq mi)
- Time zone: UTC+01:00 (CET)
  - Summer (DST): UTC+02:00 (CEST)
- INSEE/Postal code: 11082 /11250
- ^{1} French Land Register data, which excludes lakes, ponds, glaciers > 1 km^{2} (0.386 sq mi or 247 acres) and river estuaries.

Caunette-sur-Lauquet (French pronunciation: [konɛt syʁ lokɛ]; Occitan: Caunetas de Lauquet) is a commune in the Aude department in southern France.

== Population ==
Historical population
Year	Pop.	±% p.a.
1968	12	—
1975	12	+0.00%
1982	7	−7.41%
1990	0	−100.00%
1999	4	—
2007	5	+2.83%
2012	9	+12.47%
2017	4	−14.97%
2023	11	+18.36%
Source: INSEE

== See also ==
- Communes of the Aude department
