= Bouriège =

Commune in Occitanie, France

- Commune
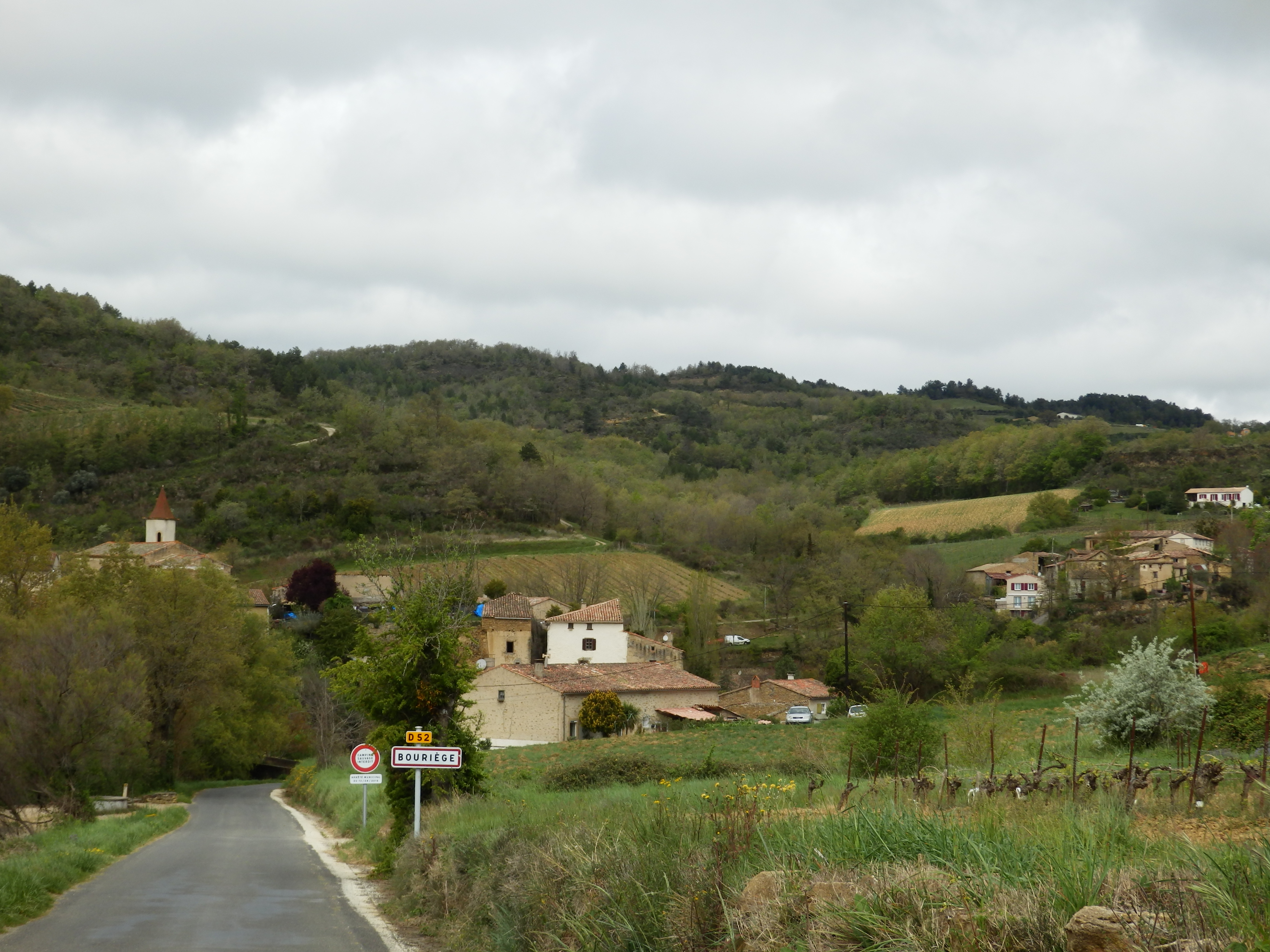
- A general view of Bouriège

- Coat of arms
- Location of Bouriège
- Location within France Location within Occitanie
- Coordinates: 42°59′12″N 2°10′02″E
- Country: France
- Region: Occitania
- Department: Aude
- Arrondissement: Limoux
- Canton: La Région Limouxine

Government
  - Mayor (2020–2026): André Calvet
- Area^{1}: 10.65 km^{2} (4.11 sq mi)
- Elevation: 312 m (1,024 ft)
- Highest elevation: 597 m (1,959 ft)
- Lowest elevation: 273 m (896 ft)
- Population (2023): 151
  - Density: 14.2/km^{2} (36.7/sq mi)
- Time zone: UTC+01:00 (CET)
  - Summer (DST): UTC+02:00 (CEST)
- INSEE/Postal code: 11045 /11300
- ^{1} French Land Register data, which excludes lakes, ponds, glaciers > 1 km^{2} (0.386 sq mi or 247 acres) and river estuaries.

Bouriège (French pronunciation: [buʁjɛʒ]; Occitan: Borièja) is a commune in the Aude department in southern France.

== Population ==
Historical population
Year	Pop.	±% p.a.
1968	160	—
1975	148	−1.11%
1982	152	+0.38%
1990	136	−1.38%
1999	140	+0.32%
2007	143	+0.27%
2012	124	−2.81%
2017	127	+0.48%
2023	151	+2.93%
Source: INSEE

== See also ==
- Communes of the Aude department
