= Tourreilles =

Commune in Occitanie, France

- Commune
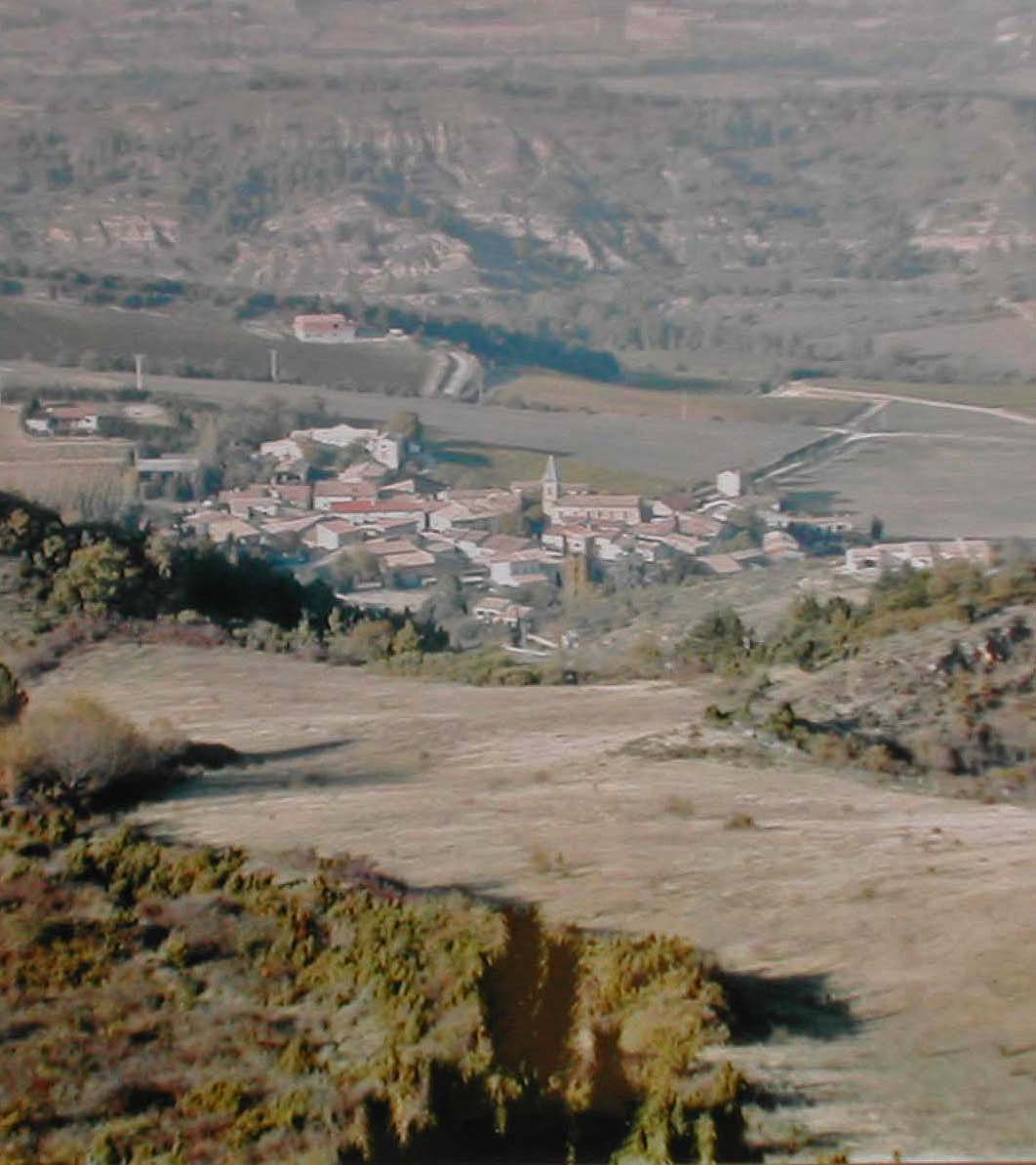
- A general view of Tourreilles

- Coat of arms
- Location of Tourreilles
- Location within France Location within Occitanie
- Coordinates: 43°01′23″N 2°10′16″E
- Country: France
- Region: Occitania
- Department: Aude
- Arrondissement: Limoux
- Canton: La Région Limouxine
- Intercommunality: Limouxin

Government
  - Mayor (2020–2026): Marie-Christine Palomino
- Area^{1}: 6.29 km^{2} (2.43 sq mi)
- Elevation: 350 m (1,150 ft)
- Highest elevation: 597 m (1,959 ft)
- Lowest elevation: 252 m (827 ft)
- Population (2023): 128
  - Density: 20.3/km^{2} (52.7/sq mi)
- Time zone: UTC+01:00 (CET)
  - Summer (DST): UTC+02:00 (CEST)
- INSEE/Postal code: 11394 /11300
- ^{1} French Land Register data, which excludes lakes, ponds, glaciers > 1 km^{2} (0.386 sq mi or 247 acres) and river estuaries.

Tourreilles (French pronunciation: [tuʁɛj]; Occitan: Torrelhas) is a commune in the Aude department in southern France.

== Population ==
Historical population
Year	Pop.	±% p.a.
1968	108	—
1975	103	−0.67%
1982	87	−2.38%
1990	98	+1.50%
1999	93	−0.58%
2007	116	+2.80%
2012	125	+1.51%
2017	127	+0.32%
2023	128	+0.13%
Source: INSEE

== See also ==
- Communes of the Aude department
