= Villebazy =

Commune in Occitanie, France

- Commune
- Coat of arms
- Location of Villebazy
- Location within France Location within Occitanie
- Coordinates: 43°03′55″N 2°19′27″E
- Country: France
- Region: Occitania
- Department: Aude
- Arrondissement: Limoux
- Canton: La Région Limouxine
- Intercommunality: Limouxin

Government
  - Mayor (2020–2026): Guy Sérié
- Area^{1}: 12.18 km^{2} (4.70 sq mi)
- Elevation: 210 m (690 ft)
- Highest elevation: 601 m (1,972 ft)
- Lowest elevation: 197 m (646 ft)
- Population (2023): 140
  - Density: 11/km^{2} (30/sq mi)
- Time zone: UTC+01:00 (CET)
  - Summer (DST): UTC+02:00 (CEST)
- INSEE/Postal code: 11420 /11250
- ^{1} French Land Register data, which excludes lakes, ponds, glaciers > 1 km^{2} (0.386 sq mi or 247 acres) and river estuaries.

Villebazy (French pronunciation: [vilbazi]; Occitan: Vilabasin) is a commune in the Aude department in southern France.

In Villebazy is located the Cantauque Monastery, a Romanian Orthodox monastery founded in 2002.

== Population ==
Historical population
Year	Pop.	±% p.a.
1968	118	—
1975	94	−3.20%
1982	121	+3.67%
1990	95	−2.98%
1999	100	+0.57%
2007	99	−0.13%
2012	123	+4.44%
2017	127	+0.64%
2023	140	+1.64%
Source: INSEE

== See also ==
- Communes of the Aude department
