= Bourigeole =

Commune in Occitanie, France

- Commune
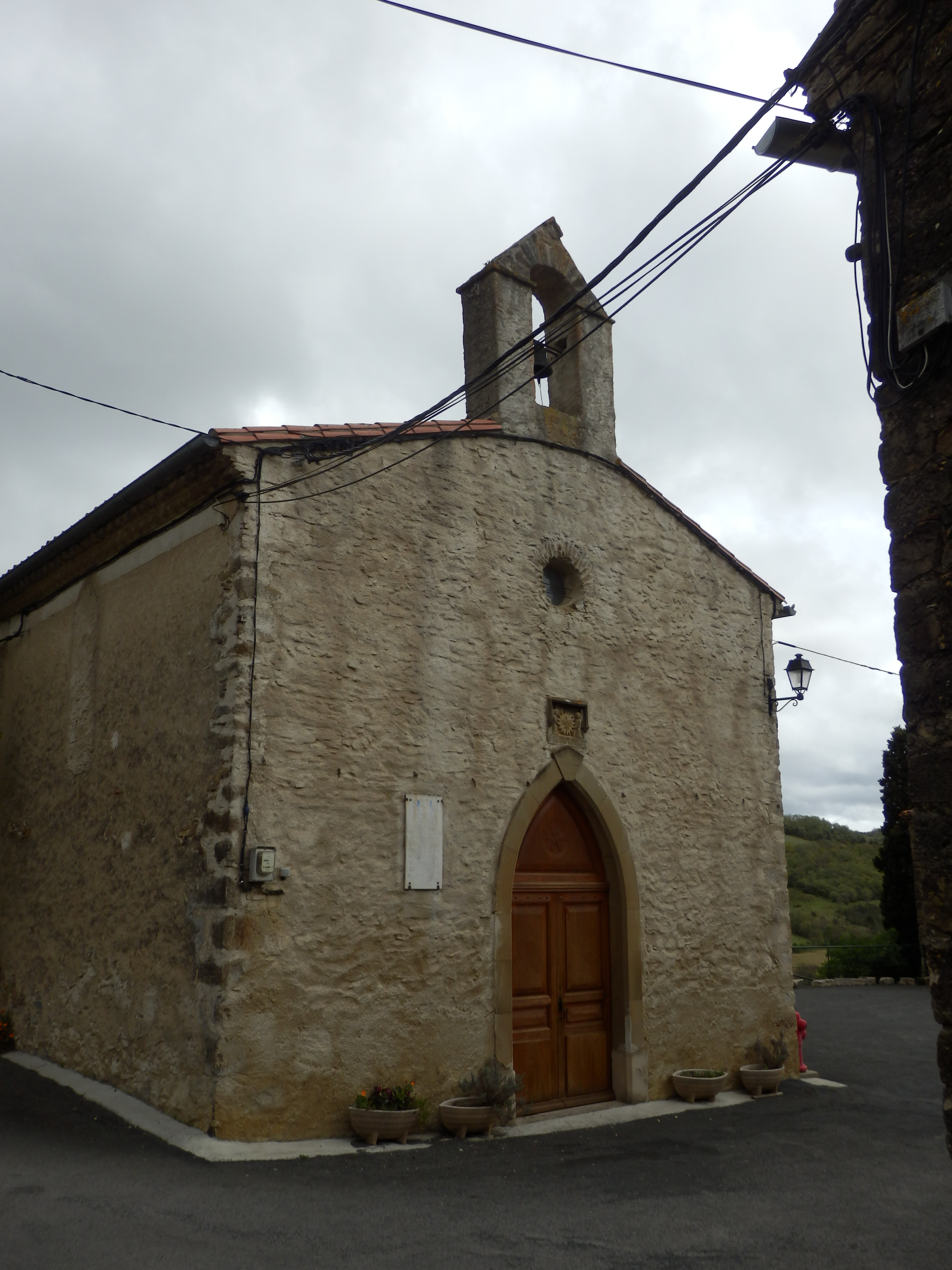
- The church in Bourigeole

- Coat of arms
- Location of Bourigeole
- Location within France Location within Occitanie
- Coordinates: 42°59′20″N 2°08′04″E
- Country: France
- Region: Occitania
- Department: Aude
- Arrondissement: Limoux
- Canton: La Région Limouxine
- Intercommunality: Limouxin

Government
  - Mayor (2020–2026): Thierry Peinado
- Area^{1}: 9.08 km^{2} (3.51 sq mi)
- Elevation: 400 m (1,300 ft)
- Highest elevation: 711 m (2,333 ft)
- Lowest elevation: 315 m (1,033 ft)
- Population (2023): 56
  - Density: 6.2/km^{2} (16/sq mi)
- Time zone: UTC+01:00 (CET)
  - Summer (DST): UTC+02:00 (CEST)
- INSEE/Postal code: 11046 /11300
- ^{1} French Land Register data, which excludes lakes, ponds, glaciers > 1 km^{2} (0.386 sq mi or 247 acres) and river estuaries.

Bourigeole (French pronunciation: [buʁiʒɔl]; Occitan: Borijòla) is a commune in the Aude department in southern France.

== Population ==
Historical population
Year	Pop.	±% p.a.
1968	63	—
1975	50	−3.25%
1982	76	+6.16%
1990	63	−2.32%
1999	54	−1.70%
2007	50	−0.96%
2012	47	−1.23%
2017	51	+1.65%
2023	56	+1.57%
Source: INSEE

== See also ==
- Communes of the Aude department
