= Loupia =

Commune in Occitanie, France

- Commune
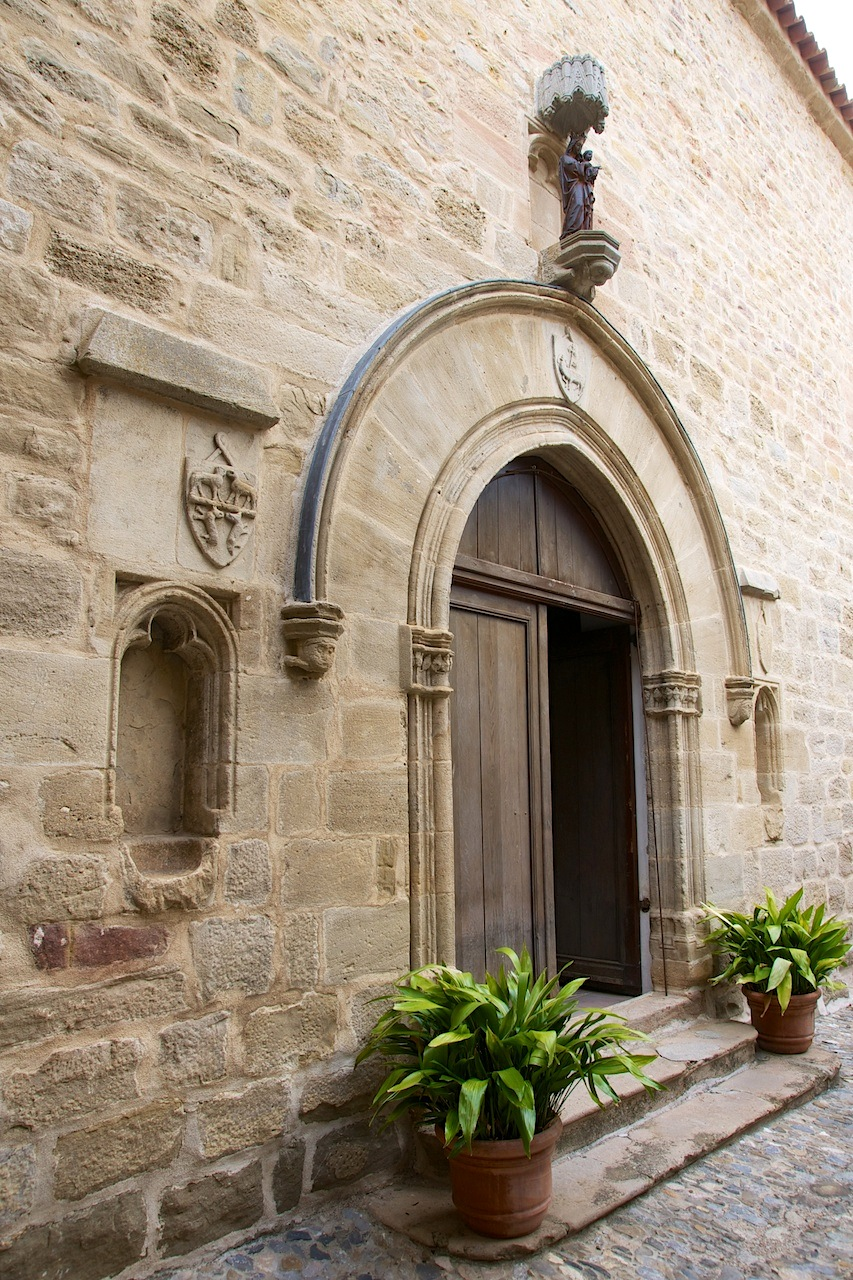
- Entrance to the church

- Coat of arms
- Location of Loupia
- Location within France Location within Occitanie
- Coordinates: 43°03′46″N 2°06′44″E
- Country: France
- Region: Occitania
- Department: Aude
- Arrondissement: Limoux
- Canton: La Région Limouxine

Government
  - Mayor (2020–2026): Olivier Rougé
- Area^{1}: 4.46 km^{2} (1.72 sq mi)
- Elevation: 230 m (750 ft)
- Highest elevation: 388 m (1,273 ft)
- Lowest elevation: 213 m (699 ft)
- Population (2023): 259
  - Density: 58.1/km^{2} (150/sq mi)
- Time zone: UTC+01:00 (CET)
  - Summer (DST): UTC+02:00 (CEST)
- INSEE/Postal code: 11207 /11300
- ^{1} French Land Register data, which excludes lakes, ponds, glaciers > 1 km^{2} (0.386 sq mi or 247 acres) and river estuaries.

Loupia (French pronunciation: [lupja]; Occitan: Lopian) is a commune in the Aude department in southern France.

== Population ==
Historical population
Year	Pop.	±% p.a.
1968	254	—
1975	230	−1.41%
1982	218	−0.76%
1990	221	+0.17%
1999	181	−2.19%
2007	215	+2.18%
2012	240	+2.22%
2017	240	+0.00%
2023	259	+1.28%
Source: INSEE

== See also ==
- Communes of the Aude department
