= Magrie =

Commune in Occitanie, France

- Commune
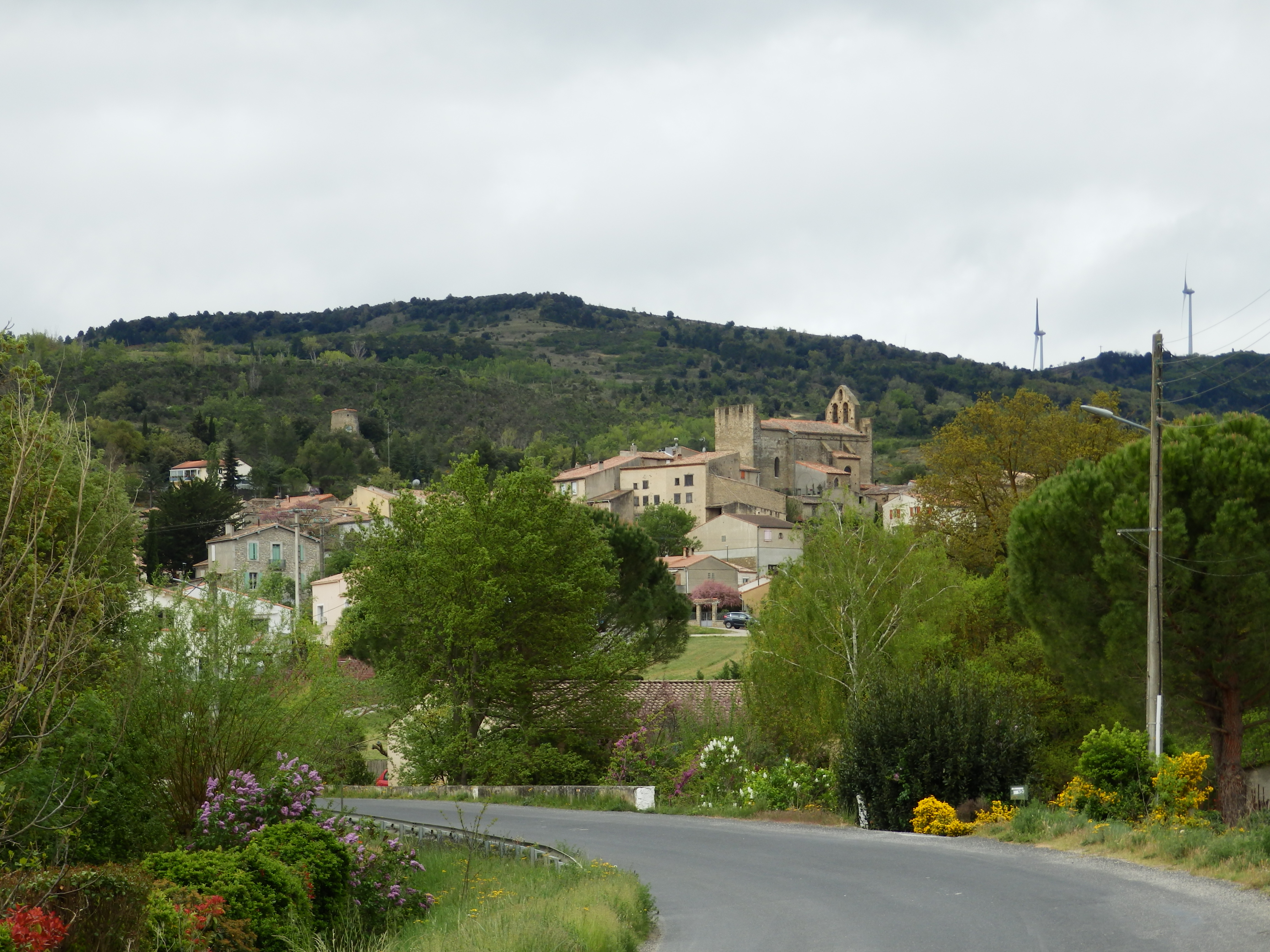
- A general view of Magrie

- Coat of arms
- Location of Magrie
- Location within France Location within Occitanie
- Coordinates: 43°01′46″N 2°12′03″E
- Country: France
- Region: Occitania
- Department: Aude
- Arrondissement: Limoux
- Canton: La Région Limouxine
- Intercommunality: Limouxin

Government
  - Mayor (2023–2026): Christiane Jeanfreu
- Area^{1}: 9.95 km^{2} (3.84 sq mi)
- Elevation: 350 m (1,150 ft)
- Highest elevation: 654 m (2,146 ft)
- Lowest elevation: 179 m (587 ft)
- Population (2023): 547
  - Density: 55.0/km^{2} (142/sq mi)
- Time zone: UTC+01:00 (CET)
  - Summer (DST): UTC+02:00 (CEST)
- INSEE/Postal code: 11211 /11300
- ^{1} French Land Register data, which excludes lakes, ponds, glaciers > 1 km^{2} (0.386 sq mi or 247 acres) and river estuaries.

Magrie (French pronunciation: [maɡʁi]; Occitan: Magria) is a commune in the Aude department in southern France.

== Population ==
Historical population
Year	Pop.	±% p.a.
1968	315	—
1975	296	−0.88%
1982	353	+2.55%
1990	369	+0.56%
1999	421	+1.48%
2007	516	+2.58%
2012	514	−0.08%
2017	528	+0.54%
2023	547	+0.59%
Source: INSEE

== See also ==
- Communes of the Aude department
- List of medieval bridges in France
