= Cantauque Monastery =

Romanian Orthodox monastery in France

Coordinates: 43°3′4″N 2°19′22″E

The monastery of Cantauque, officially the Monastery of the Theotokos and Saint Martin, is a French Orthodox foundation located in southern France, in the commune of Villebazy, about 30 kilometers from Carcassonne, Aude. It was founded in 2002.
