= Castelreng =

Commune in Occitanie, France

- Commune
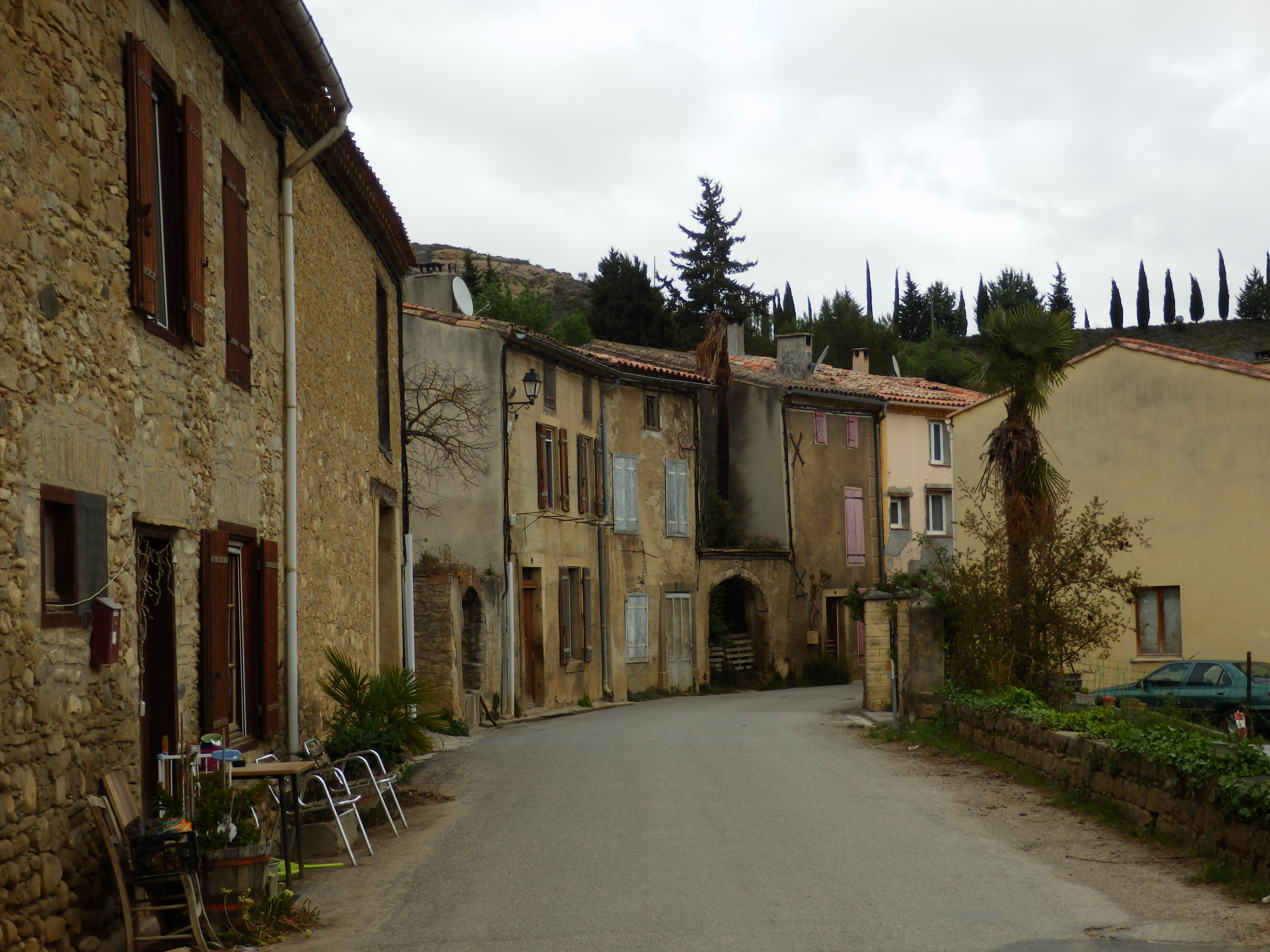
- A view within Castelreng

- Coat of arms
- Location of Castelreng
- Location within France Location within Occitanie
- Coordinates: 43°01′45″N 2°08′18″E
- Country: France
- Region: Occitania
- Department: Aude
- Arrondissement: Limoux
- Canton: La Région Limouxine

Government
  - Mayor (2020–2026): Hervé Garcia
- Area^{1}: 11.02 km^{2} (4.25 sq mi)
- Highest elevation: 572 m (1,877 ft)
- Lowest elevation: 244 m (801 ft)
- Population (2023): 207
  - Density: 18.8/km^{2} (48.7/sq mi)
- Time zone: UTC+01:00 (CET)
  - Summer (DST): UTC+02:00 (CEST)
- INSEE/Postal code: 11078 /11300
- ^{1} French Land Register data, which excludes lakes, ponds, glaciers > 1 km^{2} (0.386 sq mi or 247 acres) and river estuaries.

Castelreng (French pronunciation: [kastɛlʁɛŋɡ]; Occitan: Castèlrenc) [kasˈtɛl.renk] is a commune in the department in the Aude department in the Occitanie region in Southern France.

== Population ==
Its inhabitants are known as Castelrengois.

Historical population
Year	Pop.	±% p.a.
1968	197	—
1975	158	−3.10%
1982	168	+0.88%
1990	174	+0.44%
1999	165	−0.59%
2007	195	+2.11%
2012	198	+0.31%
2017	207	+0.89%
2023	207	+0.00%
Source: INSEE

== See also ==
- Communes of the Aude department
