= Gaja-et-Villedieu =

Commune in Occitanie, France

- Commune
- Coat of arms
- Location of Gaja-et-Villedieu
- Location within France Location within Occitanie
- Coordinates: 43°04′56″N 2°11′16″E
- Country: France
- Region: Occitania
- Department: Aude
- Arrondissement: Limoux
- Canton: La Région Limouxine
- Intercommunality: Limouxin

Government
  - Mayor (2020–2026): Hélène Mas
- Area^{1}: 7.75 km^{2} (2.99 sq mi)
- Elevation: 150 m (490 ft)
- Highest elevation: 305 m (1,001 ft)
- Lowest elevation: 167 m (548 ft)
- Population (2023): 306
  - Density: 39.5/km^{2} (102/sq mi)
- Time zone: UTC+01:00 (CET)
  - Summer (DST): UTC+02:00 (CEST)
- INSEE/Postal code: 11158 /11300
- ^{1} French Land Register data, which excludes lakes, ponds, glaciers > 1 km^{2} (0.386 sq mi or 247 acres) and river estuaries.

Gaja-et-Villedieu (French pronunciation: [gaʒa e vildjø]; Occitan: Gajan e Viladieus) is a commune in the Aude department in southern France.

== Population ==
Historical population
Year	Pop.	±% p.a.
1968	216	—
1975	199	−1.16%
1982	220	+1.44%
1990	231	+0.61%
1999	266	+1.58%
2007	305	+1.72%
2012	292	−0.87%
2017	292	+0.00%
2023	306	+0.78%
Source: INSEE

== See also ==
- Communes of the Aude department
