= Saint-Couat-du-Razès =

Commune in Occitanie, France

- Commune
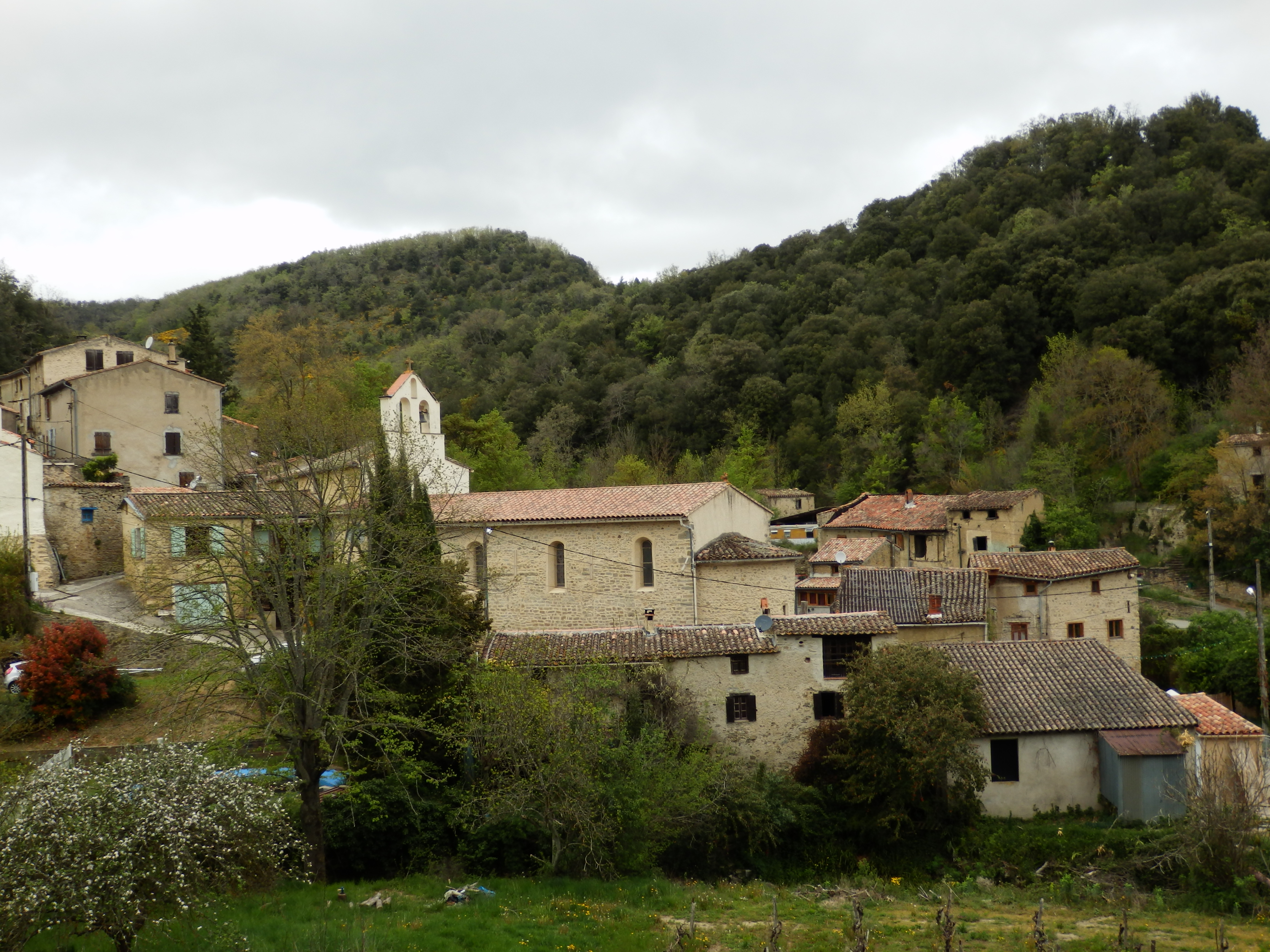
- A general view of Saint-Couat-du-Razès

- Coat of arms
- Location of Saint-Couat-du-Razès
- Location within France Location within Occitanie
- Coordinates: 43°00′05″N 2°06′38″E
- Country: France
- Region: Occitania
- Department: Aude
- Arrondissement: Limoux
- Canton: La Région Limouxine
- Intercommunality: Limouxin

Government
  - Mayor (2020–2026): Frédéric Sadori
- Area^{1}: 6.4 km^{2} (2.5 sq mi)
- Elevation: 320 m (1,050 ft)
- Highest elevation: 681 m (2,234 ft)
- Lowest elevation: 340 m (1,120 ft)
- Population (2023): 46
  - Density: 7.2/km^{2} (19/sq mi)
- Time zone: UTC+01:00 (CET)
  - Summer (DST): UTC+02:00 (CEST)
- INSEE/Postal code: 11338 /11300
- ^{1} French Land Register data, which excludes lakes, ponds, glaciers > 1 km^{2} (0.386 sq mi or 247 acres) and river estuaries.

Saint-Couat-du-Razès (French pronunciation: [sɛ̃ kwa dy ʁazɛ]) is a commune in the Aude department in southern France. The name "Saint-Couat" is likely derived from "Saint-Cucuphat", the patron saint of the village church.

== Population ==
Historical population
Year	Pop.	±% p.a.
1968	44	—
1975	43	−0.33%
1982	56	+3.85%
1990	46	−2.43%
1999	49	+0.70%
2007	54	+1.22%
2012	62	+2.80%
2017	51	−3.83%
2023	46	−1.71%
Source: INSEE

== See also ==
- Communes of the Aude department
