= Greffeil =

Commune in Occitanie, France

- Commune
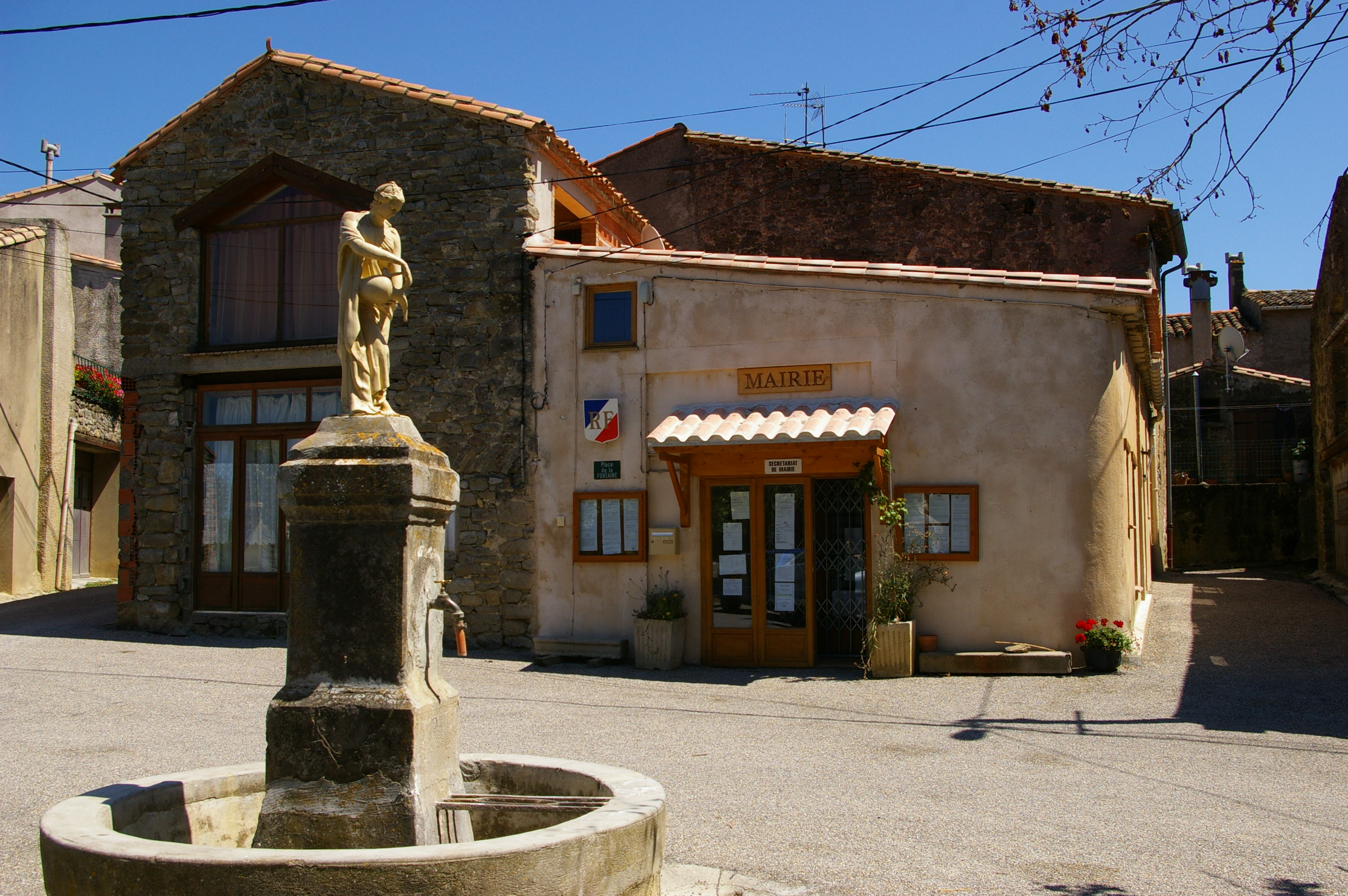
- Fountain and town hall

- Coat of arms
- Location of Greffeil
- Location within France Location within Occitanie
- Coordinates: 43°04′46″N 2°22′47″E
- Country: France
- Region: Occitania
- Department: Aude
- Arrondissement: Limoux
- Canton: La Région Limouxine

Government
  - Mayor (2020–2026): Jean-Marc Wagner
- Area^{1}: 13.67 km^{2} (5.28 sq mi)
- Elevation: 290 m (950 ft)
- Highest elevation: 640 m (2,100 ft)
- Lowest elevation: 219 m (719 ft)
- Population (2023): 100
  - Density: 7.3/km^{2} (19/sq mi)
- Time zone: UTC+01:00 (CET)
  - Summer (DST): UTC+02:00 (CEST)
- INSEE/Postal code: 11169 /11250
- ^{1} French Land Register data, which excludes lakes, ponds, glaciers > 1 km^{2} (0.386 sq mi or 247 acres) and river estuaries.

Greffeil (French pronunciation: [ɡʁɛfɛj]; Occitan: Grefuèlh) is a commune in the Aude department in southern France.

== Population ==
Historical population
Year	Pop.	±% p.a.
1968	75	—
1975	68	−1.39%
1982	68	+0.00%
1990	61	−1.35%
1999	76	+2.47%
2007	70	−1.02%
2012	88	+4.68%
2017	79	−2.13%
2023	100	+4.01%
Source: INSEE

== See also ==
- Communes of the Aude department
