= Pauligne =

Commune in Occitanie, France

- Commune
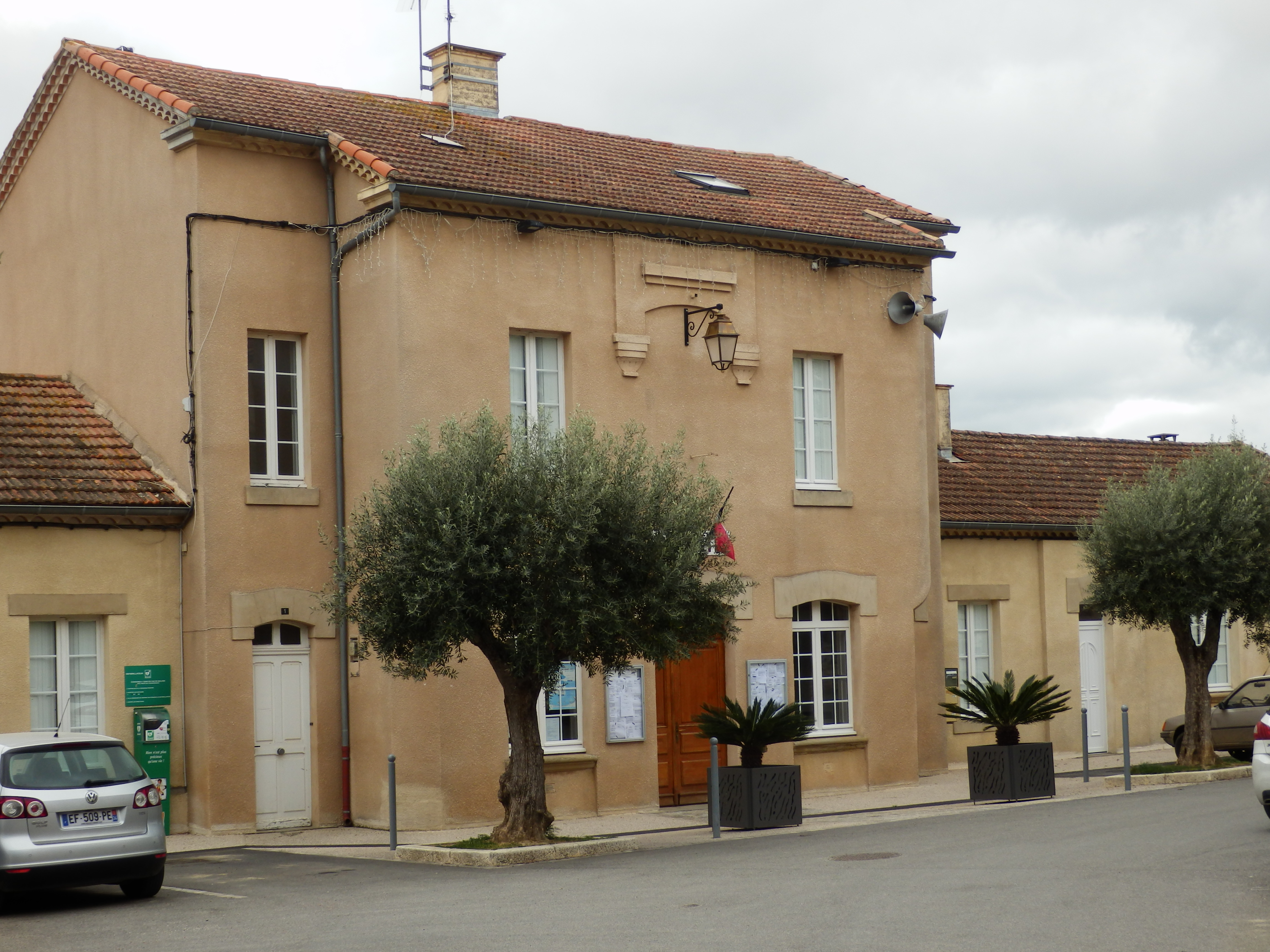
- The town hall in Pauligne

- Coat of arms
- Location of Pauligne
- Location within France Location within Occitanie
- Coordinates: 43°04′28″N 2°09′43″E
- Country: France
- Region: Occitania
- Department: Aude
- Arrondissement: Limoux
- Canton: La Région Limouxine
- Intercommunality: Limouxin

Government
  - Mayor (2020–2026): Jean-Marie Teulier
- Area^{1}: 6.06 km^{2} (2.34 sq mi)
- Elevation: 200 m (660 ft)
- Highest elevation: 350 m (1,150 ft)
- Lowest elevation: 191 m (627 ft)
- Population (2023): 357
  - Density: 58.9/km^{2} (153/sq mi)
- Time zone: UTC+01:00 (CET)
  - Summer (DST): UTC+02:00 (CEST)
- INSEE/Postal code: 11274 /11300
- ^{1} French Land Register data, which excludes lakes, ponds, glaciers > 1 km^{2} (0.386 sq mi or 247 acres) and river estuaries.

Pauligne (French pronunciation: [poliɲ]; Occitan: Paulinha) is a commune in the Aude department in southern France.

== Population ==
Historical population
Year	Pop.	±% p.a.
1968	328	—
1975	275	−2.49%
1982	270	−0.26%
1990	314	+1.91%
1999	297	−0.62%
2007	329	+1.29%
2012	332	+0.18%
2017	357	+1.46%
2023	357	+0.00%
Source: INSEE

== See also ==
- Communes of the Aude department
