= Canton of La Région Limouxine =

Coordinates: 43.05°N 2.22°E

- Canton
- Situation of the canton of La Région Limouxine in the department of Aude
- Country: France
- Region: Occitania
- Department: Aude
- No. of communes: {{{nbcomm}}}
- Population (2023): 20,424
- INSEE code: 1109

The canton of La Région Limouxine (before 2015: canton of Limoux) is an administrative division of the Aude department, southern France. Its borders were modified at the French canton reorganisation which came into effect in March 2015. Its seat is in Limoux.

It consists of the following communes:

1. Ajac
2. Alet-les-Bains
3. Belcastel-et-Buc
4. La Bezole
5. Bouriège
6. Bourigeole
7. Castelreng
8. Caunette-sur-Lauquet
9. Cépie
10. Clermont-sur-Lauquet
11. Cournanel
12. La Digne-d'Amont
13. La Digne-d'Aval
14. Festes-et-Saint-André
15. Gaja-et-Villedieu
16. Gardie
17. Greffeil
18. Ladern-sur-Lauquet
19. Limoux
20. Loupia
21. Magrie
22. Malras
23. Pauligne
24. Pieusse
25. Pomas
26. Saint-Couat-du-Razès
27. Saint-Hilaire
28. Saint-Martin-de-Villereglan
29. Saint-Polycarpe
30. Tourreilles
31. Véraza
32. Villar-Saint-Anselme
33. Villardebelle
34. Villebazy
35. Villelongue-d'Aude
