= Festes-et-Saint-André =

Commune in Occitanie, France

- Commune
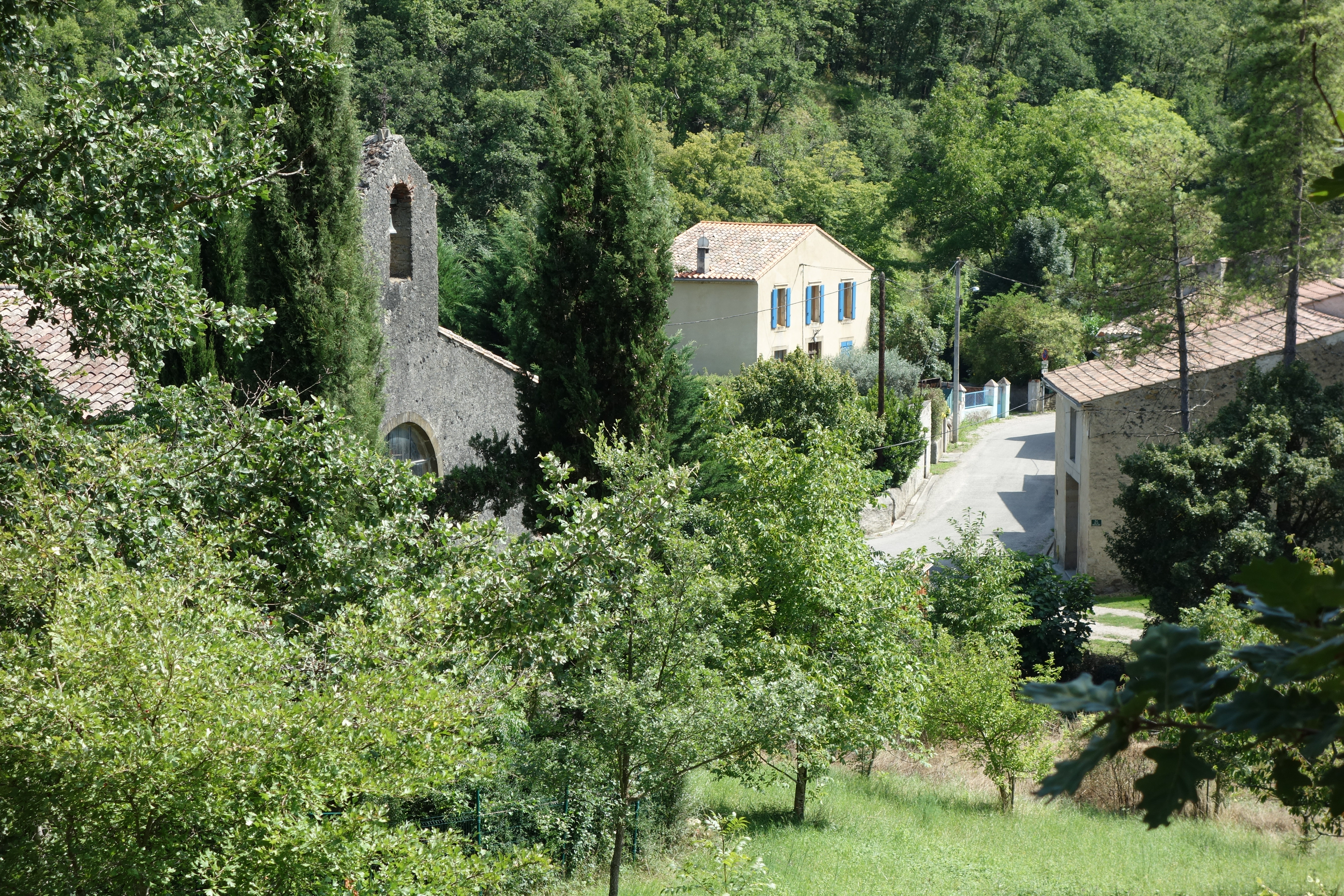
- The church and surroundings in Festes-et-Saint-André

- Coat of arms
- Location of Festes-et-Saint-André
- Location within France Location within Occitanie
- Coordinates: 42°58′29″N 2°08′47″E
- Country: France
- Region: Occitania
- Department: Aude
- Arrondissement: Limoux
- Canton: La Région Limouxine

Government
  - Mayor (2020–2026): Eulalie Pinto
- Area^{1}: 18.07 km^{2} (6.98 sq mi)
- Elevation: 300 m (980 ft)
- Highest elevation: 760 m (2,490 ft)
- Lowest elevation: 323 m (1,060 ft)
- Population (2023): 185
  - Density: 10.2/km^{2} (26.5/sq mi)
- Time zone: UTC+01:00 (CET)
  - Summer (DST): UTC+02:00 (CEST)
- INSEE/Postal code: 11142 /11300
- ^{1} French Land Register data, which excludes lakes, ponds, glaciers > 1 km^{2} (0.386 sq mi or 247 acres) and river estuaries.

Festes-et-Saint-André (French pronunciation: [fɛst e sɛ̃.t‿ɑ̃dʁe]; Occitan: Fèstas e Sant Andrieu) is a commune in the Aude department in southern France.

== Population ==
Historical population
Year	Pop.	±% p.a.
1968	105	—
1975	112	+0.93%
1982	159	+5.13%
1990	201	+2.97%
1999	202	+0.06%
2007	210	+0.49%
2012	192	−1.78%
2017	206	+1.42%
2023	185	−1.78%
Source: INSEE

== See also ==
- Communes of the Aude department
