= Saint-Martin-de-Villereglan =

Commune in Occitanie, France

- Commune
- Coat of arms
- Location of Saint-Martin-de-Villereglan
- Location within France Location within Occitanie
- Coordinates: 43°06′25″N 2°12′43″E
- Country: France
- Region: Occitania
- Department: Aude
- Arrondissement: Limoux
- Canton: La Région Limouxine
- Intercommunality: Limouxin

Government
  - Mayor (2020–2026): Pierre Bardies
- Area^{1}: 9.38 km^{2} (3.62 sq mi)
- Elevation: 167 m (548 ft)
- Highest elevation: 309 m (1,014 ft)
- Lowest elevation: 149 m (489 ft)
- Population (2023): 403
  - Density: 43.0/km^{2} (111/sq mi)
- Time zone: UTC+01:00 (CET)
  - Summer (DST): UTC+02:00 (CEST)
- INSEE/Postal code: 11355 /11300
- ^{1} French Land Register data, which excludes lakes, ponds, glaciers > 1 km^{2} (0.386 sq mi or 247 acres) and river estuaries.

Saint-Martin-de-Villereglan (French pronunciation: [sɛ̃ maʁtɛ̃ də vilʁeglɑ̃]; also Saint-Martin-de-Villeréglan; Occitan: Sant Martin de Vilareglan) is a commune in the Aude department in southern France.

== Population ==
Historical population
Year	Pop.	±% p.a.
1968	227	—
1975	172	−3.89%
1982	190	+1.43%
1990	223	+2.02%
1999	248	+1.19%
2007	325	+3.44%
2012	359	+2.01%
2017	363	+0.22%
2023	403	+1.76%
Source: INSEE

== See also ==
- Communes of the Aude department
