= Villar-Saint-Anselme =

Commune in Occitanie, France

- Commune
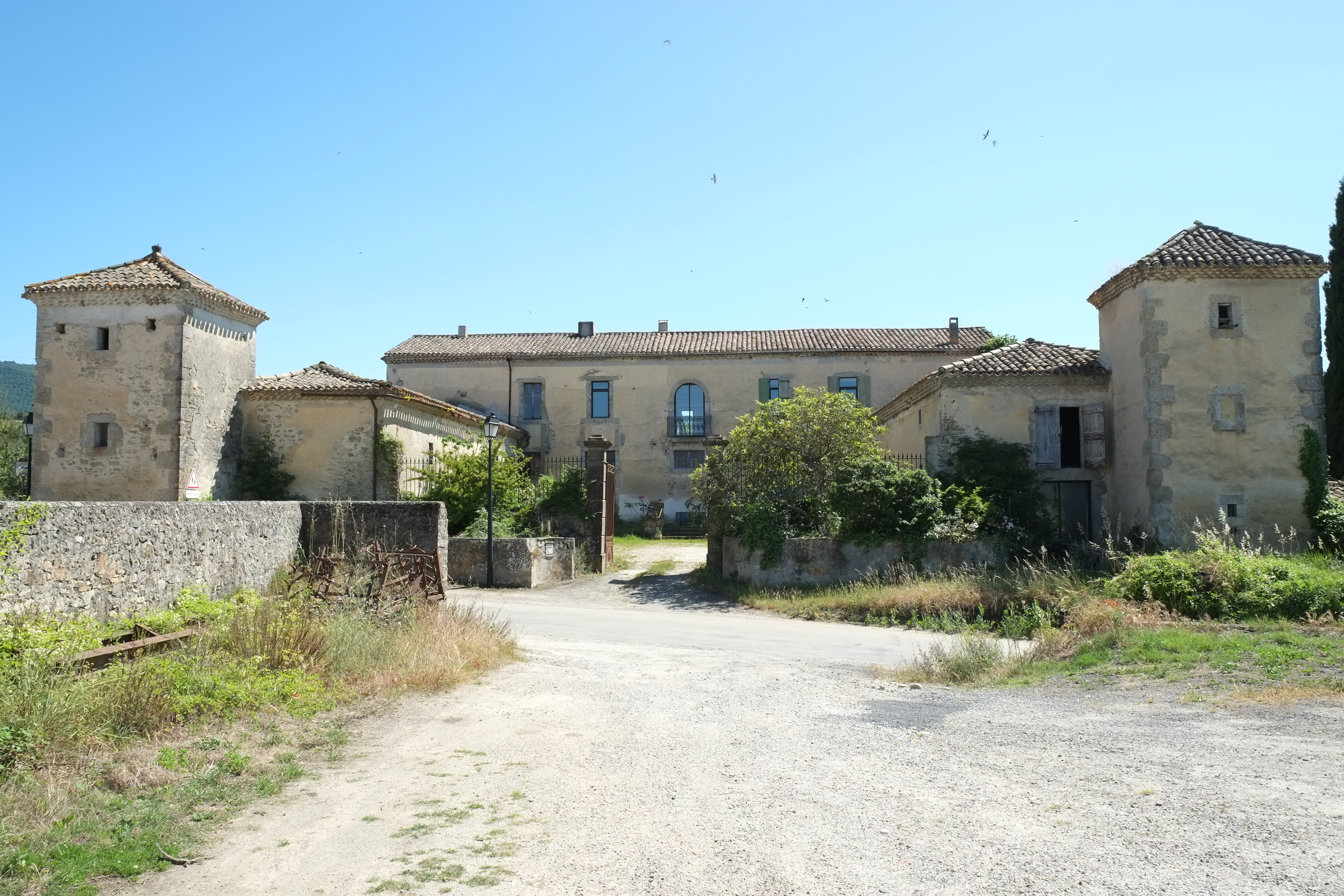
- The chateau in Villar-Saint-Anselme

- Coat of arms
- Location of Villar-Saint-Anselme
- Location within France Location within Occitanie
- Coordinates: 43°03′17″N 2°17′57″E
- Country: France
- Region: Occitania
- Department: Aude
- Arrondissement: Limoux
- Canton: La Région Limouxine

Government
  - Mayor (2020–2026): Eric Grauby
- Area^{1}: 5.88 km^{2} (2.27 sq mi)
- Elevation: 250 m (820 ft)
- Highest elevation: 424 m (1,391 ft)
- Lowest elevation: 210 m (690 ft)
- Population (2023): 113
  - Density: 19.2/km^{2} (49.8/sq mi)
- Time zone: UTC+01:00 (CET)
  - Summer (DST): UTC+02:00 (CEST)
- INSEE/Postal code: 11415 /11250
- ^{1} French Land Register data, which excludes lakes, ponds, glaciers > 1 km^{2} (0.386 sq mi or 247 acres) and river estuaries.

Villar-Saint-Anselme (French pronunciation: [vilaʁ sɛ̃t‿ɑ̃sɛlm]; Occitan: Le Vilar de Monsenh Ancel) is a commune in the Aude department in southern France.

== Population ==
Historical population
Year	Pop.	±% p.a.
1968	141	—
1975	120	−2.28%
1982	117	−0.36%
1990	112	−0.54%
1999	94	−1.93%
2007	91	−0.40%
2012	98	+1.49%
2017	121	+4.31%
2023	113	−1.13%
Source: INSEE

== See also ==
- Communes of the Aude department
