= La Digne-d'Aval =

Commune in Occitanie, France

- Commune
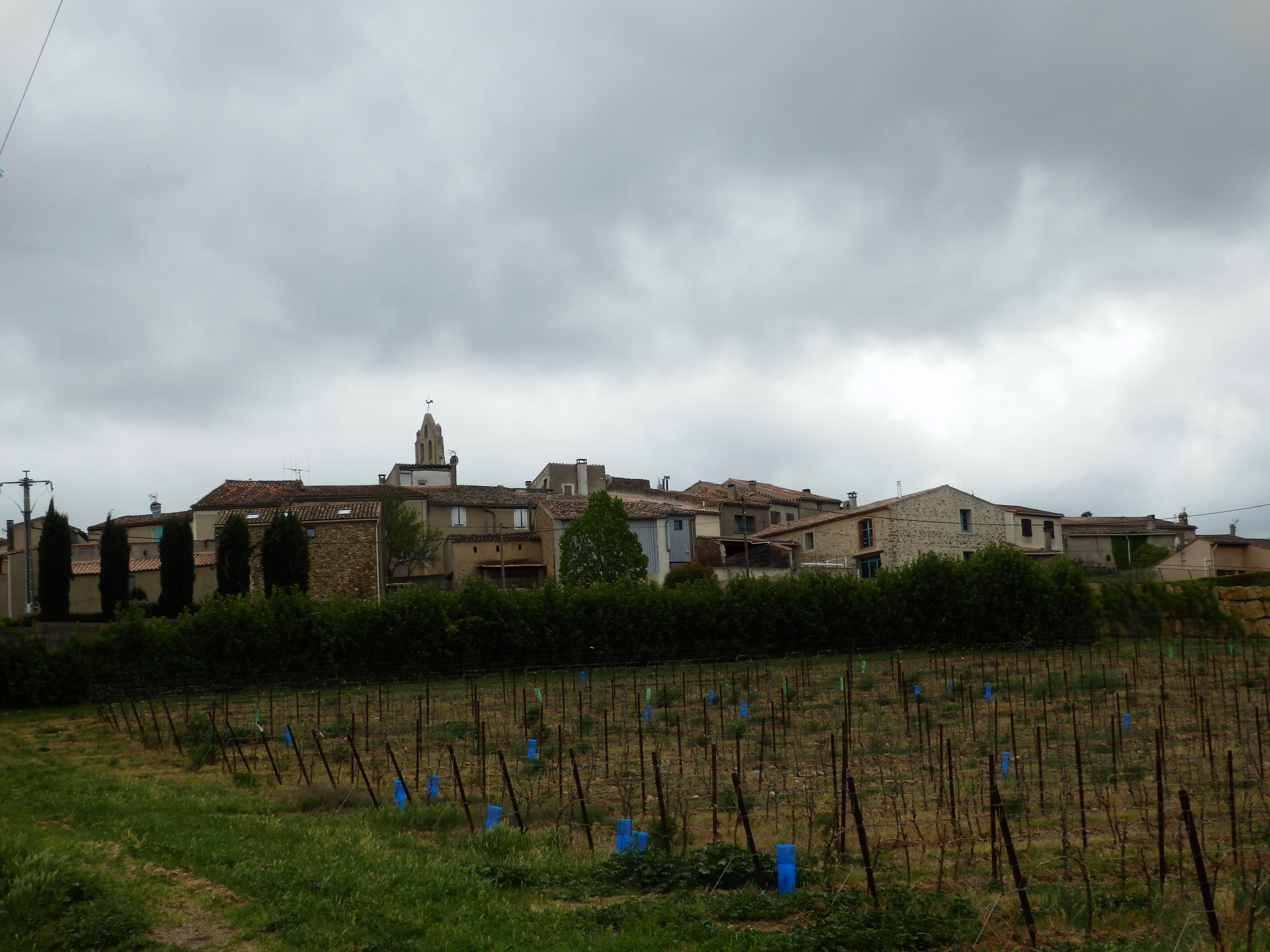
- A general view of La Digne-d'Aval

- Coat of arms
- Location of La Digne-d'Aval
- Location within France Location within Occitanie
- Coordinates: 43°02′49″N 2°10′50″E
- Country: France
- Region: Occitania
- Department: Aude
- Arrondissement: Limoux
- Canton: La Région Limouxine
- Intercommunality: Limouxin

Government
  - Mayor (2020–2026): Denis Mounié
- Area^{1}: 3.14 km^{2} (1.21 sq mi)
- Elevation: 250 m (820 ft)
- Highest elevation: 380 m (1,250 ft)
- Lowest elevation: 191 m (627 ft)
- Population (2023): 522
  - Density: 166/km^{2} (431/sq mi)
- Time zone: UTC+01:00 (CET)
  - Summer (DST): UTC+02:00 (CEST)
- INSEE/Postal code: 11120 /11300
- ^{1} French Land Register data, which excludes lakes, ponds, glaciers > 1 km^{2} (0.386 sq mi or 247 acres) and river estuaries.

La Digne-d'Aval (French pronunciation: [la diɲ daval]; Occitan: Ladinha d'Aval) is a commune in the Aude department in southern France.

It is home to several wine producers including Faure and Doutre. It is located approximately 2 km (1.2 mi) from the nearest town, Limoux.

== Population ==
Historical population
Year	Pop.	±% p.a.
1968	164	—
1975	193	+2.35%
1982	307	+6.86%
1990	422	+4.06%
1999	493	+1.74%
2007	575	+1.94%
2012	534	−1.47%
2017	536	+0.07%
2023	522	−0.44%
Source: INSEE

== See also ==
- Communes of the Aude department
