= La Digne-d'Amont =

Commune in Occitanie, France

- Commune
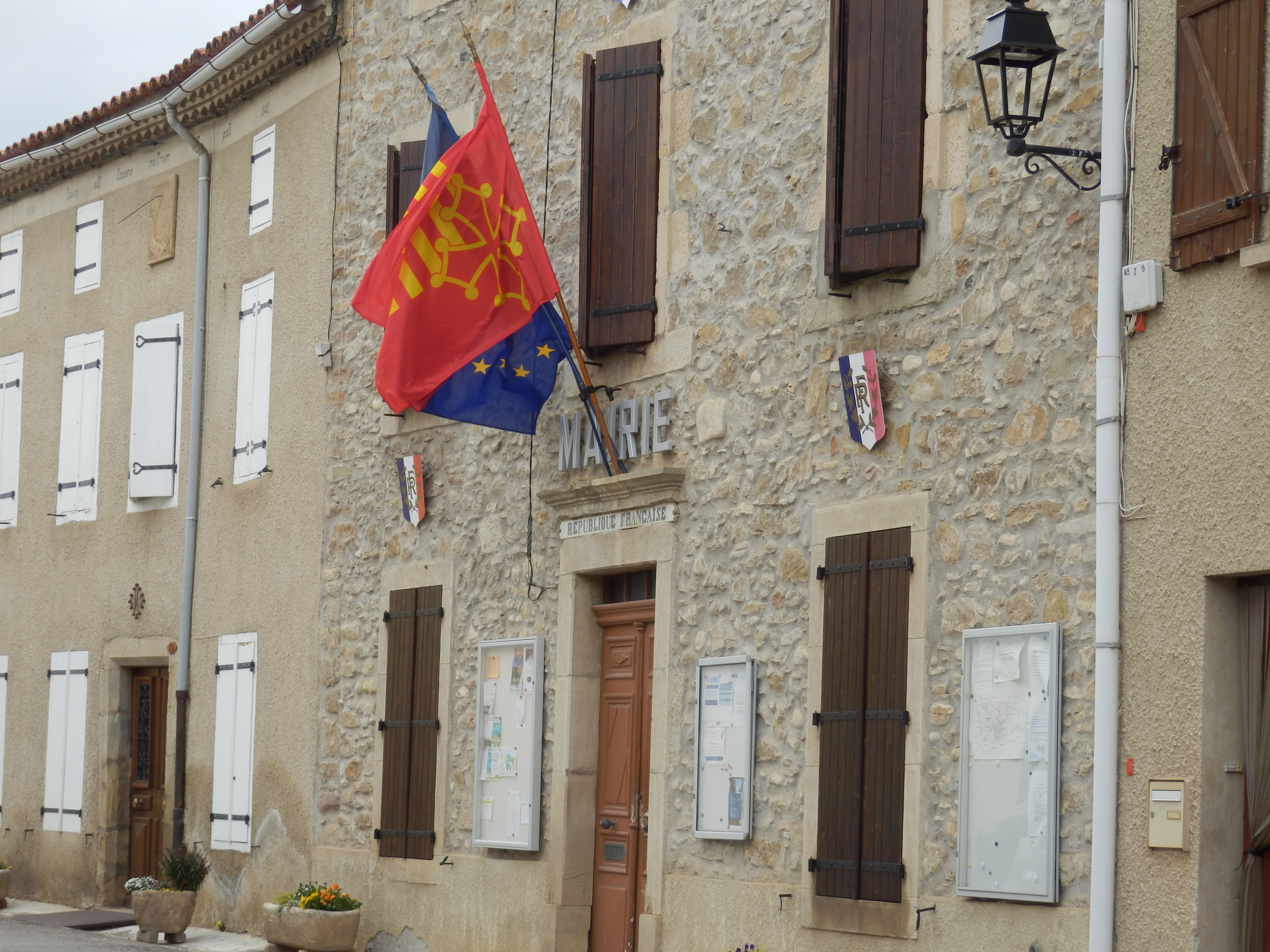
- The town hall in La Digne-d'Amont

- Coat of arms
- Location of La Digne-d'Amont
- Location within France Location within Occitanie
- Coordinates: 43°02′33″N 2°09′38″E
- Country: France
- Region: Occitania
- Department: Aude
- Arrondissement: Limoux
- Canton: La Région Limouxine
- Intercommunality: Limouxin

Government
  - Mayor (2020–2026): Jean Labadie
- Area^{1}: 3.61 km^{2} (1.39 sq mi)
- Elevation: 163 m (535 ft)
- Highest elevation: 380 m (1,250 ft)
- Lowest elevation: 208 m (682 ft)
- Population (2023): 286
  - Density: 79.2/km^{2} (205/sq mi)
- Time zone: UTC+01:00 (CET)
  - Summer (DST): UTC+02:00 (CEST)
- INSEE/Postal code: 11119 /11300
- ^{1} French Land Register data, which excludes lakes, ponds, glaciers > 1 km^{2} (0.386 sq mi or 247 acres) and river estuaries.

La Digne-d'Amont (French pronunciation: [la diɲ damɔ̃]; Occitan: Ladinha d'Amont) is a commune in the Aude department in southern France.

== Population ==
Historical population
Year	Pop.	±% p.a.
1968	163	—
1975	142	−1.95%
1982	211	+5.82%
1990	256	+2.45%
1999	252	−0.17%
2007	275	+1.10%
2012	289	+1.00%
2017	287	−0.14%
2023	286	−0.06%
Source: INSEE

== See also ==
- Communes of the Aude department
