= Barbaira =

Commune in Occitanie, France

- Commune
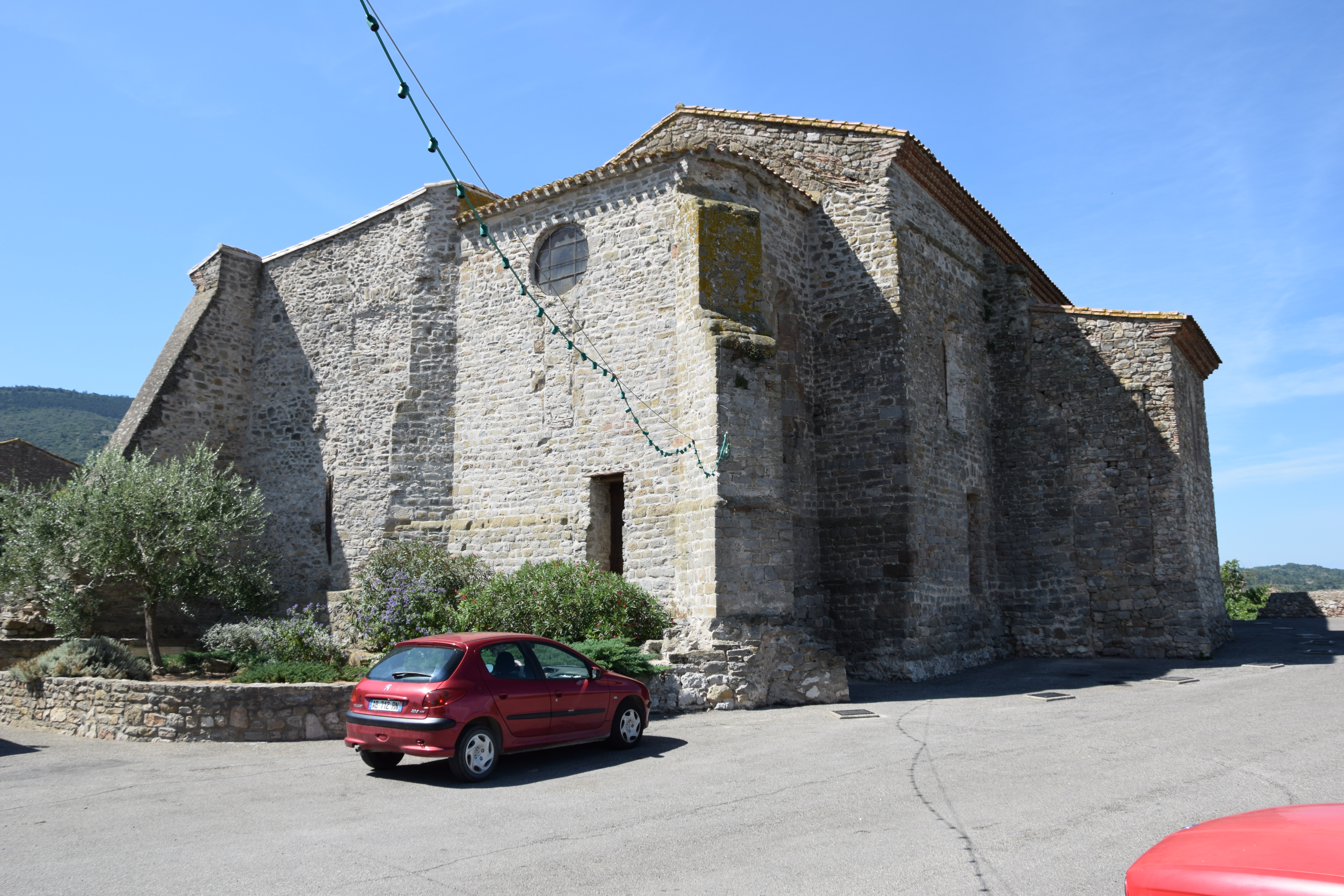
- The Church of Saint-Julien

- Coat of arms
- Location of Barbaira
- Location within France Location within Occitanie
- Coordinates: 43°11′09″N 2°30′46″E
- Country: France
- Region: Occitania
- Department: Aude
- Arrondissement: Carcassonne
- Canton: La Montagne d'Alaric
- Intercommunality: Carcassonne Agglo

Government
  - Mayor (2020–2026): Jacques Fabre
- Area^{1}: 9.40 km^{2} (3.63 sq mi)
- Elevation: 75 m (246 ft)
- Highest elevation: 502 m (1,647 ft)
- Lowest elevation: 66 m (217 ft)
- Population (2023): 805
  - Density: 85.6/km^{2} (222/sq mi)
- Time zone: UTC+01:00 (CET)
  - Summer (DST): UTC+02:00 (CEST)
- INSEE/Postal code: 11027 /11800
- ^{1} French Land Register data, which excludes lakes, ponds, glaciers > 1 km^{2} (0.386 sq mi or 247 acres) and river estuaries.

Barbaira (French pronunciation: [baʁbɛʁa]; Occitan: Barbairan) is a commune in the Aude department in the Occitanie region of southern France.

== Geography ==
Barbaira is located in the Corbières Massif, at the foot of Mount Alaric in the urban area of Carcassonne some 15 km (9.3 mi) east of the city. Access to the commune is by the D6113 road from Floure in the west which passes through the north of the commune and the village before continuing east to Capendu. The A61 autoroute passes through the centre of the commune from west to east but there is no exit in the commune. The nearest exit is Exit 24 some 7 km (4.3 mi) to the west of the commune which links to the D6113. A railway passes through commune and the village from west to east but has no station in or near the commune. The commune is farmland in the north with the slopes of the mountain in the south forested.

The Aude river forms the northern border of the commune as it flows east to join the Mediterranean Sea south-west of Valras-Plage. Several streams rise in the south of the commune and flow north to join the Aude including the Ruisseau de la Pelliere. The Ruisseau de Saint-Jean rises in the far south-east of the commune and flows north then east to join the Ruisseau de la Tuilerie.

=== Heraldry ===
Arms of Barbaira	The official status of the blazon remains to be determined. Blazon: Azure, a chevron of Or.

== Administration ==
List of Successive Mayors

Mayors from the French Revolution to 1936

From	To	Name
1792	1796	Pierre Agussol
1796	1797	Laurens Marty
1797	1798	Jean Besiat
1798	1800	Pierre Agussol
1800	1806	François Bel
1806	1813	Noël Bel
1813	1816	Pierre Agussol
1816	1818	Pierre Huillet
1818	1819	Jacques Huillet
1819	1821	Jean Baptiste Dalbès
1821	1826	Jacques Cabrié
1826	1829	Jacques Huillet
1829	1830	Louis Pascal Marty
1830	1840	Antoine Bel
1840	1846	Adrien Bel
1846	1869	Philippe Aybram
1869	1870	Pierre Robert
1870	1871	Alcide Jeantet
1871	1876	Pierre Bel
1876	1882	Alcide Jeantot
1882	1884	Maurice Prouzet
1884	1888	Félix Joucla
1888	1892	Maurice Prouzet
1892	1900	Casimir Rigaud
1900	1919	Auguste Robert
1919	1936	François Sarda

Mayors from 1936

From	To	Name
1936	1944	Etienne Daydé
1944	1953	François Viguier
1953	1965	Jean Vibes
1965	1995	Emile Bacquier
1995	2014	Robert Amouroux
2014	2026	Jacques Fabre

== Demography ==
The inhabitants of the commune are known as Barbairanais or Barbairanaises in French.

Historical population

Year	Pop.	±% p.a.
1793	318	—
1821	383	+0.67%
1846	383	+0.00%
1872	488	+0.94%
1901	594	+0.68%
1926	647	+0.34%
1946	558	−0.74%
1962	510	−0.56%
1968	512	+0.07%

Year	Pop.	±% p.a.
1975	503	−0.25%
1982	473	−0.87%
1990	474	+0.03%
1999	523	+1.10%
2007	649	+2.73%
2012	745	+2.80%
2017	750	+0.13%
2023	805	+1.19%

Source: EHESS and INSEE

== Economy ==
=== Industry ===
There is a Compressor station for the TIGF natural gas network.

=== Agriculture ===
The commune is part of the zone for the qualitative names:

- Vin de pays des coteaux de Miramont (Vin de Pays from the slopes of Miramont)
- Vignoble de la Montagne d'Alaric (Vineyards of Mount Alaric) which is part of the Corbières AOC

== Culture and heritage ==
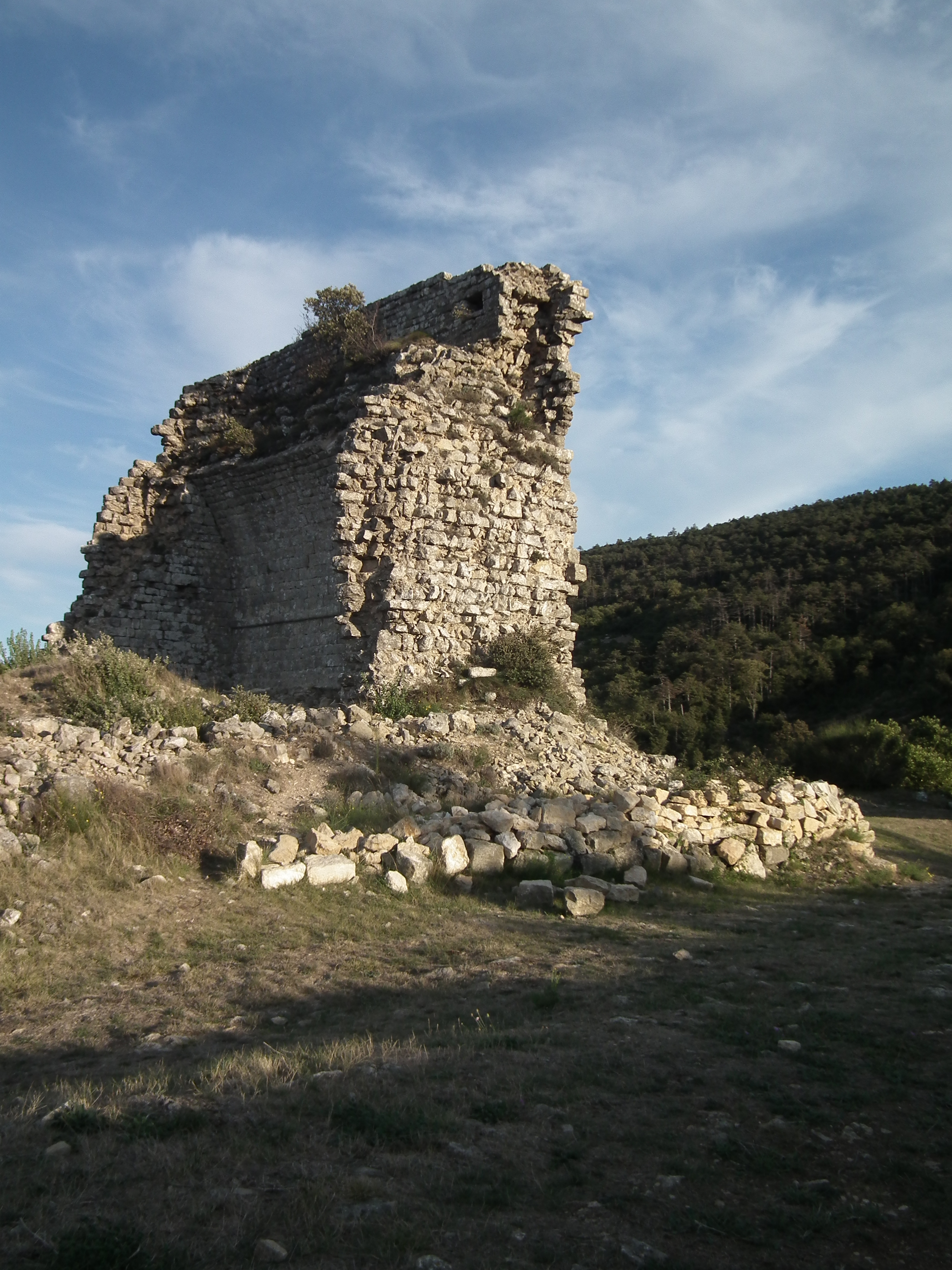
Ruins of the Château of Miramont

=== Civil heritage ===
- The remains of the Chateau of Miramont (Middle Ages) are registered as an historical monument.

=== Religious heritage ===
- The Church of Saint-Julien-Sainte-Basilisse (12th century) is registered as an historical monument. The Church contains two items that are registered as historical objects:
  - A Baptismal font (18th century)
  - A Statue: Virgin and child (17th century)

== Notable people linked to the commune ==
- Chabert de Barbeira

== See also ==
- Corbières AOC
- Communes of the Aude department
