= Corbières AOC =

Wine label in France

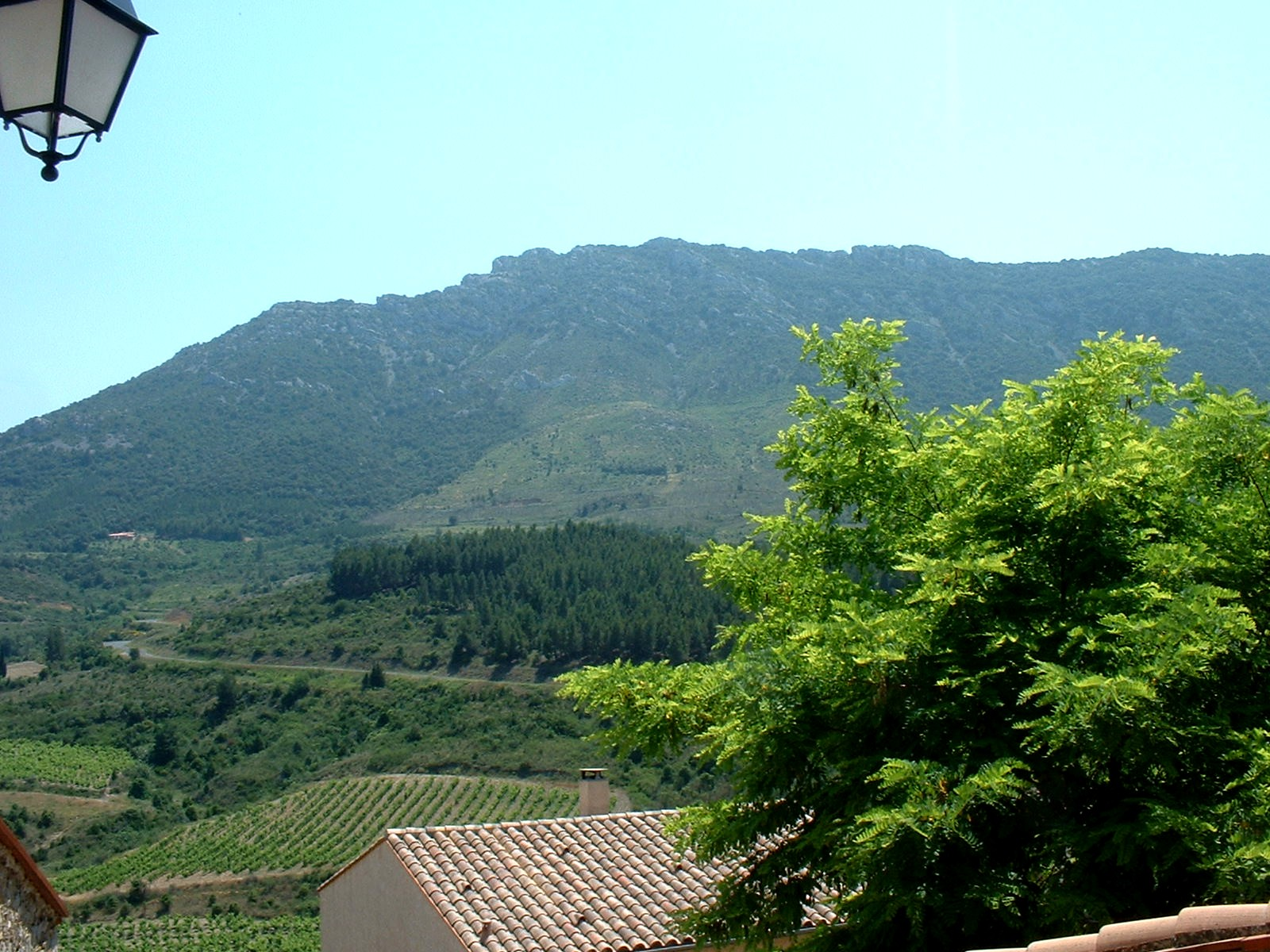
Vineyards in Cucugnan.

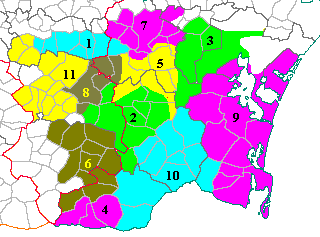
Map of the terroirs of Corbières.

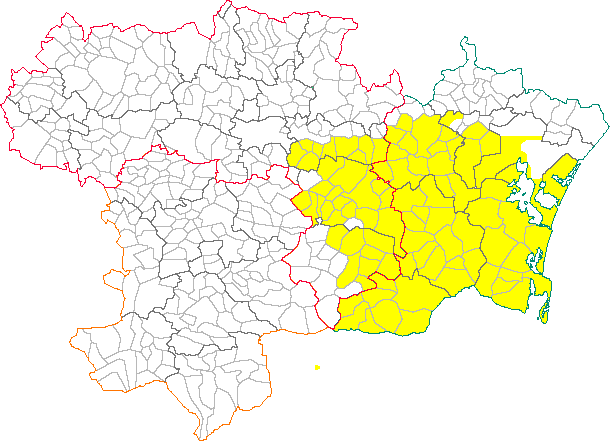
Map of Aude, with the Corbières AOC producing area in yellow.

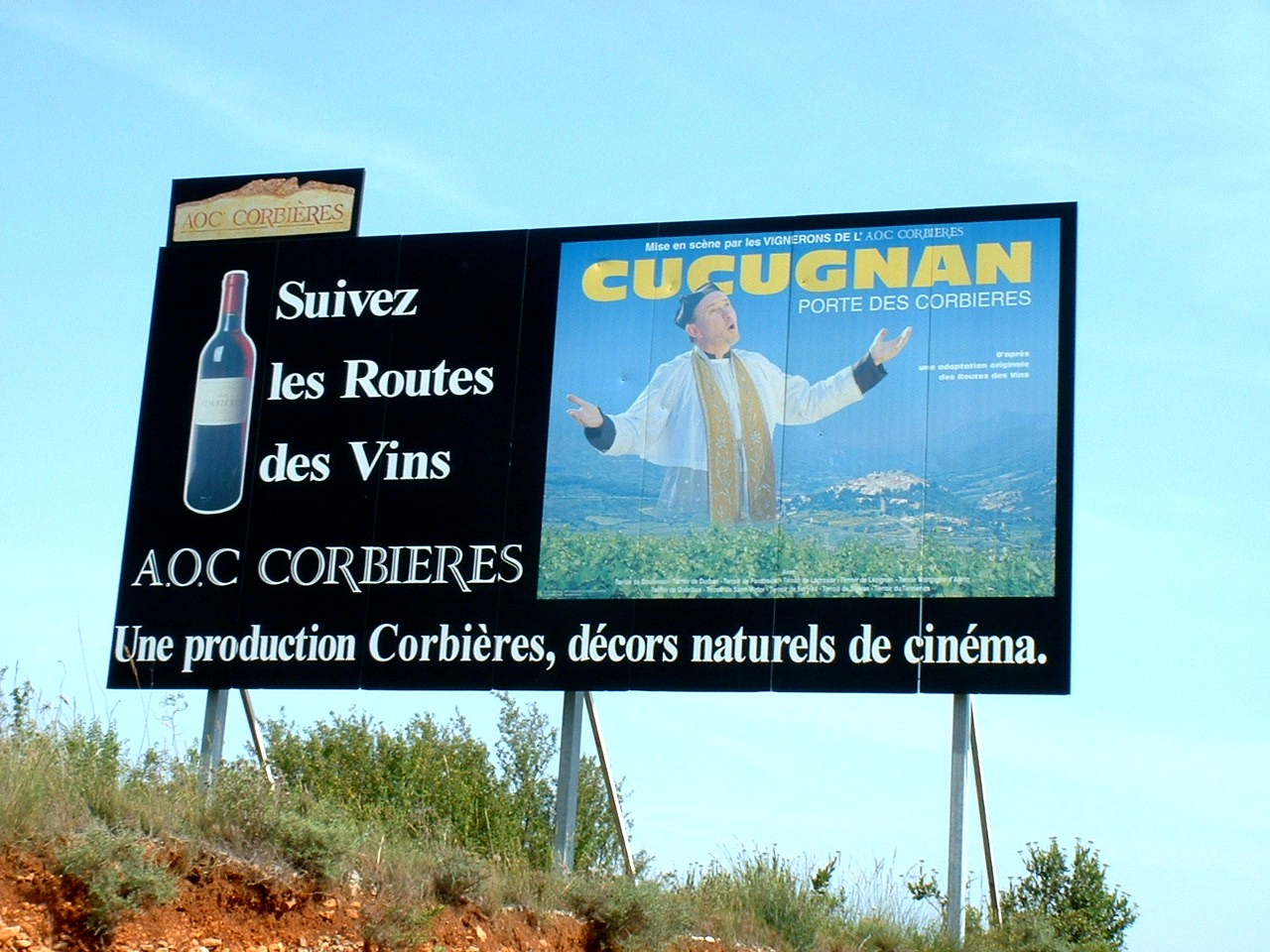
Humoristic sign along a road in the Corbières AOC area

Corbières (French pronunciation: [kɔʁbjɛʁ]) is an Appellation d'origine contrôlée (AOC) for wine in the Languedoc-Roussillon, France, and it is this region's largest AOC, responsible for 46 per cent of the region's AOC wine production in 2005. Red wine dominates the production in Corbières with almost 95 per cent, with 3.5 per cent rosé wine and 2 per cent white wine making up the balance. Carignan is the most common grape variety. The AOC was created in 1985, covers 13,500 hectares (33,000 acres) of vineyards and produces an average of 554,000 hectoliters of wine per year, corresponding to 74 million bottles.

Due to its size and geography, Corbières encompasses an enormous variety of soil types and microclimates. The wines from the region tend to be just as varied as the terroir. The region also experiences widely varied winds. The dry, Atlantic vent Cers frequently brings cold weather from the northwest while the area is normally under the influence of the warm, Mediterranean vent Marin.

== Geographical division ==
The Corbières AOC consists of 11 terroirs:

1. Montagne d'Alaric
2. Saint Victor
3. Fontfroide
4. Queribus
5. Boutenac
6. Termenès
7. Lézignan
8. Lagrasse
9. Sigean
10. Durban
11. Serviès

Boutenac was elevated to its own AOC under the designation Corbières-Boutenac in 2005.

List of the communes within the AOC area:

- Arrondissement of Carcassonne
  - Canton of Capendu; the following communes:
    - Barbaira, Capendu, Comigne, Douzens, Floure, Fontiès-d'Aude, Montirat, Monze, Moux,
  - Canton de Lagrasse; the following communes:
    - Arquettes-en-Val, Caunettes-en-Val, Labastide-en-Val, Lagrasse, Mayronnes, Montlaur, Pradelles-en-Val, Ribaute, Rieux-en-Val, Saint-Pierre-des-Champs, Serviès-en-Val, Talairan, Taurize, Tournissan, Villar-en-Val and Villetritouls.
  - Canton de Mouthoumet; the following communes:
    - Davejean, Dernacueillette, Félines-Termenès, Laroque-de-Fa, Palairac, Termes, Vignevieille and Villerouge-Termenès
- Arrondissement of Narbonne
  - Canton of Narbonne-Ouest; the following communes:
    - Bizanet, Canet-d'Aude, Montredon-des-Corbières, Narbonne and Névian.
  - Canton of Narbonne-Sud; the commune of : Bages
  - Canton of Coursan; la commune de Gruissan.
  - Canton of Sigean : (the whole canton)
    - Caves, Feuilla, Fitou, La Palme, Leucate, Peyriac-de-Mer, Port-la-Nouvelle, Portel-des-Corbières, Roquefort-des-Corbières, Sigean and Treilles.
  - Canton of Tuchan: (the whole canton)
    - Cucugnan, Duilhac-sous-Peyrepertuse, Maisons, Montgaillard, Padern, Paziols, Rouffiac-des-Corbières and Tuchan
  - Canton of Durban-Corbières: (the whole canton)
    - Albas, Cascastel-des-Corbières, Coustouge, Durban-Corbières, Embres-et-Castelmaure, Fontjoncouse, Fraissé-des-Corbières, Jonquières, Quintillan, Saint-Jean-de-Barrou, Saint-Laurent-de-la-Cabrerisse, Thézan-des-Corbières, Villeneuve-les-Corbières and Villesèque-des-Corbières
  - Canton of Lézignan-Corbières; the following communes:
    - Boutenac, Camplong-d'Aude, Conilhac-Corbières, Cruscades, Escales, Fabrezan, Ferrals-les-Corbières, Fontcouverte, Lézignan-Corbières, Luc-sur-Orbieu, Montbrun-des-Corbières, Montséret, Ornaisons, Saint-André-de-Roquelongue,

== Appellation regulations ==
A large number of varieties are allowed in Corbières wine, but regulations restrict the proportions planted in the vineyards and (separately) in the wine. The authorised grape varieties are indicated below. Principal or main grape varieties for the respective colour are indicated by "X" and secondary or subsidiary varieties by "(X)".

Variety	Red wine	Rosé wine	White wine
Bourboulenc		(X)	X
Carignan	X	X	
Cinsaut	(X)	X	
Clairette		(X)	(X)
Grenache	X	X	
Grenache blanc		(X)	X
Grenache gris	(X)	(X)	
Lledoner Pelut	X	X	
Macabeu		(X)	X
Marsanne		(X)	X
Muscat Blanc à Petits Grains		(X)	(X)
Mourvèdre	X	X	
Piquepoul blanc		(X)	(X)
Piquepoul noir	(X)	X	
Roussanne		(X)	X
Syrah	X	X	
Terret blanc		(X)	(X)
Terret noir	(X)	(X)	
Vermentino		(X)	X

For red wines, a minimum of two grape varieties must be grown. Grenache, Lledoner Pelut, Mourvèdre and Syrah (the main grape varieties with the exception of Carignan) must together make up at least 50 per cent of the vineyard plantings. Carignan, Picquepoul noir, and Terret noir can together not make up more than 50 per cent of the plantings. A maximum of 20 per cent Cinsaut and a maximum of 10 per cent Grenache gris is allowed.

For rosé wines, a minimum of two grape varieties must be grown. Grenache, Lledoner Pelut, Mourvèdre, Picquepoul noir and Syrah must together make up at least 25 per cent of the plantings. A maximum of 75 per cent Cinsaut is allowed. Carignan, Grenache gris and Terret noir can together not make up more than 50 per cent of the plantings. A maximum of 10 per cent Grenache gris is allowed.

For white wines at least two grape varieties must also be grown. Secondary varieties may not together make up more than 10 per cent of the plantings.

But the blend of grapes used in making the wine does not have to match the vineyard planting. For example, red wine must be made from a blend of at least two varieties, of which at least one must be a principal variety. The principal variety/ies must represent at least 40% of the blend. No single variety can make up more than 80% of the wine. The requirements are the same for rosé wine. In the case of white wine there must be at least two varieties, with the principal variety/ies making up at least 40% of the blend, but there is no maximum percentage for a single variety.

== See also ==
- List of appellations in Languedoc-Roussillon
- List of Vins de Primeur
