= Taurize =

Commune in Occitanie, France

- Commune
- Coat of arms
- Location of Taurize
- Location within France Location within Occitanie
- Coordinates: 43°04′39″N 2°30′20″E
- Country: France
- Region: Occitania
- Department: Aude
- Arrondissement: Carcassonne
- Canton: La Montagne d'Alaric
- Intercommunality: Carcassonne Agglo

Government
  - Mayor (2020–2026): Jacques Perallon
- Area^{1}: 8.34 km^{2} (3.22 sq mi)
- Elevation: 205 m (673 ft)
- Highest elevation: 665 m (2,182 ft)
- Lowest elevation: 197 m (646 ft)
- Population (2023): 108
  - Density: 12.9/km^{2} (33.5/sq mi)
- Time zone: UTC+01:00 (CET)
  - Summer (DST): UTC+02:00 (CEST)
- INSEE/Postal code: 11387 /11220
- ^{1} French Land Register data, which excludes lakes, ponds, glaciers > 1 km^{2} (0.386 sq mi or 247 acres) and river estuaries.

Taurize (French pronunciation: [toʁiz]; Occitan: Taurisa) is a commune in the Aude department in southern France.

== Population ==
Historical population
Year	Pop.	±% p.a.
1968	55	—
1975	63	+1.96%
1982	62	−0.23%
1990	56	−1.26%
1999	64	+1.49%
2007	67	+0.57%
2012	84	+4.63%
2017	113	+6.11%
2023	108	−0.75%
Source: INSEE

== See also ==
- Corbières AOC
- Communes of the Aude department
