= Bouilhonnac =

Commune in Occitanie, France

- Commune
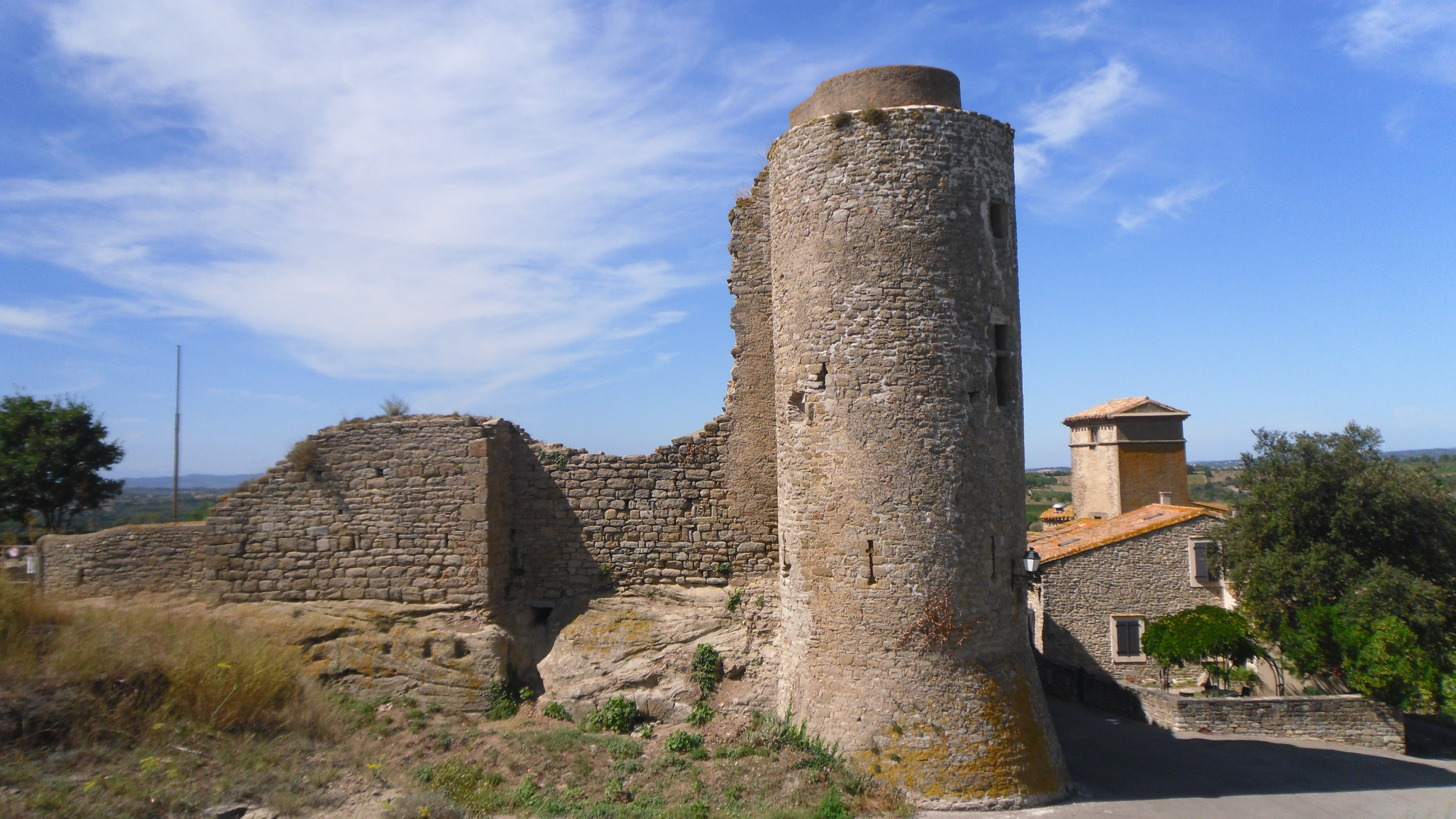
- Ruins of the chateau

- Coat of arms
- Location of Bouilhonnac
- Location within France Location within Occitanie
- Coordinates: 43°13′55″N 2°26′26″E
- Country: France
- Region: Occitania
- Department: Aude
- Arrondissement: Carcassonne
- Canton: La Montagne d'Alaric
- Intercommunality: Carcassonne Agglo

Government
  - Mayor (2020–2026): Dorothée Pechaire
- Area^{1}: 5.71 km^{2} (2.20 sq mi)
- Elevation: 160 m (520 ft)
- Highest elevation: 160 m (520 ft)
- Lowest elevation: 80 m (260 ft)
- Population (2023): 226
  - Density: 39.6/km^{2} (103/sq mi)
- Time zone: UTC+01:00 (CET)
  - Summer (DST): UTC+02:00 (CEST)
- INSEE/Postal code: 11043 /11800
- ^{1} French Land Register data, which excludes lakes, ponds, glaciers > 1 km^{2} (0.386 sq mi or 247 acres) and river estuaries.

Bouilhonnac (French pronunciation: [bujɔnak]; Occitan: Bolhonac) is a commune in the Aude department in southern France.

== Population ==
Historical population
Year	Pop.	±% p.a.
1968	167	—
1975	132	−3.30%
1982	140	+0.84%
1990	181	+3.26%
1999	215	+1.93%
2007	226	+0.63%
2012	233	+0.61%
2017	227	−0.52%
2023	226	−0.07%
Source: INSEE

== See also ==
- Communes of the Aude department
