= Monze, Aude =

Commune in Occitanie, France

Monze
- Commune
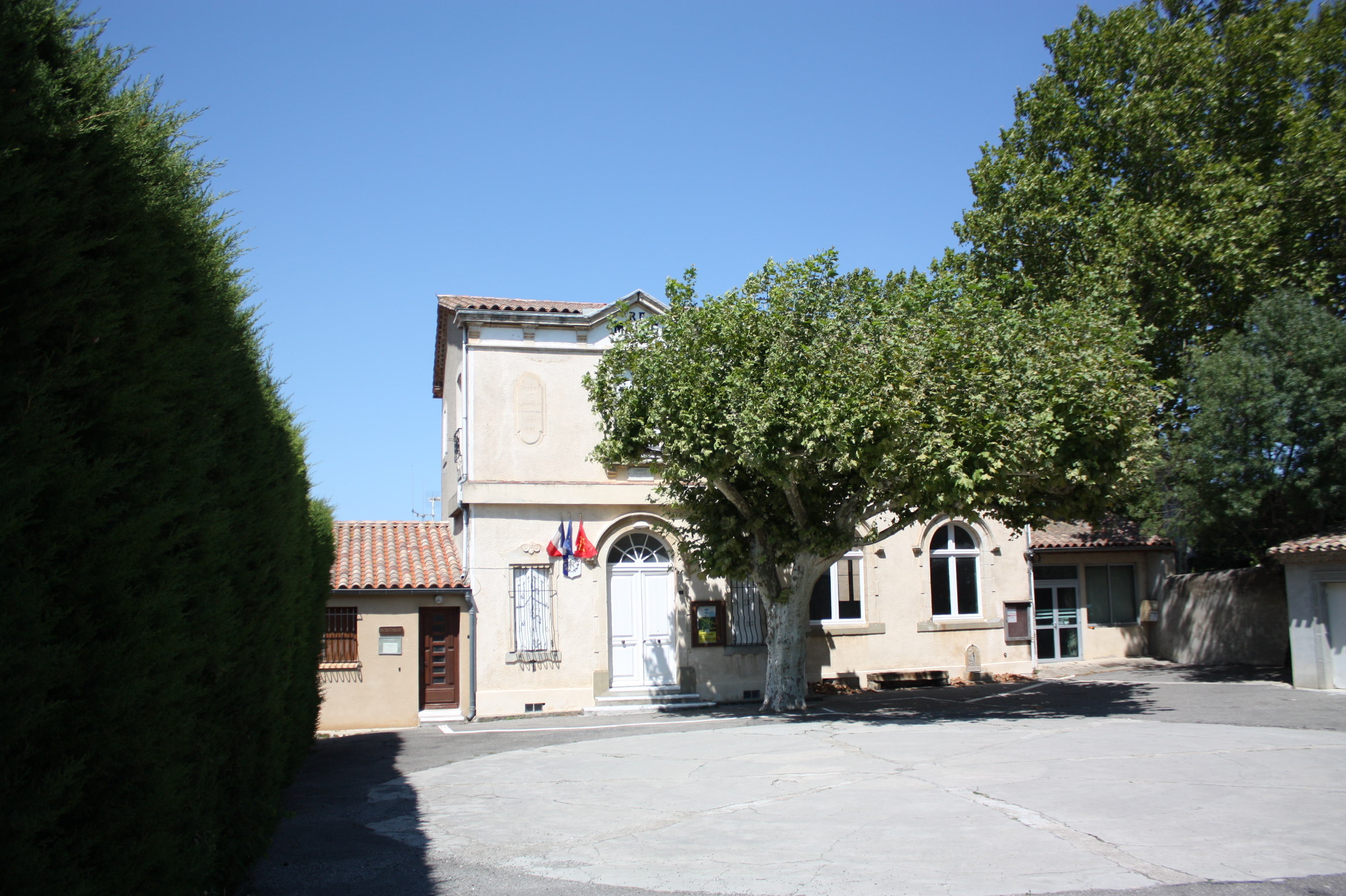
- The town hall in Monze

- Coat of arms
- Location of Monze
- Location within France Location within Occitanie
- Coordinates: 43°09′24″N 2°27′38″E
- Country: France
- Region: Occitania
- Department: Aude
- Arrondissement: Carcassonne
- Canton: La Montagne d'Alaric
- Intercommunality: Carcassonne Agglo

Government
  - Mayor (2020–2026): Christian Caverivière
- Area^{1}: 13.96 km^{2} (5.39 sq mi)
- Elevation: 157 m (515 ft)
- Highest elevation: 487 m (1,598 ft)
- Lowest elevation: 103 m (338 ft)
- Population (2023): 243
  - Density: 17.4/km^{2} (45.1/sq mi)
- Time zone: UTC+01:00 (CET)
  - Summer (DST): UTC+02:00 (CEST)
- INSEE/Postal code: 11257 /11800
- ^{1} French Land Register data, which excludes lakes, ponds, glaciers > 1 km^{2} (0.386 sq mi or 247 acres) and river estuaries.

Monze (French pronunciation: [mɔ̃z]; Occitan: Monza) is a commune in the Aude department in southern France.

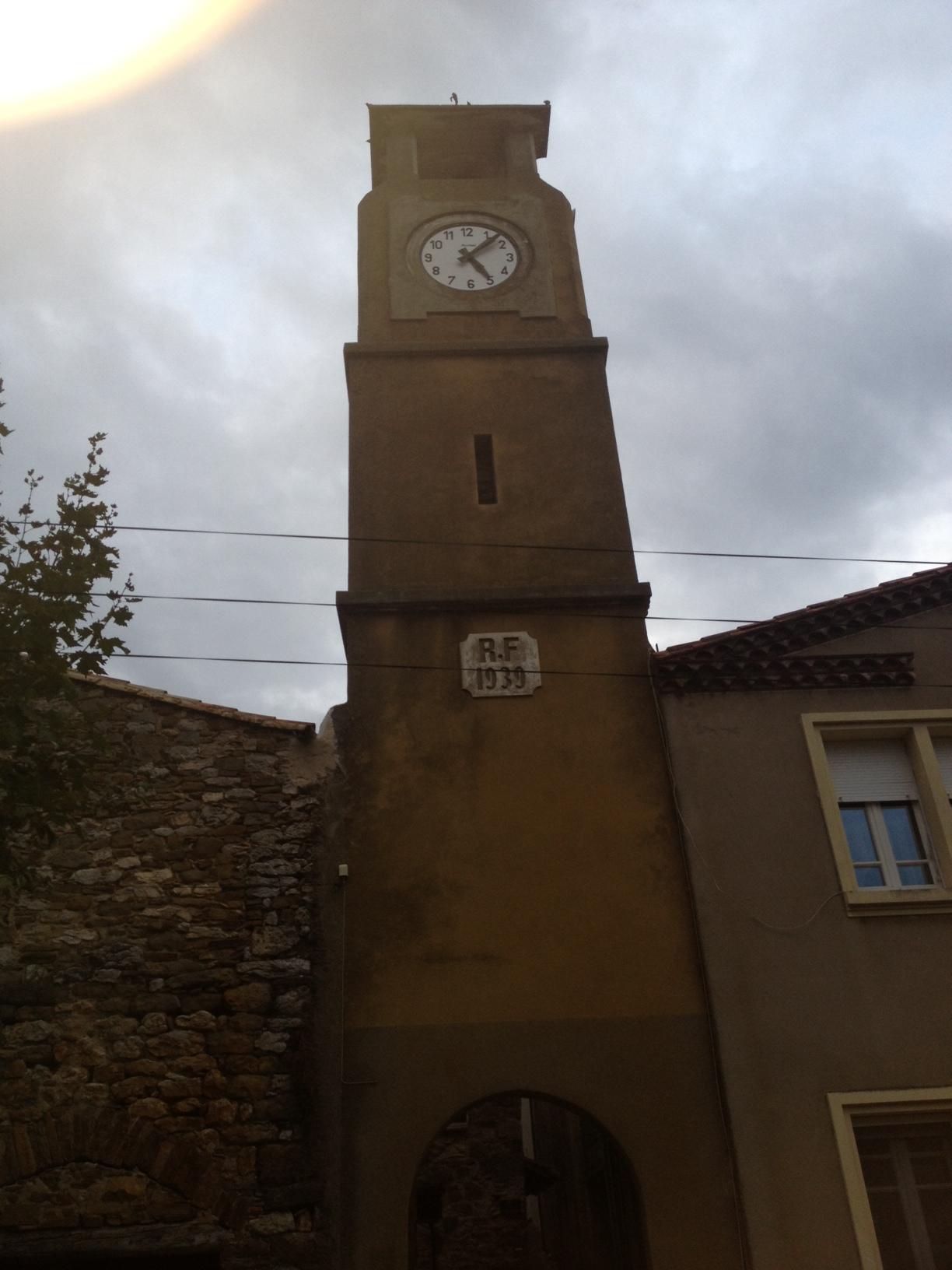

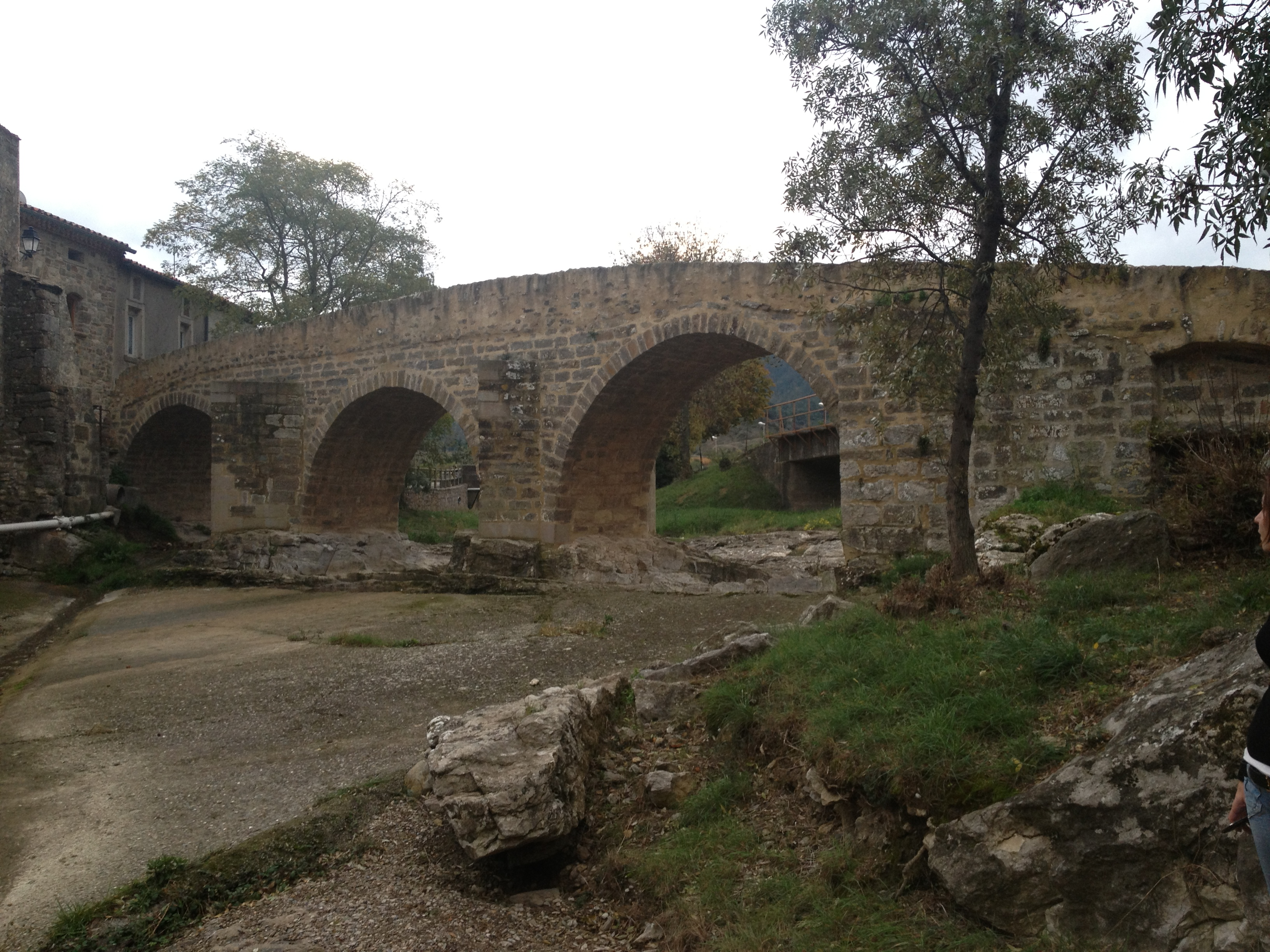

== Population ==
Historical population
Year	Pop.	±% p.a.
1968	162	—
1975	153	−0.81%
1982	144	−0.86%
1990	166	+1.79%
1999	193	+1.69%
2007	179	−0.94%
2012	205	+2.75%
2017	227	+2.06%
2023	243	+1.14%
Source: INSEE

== See also ==
- Corbières AOC
- Communes of the Aude department
