= Berriac =

Commune in Occitanie, France

- Commune
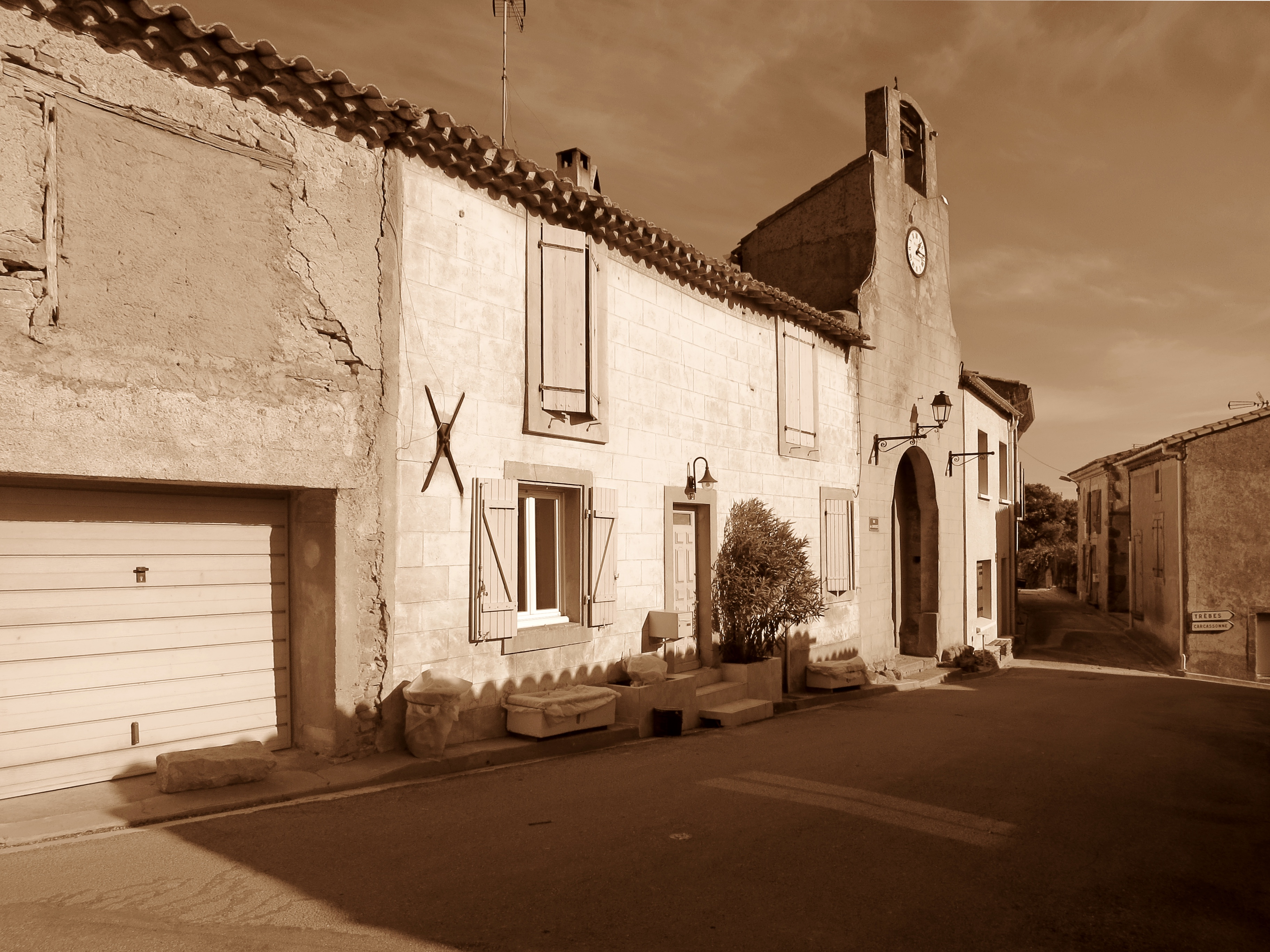
- Street of the Quarries

- Coat of arms
- Location of Berriac
- Location within France Location within Occitanie
- Coordinates: 43°13′03″N 2°24′51″E
- Country: France
- Region: Occitania
- Department: Aude
- Arrondissement: Carcassonne
- Canton: La Montagne d'Alaric
- Intercommunality: Carcassonne Agglo

Government
  - Mayor (2020–2026): Michel Soules
- Area^{1}: 2.67 km^{2} (1.03 sq mi)
- Elevation: 105 m (344 ft)
- Highest elevation: 144 m (472 ft)
- Lowest elevation: 80 m (260 ft)
- Population (2023): 979
  - Density: 367/km^{2} (950/sq mi)
- Time zone: UTC+01:00 (CET)
  - Summer (DST): UTC+02:00 (CEST)
- INSEE/Postal code: 11037 /11000
- ^{1} French Land Register data, which excludes lakes, ponds, glaciers > 1 km^{2} (0.386 sq mi or 247 acres) and river estuaries.

Berriac (French pronunciation: [bɛʁjak]) is a commune in the Aude department in southern France.

== Population ==
Historical population
Year	Pop.	±% p.a.
1968	118	—
1975	314	+15.01%
1982	390	+3.14%
1990	527	+3.83%
1999	625	+1.91%
2007	831	+3.63%
2012	880	+1.15%
2017	954	+1.63%
2023	979	+0.43%
Source: INSEE

== See also ==
- Communes of the Aude department
