= Rieux-en-Val =

Commune in Occitanie, France

- Commune
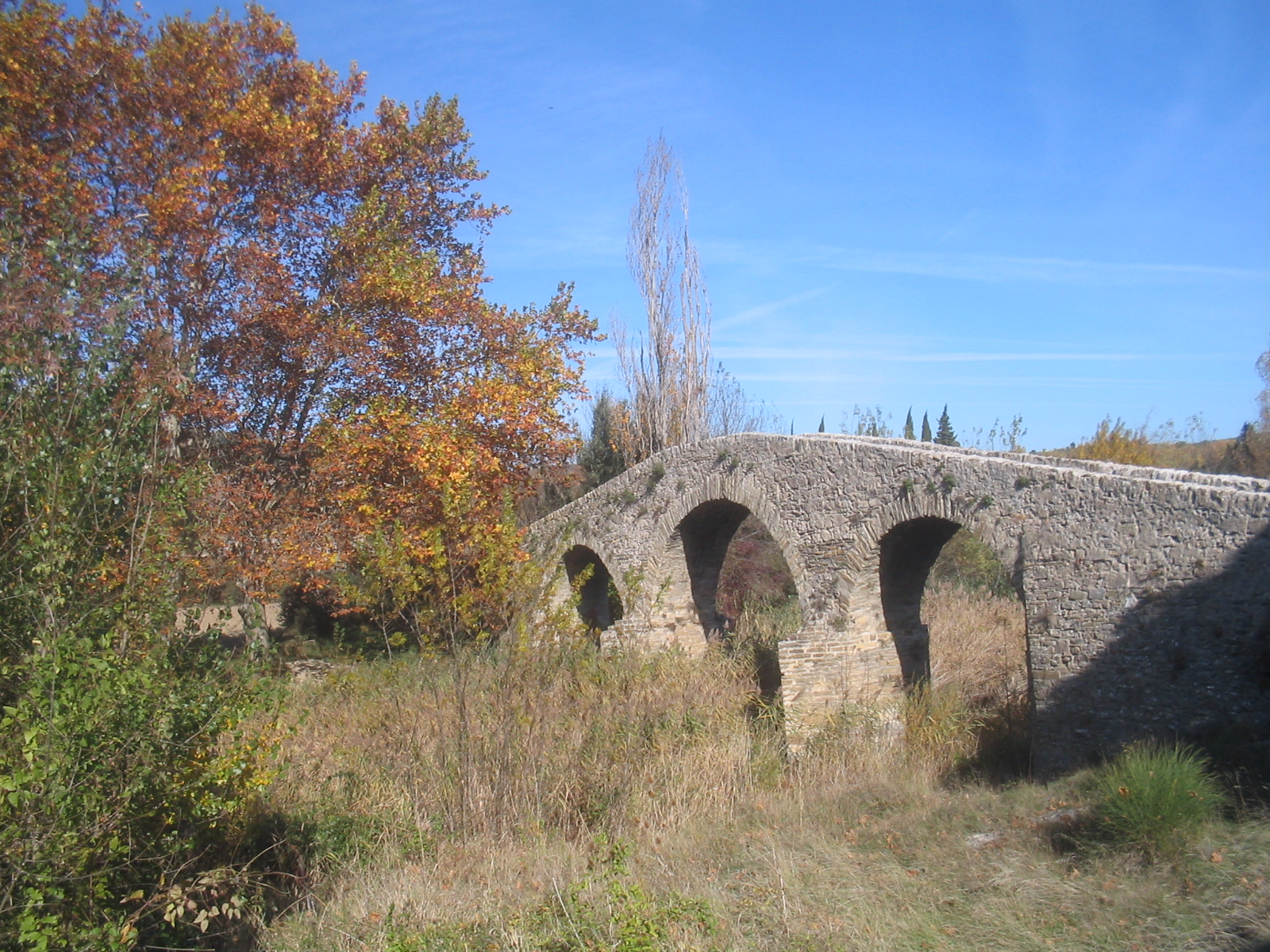
- Pont de l'âne

- Coat of arms
- Location of Rieux-en-Val
- Location within France Location within Occitanie
- Coordinates: 43°04′56″N 2°31′54″E
- Country: France
- Region: Occitania
- Department: Aude
- Arrondissement: Carcassonne
- Canton: La Montagne d'Alaric
- Intercommunality: Carcassonne Agglo

Government
  - Mayor (2020–2026): Xavier Bédos
- Area^{1}: 6.9 km^{2} (2.7 sq mi)
- Elevation: 175 m (574 ft)
- Highest elevation: 449 m (1,473 ft)
- Lowest elevation: 165 m (541 ft)
- Population (2023): 84
  - Density: 12/km^{2} (32/sq mi)
- Time zone: UTC+01:00 (CET)
  - Summer (DST): UTC+02:00 (CEST)
- INSEE/Postal code: 11314 /11220
- ^{1} French Land Register data, which excludes lakes, ponds, glaciers > 1 km^{2} (0.386 sq mi or 247 acres) and river estuaries.

Rieux-en-Val (French pronunciation: [ʁjø ɑ̃ val]; Occitan: Rius en Val) is a commune in the Aude department in southern France. It is located approximately halfway between Carcasonne and Perpignan.

== Population ==
Historical population
Year	Pop.	±% p.a.
1968	105	—
1975	99	−0.84%
1982	86	−1.99%
1990	82	−0.59%
1999	84	+0.27%
2007	77	−1.08%
2012	87	+2.47%
2017	88	+0.23%
2023	84	−0.77%
Source: INSEE

== See also ==
- Corbières AOC
- Communes of the Aude department
