= Labastide-en-Val =

Commune in Occitanie, France

- Commune
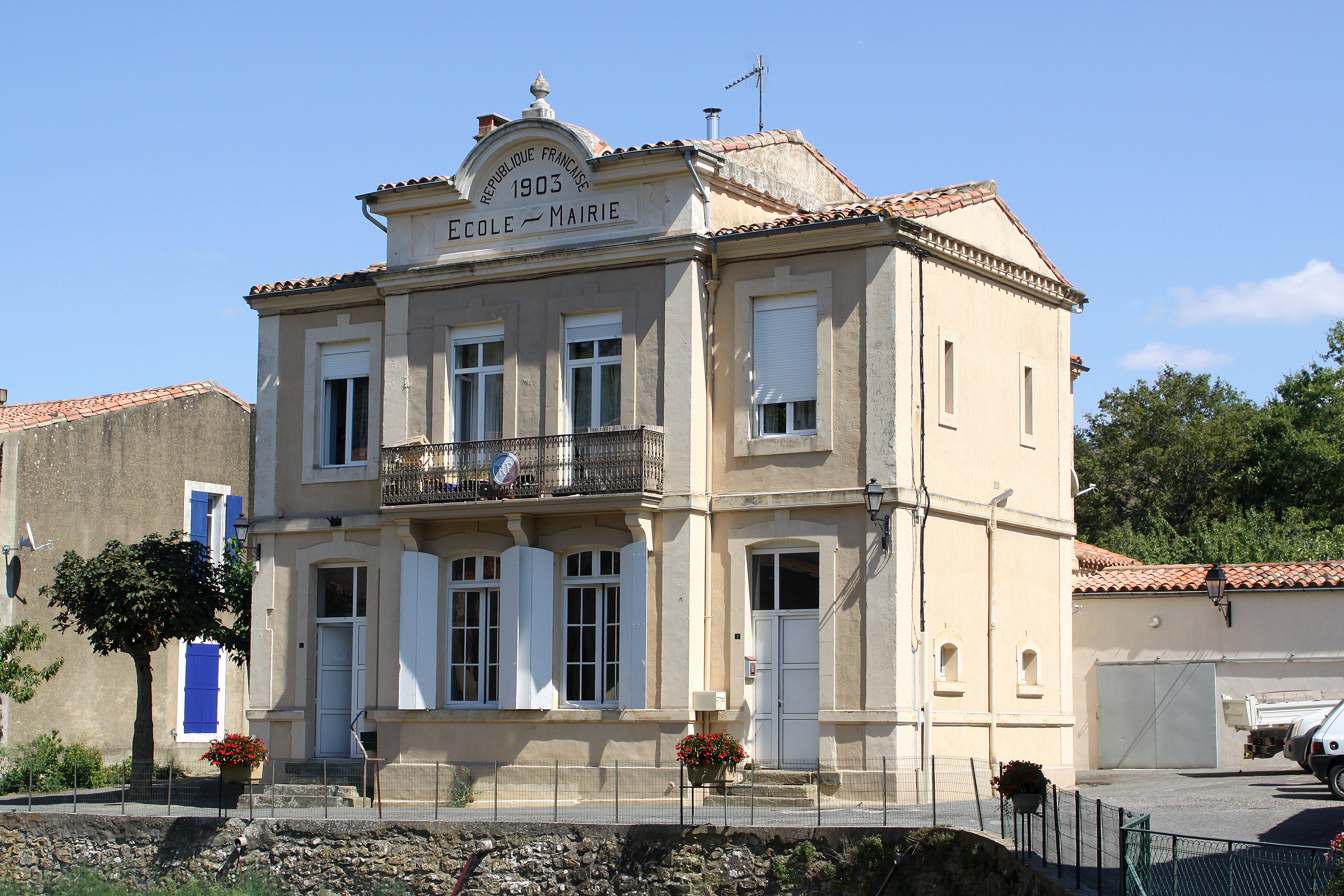
- The town hall in Labastide-en-Val

- Coat of arms
- Location of Labastide-en-Val
- Location within France Location within Occitanie
- Coordinates: 43°04′36″N 2°28′28″E
- Country: France
- Region: Occitania
- Department: Aude
- Arrondissement: Carcassonne
- Canton: La Montagne d'Alaric
- Intercommunality: Carcassonne Agglo

Government
  - Mayor (2020–2026): Fernand Delgado
- Area^{1}: 11.7 km^{2} (4.5 sq mi)
- Elevation: 220 m (720 ft)
- Highest elevation: 728 m (2,388 ft)
- Lowest elevation: 218 m (715 ft)
- Population (2023): 88
  - Density: 7.5/km^{2} (19/sq mi)
- Time zone: UTC+01:00 (CET)
  - Summer (DST): UTC+02:00 (CEST)
- INSEE/Postal code: 11179 /11220
- ^{1} French Land Register data, which excludes lakes, ponds, glaciers > 1 km^{2} (0.386 sq mi or 247 acres) and river estuaries.

Labastide-en-Val (French pronunciation: [labastid ɑ̃ val]; Occitan: La Bastida en Val) is a commune in the Aude department in southern France.

== Population ==
Historical population
Year	Pop.	±% p.a.
1968	106	—
1975	90	−2.31%
1982	76	−2.39%
1990	58	−3.32%
1999	75	+2.90%
2007	65	−1.77%
2012	100	+9.00%
2017	92	−1.65%
2023	88	−0.74%
Source: INSEE

== See also ==
- Corbières AOC
- Communes of the Aude department
