= Comigne =

Commune in Occitanie, France

- Commune
- Coat of arms
- Location of Comigne
- Location within France Location within Occitanie
- Coordinates: 43°10′17″N 2°34′56″E
- Country: France
- Region: Occitania
- Department: Aude
- Arrondissement: Carcassonne
- Canton: La Montagne d'Alaric
- Intercommunality: Carcassonne Agglo

Government
  - Mayor (2020–2026): Fabrice Dhomps
- Area^{1}: 9.24 km^{2} (3.57 sq mi)
- Elevation: 180 m (590 ft)
- Highest elevation: 548 m (1,798 ft)
- Lowest elevation: 80 m (260 ft)
- Population (2023): 328
  - Density: 35.5/km^{2} (91.9/sq mi)
- Time zone: UTC+01:00 (CET)
  - Summer (DST): UTC+02:00 (CEST)
- INSEE/Postal code: 11095 /11700
- ^{1} French Land Register data, which excludes lakes, ponds, glaciers > 1 km^{2} (0.386 sq mi or 247 acres) and river estuaries.

Comigne (French pronunciation: [kɔmiɲ]; Occitan: Cominha) is a commune in the Aude département in southern France.

== Population ==
Historical population
Year	Pop.	±% p.a.
1968	213	—
1975	188	−1.77%
1982	180	−0.62%
1990	199	+1.26%
1999	179	−1.17%
2007	230	+3.18%
2012	293	+4.96%
2017	305	+0.81%
2023	328	+1.22%
Source: INSEE

== See also ==
- Corbières AOC
- Communes of the Aude department
