= Fontiès-d'Aude =

Commune in Occitanie, France

- Commune
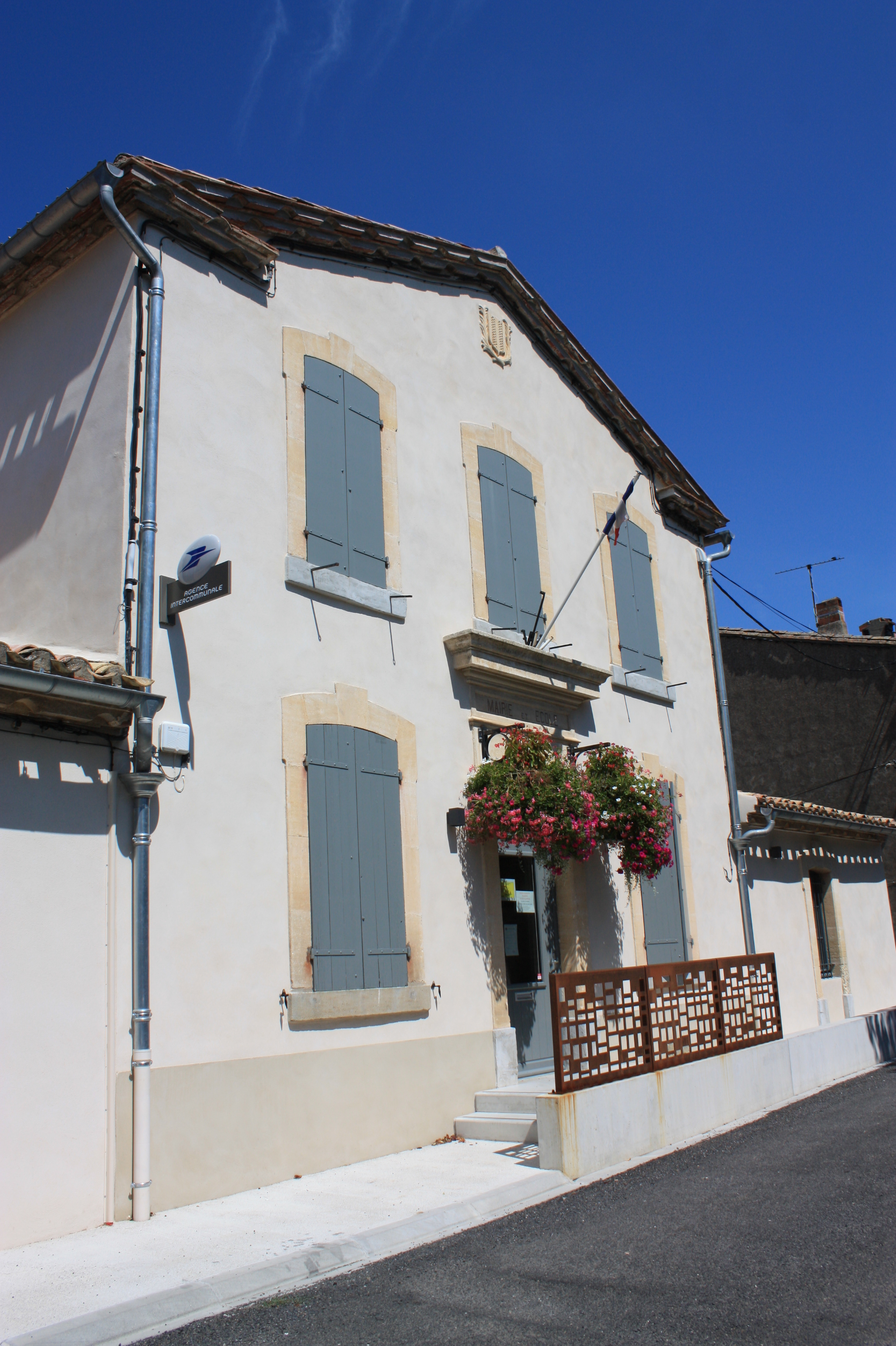
- The town hall in Fontiès-d'Aude

- Coat of arms
- Location of Fontiès-d'Aude
- Location within France Location within Occitanie
- Coordinates: 43°11′16″N 2°27′17″E
- Country: France
- Region: Occitania
- Department: Aude
- Arrondissement: Carcassonne
- Canton: La Montagne d'Alaric
- Intercommunality: Carcassonne Agglo

Government
  - Mayor (2020–2026): Alain Garino
- Area^{1}: 6.07 km^{2} (2.34 sq mi)
- Elevation: 70 m (230 ft)
- Highest elevation: 195 m (640 ft)
- Lowest elevation: 74 m (243 ft)
- Population (2023): 560
  - Density: 92/km^{2} (240/sq mi)
- Time zone: UTC+01:00 (CET)
  - Summer (DST): UTC+02:00 (CEST)
- INSEE/Postal code: 11151 /11800
- ^{1} French Land Register data, which excludes lakes, ponds, glaciers > 1 km^{2} (0.386 sq mi or 247 acres) and river estuaries.

Fontiès-d'Aude (French pronunciation: [fɔ̃tjɛs dod]; Occitan: Fontièrs d'Aude) is a commune in the Aude department in southern France.

== Population ==
Historical population
Year	Pop.	±% p.a.
1968	311	—
1975	239	−3.69%
1982	281	+2.34%
1990	336	+2.26%
1999	367	+0.99%
2007	400	+1.08%
2012	417	+0.84%
2017	481	+2.90%
2023	560	+2.57%
Source: INSEE

== See also ==
- Corbières AOC
- Communes of the Aude department
