= Villefloure =

Commune in Occitanie, France

- Commune
- Coat of arms
- Location of Villefloure
- Location within France Location within Occitanie
- Coordinates: 43°07′28″N 2°22′54″E
- Country: France
- Region: Occitania
- Department: Aude
- Arrondissement: Carcassonne
- Canton: Carcassonne-2
- Intercommunality: Carcassonne Agglo

Government
  - Mayor (2020–2026): Jean-Louis Aribaud
- Area^{1}: 16.69 km^{2} (6.44 sq mi)
- Elevation: 223 m (732 ft)
- Highest elevation: 487 m (1,598 ft)
- Lowest elevation: 198 m (650 ft)
- Population (2023): 156
  - Density: 9.35/km^{2} (24.2/sq mi)
- Time zone: UTC+01:00 (CET)
  - Summer (DST): UTC+02:00 (CEST)
- INSEE/Postal code: 11423 /11570
- ^{1} French Land Register data, which excludes lakes, ponds, glaciers > 1 km^{2} (0.386 sq mi or 247 acres) and river estuaries.

Villefloure (French pronunciation: [vil.fluʁ]; Occitan: Vilaflora) is a commune in the Aude department in southern France.

== Population ==
Historical population
Year	Pop.	±% p.a.
1968	75	—
1975	57	−3.84%
1982	62	+1.21%
1990	82	+3.56%
1999	76	−0.84%
2007	126	+6.52%
2012	157	+4.50%
2017	165	+1.00%
2023	156	−0.93%
Source: INSEE

== See also ==
- Communes of the Aude department
