= Serviès-en-Val =

Commune in Occitanie, France

- Commune
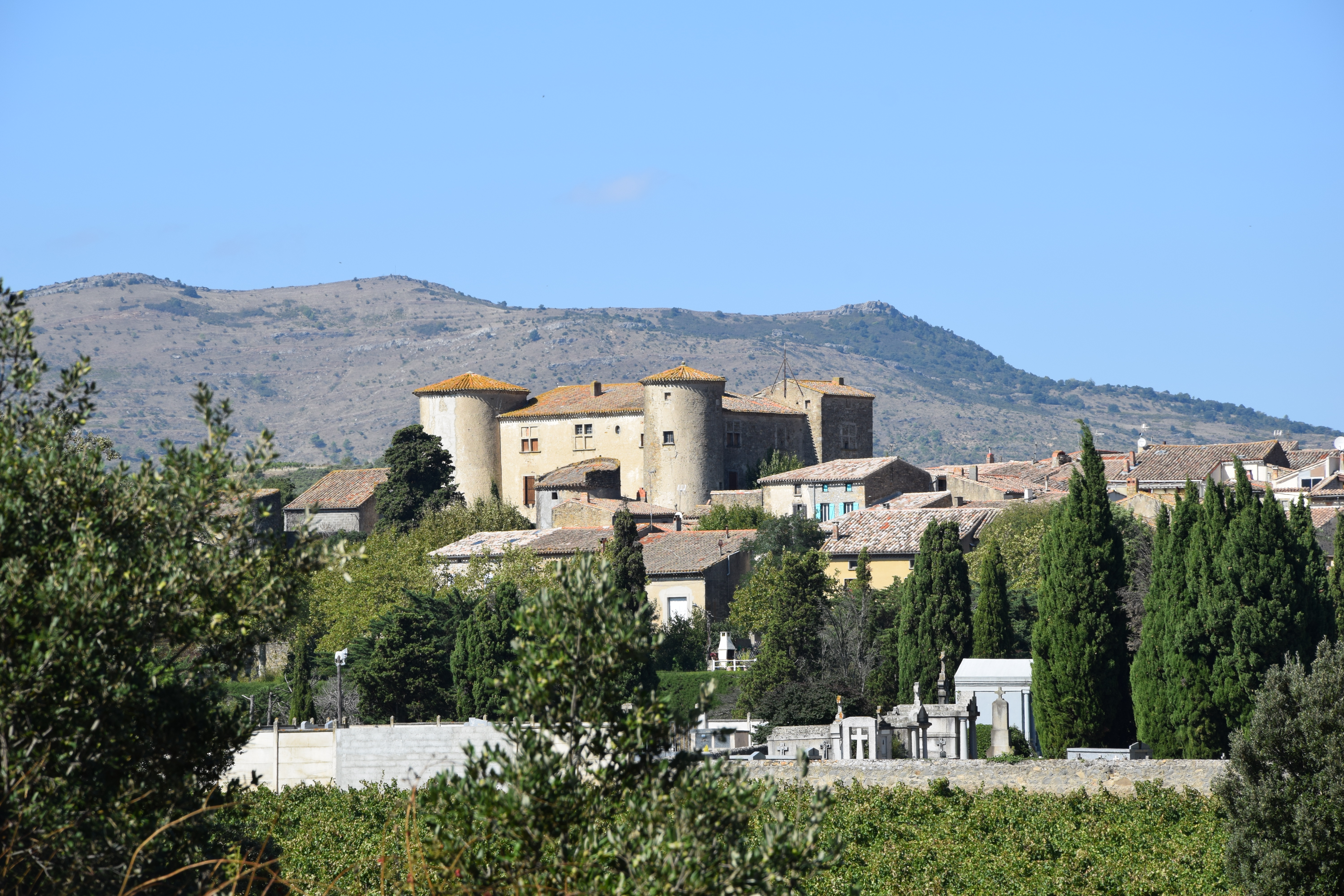
- The chateau and surroundings in Serviès-en-Val

- Coat of arms
- Location of Serviès-en-Val
- Location within France Location within Occitanie
- Coordinates: 43°05′24″N 2°31′15″E
- Country: France
- Region: Occitania
- Department: Aude
- Arrondissement: Carcassonne
- Canton: La Montagne d'Alaric
- Intercommunality: Carcassonne Agglo

Government
  - Mayor (2020–2026): Martine Escanuela
- Area^{1}: 6.5 km^{2} (2.5 sq mi)
- Elevation: 213 m (699 ft)
- Highest elevation: 323 m (1,060 ft)
- Lowest elevation: 175 m (574 ft)
- Population (2023): 221
  - Density: 34/km^{2} (88/sq mi)
- Time zone: UTC+01:00 (CET)
  - Summer (DST): UTC+02:00 (CEST)
- INSEE/Postal code: 11378 /11220
- ^{1} French Land Register data, which excludes lakes, ponds, glaciers > 1 km^{2} (0.386 sq mi or 247 acres) and river estuaries.

Serviès-en-Val (French pronunciation: [sɛʁvjɛs ɑ̃ val]) is a commune in the Aude department in southern France.

== Population ==
Historical population
Year	Pop.	±% p.a.
1968	350	—
1975	323	−1.14%
1982	270	−2.53%
1990	245	−1.21%
1999	250	+0.22%
2007	228	−1.14%
2012	224	−0.35%
2017	213	−1.00%
2023	221	+0.62%
Source: INSEE

== See also ==
- Corbières AOC
- Communes of the Aude department
