= Trassanel =

Commune in Occitanie, France

- Commune
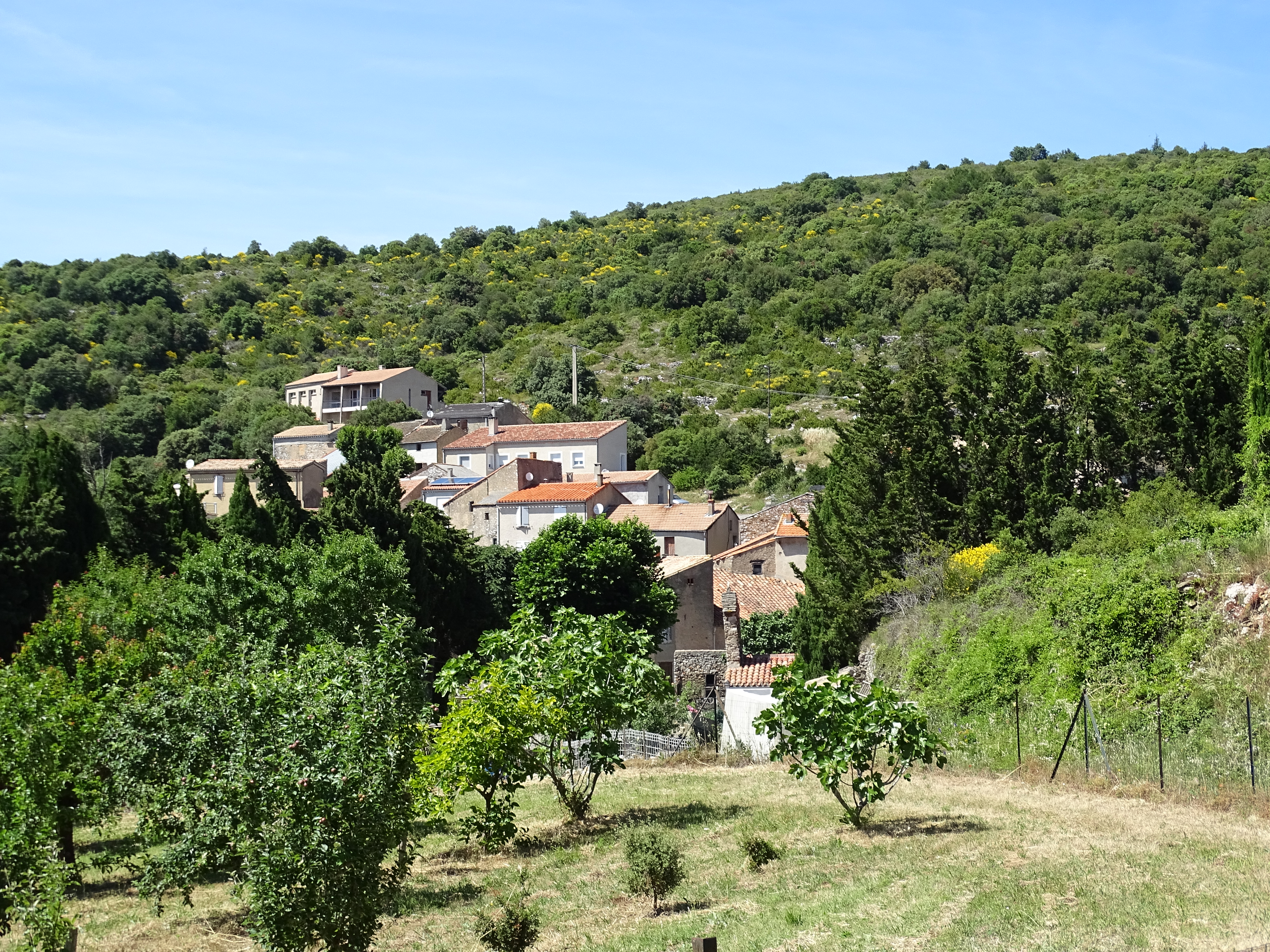
- A general view of Trassanel

- Coat of arms
- Location of Trassanel
- Location within France Location within Occitanie
- Coordinates: 43°20′50″N 2°26′14″E
- Country: France
- Region: Occitania
- Department: Aude
- Arrondissement: Carcassonne
- Canton: Le Haut-Minervois
- Intercommunality: Carcassonne Agglo

Government
  - Mayor (2020–2026): Christiane Gros
- Area^{1}: 4.34 km^{2} (1.68 sq mi)
- Elevation: 402 m (1,319 ft)
- Highest elevation: 687 m (2,254 ft)
- Lowest elevation: 270 m (890 ft)
- Population (2023): 25
  - Density: 5.8/km^{2} (15/sq mi)
- Time zone: UTC+01:00 (CET)
  - Summer (DST): UTC+02:00 (CEST)
- INSEE/Postal code: 11395 /11160
- ^{1} French Land Register data, which excludes lakes, ponds, glaciers > 1 km^{2} (0.386 sq mi or 247 acres) and river estuaries.

Trassanel (French pronunciation: [tʁasanɛl]; Occitan: Trassanèl) is a commune in the Aude département in southern France.

== Population ==
Historical population
Year	Pop.	±% p.a.
1968	41	—
1975	41	+0.00%
1982	31	−3.92%
1990	21	−4.75%
1999	20	−0.54%
2007	24	+2.31%
2012	33	+6.58%
2017	34	+0.60%
2023	25	−5.00%
Source: INSEE

== See also ==
- Communes of the Aude department
