= Villedubert =

Commune in Occitanie, France

- Commune
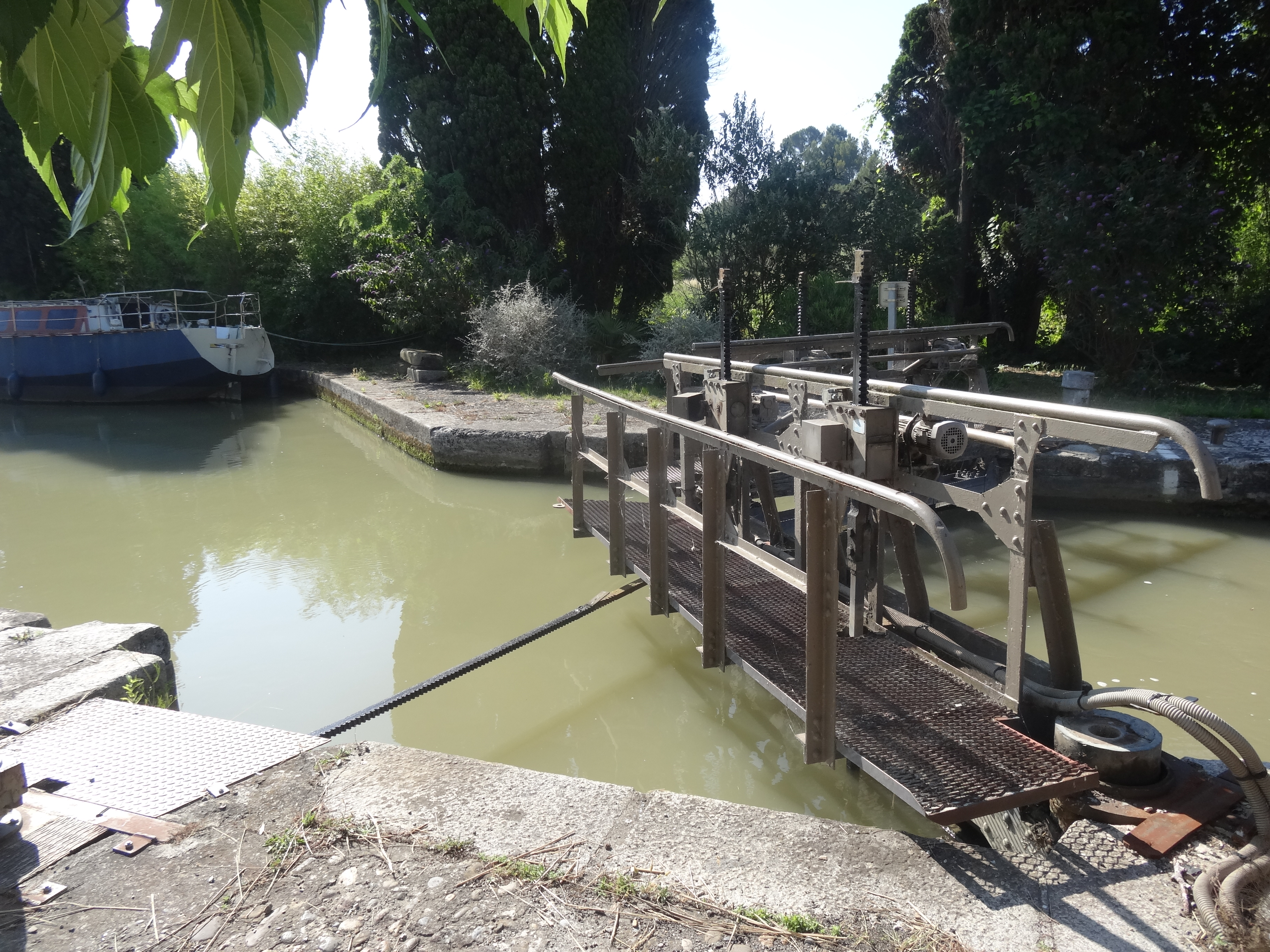
- The Villedubert lock on the Canal du Midi

- Coat of arms
- Location of Villedubert
- Location within France Location within Occitanie
- Coordinates: 43°13′55″N 2°25′19″E
- Country: France
- Region: Occitania
- Department: Aude
- Arrondissement: Carcassonne
- Canton: La Montagne d'Alaric
- Intercommunality: Carcassonne Agglo

Government
  - Mayor (2020–2026): Marc Rofes
- Area^{1}: 3.04 km^{2} (1.17 sq mi)
- Elevation: 96 m (315 ft)
- Highest elevation: 141 m (463 ft)
- Lowest elevation: 80 m (260 ft)
- Population (2023): 349
  - Density: 115/km^{2} (297/sq mi)
- Time zone: UTC+01:00 (CET)
  - Summer (DST): UTC+02:00 (CEST)
- INSEE/Postal code: 11422 /11800
- ^{1} French Land Register data, which excludes lakes, ponds, glaciers > 1 km^{2} (0.386 sq mi or 247 acres) and river estuaries.

Villedubert (French pronunciation: [vildybɛʁ]; Occitan: Viladubèrt) is a commune in the Aude department in southern France.

== Population ==
Historical population
Year	Pop.	±% p.a.
1968	180	—
1975	186	+0.47%
1982	254	+4.55%
1990	276	+1.04%
1999	285	+0.36%
2007	355	+2.78%
2012	336	−1.09%
2017	345	+0.53%
2023	349	+0.19%
Source: INSEE

== See also ==
- Communes of the Aude department
