= Montclar, Aude =

Commune in Occitanie, France

Montclar
- Commune
- Coat of arms
- Location of Montclar
- Location within France Location within Occitanie
- Coordinates: 43°08′07″N 2°14′51″E
- Country: France
- Region: Occitania
- Department: Aude
- Arrondissement: Carcassonne
- Canton: Carcassonne-3
- Intercommunality: Carcassonne Agglo

Government
  - Mayor (2020–2026): Anne Barthe-Lascorz
- Area^{1}: 11.31 km^{2} (4.37 sq mi)
- Elevation: 190 m (620 ft)
- Highest elevation: 400 m (1,300 ft)
- Lowest elevation: 162 m (531 ft)
- Population (2023): 178
  - Density: 15.7/km^{2} (40.8/sq mi)
- Time zone: UTC+01:00 (CET)
  - Summer (DST): UTC+02:00 (CEST)
- INSEE/Postal code: 11242 /11250
- ^{1} French Land Register data, which excludes lakes, ponds, glaciers > 1 km^{2} (0.386 sq mi or 247 acres) and river estuaries.

Montclar (French pronunciation: [mɔ̃klaʁ]) is a commune in the Aude department in southern France.

== See also ==
- Communes of the Aude department
