= Canton of La Montagne d'Alaric =

Coordinates: 43.21°N 2.44°E

- Canton
- Situation of the canton of La Montagne d'Alaric in the department of Aude
- Country: France
- Region: Occitania
- Department: Aude
- No. of communes: {{{nbcomm}}}
- Population (2023): 16,053
- INSEE code: 1118

The canton of La Montagne d'Alaric is an administrative division of the Aude department, southern France. It was created at the French canton reorganisation which came into effect in March 2015. Its seat is in Trèbes.

It consists of the following communes:

1. Arquettes-en-Val
2. Badens
3. Barbaira
4. Berriac
5. Blomac
6. Bouilhonnac
7. Capendu
8. Caunettes-en-Val
9. Comigne
10. Douzens
11. Fajac-en-Val
12. Floure
13. Fontiès-d'Aude
14. Labastide-en-Val
15. Marseillette
16. Mayronnes
17. Montirat
18. Monze
19. Moux
20. Rieux-en-Val
21. Roquecourbe-Minervois
22. Saint-Couat-d'Aude
23. Serviès-en-Val
24. Taurize
25. Trèbes
26. Val-de-Dagne
27. Villar-en-Val
28. Villedubert
29. Villetritouls
