= Citou =

Commune in Occitanie, France

- Commune
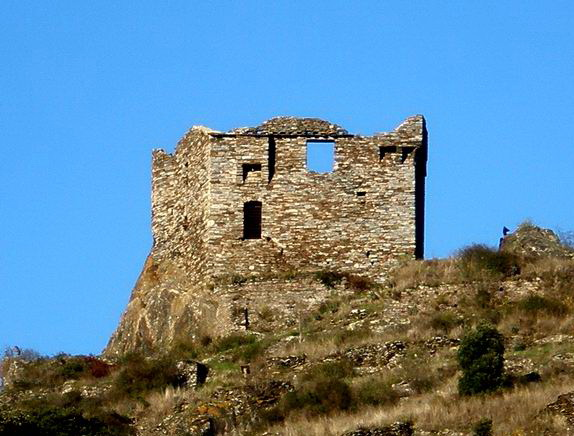
- Ruins of the chateau

- Coat of arms
- Location of Citou
- Location within France Location within Occitanie
- Coordinates: 43°22′39″N 2°32′30″E
- Country: France
- Region: Occitania
- Department: Aude
- Arrondissement: Carcassonne
- Canton: Le Haut-Minervois
- Intercommunality: Carcassonne Agglo

Government
  - Mayor (2020–2026): Émile-Raphael Busque
- Area^{1}: 17.34 km^{2} (6.70 sq mi)
- Elevation: 363 m (1,191 ft)
- Highest elevation: 929 m (3,048 ft)
- Lowest elevation: 260 m (850 ft)
- Population (2023): 101
  - Density: 5.82/km^{2} (15.1/sq mi)
- Time zone: UTC+01:00 (CET)
  - Summer (DST): UTC+02:00 (CEST)
- INSEE/Postal code: 11092 /11160
- ^{1} French Land Register data, which excludes lakes, ponds, glaciers > 1 km^{2} (0.386 sq mi or 247 acres) and river estuaries.

Citou (French pronunciation: [situ]; Occitan: Sitor) is a commune in the Aude department in southern France.

== Population ==
Historical population
Year	Pop.	±% p.a.
1968	137	—
1975	120	−1.87%
1982	110	−1.24%
1990	90	−2.48%
1999	96	+0.72%
2007	83	−1.80%
2012	80	−0.73%
2017	89	+2.16%
2023	101	+2.13%
Source: INSEE

== See also ==
- Communes of the Aude department
