= Montirat, Aude =

Commune in Occitanie, France

Montirat
- Commune
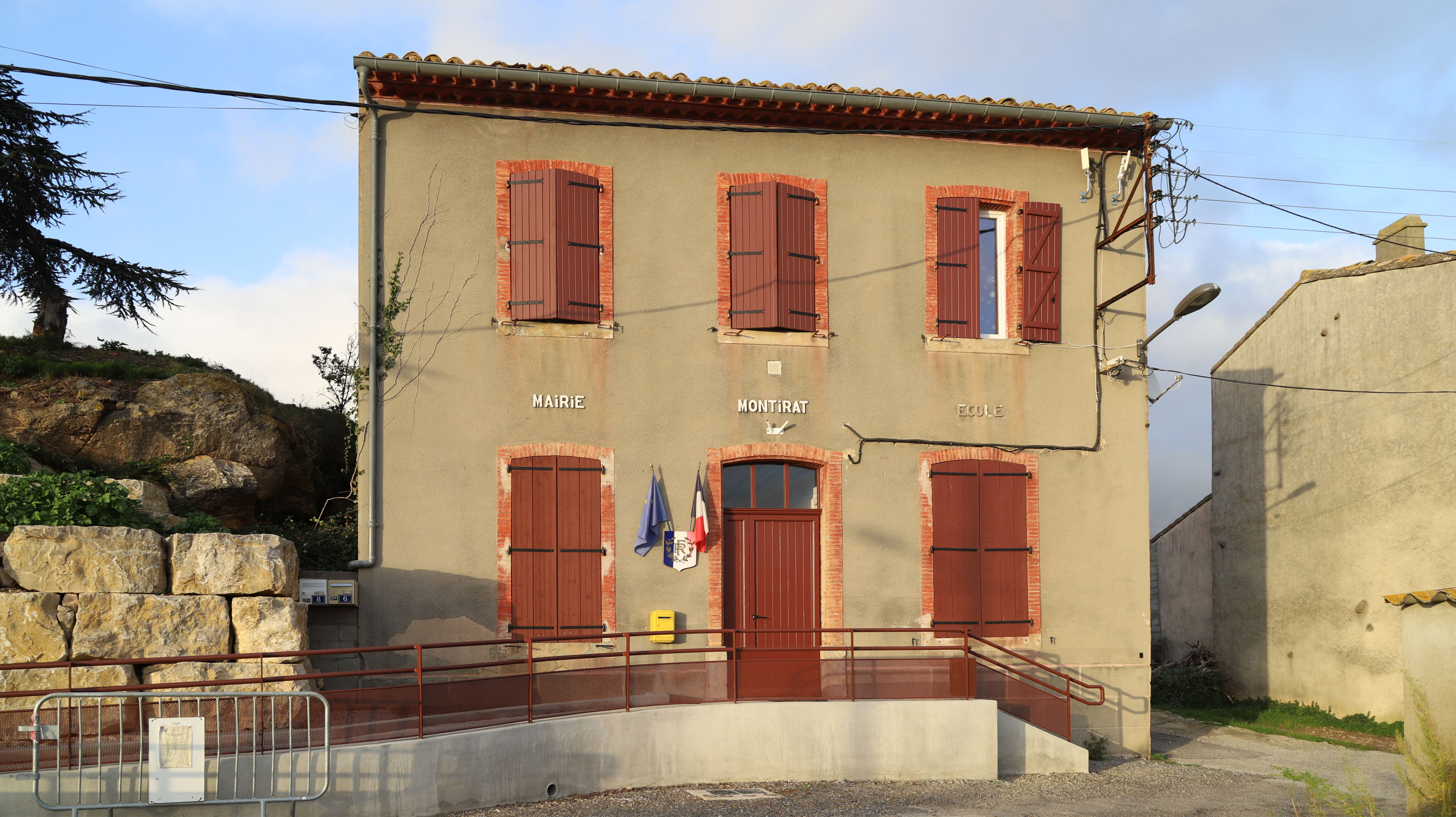
- Town hall

- Coat of arms
- Location of Montirat
- Location within France Location within Occitanie
- Coordinates: 43°10′25″N 2°26′20″E
- Country: France
- Region: Occitania
- Department: Aude
- Arrondissement: Carcassonne
- Canton: La Montagne d'Alaric
- Intercommunality: Carcassonne Agglo

Government
  - Mayor (2020–2026): Jean-Pierre Pelix
- Area^{1}: 12.67 km^{2} (4.89 sq mi)
- Elevation: 220 m (720 ft)
- Highest elevation: 440 m (1,440 ft)
- Lowest elevation: 97 m (318 ft)
- Population (2023): 70
  - Density: 5.5/km^{2} (14/sq mi)
- Time zone: UTC+01:00 (CET)
  - Summer (DST): UTC+02:00 (CEST)
- INSEE/Postal code: 11248 /11800
- ^{1} French Land Register data, which excludes lakes, ponds, glaciers > 1 km^{2} (0.386 sq mi or 247 acres) and river estuaries.

Montirat (French pronunciation: [mɔ̃tiʁa]) is a commune in the Aude department in southern France.

== Population ==
Historical population
Year	Pop.	±% p.a.
1968	88	—
1975	77	−1.89%
1982	41	−8.61%
1990	49	+2.25%
1999	60	+2.28%
2007	68	+1.58%
2012	70	+0.58%
2017	74	+1.12%
2023	70	−0.92%
Source: INSEE

== See also ==
- Corbières AOC
- Communes of the Aude department
