= Saint-Couat-d'Aude =

Commune in Occitanie, France

- Commune
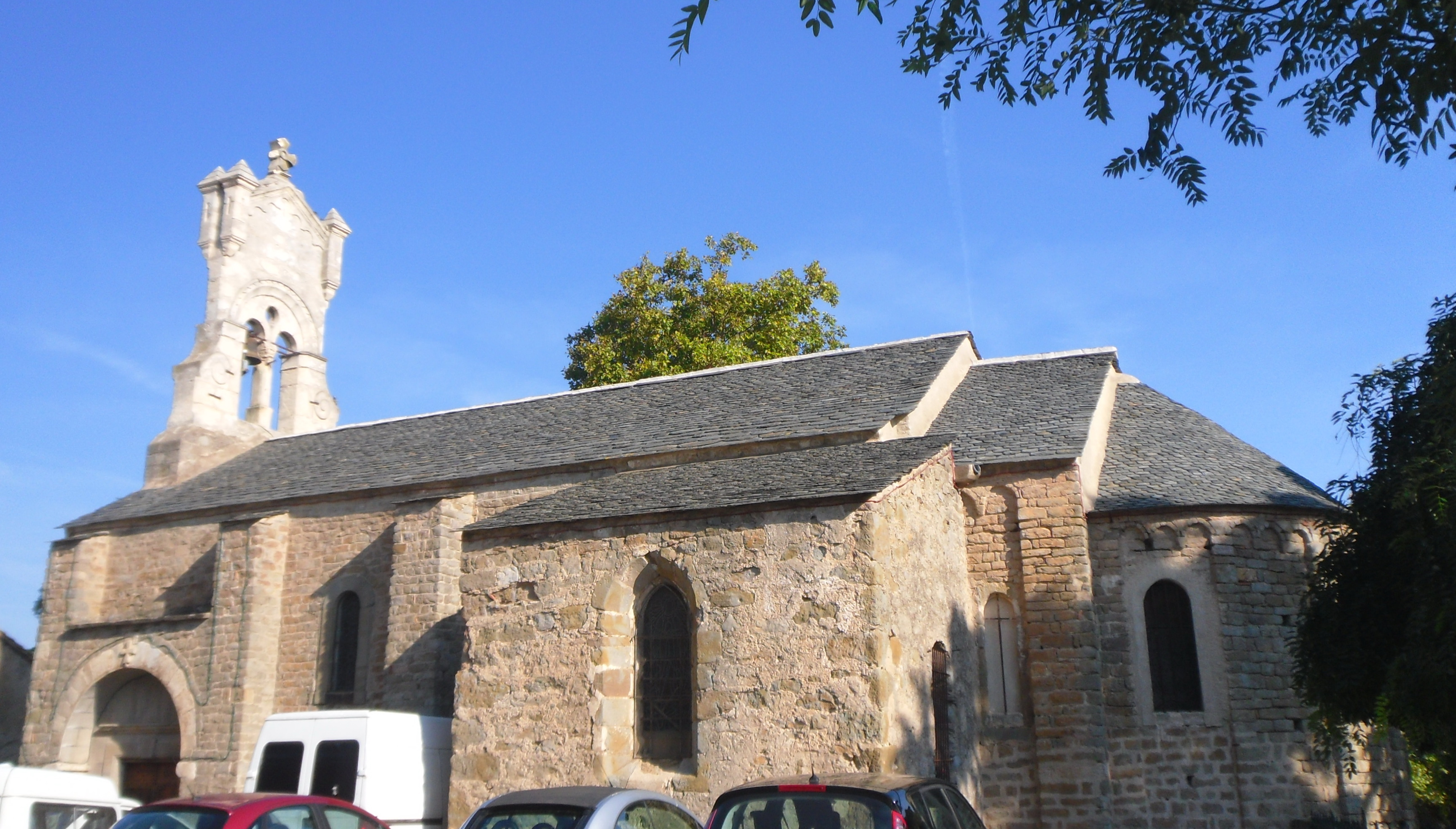
- The church in Saint-Couat-d'Aude

- Coat of arms
- Location of Saint-Couat-d'Aude
- Location within France Location within Occitanie
- Coordinates: 43°12′13″N 2°37′48″E
- Country: France
- Region: Occitania
- Department: Aude
- Arrondissement: Narbonne
- Canton: La Montagne d'Alaric

Government
  - Mayor (2020–2026): David Elis
- Area^{1}: 5.32 km^{2} (2.05 sq mi)
- Elevation: 75 m (246 ft)
- Highest elevation: 96 m (315 ft)
- Lowest elevation: 48 m (157 ft)
- Population (2023): 387
  - Density: 72.7/km^{2} (188/sq mi)
- Time zone: UTC+01:00 (CET)
  - Summer (DST): UTC+02:00 (CEST)
- INSEE/Postal code: 11337 /11700
- ^{1} French Land Register data, which excludes lakes, ponds, glaciers > 1 km^{2} (0.386 sq mi or 247 acres) and river estuaries.

Saint-Couat-d'Aude (French pronunciation: [sɛ̃ kwa dod]; Occitan: Sant Coat d'Aude) is a commune in the Aude department in southern France.

== Population ==
Historical population
| Year | Pop. | ±% p.a. |
|---|---|---|
| 1968 | 350 | — |
| 1975 | 287 | −2.80% |
| 1982 | 286 | −0.05% |
| 1990 | 286 | +0.00% |
| 1999 | 339 | +1.91% |
| 2007 | 356 | +0.61% |
| 2012 | 407 | +2.71% |
| 2017 | 404 | −0.15% |
| 2023 | 387 | −0.71% |
Source: INSEE

== See also ==
- Communes of the Aude department
