= Sallèles-Cabardès =

Commune in Occitanie, France

- Commune
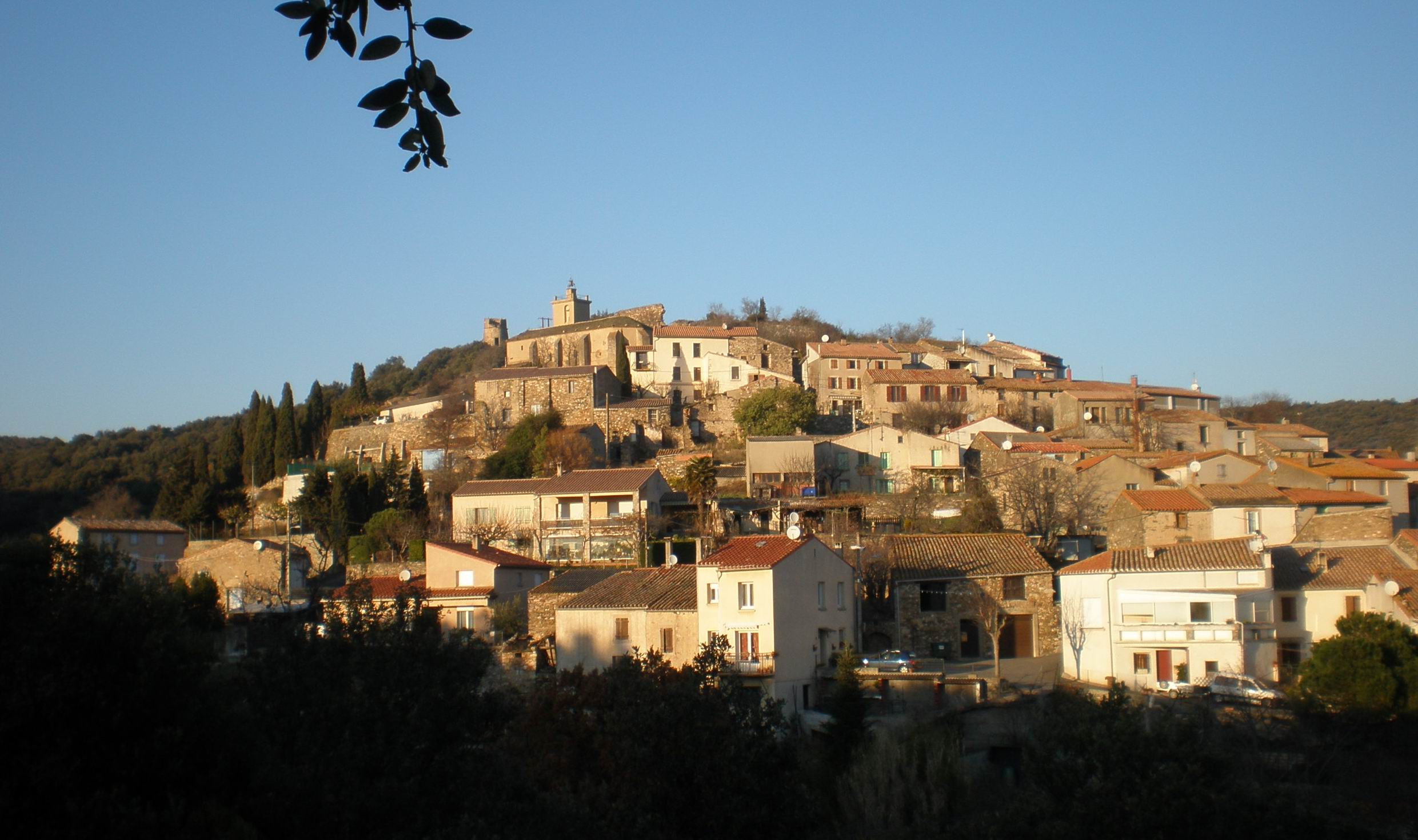
- A general view of Sallèles-Cabardès

- Coat of arms
- Location of Sallèles-Cabardès
- Location within France Location within Occitanie
- Coordinates: 43°19′30″N 2°25′14″E
- Country: France
- Region: Occitania
- Department: Aude
- Arrondissement: Carcassonne
- Canton: Le Haut-Minervois
- Intercommunality: Carcassonne Agglo

Government
  - Mayor (2020–2026): Jean-Michel Jean
- Area^{1}: 6.82 km^{2} (2.63 sq mi)
- Elevation: 282 m (925 ft)
- Highest elevation: 480 m (1,570 ft)
- Lowest elevation: 147 m (482 ft)
- Population (2023): 110
  - Density: 16/km^{2} (42/sq mi)
- Time zone: UTC+01:00 (CET)
  - Summer (DST): UTC+02:00 (CEST)
- INSEE/Postal code: 11368 /11600
- ^{1} French Land Register data, which excludes lakes, ponds, glaciers > 1 km^{2} (0.386 sq mi or 247 acres) and river estuaries.

Sallèles-Cabardès (French pronunciation: [salɛl kabaʁdɛs]; Occitan: Salèlas de Cabardés) is a commune in the Aude department in southern France.

== Population ==
Historical population
Year	Pop.	±% p.a.
1968	159	—
1975	97	−6.82%
1982	125	+3.69%
1990	115	−1.04%
1999	105	−1.01%
2007	114	+1.03%
2012	112	−0.35%
2017	119	+1.22%
2023	110	−1.30%
Source: INSEE

== See also ==
- Communes of the Aude department
