= Caunettes-en-Val =

Commune in Occitanie, France

- Commune
- Coat of arms
- Location of Caunettes-en-Val
- Location within France Location within Occitanie
- Coordinates: 43°03′52″N 2°33′16″E
- Country: France
- Region: Occitania
- Department: Aude
- Arrondissement: Carcassonne
- Canton: La Montagne d'Alaric
- Intercommunality: Carcassonne Agglo

Government
  - Mayor (2020–2026): Jean-Paul Bernède
- Area^{1}: 8.71 km^{2} (3.36 sq mi)
- Elevation: 210 m (690 ft)
- Highest elevation: 363 m (1,191 ft)
- Lowest elevation: 159 m (522 ft)
- Population (2023): 56
  - Density: 6.4/km^{2} (17/sq mi)
- Time zone: UTC+01:00 (CET)
  - Summer (DST): UTC+02:00 (CEST)
- INSEE/Postal code: 11083 /11220
- ^{1} French Land Register data, which excludes lakes, ponds, glaciers > 1 km^{2} (0.386 sq mi or 247 acres) and river estuaries.

Caunettes-en-Val (French pronunciation: [konɛt ɑ̃ val]) is a commune in the Aude department in southern France.

== Population ==
Historical population
Year	Pop.	±% p.a.
1968	60	—
1975	58	−0.48%
1982	57	−0.25%
1990	58	+0.22%
1999	36	−5.16%
2007	56	+5.68%
2012	54	−0.72%
2017	44	−4.01%
2023	56	+4.10%
Source: INSEE

== See also ==
- Corbières AOC
- Communes of the Aude department
