= Blomac =

Commune in Occitanie, France

- Commune
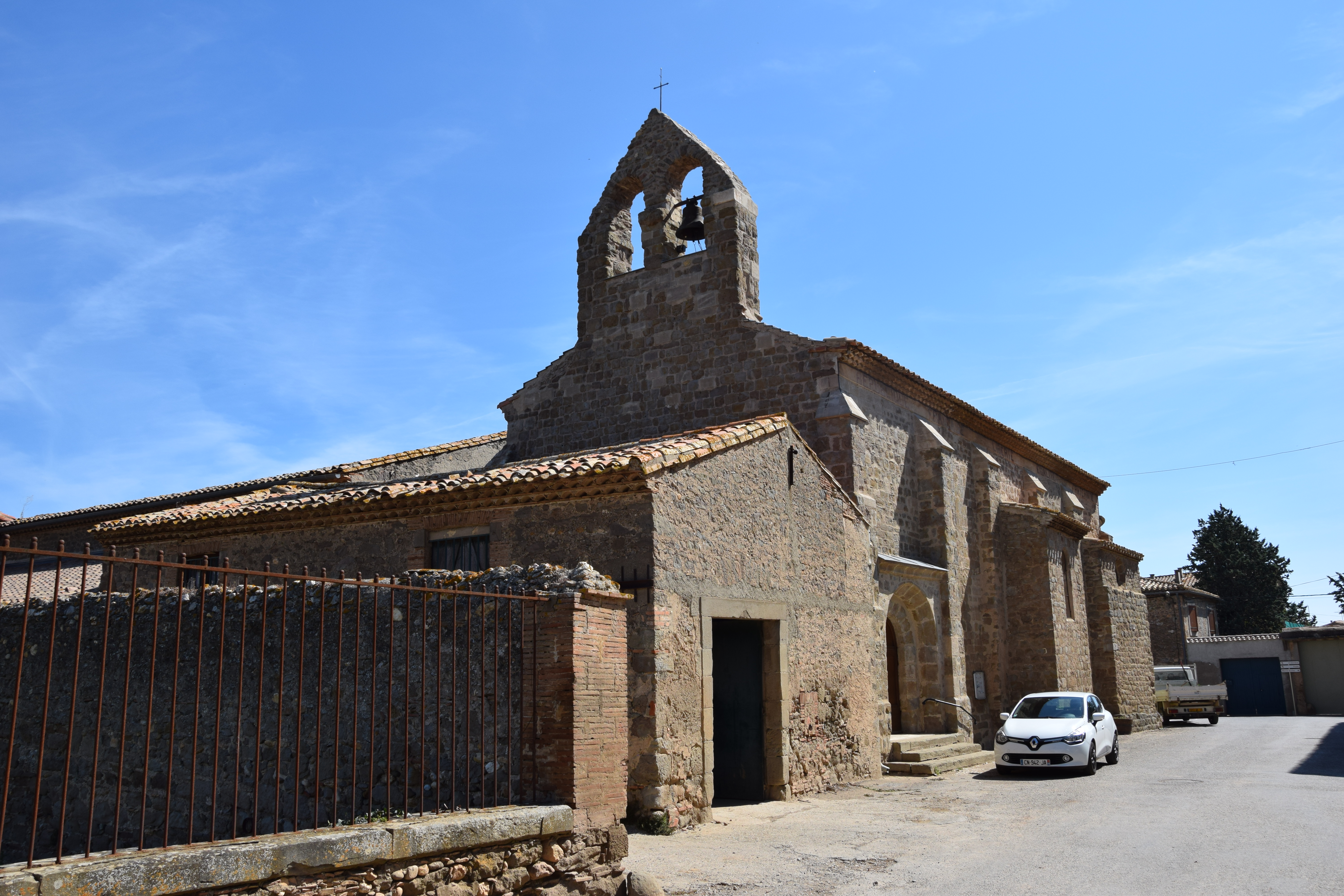
- The church in Blomac

- Coat of arms
- Location of Blomac
- Location within France Location within Occitanie
- Coordinates: 43°12′18″N 2°35′50″E
- Country: France
- Region: Occitania
- Department: Aude
- Arrondissement: Carcassonne
- Canton: La Montagne d'Alaric
- Intercommunality: Carcassonne Agglo

Government
  - Mayor (2020–2026): Thierry Falcou
- Area^{1}: 8.41 km^{2} (3.25 sq mi)
- Elevation: 60 m (200 ft)
- Highest elevation: 86 m (282 ft)
- Lowest elevation: 56 m (184 ft)
- Population (2023): 264
  - Density: 31.4/km^{2} (81.3/sq mi)
- Time zone: UTC+01:00 (CET)
  - Summer (DST): UTC+02:00 (CEST)
- INSEE/Postal code: 11042 /11700
- ^{1} French Land Register data, which excludes lakes, ponds, glaciers > 1 km^{2} (0.386 sq mi or 247 acres) and river estuaries.

Blomac (French pronunciation: [blɔmak]) is a commune in the Aude department in southern France.

== Population ==
Historical population
Year	Pop.	±% p.a.
1968	246	—
1975	206	−2.50%
1982	210	+0.28%
1990	221	+0.64%
1999	200	−1.10%
2007	194	−0.38%
2012	206	+1.21%
2017	227	+1.96%
2023	264	+2.55%
Source: INSEE

== See also ==
- Communes of the Aude department
