= Roquecourbe-Minervois =

Commune in Occitanie, France

- Commune
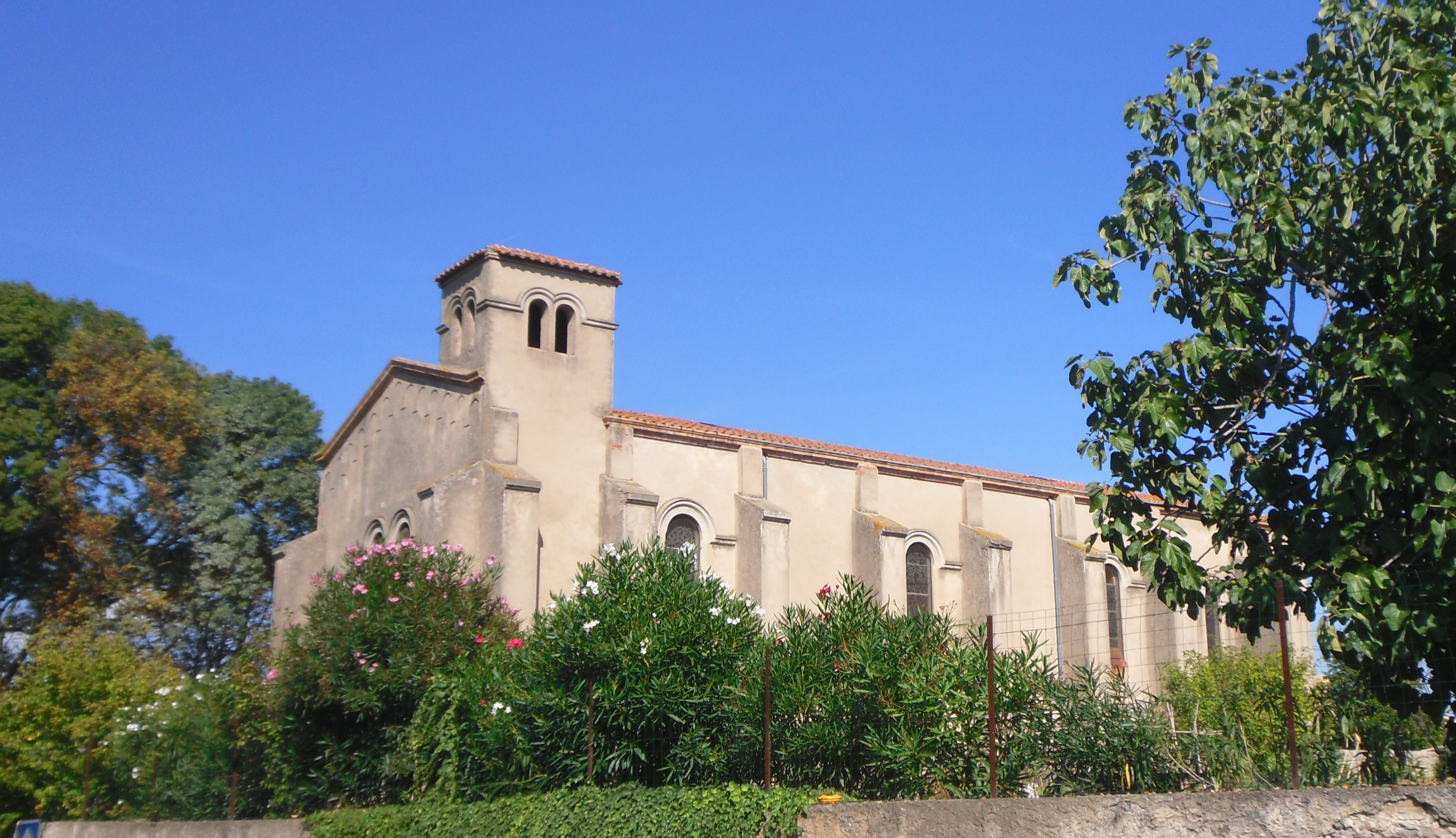
- The church in Roquecourbe-Minervois

- Coat of arms
- Location of Roquecourbe-Minervois
- Location within France Location within Occitanie
- Coordinates: 43°13′16″N 2°39′00″E
- Country: France
- Region: Occitania
- Department: Aude
- Arrondissement: Narbonne
- Canton: La Montagne d'Alaric

Government
  - Mayor (2020–2026): Corinne Giacometti
- Area^{1}: 3.62 km^{2} (1.40 sq mi)
- Elevation: 47 m (154 ft)
- Highest elevation: 121 m (397 ft)
- Lowest elevation: 49 m (161 ft)
- Population (2023): 150
  - Density: 41/km^{2} (110/sq mi)
- Time zone: UTC+01:00 (CET)
  - Summer (DST): UTC+02:00 (CEST)
- INSEE/Postal code: 11318 /11700
- ^{1} French Land Register data, which excludes lakes, ponds, glaciers > 1 km^{2} (0.386 sq mi or 247 acres) and river estuaries.

Roquecourbe-Minervois is a commune in the Aude department in southern France.

== Population ==
Historical population
Year	Pop.	±% p.a.
1968	120	—
1975	120	+0.00%
1982	110	−1.24%
1990	111	+0.11%
1999	109	−0.20%
2007	120	+1.21%
2012	118	−0.34%
2017	132	+2.27%
2023	150	+2.15%
Source: INSEE

== See also ==
- Communes of the Aude department
