= Carcassonne Agglo =

Government structure in Occitanie, France

- Communauté d'agglomération
- Interactive map of Carcassonne Agglo
- Coordinates: 43°10′N 02°20′E
- Country: France
- Region: Occitania
- Department: Aude
- No. of communes: {{{nbcomm}}}
- Established: 2013
- Area: 1,062.2 km^{2} (410.1 sq mi)
- Population (2017): 112,852
  - Density: 106.24/km^{2} (275.17/sq mi)
- Website: www.carcassonne-agglo.fr

Carcassonne Agglo (Occitan: Carcassona Agló) is the agglomeration community, an intercommunal structure, centred on the city of Carcassonne. It is located in the department of Aude, in the region of Occitania, southern France. It was created in January 2013. Its seat is in Carcassonne. Its area is 1062.2 km^{2}. Its population was 112,852 in 2017, of which 46,031 in Carcassonne proper.

== Composition ==
The communauté d'agglomération consists of the following 83 communes:

1. Aigues-Vives
2. Alairac
3. Alzonne
4. Aragon
5. Arquettes-en-Val
6. Arzens
7. Azille
8. Badens
9. Bagnoles
10. Barbaira
11. Berriac
12. Blomac
13. Bouilhonnac
14. Cabrespine
15. Capendu
16. Carcassonne
17. Castans
18. Caunes-Minervois
19. Caunettes-en-Val
20. Caux-et-Sauzens
21. Cavanac
22. Cazilhac
23. Citou
24. Comigne
25. Conques-sur-Orbiel
26. Couffoulens
27. Douzens
28. Fajac-en-Val
29. Floure
30. Fontiès-d'Aude
31. Labastide-en-Val
32. Laure-Minervois
33. Lavalette
34. Lespinassière
35. Leuc
36. Limousis
37. Malves-en-Minervois
38. Marseillette
39. Mas-des-Cours
40. Mayronnes
41. Montclar
42. Montirat
43. Montolieu
44. Monze
45. Moussoulens
46. Palaja
47. Pennautier
48. Pépieux
49. Peyriac-Minervois
50. Pezens
51. Pomas
52. Preixan
53. Puichéric
54. Raissac-sur-Lampy
55. La Redorte
56. Rieux-en-Val
57. Rieux-Minervois
58. Rouffiac-d'Aude
59. Roullens
60. Rustiques
61. Sainte-Eulalie
62. Saint-Frichoux
63. Saint-Martin-le-Vieil
64. Sallèles-Cabardès
65. Serviès-en-Val
66. Taurize
67. Trassanel
68. Trausse
69. Trèbes
70. Val-de-Dagne
71. Ventenac-Cabardès
72. Verzeille
73. Villalier
74. Villar-en-Val
75. Villarzel-Cabardès
76. Villedubert
77. Villefloure
78. Villegailhenc
79. Villegly
80. Villemoustaussou
81. Villeneuve-Minervois
82. Villesèquelande
83. Villetritouls
