= Fajac-en-Val =

Commune in Occitanie, France

- Commune
- Location of Fajac-en-Val
- Location within France Location within Occitanie
- Coordinates: 43°07′19″N 2°27′34″E
- Country: France
- Region: Occitania
- Department: Aude
- Arrondissement: Carcassonne
- Canton: La Montagne d'Alaric
- Intercommunality: Carcassonne Agglo

Government
  - Mayor (2020–2026): Jean-Louis Aguilhon
- Area^{1}: 13.81 km^{2} (5.33 sq mi)
- Elevation: 355 m (1,165 ft)
- Highest elevation: 582 m (1,909 ft)
- Lowest elevation: 292 m (958 ft)
- Population (2023): 54
  - Density: 3.9/km^{2} (10/sq mi)
- Time zone: UTC+01:00 (CET)
  - Summer (DST): UTC+02:00 (CEST)
- INSEE/Postal code: 11133 /11220
- ^{1} French Land Register data, which excludes lakes, ponds, glaciers > 1 km^{2} (0.386 sq mi or 247 acres) and river estuaries.

Fajac-en-Val (French pronunciation: [faʒak ɑ̃ val]) is a commune in the Aude department in southern France.

== Population ==
Historical population
Year	Pop.	±% p.a.
1968	32	—
1975	26	−2.92%
1982	33	+3.46%
1990	32	−0.38%
1999	30	−0.71%
2007	30	+0.00%
2012	37	+4.28%
2017	38	+0.53%
2023	54	+6.03%
Source: INSEE

== See also ==
- Communes of the Aude department
