= Douzens =

Commune in Occitanie, France

- Commune
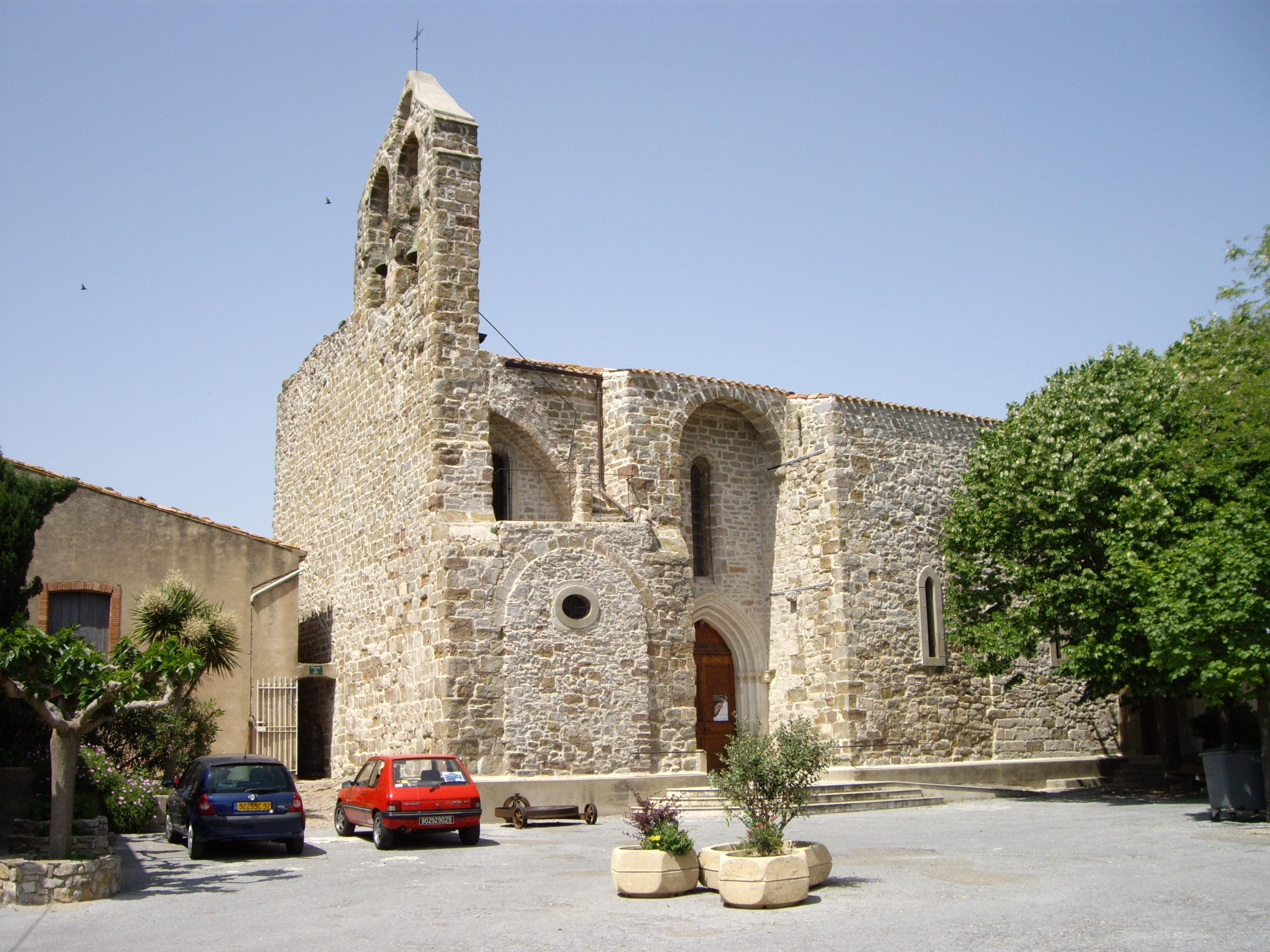
- The church in Douzens

- Coat of arms
- Location of Douzens
- Location within France Location within Occitanie
- Coordinates: 43°11′11″N 2°35′53″E
- Country: France
- Region: Occitania
- Department: Aude
- Arrondissement: Carcassonne
- Canton: La Montagne d'Alaric
- Intercommunality: Carcassonne Agglo

Government
  - Mayor (2020–2026): Philippe Rappeneau
- Area^{1}: 14.91 km^{2} (5.76 sq mi)
- Elevation: 82 m (269 ft)
- Highest elevation: 587 m (1,926 ft)
- Lowest elevation: 53 m (174 ft)
- Population (2023): 784
  - Density: 52.6/km^{2} (136/sq mi)
- Time zone: UTC+01:00 (CET)
  - Summer (DST): UTC+02:00 (CEST)
- INSEE/Postal code: 11122 /11700
- ^{1} French Land Register data, which excludes lakes, ponds, glaciers > 1 km^{2} (0.386 sq mi or 247 acres) and river estuaries.

Douzens (Occitan: Dotze) is a commune in the Aude department in southern France.

== Population ==
Historical population
Year	Pop.	±% p.a.
1968	800	—
1975	674	−2.42%
1982	642	−0.69%
1990	554	−1.83%
1999	606	+1.00%
2007	706	+1.93%
2012	706	+0.00%
2017	733	+0.75%
2023	784	+1.13%
Source: INSEE

== See also ==
- Corbières AOC
- Communes of the Aude department
