= Castans =

Commune in Occitanie, France

- Commune
- Coat of arms
- Location of Castans
- Location within France Location within Occitanie
- Coordinates: 43°24′29″N 2°29′02″E
- Country: France
- Region: Occitania
- Department: Aude
- Arrondissement: Carcassonne
- Canton: Le Haut-Minervois
- Intercommunality: Carcassonne Agglo

Government
  - Mayor (2020–2026): Yolande Piton
- Area^{1}: 17.01 km^{2} (6.57 sq mi)
- Elevation: 650 m (2,130 ft)
- Highest elevation: 1,187 m (3,894 ft)
- Lowest elevation: 380 m (1,250 ft)
- Population (2023): 124
  - Density: 7.29/km^{2} (18.9/sq mi)
- Time zone: UTC+01:00 (CET)
  - Summer (DST): UTC+02:00 (CEST)
- INSEE/Postal code: 11075 /11160
- ^{1} French Land Register data, which excludes lakes, ponds, glaciers > 1 km^{2} (0.386 sq mi or 247 acres) and river estuaries.

Castans (Occitan: Castanhs) is a commune in the Aude department in southern France.

== Population ==
Historical population
Year	Pop.	±% p.a.
1968	118	—
1975	107	−1.39%
1982	124	+2.13%
1990	111	−1.37%
1999	112	+0.10%
2007	119	+0.76%
2012	109	−1.74%
2017	134	+4.22%
2023	124	−1.28%
Source: INSEE

== See also ==
- Communes of the Aude department
