= Marseillette =

Commune in Occitanie, France

- Commune
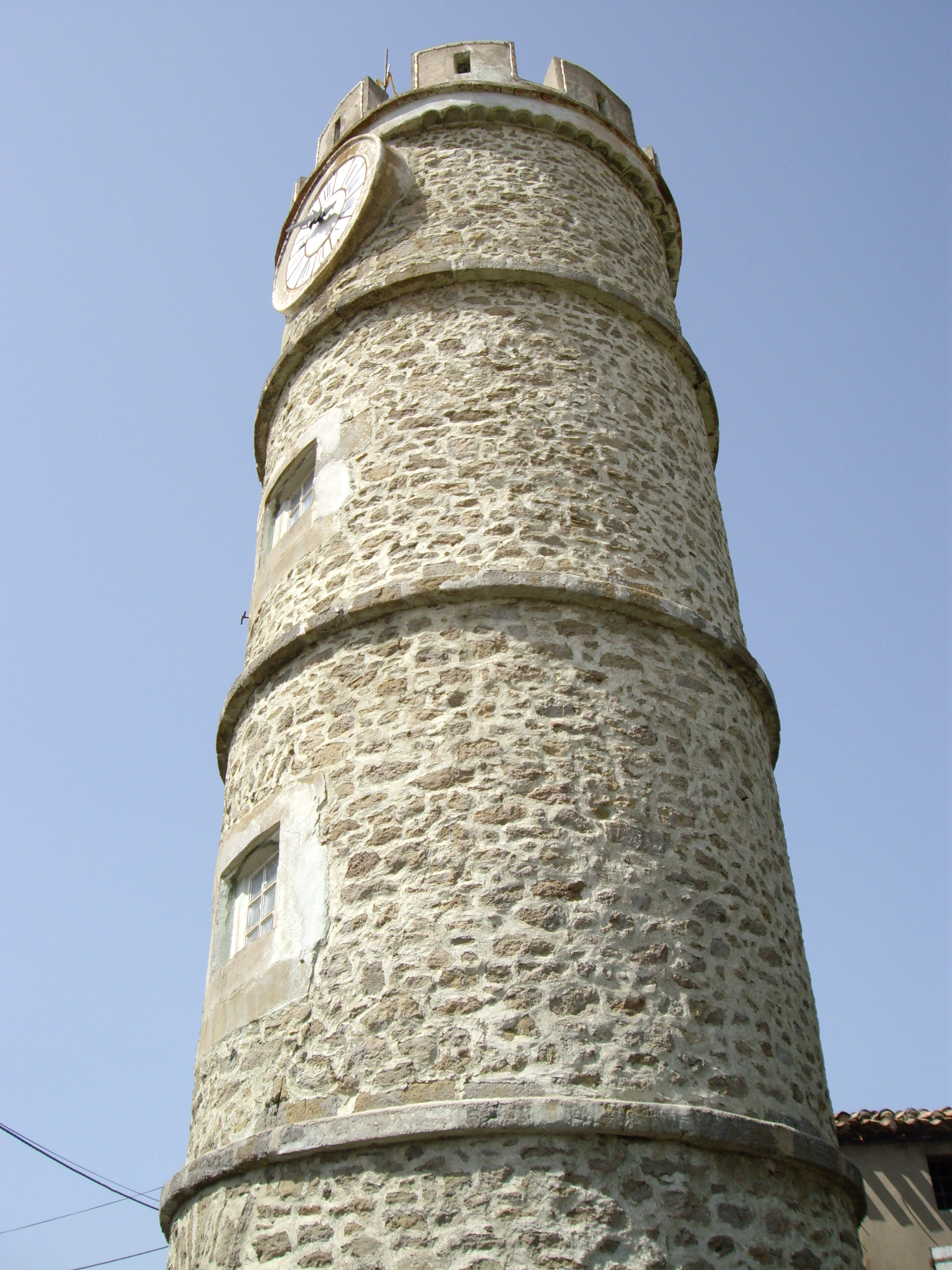
- Clock tower

- Coat of arms
- Location of Marseillette
- Location within France Location within Occitanie
- Coordinates: 43°12′14″N 2°32′34″E
- Country: France
- Region: Occitania
- Department: Aude
- Arrondissement: Carcassonne
- Canton: La Montagne d'Alaric
- Intercommunality: Carcassonne Agglo

Government
  - Mayor (2020–2026): Bernadette Duclos
- Area^{1}: 11.17 km^{2} (4.31 sq mi)
- Elevation: 78 m (256 ft)
- Highest elevation: 118 m (387 ft)
- Lowest elevation: 52 m (171 ft)
- Population (2023): 697
  - Density: 62.4/km^{2} (162/sq mi)
- Time zone: UTC+01:00 (CET)
  - Summer (DST): UTC+02:00 (CEST)
- INSEE/Postal code: 11220 /11800
- ^{1} French Land Register data, which excludes lakes, ponds, glaciers > 1 km^{2} (0.386 sq mi or 247 acres) and river estuaries.

Marseillette (French pronunciation: [maʁsɛjɛt]; Occitan: Marselheta) is a commune in the Aude department in southern France.

== Population ==
Historical population
Year	Pop.	±% p.a.
1968	748	—
1975	647	−2.05%
1982	606	−0.93%
1990	645	+0.78%
1999	678	+0.56%
2007	706	+0.51%
2012	687	−0.54%
2017	712	+0.72%
2023	697	−0.35%
Source: INSEE

== See also ==
- Communes of the Aude department
