= Capendu =

Commune in Occitanie, France

- Commune
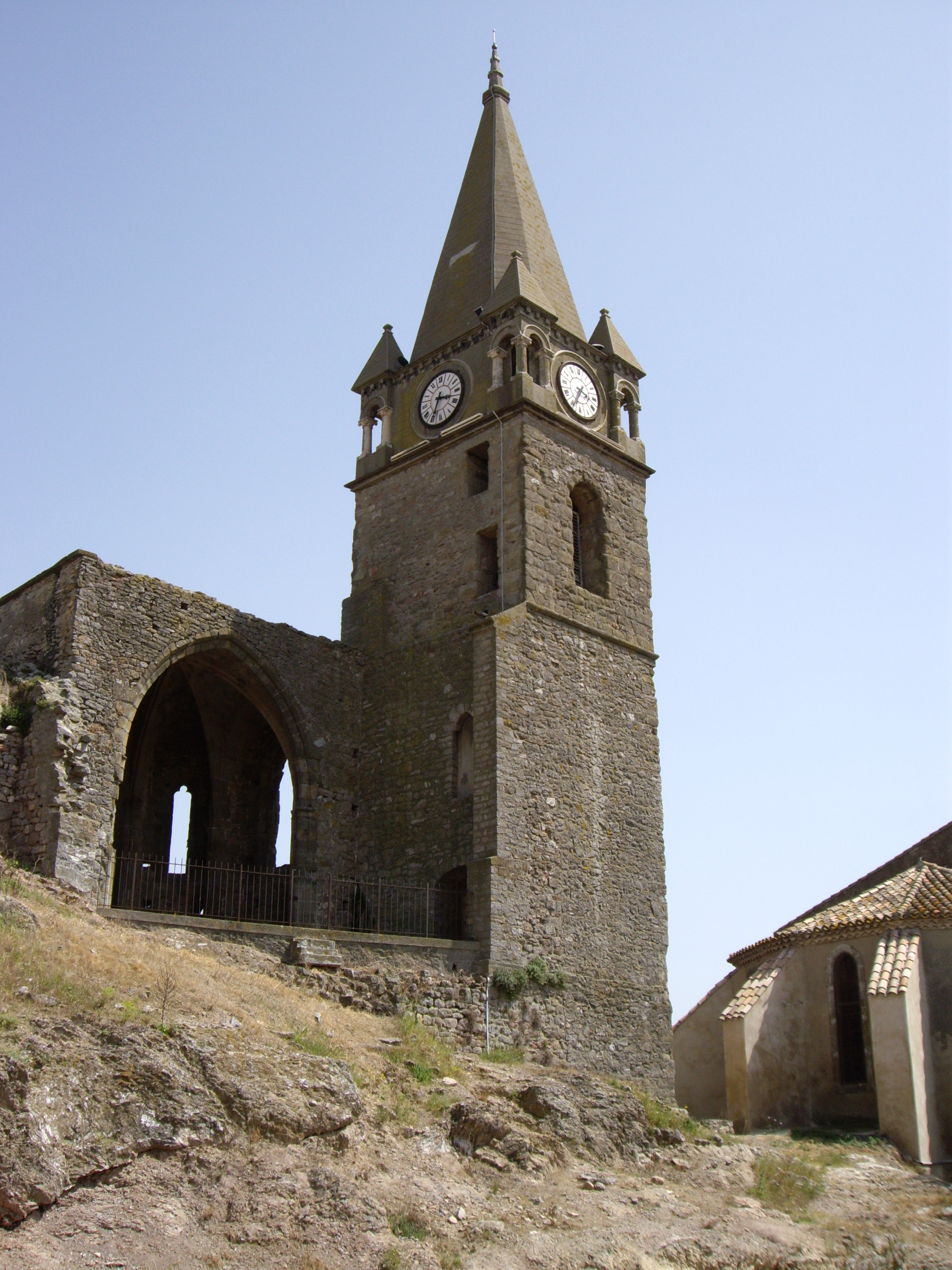
- Ruins of the chateau

- Coat of arms
- Location of Capendu
- Location within France Location within Occitanie
- Coordinates: 43°11′06″N 2°33′37″E
- Country: France
- Region: Occitania
- Department: Aude
- Arrondissement: Carcassonne
- Canton: La Montagne d'Alaric
- Intercommunality: Carcassonne Agglo

Government
  - Mayor (2020–2026): Claude Busto
- Area^{1}: 15.12 km^{2} (5.84 sq mi)
- Elevation: 83 m (272 ft)
- Highest elevation: 461 m (1,512 ft)
- Lowest elevation: 59 m (194 ft)
- Population (2023): 1,453
  - Density: 96.10/km^{2} (248.9/sq mi)
- Time zone: UTC+01:00 (CET)
  - Summer (DST): UTC+02:00 (CEST)
- INSEE/Postal code: 11068 /11700
- ^{1} French Land Register data, which excludes lakes, ponds, glaciers > 1 km^{2} (0.386 sq mi or 247 acres) and river estuaries.

Capendu (French pronunciation: [kapɑ̃dy]; Occitan: Campendut) is a commune in the Aude department in southern France.

== Etymology ==
Mentioned in the form Campendud 1071. Occitan “sloping field”, “inclined field”. Fortuitous homophony with Capendu, hamlet of Blainville-Crevon (Seine-Maritime) which means “hung cat”. Armorial bearings

== History ==
One finds potteries dating about 20.000 years ago in the Mayrac locality. The traces reveal a Roman camp site near the placement of the windmill of Roque Del Die (Occitan for Rock of God).

== Population ==
Historical population
Year	Pop.	±% p.a.
1968	1,413	—
1975	1,160	−2.78%
1982	1,198	+0.46%
1990	1,291	+0.94%
1999	1,380	+0.74%
2007	1,500	+1.05%
2012	1,604	+1.35%
2017	1,468	−1.76%
2023	1,453	−0.17%
Source: INSEE

== Events ==
For seven years, FestiVoix, organized by the community of communes, has invited choral societies and artists.

== See also ==
- Corbières AOC
- Communes of the Aude department
