= Arrondissement of Carcassonne =

Coordinates: 43.22°N 2.35°E

Carcassonne
- Arrondissement
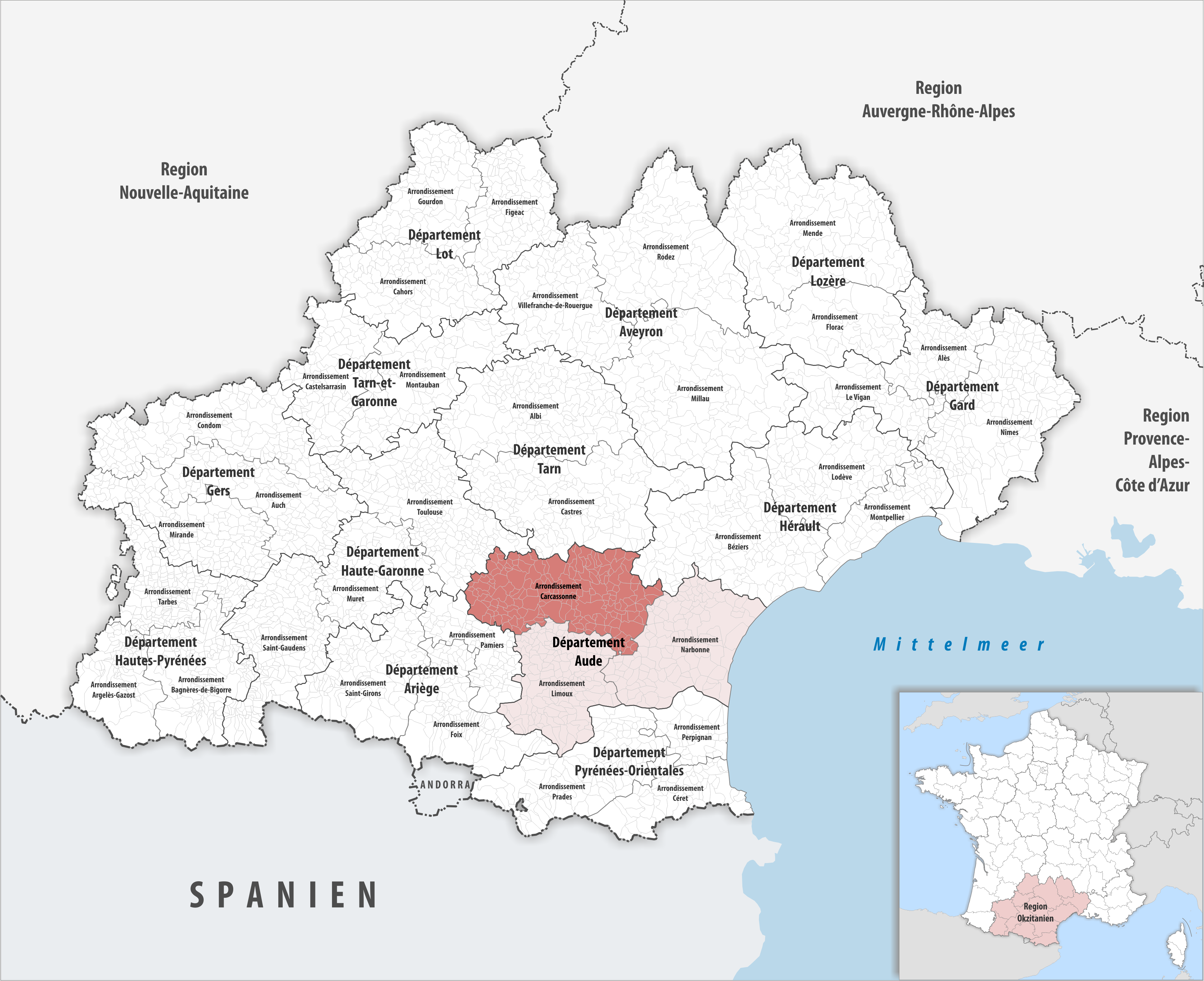
- Location within the region Occitanie
- Country: France
- Region: Occitania
- Department: Aude
- No. of communes: {{{nbcomm}}}
- Area: 2,309.7 km^{2} (891.8 sq mi)
- Population (2023): 163,632
  - Density: 70.846/km^{2} (183.49/sq mi)
- INSEE code: 111

The arrondissement of Carcassonne is an arrondissement of France in the Aude department in the Occitanie région. Its INSEE code is 111 and its capital city is Carcassonne. It has 186 communes. Its population is 163,034 (2021), and its area is 2,309.7 km^{2} (891.8 sq mi).

It is the northernmost of the arrondissements of the department. The main cities in the arrondissement are Carcassonne (47,068 inhabitants in 2012), Castelnaudary (11,748 inhabitants) and Trèbes (5,280 inhabitants).

== Geography ==
The arrondissement of Carcassonne occupies the northwestern part of the department and is bordered to the north by the Tarn department, to the northeast by the Hérault department, to the east by the arrondissement of Narbonne, to the southwest by the arrondissement of Limoux, to the west by the Ariège department and to the northwest by the Haute-Garonne department.

== Composition ==
The communes of the arrondissement of Carcassonne, and their INSEE codes, are:

1. Aigues-Vives (11001)
2. Airoux (11002)
3. Alairac (11005)
4. Alzonne (11009)
5. Aragon (11011)
6. Arquettes-en-Val (11016)
7. Arzens (11018)
8. Azille (11022)
9. Badens (11023)
10. Bagnoles (11025)
11. Baraigne (11026)
12. Barbaira (11027)
13. Belflou (11030)
14. Belpech (11033)
15. Berriac (11037)
16. Blomac (11042)
17. Bouilhonnac (11043)
18. Bram (11049)
19. Brézilhac (11051)
20. Brousses-et-Villaret (11052)
21. Les Brunels (11054)
22. Cabrespine (11056)
23. Cahuzac (11057)
24. Capendu (11068)
25. Carcassonne (11069)
26. Carlipa (11070)
27. La Cassaigne (11072)
28. Les Cassés (11074)
29. Castans (11075)
30. Castelnaudary (11076)
31. Caudebronde (11079)
32. Caunes-Minervois (11081)
33. Caunettes-en-Val (11083)
34. Caux-et-Sauzens (11084)
35. Cavanac (11085)
36. Cazalrenoux (11087)
37. Cazilhac (11088)
38. Cenne-Monestiés (11089)
39. Citou (11092)
40. Comigne (11095)
41. Conques-sur-Orbiel (11099)
42. Couffoulens (11102)
43. Cumiès (11114)
44. Cuxac-Cabardès (11115)
45. Douzens (11122)
46. Fajac-en-Val (11133)
47. Fajac-la-Relenque (11134)
48. Fanjeaux (11136)
49. Fendeille (11138)
50. Fenouillet-du-Razès (11139)
51. Ferran (11141)
52. Floure (11146)
53. Fonters-du-Razès (11149)
54. Fontiers-Cabardès (11150)
55. Fontiès-d'Aude (11151)
56. La Force (11153)
57. Fournes-Cabardès (11154)
58. Fraisse-Cabardès (11156)
59. Gaja-la-Selve (11159)
60. Generville (11162)
61. Gourvieille (11166)
62. Hounoux (11173)
63. Les Ilhes (11174)
64. Issel (11175)
65. Labastide-d'Anjou (11178)
66. Labastide-en-Val (11179)
67. Labastide-Esparbairenque (11180)
68. Labécède-Lauragais (11181)
69. Lacombe (11182)
70. Lafage (11184)
71. Laprade (11189)
72. Lasbordes (11192)
73. Lasserre-de-Prouille (11193)
74. Lastours (11194)
75. Laurabuc (11195)
76. Laurac (11196)
77. Laure-Minervois (11198)
78. Lavalette (11199)
79. Lespinassière (11200)
80. Leuc (11201)
81. Limousis (11205)
82. La Louvière-Lauragais (11208)
83. Malves-en-Minervois (11215)
84. Marquein (11218)
85. Marseillette (11220)
86. Les Martys (11221)
87. Mas-Cabardès (11222)
88. Mas-des-Cours (11223)
89. Mas-Saintes-Puelles (11225)
90. Mayreville (11226)
91. Mayronnes (11227)
92. Mézerville (11231)
93. Miraval-Cabardes (11232)
94. Mireval-Lauragais (11234)
95. Molandier (11236)
96. Molleville (11238)
97. Montauriol (11239)
98. Montclar (11242)
99. Montferrand (11243)
100. Montirat (11248)
101. Montmaur (11252)
102. Montolieu (11253)
103. Montréal (11254)
104. Monze (11257)
105. Moussoulens (11259)
106. Orsans (11268)
107. Palaja (11272)
108. Payra-sur-l'Hers (11275)
109. Pécharic-et-le-Py (11277)
110. Pech-Luna (11278)
111. Pennautier (11279)
112. Pépieux (11280)
113. Pexiora (11281)
114. Peyrefitte-sur-l'Hers (11283)
115. Peyrens (11284)
116. Peyriac-Minervois (11286)
117. Pezens (11288)
118. Plaigne (11290)
119. Plavilla (11291)
120. La Pomarède (11292)
121. Pradelles-Cabardès (11297)
122. Preixan (11299)
123. Puginier (11300)
124. Puichéric (11301)
125. Raissac-sur-Lampy (11308)
126. La Redorte (11190)
127. Ribouisse (11312)
128. Ricaud (11313)
129. Rieux-en-Val (11314)
130. Rieux-Minervois (11315)
131. Roquefère (11319)
132. Rouffiac-d'Aude (11325)
133. Roullens (11327)
134. Rustiques (11330)
135. Saint-Amans (11331)
136. Saint-Denis (11339)
137. Sainte-Camelle (11334)
138. Sainte-Eulalie (11340)
139. Saint-Frichoux (11342)
140. Saint-Gaudéric (11343)
141. Saint-Julien-de-Briola (11348)
142. Saint-Martin-Lalande (11356)
143. Saint-Martin-le-Vieil (11357)
144. Saint-Michel-de-Lanès (11359)
145. Saint-Papoul (11361)
146. Saint-Paulet (11362)
147. Saint-Sernin (11365)
148. Saissac (11367)
149. Sallèles-Cabardès (11368)
150. Salles-sur-l'Hers (11371)
151. Salsigne (11372)
152. Serviès-en-Val (11378)
153. Souilhanels (11382)
154. Souilhe (11383)
155. Soupex (11385)
156. Taurize (11387)
157. La Tourette-Cabardès (11391)
158. Trassanel (11395)
159. Trausse (11396)
160. Trèbes (11397)
161. Tréville (11399)
162. Val-de-Dagne (11251)
163. Ventenac-Cabardès (11404)
164. Verdun-en-Lauragais (11407)
165. Verzeille (11408)
166. Villalier (11410)
167. Villanière (11411)
168. Villardonnel (11413)
169. Villar-en-Val (11414)
170. Villarzel-Cabardès (11416)
171. Villasavary (11418)
172. Villautou (11419)
173. Villedubert (11422)
174. Villefloure (11423)
175. Villegailhenc (11425)
176. Villegly (11426)
177. Villemagne (11428)
178. Villemoustaussou (11429)
179. Villeneuve-la-Comptal (11430)
180. Villeneuve-lès-Montréal (11432)
181. Villeneuve-Minervois (11433)
182. Villepinte (11434)
183. Villesèquelande (11437)
184. Villesiscle (11438)
185. Villespy (11439)
186. Villetritouls (11440)

== History ==
The arrondissement of Carcassonne was created in 1800. At the January 2017 reorganization of the arrondissements of Aude, it lost 27 communes to the arrondissement of Narbonne, and it gained seven communes from the arrondissement of Limoux.

As a result of the reorganisation of the cantons of France which came into effect in 2015, the borders of the cantons are no longer related to the borders of the arrondissements. The cantons of the arrondissement of Carcassonne were, as of January 2015:

1. Alzonne
2. Belpech
3. Capendu
4. Carcassonne-1
5. Carcassonne-2-Nord
6. Carcassonne-2-Sud
7. Carcassonne-3
8. Castelnaudary-Nord
9. Castelnaudary-Sud
10. Fanjeaux
11. Lagrasse
12. Mas-Cabardès
13. Montréal
14. Mouthoumet
15. Peyriac-Minervois
16. Saissac
17. Salles-sur-l'Hers
