= Baraigne =

Commune in Occitanie, France

- Commune
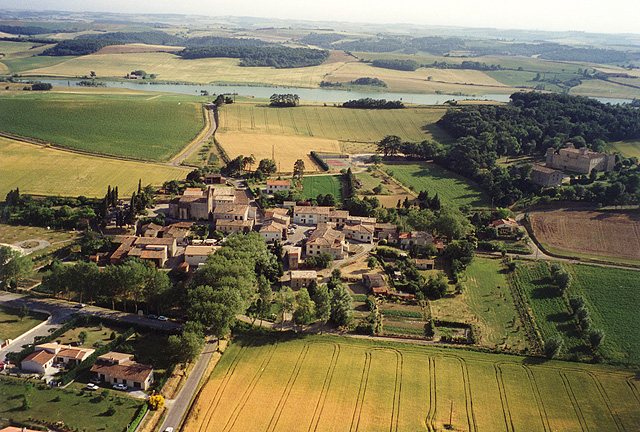
- An aerial view of Baraigne

- Coat of arms
- Location of Baraigne
- Location within France Location within Occitanie
- Coordinates: 43°19′53″N 1°49′27″E
- Country: France
- Region: Occitania
- Department: Aude
- Arrondissement: Carcassonne
- Canton: La Piège au Razès
- Intercommunality: Castelnaudary Lauragais Audois

Government
  - Mayor (2020–2026): Pascal Assemat
- Area^{1}: 4.76 km^{2} (1.84 sq mi)
- Elevation: 260 m (850 ft)
- Highest elevation: 285 m (935 ft)
- Lowest elevation: 208 m (682 ft)
- Population (2023): 163
  - Density: 34.2/km^{2} (88.7/sq mi)
- Time zone: UTC+01:00 (CET)
  - Summer (DST): UTC+02:00 (CEST)
- INSEE/Postal code: 11026 /11410
- ^{1} French Land Register data, which excludes lakes, ponds, glaciers > 1 km^{2} (0.386 sq mi or 247 acres) and river estuaries.

Baraigne (French pronunciation: [baʁɛɲ]; Occitan: Baranha) is a commune in the Aude department in the Occitanie region of southern France.

== Geography ==
Baraigne is located in the north-west of the department of Aude some 10 km west by north-west of Castelnaudary and 12 km south-east of Villefranche-de-Lauragais and consists of plateaux and hills delimited by the Castelnaudary plain to the north and Ariege plain to the south with the whole region called La Piège. The northern border of the commune is also the departmental border between Aude and Haute-Garonne. Access to the commune is by the D517 from Molleville in the south-east which passes through the length of the commune just south of the village and continues north-west, changing to the D1517 at the communal border, towards Renneville. The D917 goes north-west from the village to Avignonet-Lauragais, changing to the D80A at the communal border. The D217 goes north-east from the village to Labastide-d'Anjou. The commune is mostly farmland with a few forests.

Geologically it has thick limestone layers that form the relief of the Lauregais Plateau.

The Fresquel river rises in the south-east of the commune which is not far from the Seuil de Naurouze - the highest point on the Canal du Midi between the Atlantic and the Mediterranean - and flows north-west through the length of the commune continuing to eventually join the Aude (river) west of Villedubert. The Ruisseau de Labexen flows from the south-east and forms the southern border of the commune where it becomes an arm of the Lac de la Ganguise, a lake created by the Ganguise Dam.

=== Urbanism ===
The village of Baraigne type is ecclesiastic with the original village clustered around the church in a circulade form. Subsequently, the village developed towards the north and west of this initial area. Today this regular structure has disappeared and there are no remains of any defensive organisation. Only in the north there is the exit of a tunnel that allowed the evacuation of the village in the Middle Ages. In 1980 a communal subdivision extended the village to the east, followed by a second subdivision in 2006.

== Toponymy ==
The name "Baraigne" is probably of Gallo-Roman origin from "Varianus".

The first written testimony of the area dates back to 1155 in the form of "Varanano" and there are different names over the centuries:

- Sancta Maria Varanano, 1207
- Verananum, 1207
- Varanhanum, 1240
- Honor Varanhas, 1260
- Varagnanum, 1317
- Beata Maria Baroha, 1318
- Ecclesia de Varanano 1318
- Varanha, 1382
- Varainhe, 1494
- Varaigne, 1550
- Baragnie, 1750
- Varagne, 1774
- Baragne, 1781
- Baraigne from the twentieth century

The commune name in Occitan is Baranha.

== History ==
=== Middle Ages ===
Although the commune would have been part of the tumultuous history of the region dating back to Celtic times, the first traces of the village date back to the 9th century after the Romans had gone from the region leaving the Via Aquitania linking Narbonne to Toulouse, ending in Burdigala (Bordeaux), and passing the source of the Fresquel in Baraigne. In 1155 the first manuscript testimony of the locality appears with the name Varanano dealing with the construction of the church. In 1206 Vidal de Caumont sold his rights over the Church of Saint Mary of Baraigne to Father Auger.

Around 1210-1225 the Cathar religion settled in the Lauragais. Garsende, the mother of the Lords of Mas-Saintes-Puelles and a Cathar Perfect offered heretical hospitality with her daughter Gaillarde. She undertook the religious education of her little son Bertrand de Quiders and her niece Géraude. The three of them frequently visited Baraigne around 1215. Géraude married Estieu de Roqueville, Lord of Baraigne who, around 1225, led the two women to Caillabel near Baraigne. They stayed there for 15 days and from there went to Montségur where they were burned at the stake. At the same time Bernard de Mayreville, deacon Knight, settled in Mas-Saintes-Puelles. He was tirelessly active in the villages of Laurac, Fanjeaux, and Gaja-la-Selve in the south and in Baraigne at Saint-Michel-de-Lanès in the west.

The "Massacre of Avignonet" took place on 28 May 1242. On that day at Avignonet-Lauragais, troops from the Montsegur region slaughtered the Inquisitors and their suite in their sleep with axes. This was at Baraigne which had completely adopted the heretical Catharism. Reprisals on the village were terrible: the Inquisition troops came to the village and exhumed the bodies of all presumed Cathars and burned them on a pyre erected on an embankment behind the church in the cemetery. All "suspects" had to carry the cross of infamy.

In 1473 and especially in 1480-1481 there were numerous victims of bubonic plague in Baraigne and the surrounding villages.

=== Modern Era ===
In 1485 there were two pastel mills. The region was prosperous with the first building of Baraigne castle dating to this time. The manor house "de Buisson " housed the Lords.

The Wars of religion did not spare Baraigne and its region. Based in Mas-Saintes-Puelles, where they had established themselves in 1561, Protestants made many raids on neighbouring towns and villages. Looting and destruction of villages and towns multiplied. In 1572 all the churches in the country were burned. At Baraigne only a part of the nave and bell tower were destroyed.

Baraigne lived through the French Revolution with alternating periods of calm, due to its isolation, and violent visits made by fervent revolutionaries from the plain. The castle and the church were looted and the archives destroyed.

In 1789 Father Canute was the resident priest from Montferrand. When the National Assembly decreed the civil constitution of the clergy he took the oath to the Constitution. As a "juror priest" he was regarded as an ordinary citizen. He was designated as a member of the Municipal Council in 1792 under his new civil status. Nevertheless, he continued, as he did in the past, to perform baptisms, weddings and funerals.

Quickly the revolutionaries decided to split France into departments. During this work, the members responsible for the operation were assailed with interventions by the village communities who wished to maintain their attachment to the Department of Carcassonne and others who wished to be in another department. Baraigne was historically attached through its Lords to Avignonet-Lauragais, Les Cassés, and Montgiscard, these being areas who had asked to be integrated into Haute-Garonne. But few people at that time carried much weight so the commune became part of the Canton of Salles-sur-l'Hers (Aude) on 6 December 1790.

=== From the Consulate to the Second Empire ===
On 26 November 1791, at the initiative of the departmental council, the district of Castelnaudary reshuffled its cantons. Baraigne passed from the canton of Salles sur l'Hers to that of Saint-Michel-de-Lanès which was newly created. This division lasted until Year IV (1795). Finally on 4 November 1801 (13 Brumaire Year X), the canton of Saint-Michel-de-Lanès was removed. Baraigne then rejoined Salles-sur-l'Hers and the Canton then consisted of the 14 communes that are present today. Baraigne then experienced a tragedy on the night of 12 to 13 October 1802 (21 to 22 Vendémiaire, Year X):

"A band of brigands attacked the miller and his wife in the old mill to rob them. A young carpenter was also with them. Despite their resistance the wife finally confessed to save her life that there was a considerable amount of money in the attic. After completing the theft the bandits killed them all to silence them. But the young carpenter with his throat cut was able to drag himself to the village to alert them and describe his killers. He died the next day. The perpetrators and accomplices totalling 24 in number were arrested in the communes of Salles, Mas Saint Puelles, Castelnaudary, Saint-Michel-de-Lanes, and Avignonet. Only three escaped."

At the beginning of the 19th century the Revolutionary upheavals were abating and the region experienced a demographic explosion. It was in 1812 that Baraigne had its highest population of 241 inhabitants. The village was mainly oriented towards agriculture. A new windmill was built on the north hill which operated without interruption until 1955. The entire population brought their wheat to the communal bread oven.

=== Contemporary ===
After loss of population in the 1860s, the First World War was a second demographic catastrophe for the region. More than 20% of young people between 18 and 25 did not survive the war and, with the death rate of the survivors, a third of the workforce disappeared from Lauragais. At Baraigne nine men did not return to their families.

On 1 September 1939, at the beginning of World War II, many young people and those recalled to the army left Baraigne for a second mobilization. It was not until 1942, however, during the occupation of the southern zone that German troops occupied the area. Baraigne saw a few German troops, particularly at the mill. The village was evacuated several times out of fear but no serious exaction was reported. More than 50 refugees from northern France and Belgium stayed for a few months in the commune, protected and fed by the population. Some did not leave the commune until the 1950s and always come back to the region today. One prisoner from Baraigne in Germany died.

Although this war was less deadly than the first in the region, the population of the region continued to decline. In 1950 the first tractors appeared and revolutionized the agricultural basis of life in the region. In the 1960s due to the expansion of the economy in Toulouse many parts of Lauragais experienced prosperity but Baraigne was too far away to share this experience. In 1970 a second decline was due to the departure of young people. After consolidation in 1990 there were only four farmers sharing the land in the commune. In 1980 the municipality reacted with the establishment of a communal housing estate entirely occupied by young families working in the tertiary sector in Castelnaudary and even Toulouse. In 1990 the creation of social structures (community centre, tennis club etc.) was followed in 2006 by the creation of a second subdivision to deal with the population explosion of the metropolis of Toulouse.

=== Heraldry ===
Arms of Baraigne	The official status of the blazon remains to be determined. Blazon: Quarterly, at 1 party per fesse, Argent a demi-lion Sable issuant in base first, Or a tree Vert second; at 2 Azure a chess-rook of Or; at 3 Azure three escallops Or 2 and 1; at 4 Or, three fesses Gules.

== Administration ==
List of Successive Mayors

From	To	Name
1860	1888	Jean Fraisse
1888	1903	Baptiste Brousse
1903	1908	Antoine Gaubert
1908	1919	Laurent Brousse
1919	1953	Joseph Ourmet
1953	2007	Louis Faure
2007	2020	Camille Guagno
2020	2026	Pascal Assemat

== Demography ==
The inhabitants of the commune are known as Baraignois or Baraignoises in French.

Historical population

Year	Pop.	±% p.a.
1793	183	—
1821	178	−0.10%
1846	203	+0.53%
1872	197	−0.12%
1901	149	−0.96%
1926	121	−0.83%
1946	123	+0.08%
1962	111	−0.64%
1968	113	+0.30%

Year	Pop.	±% p.a.
1975	99	−1.87%
1982	103	+0.57%
1990	122	+2.14%
1999	126	+0.36%
2007	128	+0.20%
2012	167	+5.46%
2017	174	+0.82%
2023	163	−1.08%

Source: EHESS and INSEE

== Economy ==
In 2017 unemployment was 12% in the commune. Participation rate in the workforce for ages 15 to 64 was 80%

At the end of 2015, 11 establishments were operating in Baraigne: 5 in the primary sector (agriculture, forestry, fishery), 2 in the secondary sector (industry, construction) and 4 in the tertiary sector (trade and services).

In 2017, the median household net income was 20,410 euros.

== Culture and heritage ==
=== Civil heritage ===
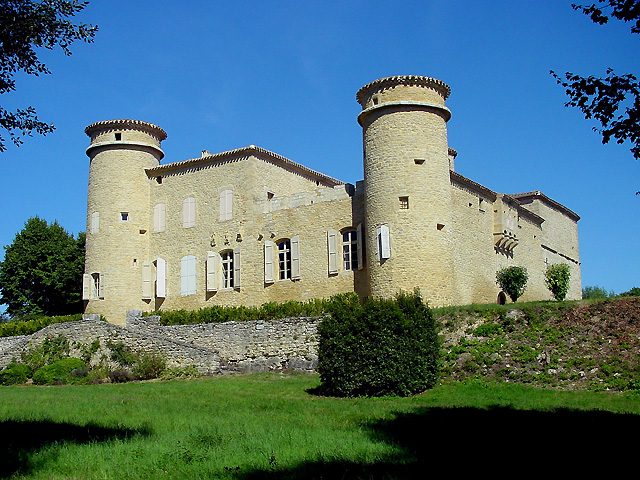
The Château of Baraigne

- The Chateau of Baraigne (16th century) is registered as an historical monument. The Chateau is built on a small hill overlooking the village 300 m to the west of the town in a style called "Pastel". Although some parts appear to date back to the 15th century, its construction is attributed essentially to Barthélémy de Buisson (1568-1622), Lord of Baraigne. Almost completely ruined by the early 1970s, the castle has been restored rigorously to its original appearance between 1975 and 2014 by the current owner. The Renaissance building is on three sides of a large quadrilateral, flanked by three corner towers and with an interior courtyard. The whole was surrounded by a moat, now gone, but whose existence is attested by the remains of a drawbridge.

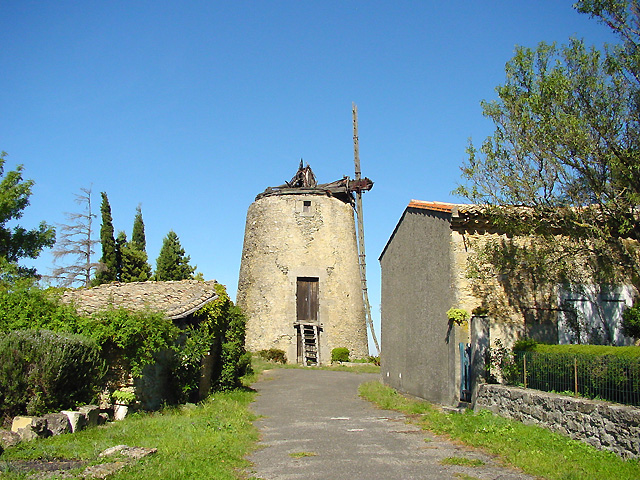
The Windmill

- The Windmill is located 1 km north-east of the village. The building, built in 1812, has some unusual features for Lauragais: it has two work areas and, even more rare, it has three pairs of millstones. The main wheel main is on the ground floor with the other two in the first floor room which is accessed by a small exterior staircase of nine steps. The mill was powered by just two sails instead of the usual four which proves the strength of the winds in the Lauragais region. The movement of the roof and sails is through a rack and pinion operated by a crank on the first floor. After operating clandestinely during the Second World War, the mill ceased operations around 1952. Despite the collapse of the roof to expose the large rouet and which damaged a sail, the mill equipment is almost complete.

=== Religious heritage ===
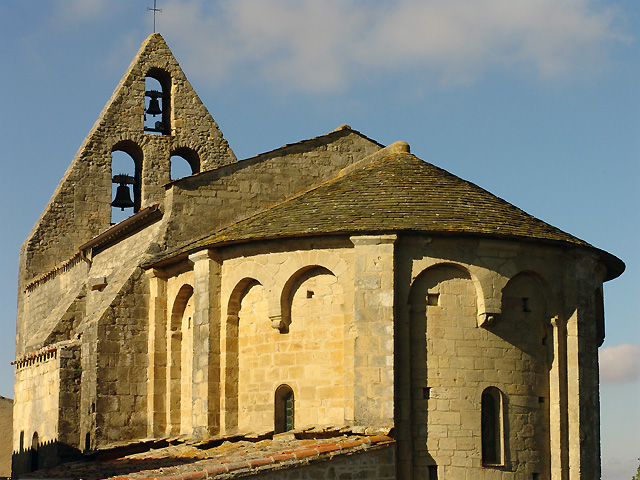
The Church of Saint Mary

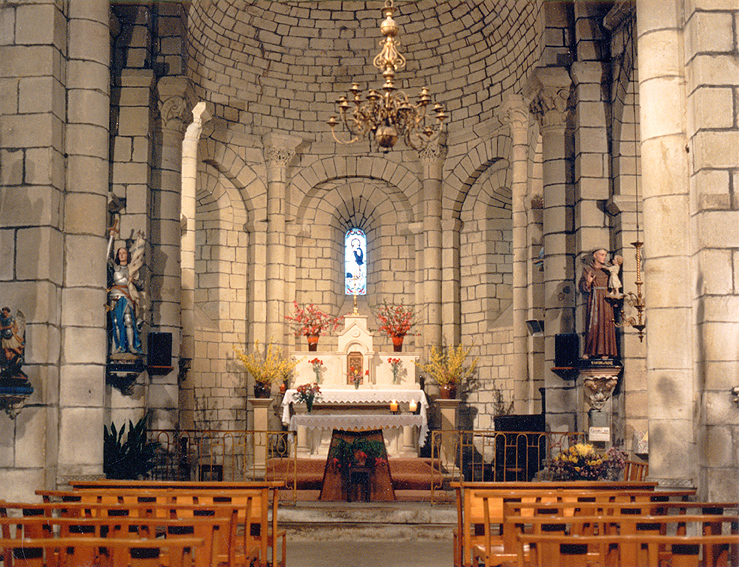
The interior of the Church

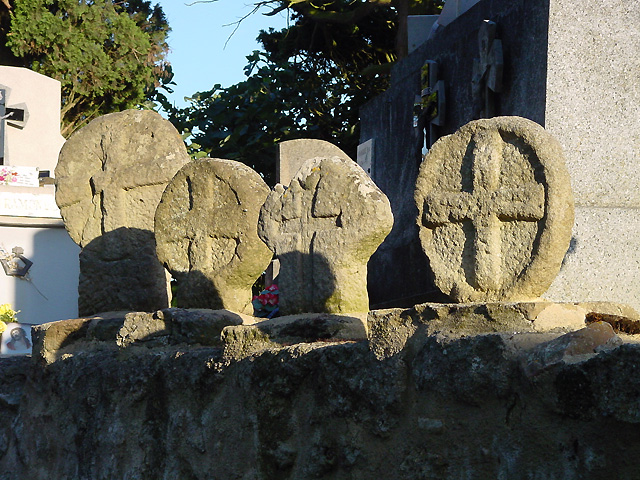
The Discoidal Steles

The Church of Saint Mary (12th century) is registered as an historical monument. It is one of the finest examples of Romanesque churches in Aude. It is located south of the present town after having once been at the centre. The oldest documents mentioning the church date back to 1207. In 1317, when Pope John XXII built the Saint-Papoul Cathedral in the bishopric dependent on the Archbishop of Toulouse, Baraigne was placed in the new Diocese of Saint-Papoul and stayed there until the French Revolution. The building is oriented east to west. It consists of an apse and a nave flanked by two chapels. These chapels in the transept are additions from the 19th century. A bell tower with gables surmounts the west wall with the entrance being to the south of the nave. Originally rectangular, the bell tower became triangular by additions which collapsed on the sides and perhaps on the top. On 6 March 1995 a third bell was installed at the top and complete the electrified Carillon. The internal dimensions of the church are:

- Total length: 17.29 m
- Width: 5.10 m
- Length of the nave: 8.85 m
- Depth of the apse: 5.44 m
- Length of each chapel: 3.00 m
- Depth of each Chapel: 2.50 m
- Wall Thickness: 1.00 m

The Church contains several items that are registered as historical objects:

- Discoidal Steles (Middle Ages) in the Cemetery. Some of these Discoidal Steles date back to the Middle Ages (9th century for the oldest) but seem to have no connection with the Cathars. Four of these steles are installed at the entrance of the cemetery including the latest, discovered in 1993, and two others sealed in its boundary wall. On three of them, the cross is in relief whereas it is hollow on the fourth and part of the base is missing. Two crosses and one discoidal stele are next to the chevet of the church. One of these headstones dates back to the 13th century and was housed in the church. The Limoux museum also displays a discoidal stele found at Baraigne.
- 6 Altar Candlesticks (17th century)
- A Funeral Cross (12th century)
- A Collection Plate (16th century)
- A Collection Plate: Grapes of the Promised Land (16th century)

=== Environmental heritage ===
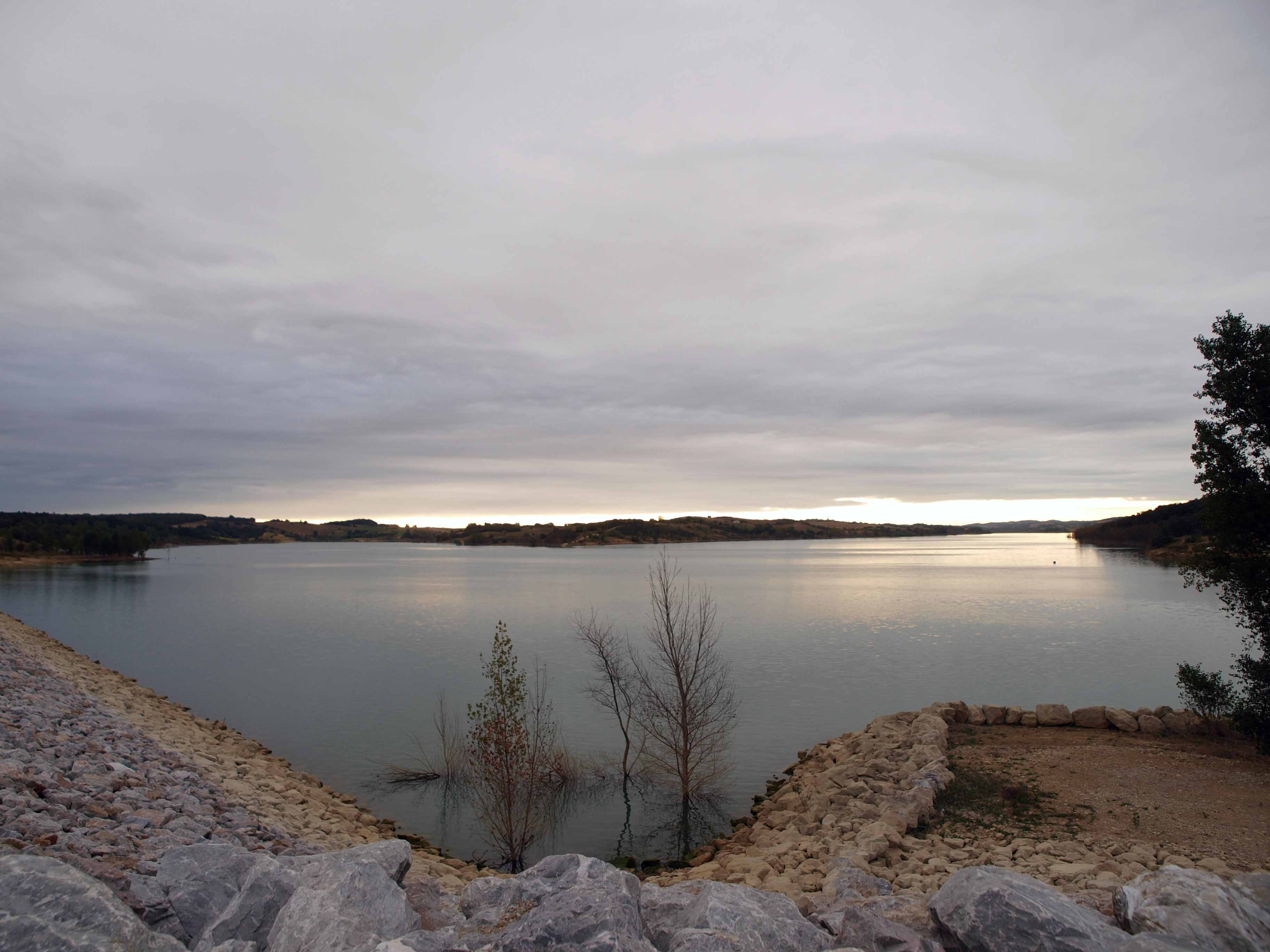
The Lac de la Ganguise

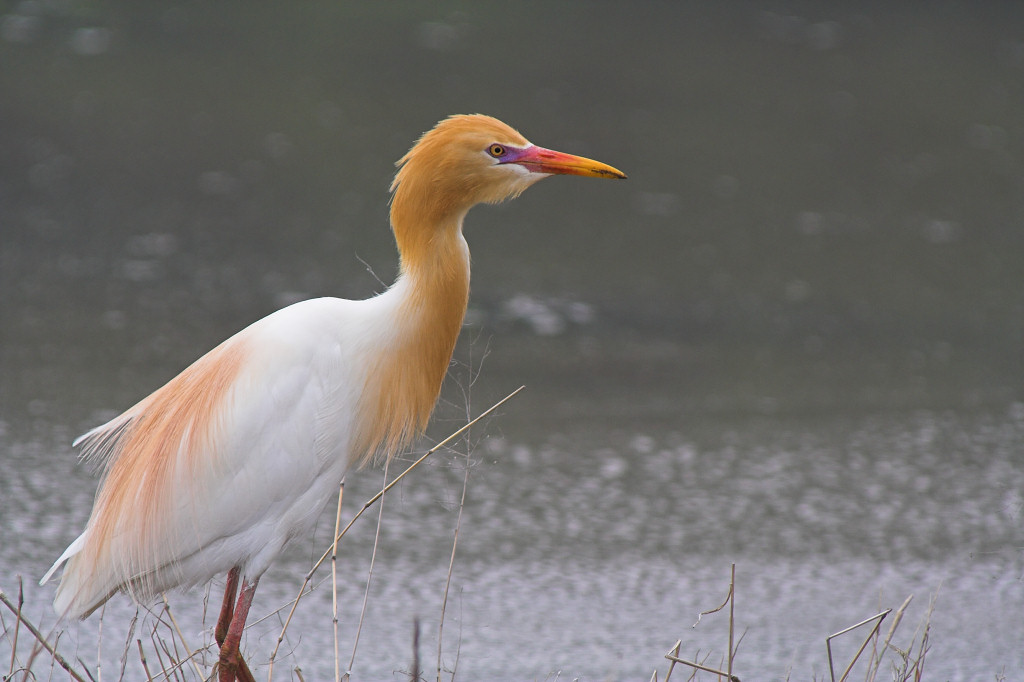
The Cattle egret

- The Lac de la Ganguise or "Retenue de l'Estrade" (the name of a nearby farm) is an artificial lake spread over the territory of five communes including Baraigne. It was created by a dam built on the Ganguise in 1979 to improve irrigation of agricultural land and was enlarged in 2007. It is a departmental leisure centre.
- A Zone naturelle d'intérêt écologique, faunistique et floristique (ZNIEFF) (Natural Zone of Ecological Interest for flora and fauna) has been created aimed at creating and inventory of plant and animal species that are present but this is not accompanied by any measures of regulatory protection. The zone includes Baraigne as well as 39 other communes in the ZNIEFF Collines de la Piège. The Cattle egret (Bubulcus ibis) is one of the most notable species here but is listed on the red list of endangered species of the world.

=== The Ultralight aviation base ===
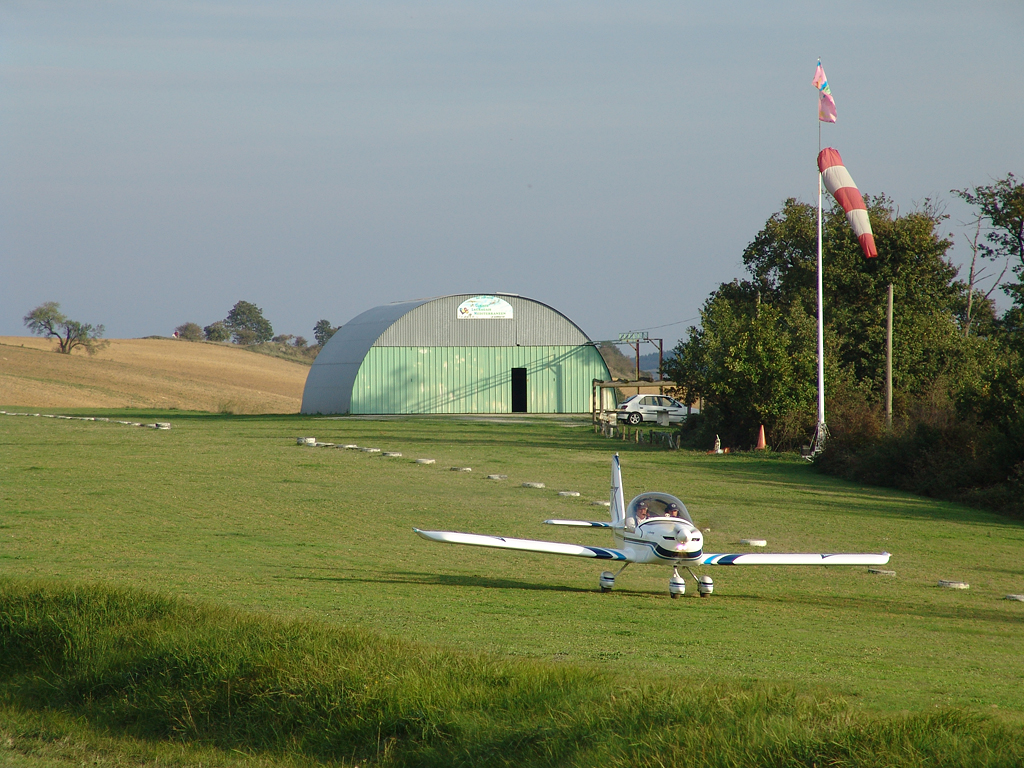
The ULM base

South of the village there is an Ultralight aviation (ULM) base for private access with registration number LF1123. Technical specifications are: Runway: RWY 11-29 Grass: 280m x 15m Radio frequency: 123.45 pilot/pilot Altitude: 920 feet Coordinates: N 43° 19.24' - E 01° 50.07'

It is recommended to avoid overflying the village and approach from the south. There is turbulence from Autan and Marin winds.

== Facilities ==
=== Education ===
The town has no primary or secondary school. Primary schooling is provided in Avignonet-Lauragais and Mas-Saintes-Puelles, neighbouring communes. Secondary education, college and high schools, are located in Castelnaudary. All schools are served by daily buses. The commune falls within the Academy of Montpellier district and is part of Zone A of the school year.

=== Health ===
There are no health services in the commune. The nearest doctors are located in Labastide-d'Anjou. The closest hospitals are located at Castelnaudary.

== Notable people linked to the commune ==
- Gautier de Varagne, knight, was present at the swearing in of the king by the consuls of Carcassonne in 1271.
- Gaufrid de Varagne, brother of Gautier, was elected to the assembly of the nobility of the Seneschal in 1272 and again in 1282 and, in 1287, he was elected governor of Carcassonne.
- Bernard de Varagne in 1433 was the envoy for the Seneschal of Toulouse.
- Jean de Buisson, son of Bernard de Varagne, was Lord of Baragne and capitoul of Toulouse.

== See also ==
- Communes of the Aude department

=== Bibliography ===
- Daniel Bonhoure, Avignonet Lauragais, 1989, Syndicat d'Initiative, Maison des Jeunes et de la Culture et Commune d’Avignonet (in French)
- Doctor Charles Boyer, An Archaeological Excursion in the Piège Baraigne, 1932, E. Roudière, 22 pages (in French)
- François Furet and Denis Richet, French Revolution, 1970, Weidenfeld and Nicolson, 416 pages.
- Romain Plandé, Geography and History of the Department of Aude, 1944, Éditions françaises nouvelles, 205 pages (in French)
- Abbé Sabarthès, Topographic Dictionary of the Department of Aude, 1912 (1st edition), Imprimerie Nationale (reprint Bibliobazaar 2009), 682 pages, ISBN 1113683953 (in French)
