= Airoux =

Commune in Occitanie, France

- Commune
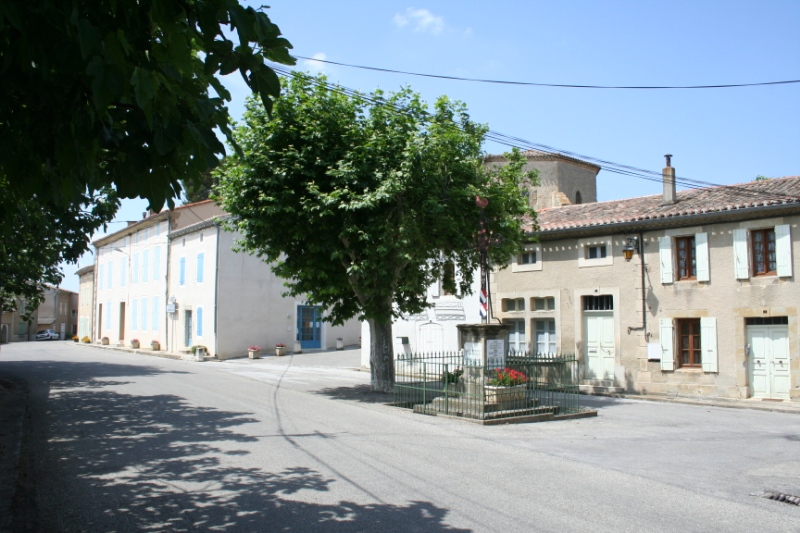
- The main road in Airoux

- Coat of arms
- Location of Airoux
- Location within France Location within Occitanie
- Coordinates: 43°22′00″N 1°52′00″E
- Country: France
- Region: Occitania
- Department: Aude
- Arrondissement: Carcassonne
- Canton: Le Bassin chaurien
- Intercommunality: Castelnaudary Lauragais Audois

Government
  - Mayor (2020–2026): Cédric Malrieu
- Area^{1}: 5.49 km^{2} (2.12 sq mi)
- Elevation: 192 m (630 ft)
- Highest elevation: 251 m (823 ft)
- Lowest elevation: 165 m (541 ft)
- Population (2023): 201
  - Density: 36.6/km^{2} (94.8/sq mi)
- Time zone: UTC+01:00 (CET)
  - Summer (DST): UTC+02:00 (CEST)
- INSEE/Postal code: 11002 /11320
- ^{1} French Land Register data, which excludes lakes, ponds, glaciers > 1 km^{2} (0.386 sq mi or 247 acres) and river estuaries.

Airoux (French pronunciation: [ɛʁu]; Occitan: Airós) is a commune in the Aude department in the Occitanie region of southern France.

== Geography ==
=== Localisation ===
Airoux is within the urban area of Castelnaudary situated in the Lauragais on the Rigole de la plaine. It is located some 5 km north-west of Castelnaudary and 15 km south-east of Villefranche-de-Lauragais. It can be accessed on road D217 from Labastide-d'Anjou in the south through the village and continuing north-east to Soupex. There is also the D1 road from Montmaur in the northwest which also passes through the village and continues south-east to Ricaud. The commune consists entirely of farmland with no other villages or hamlets.

Numerous streams cover the entire commune with the Rigole of the Canal du Midi passing through the northern part of the commune and forming part of the northern border. An unnamed watercourse forms the whole western border between the Rigole and the Fresquel river which forms the southern border of the commune. Numerous other unnamed streams and watercourses flow to the Fresquel from the commune to the south, south-east, and east.

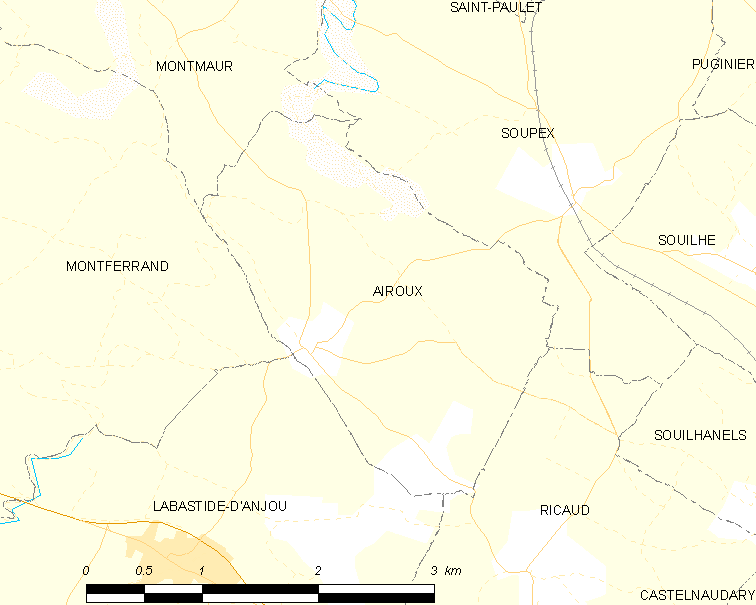
Map of Airoux and its surrounding communes

== Heraldry ==
Arms of Airoux	Blazon: Azur with three pales argent in chief the same.

== Administration ==
List of Successive Mayors of Airoux

Mayors from the French Revolution to 1935

From	To	Name	Party	Position
1751	1754	Jacques Melix		
1754	1766	Antoine Blou		
1766	1772	Jacques Gacher		
1772	1784	Pierre Briane		
1784	1790	Charles Pontnau		
1790	1792	Antoine Biou		
1793	1795	M. Bourdil		
1795	1799	Jean Mazieres		
1799	1808	Jean Pontnau		
1808	1814	Jean Raymond Milhes		
1823	1830	Barthélémy Bessiere		
1830	1831	Emmanuel Denat		
1831	1840	Jean Raymond Monier		
1840	1846	Emmanuel Denat		
1846	1848	Jacques Blou		
1848	1852	Jean Pierre Milhes		
1852	1870	Jacques Milhes		
1870	1871	Jean Pierre Milhes		
1871	1878	Jacques Milhes		
1878	1908	Raymond Milhes		
1908	1919	Antonin Desplats		
1919	1935	Joseph Marty		

Mayors from 1935

From	To	Name	Party	Position
1935	1945	Maurice Geli		
1945	1989	Pierre Geli		
1989	2014	Laurent Geli		
2014	2020	Cédric Malrieu		

== Population ==
The inhabitants of the commune are known as Airouxois or Airouxoises in French.

Historical population
Year	Pop.	±% p.a.
1968	142	—
1975	112	−3.33%
1982	100	−1.61%
1990	110	+1.20%
1999	126	+1.52%
2007	126	+0.00%
2012	147	+3.13%
2017	163	+2.09%
2023	201	+3.55%
Source: INSEE

== Sites and monuments ==
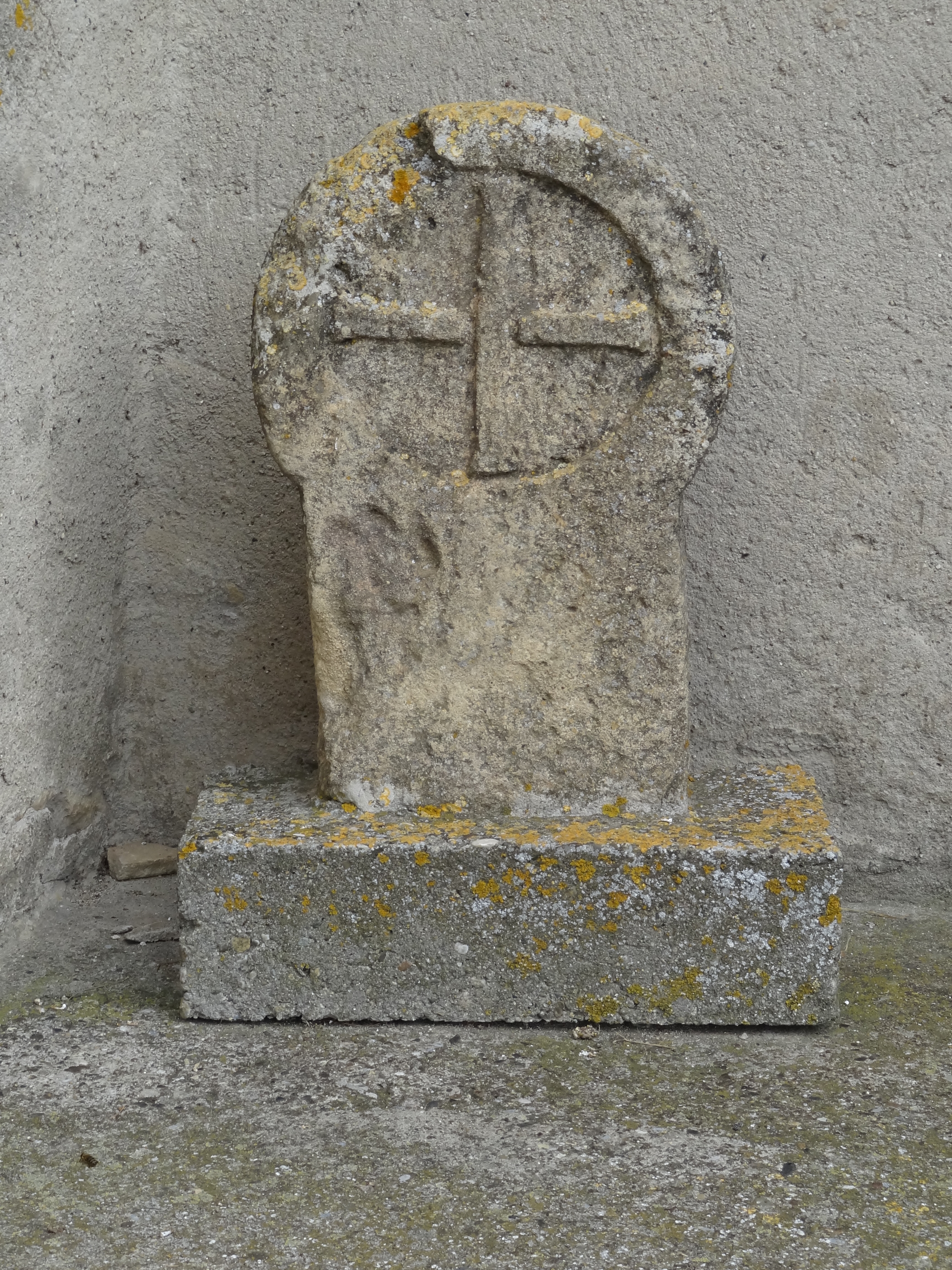
Cemetery Cross at Airoux

The commune has two sites that are registered as historical monuments:

- The Chateau of Airoux (16th century)
- A Cemetery Cross (16th century)

== See also ==
- Communes of the Aude department
- County of Razès
- Cantons of the Aude department
- Arrondissements of the Aude department
