= Montmaur =

Montmaur may refer to the following places in France:

- Montmaur, Hautes-Alpes, a commune in the department of Hautes-Alpes
- Montmaur, Aude, a commune in the department of Aude
