= Lasbordes =

Lasbordes may refer to:

- Lasbordes, Aude, France
- Toulouse – Lasbordes Airport, serving Toulouse
