= Papulus =

French priest and evangelist in Christian tradition

Saint Papulus
- Died: ~300 AD near Toulouse
- Venerated in: Catholic Church; Eastern Orthodox Church
- Feast: November 3

Saint Papulus (French: Papoul) was, according to Christian tradition, a priest who worked with Saturninus of Toulouse to evangelize southern Gaul. Papulus is considered an evangelist of the Lauragais.

Legends associated with Saturninus state that after Saint Peter consecrated him a bishop, "he was given for his companion Papulus, later to become Saint Papulus the Martyr."

He was martyred, like Saturninus, during the persecutions of Diocletian. Papulus' unreliable legend states that upon reaching Carcassonne, he and Saturninus were imprisoned in a tower by the magistrate Rufinus, but they were miraculously released and went to Toulouse. Saturninus went into Spain, leaving Papulus in charge of the Christian converts at Toulouse. His legend states that he performed countless miracles and converted many pagans. He was ultimately beheaded after being tortured.

== Veneration ==
Papulus' relics were translated to the church of Saint Saturninus at Toulouse.

The town of Saint-Papoul was founded during the 8th century when an abbey was established here, dedicated to Papulus.

The diocese of Saint-Papoul, of which Saint-Papoul Cathedral was the center, was created as an episcopal see by John XXII in 1317.
