= Lac de la Ganguise =

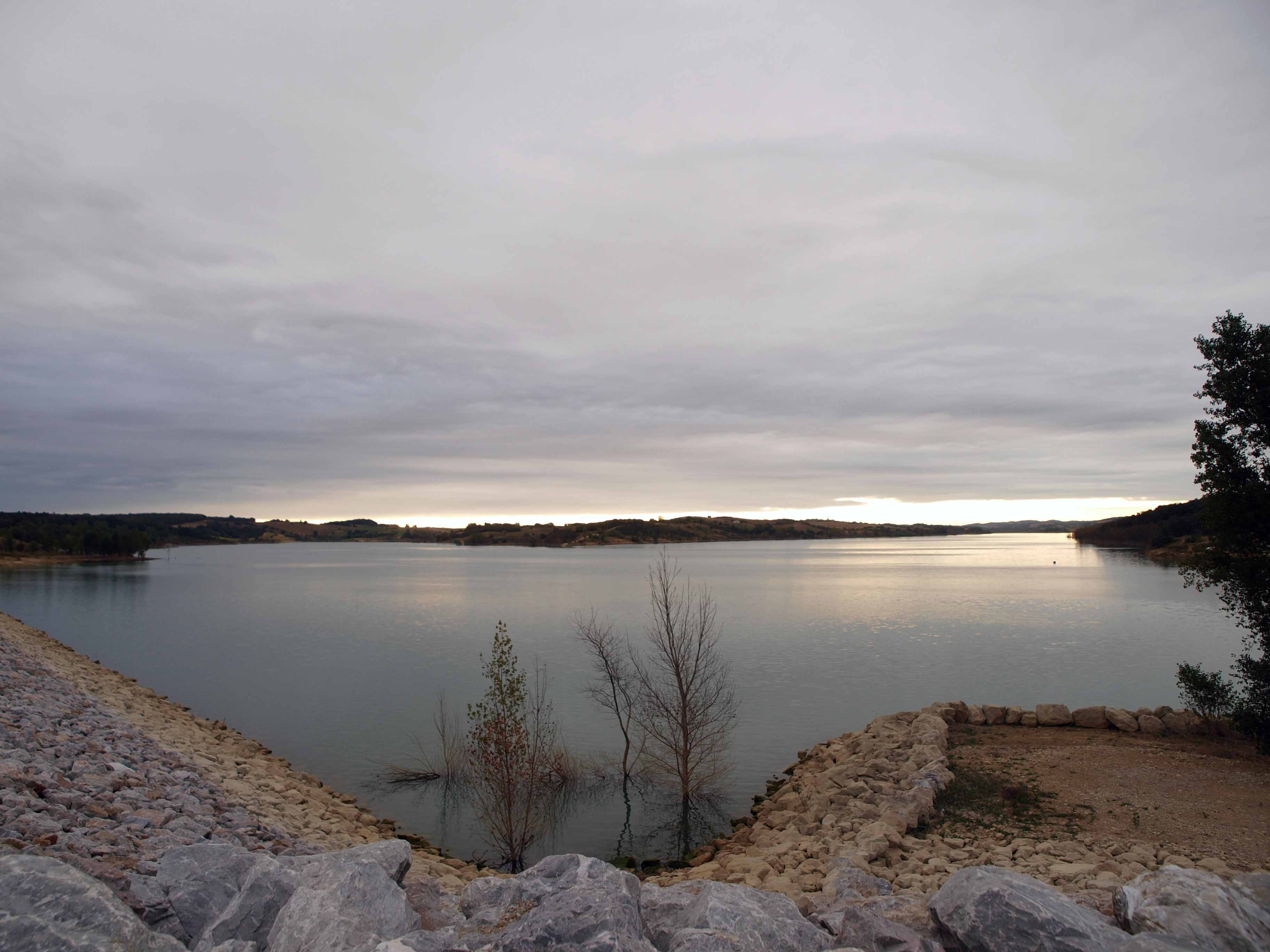

- Location within France
- Location: Aude
- Coordinates: 43°19′10″N 1°48′20″E
- Type: reservoir
- Primary inflows: Ganguise
- Primary outflows: Hers-Mort
- Basin countries: France
- Surface area: 2.78 km^{2} (1.07 sq mi)
- Water volume: 44 hm^{3} (36,000 acre⋅ft)
- Surface elevation: 228 m (748 ft)

Lac de la Ganguise (also known as Retenue de l'Estrade) is a lake in Aude, France. Its surface area is 2.78 km².

It lies in the communes of Baraigne, Cumiès, Gourvieille, Belflou and Molleville.
