= Treville =

Treville of Tréville may refer to:

== Places ==
- Treville, Herefordshire, a former civil parish in England
- Treville, Piedmont, a municipality in Italy
- Treville, Veneto, a frazione in Castelfranco Veneto, Italy
- Tréville, a commune in France

== People ==
- Louis-René Levassor de Latouche Tréville (1745–1804), French admiral
- Georges Tréville (1875–1944), French actor and director

== Other ==
- M. de Tréville, a fictional character in The Three Musketeers
