= Jean de Montpezat de Carbon =

- Archbishop of Sens
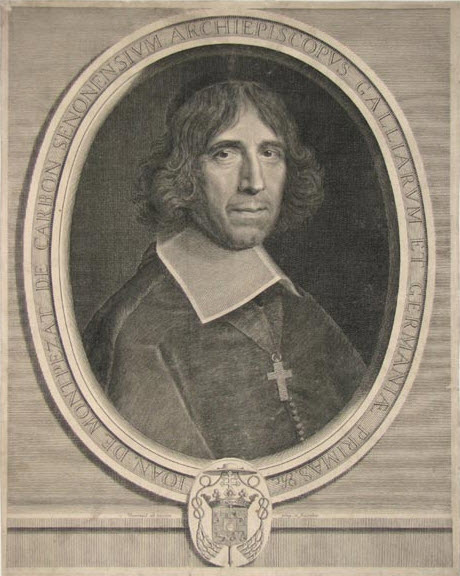
- Church: Catholic Church
- Archdiocese: Archdiocese of Sens
- In office: 6 May 1675 – 5 November 1685
- Predecessor: Louis Henri de Pardaillan de Gondrin
- Successor: Hardouin Fortin de La Hoguette
- Previous posts: Archbishop of Bourges (1665-1675); Bishop of Saint-Papoul (1658-1665)

Orders
- Consecration: 8 September 1658 by Pierre de Marca

Personal details
- Born: 1605 Saint-Martory, Gascony, Kingdom of France
- Died: 5 November 1685 (aged 79–80)

Jean de Montpezat de Carbon (1605 – 5 November 1685) was a French bishop.

== Biography ==
Jean de Montpezat de Carbon was born in Saint-Martory in 1605. He was selected as Bishop of Saint-Papoul on 14 June 1657. Pope Alexander VII confirmed his appointment on 3 June 1658, and he was consecrated as a bishop by Pierre de Marca, Archbishop of Toulouse, on 8 September 1658. He was next selected as Archbishop of Bourges on 18 December 1664, with Pope Alexander VII confirming the appointment on 22 April 1665. Finally, he was selected as Archbishop of Sens on 14 October 1674, with Pope Clement X confirming the appointment on 6 May 1675. He died on 5 November 1685.
