= Fendeille =

Commune in Occitanie, France

- Commune
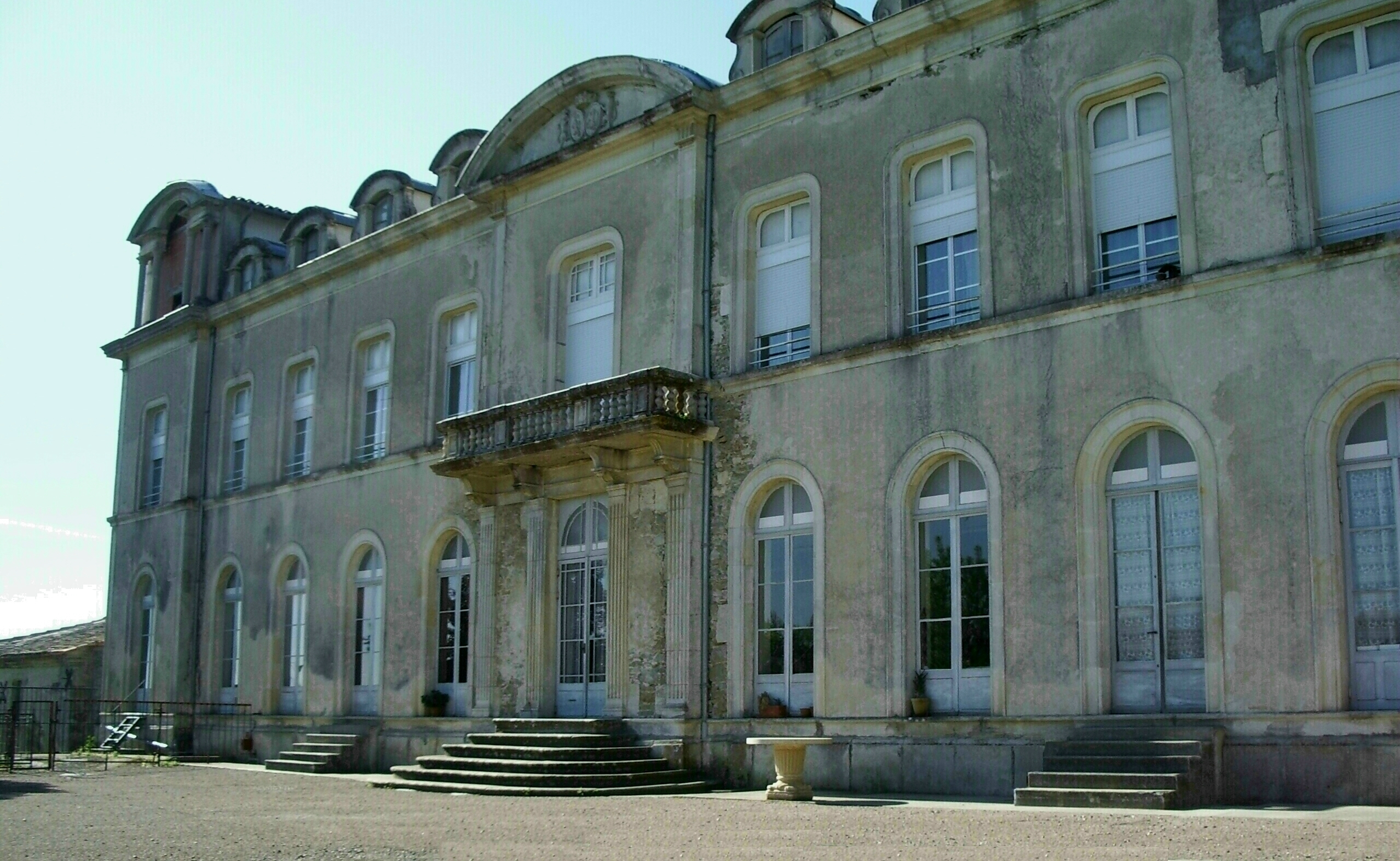
- The chateau in Fendeille

- Coat of arms
- Location of Fendeille
- Location within France Location within Occitanie
- Coordinates: 43°16′14″N 1°56′41″E
- Country: France
- Region: Occitania
- Department: Aude
- Arrondissement: Carcassonne
- Canton: Le Bassin chaurien

Government
  - Mayor (2020–2026): Danielle Fabre
- Area^{1}: 7.17 km^{2} (2.77 sq mi)
- Elevation: 240 m (790 ft)
- Highest elevation: 331 m (1,086 ft)
- Lowest elevation: 154 m (505 ft)
- Population (2023): 658
  - Density: 91.8/km^{2} (238/sq mi)
- Time zone: UTC+01:00 (CET)
  - Summer (DST): UTC+02:00 (CEST)
- INSEE/Postal code: 11138 /11400
- ^{1} French Land Register data, which excludes lakes, ponds, glaciers > 1 km^{2} (0.386 sq mi or 247 acres) and river estuaries.

Fendeille (French pronunciation: [fɑ̃dɛj]; Occitan: Fendelha) is a commune in the Aude department in southern France.

== Population ==
Historical population
Year	Pop.	±% p.a.
1968	227	—
1975	247	+1.21%
1982	289	+2.27%
1990	356	+2.64%
1999	418	+1.80%
2007	558	+3.68%
2012	579	+0.74%
2017	532	−1.68%
2023	658	+3.61%
Source: INSEE

== See also ==
- Communes of the Aude department
