= Jean de La Rochetaillée =

French churchman, jurist and Cardinal

- Cardinal-Priest of San Lorenzo in Lucina
- Church: Catholic Church
- See: San Lorenzo in Lucina
- In office: 27 March 1426 – 24 March 1437
- Predecessor: Simon of Cramaud
- Successor: Giovanni Vitelleschi
- Other post: Administrator of Besançon (1429-1437)
- Previous posts: Administrator of Rouen (1426-1431); Archbishop of Rouen (1423-1426); Administrator of Paris (1422-1423); Titular Patriarch of Constantinople (1412-1423); Administrator of Genève (1418-1422); Administrator of Saint-Papoul (1412-1418)

Orders
- Created cardinal: 24 May 1426 by Pope Martin V

Personal details
- Born: Jean de Fort Rochetaillée-sur-Saône, Lyonnais, Kingdom of France
- Died: 24 March 1437

Jean de La Rochetaillée (died 1437) was a French churchman, eminent jurist, and Cardinal. His real name was Jean de Fort.

He was bishop of Saint-Papoul in 1413, bishop of Geneva in 1418, and bishop of Paris in 1421/2. He became archbishop of Rouen in 1423, but fell out with his chapter. From 1429 to 1437 he was administrator of the diocese of Besançon.

He attended the conclave of 1431.

He was created titular Patriarch of Constantinople in 1412, and Cardinal in 1426. He was Vice-Chancellor of the Holy Roman Church in 1436/7. Jean attended the Council of Basel from May 1433 to April 1435, functioning as the council's vice-chancellor.
