= Saint-Papoul =

Commune in Occitanie, France

- Commune
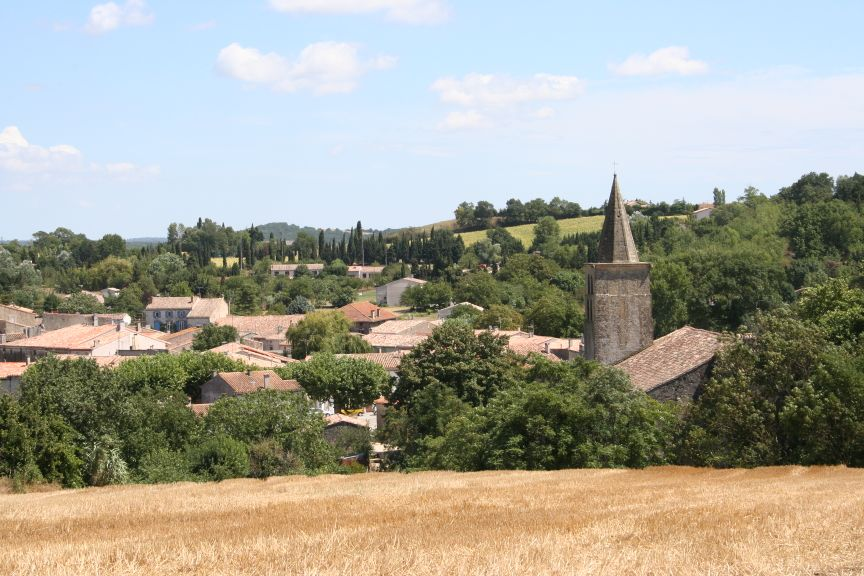
- A general view of Saint-Papoul

- Coat of arms
- Location of Saint-Papoul
- Location within France Location within Occitanie
- Coordinates: 43°19′56″N 2°02′12″E
- Country: France
- Region: Occitania
- Department: Aude
- Arrondissement: Carcassonne
- Canton: Le Bassin chaurien

Government
  - Mayor (2020–2026): Serge Ourliac
- Area^{1}: 26.48 km^{2} (10.22 sq mi)
- Elevation: 159 m (522 ft)
- Highest elevation: 405 m (1,329 ft)
- Lowest elevation: 139 m (456 ft)
- Population (2023): 835
  - Density: 31.5/km^{2} (81.7/sq mi)
- Time zone: UTC+01:00 (CET)
  - Summer (DST): UTC+02:00 (CEST)
- INSEE/Postal code: 11361 /11400
- ^{1} French Land Register data, which excludes lakes, ponds, glaciers > 1 km^{2} (0.386 sq mi or 247 acres) and river estuaries.

Saint-Papoul (French pronunciation: [sɛ̃ papul]; Languedocien: Sant Pàpol) is a commune in the Aude department in southern France.

== History ==
The town of Saint-Papoul was founded during the 8th century when an abbey was established here, dedicated to Saint Papulus.

The diocese of Saint-Papoul, of which Saint-Papoul Cathedral was the center, was created an episcopal see by John XXII in 1317.

== Population ==
Historical population
Year	Pop.	±% p.a.
1968	617	—
1975	678	+1.36%
1982	673	−0.11%
1990	762	+1.56%
1999	770	+0.12%
2007	779	+0.15%
2012	760	−0.49%
2017	835	+1.90%
2023	835	+0.00%
Source: INSEE

== Literature ==
Saint-Papoul is a location mentioned briefly in the M.R. James short ghost story Canon Alberic's Scrap-Book published in Ghost Stories of an Antiquary in 1904

== See also ==
- Communes of the Aude department
