= Peyrens =

Commune in Occitanie, France

- Commune
- Coat of arms
- Location of Peyrens
- Location within France Location within Occitanie
- Coordinates: 43°21′45″N 1°57′38″E
- Country: France
- Region: Occitania
- Department: Aude
- Arrondissement: Carcassonne
- Canton: Le Bassin chaurien

Government
  - Mayor (2020–2026): Hubert Charrier
- Area^{1}: 4.77 km^{2} (1.84 sq mi)
- Elevation: 190 m (620 ft)
- Highest elevation: 221 m (725 ft)
- Lowest elevation: 159 m (522 ft)
- Population (2023): 454
  - Density: 95.2/km^{2} (247/sq mi)
- Time zone: UTC+01:00 (CET)
  - Summer (DST): UTC+02:00 (CEST)
- INSEE/Postal code: 11284 /11400
- ^{1} French Land Register data, which excludes lakes, ponds, glaciers > 1 km^{2} (0.386 sq mi or 247 acres) and river estuaries.

Peyrens is a commune in the Aude department in southern France.

== Population ==
Historical population
Year	Pop.	±% p.a.
1968	241	—
1975	235	−0.36%
1982	267	+1.84%
1990	301	+1.51%
1999	351	+1.72%
2007	405	+1.80%
2012	480	+3.46%
2017	496	+0.66%
2023	454	−1.46%
Source: INSEE

== See also ==
- Communes of the Aude department
