= Souilhe =

Commune in Occitanie, France

- Commune
- Coat of arms
- Location of Souilhe
- Location within France Location within Occitanie
- Coordinates: 43°22′15″N 1°54′51″E
- Country: France
- Region: Occitania
- Department: Aude
- Arrondissement: Carcassonne
- Canton: Le Bassin chaurien
- Intercommunality: Castelnaudary Lauragais Audois

Government
  - Mayor (2020–2026): Raymond Veland
- Area^{1}: 4.20 km^{2} (1.62 sq mi)
- Elevation: 195 m (640 ft)
- Highest elevation: 207 m (679 ft)
- Lowest elevation: 159 m (522 ft)
- Population (2023): 354
  - Density: 84.3/km^{2} (218/sq mi)
- Time zone: UTC+01:00 (CET)
  - Summer (DST): UTC+02:00 (CEST)
- INSEE/Postal code: 11383 /11400
- ^{1} French Land Register data, which excludes lakes, ponds, glaciers > 1 km^{2} (0.386 sq mi or 247 acres) and river estuaries.

Souilhe (French pronunciation: [suj]; Occitan: Solha) is a commune in the Aude department in southern France.

== Population ==
Historical population
Year	Pop.	±% p.a.
1968	112	—
1975	86	−3.70%
1982	112	+3.85%
1990	204	+7.78%
1999	238	+1.73%
2007	309	+3.32%
2012	320	+0.70%
2017	319	−0.06%
2023	354	+1.75%
Source: INSEE

== See also ==
- Communes of the Aude department
