= La Pomarède =

Commune in Occitanie, France

- Commune
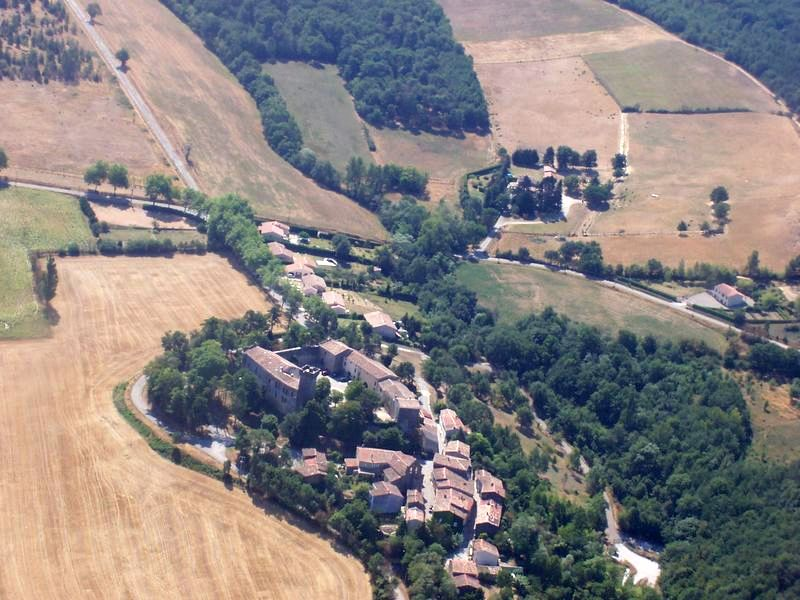
- An aerial view of La Pomarède

- Coat of arms
- Location of La Pomarède
- Location within France Location within Occitanie
- Coordinates: 43°24′20″N 1°57′03″E
- Country: France
- Region: Occitania
- Department: Aude
- Arrondissement: Carcassonne
- Canton: Le Bassin chaurien

Government
  - Mayor (2020–2026): Nadine Rostoll
- Area^{1}: 13.08 km^{2} (5.05 sq mi)
- Elevation: 243 m (797 ft)
- Highest elevation: 375 m (1,230 ft)
- Lowest elevation: 188 m (617 ft)
- Population (2023): 188
  - Density: 14.4/km^{2} (37.2/sq mi)
- Time zone: UTC+01:00 (CET)
  - Summer (DST): UTC+02:00 (CEST)
- INSEE/Postal code: 11292 /11400
- ^{1} French Land Register data, which excludes lakes, ponds, glaciers > 1 km^{2} (0.386 sq mi or 247 acres) and river estuaries.

La Pomarède (French pronunciation: [la pɔmaʁɛd]; Occitan: La Pomareda) is a commune in the Aude department in southern France. La Pomarède is centred on a partially preserved Cathar chateau (castle) which is now the property of the commune. The chateau contains the Maire (town hall), a post office and small library, a primary school, and a privately owned hotel and restaurant. There is also a parish church (Roman Catholic) and cemetery in the commune. Self-catering accommodation is available in gites a few minutes' walk from the chateau.

The major nearby towns are Castelnaudary (a garrison town, also in the Department of Aude) and Revel (in the neighbouring Department of Haute Garonne), both about twenty minutes' drive away.

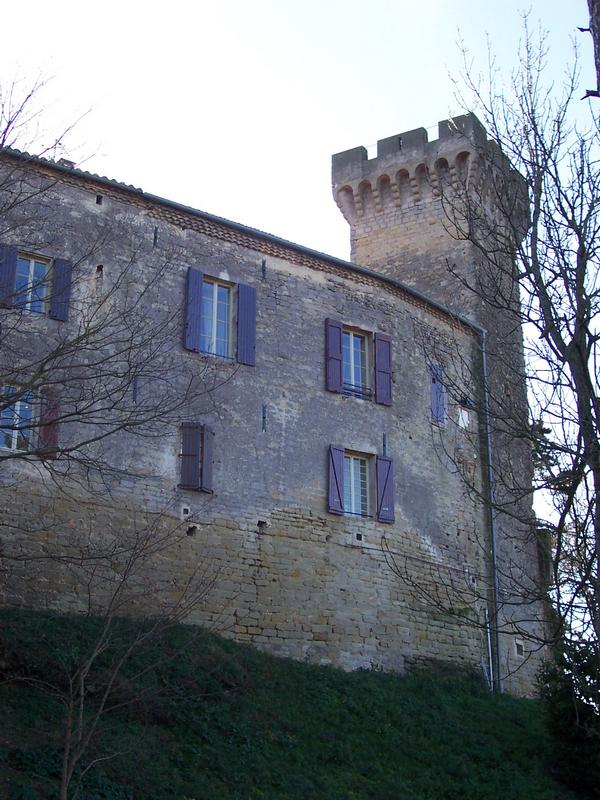
La Pomarède castle

== Population ==
Historical population
Year	Pop.	±% p.a.
1968	175	—
1975	174	−0.08%
1982	165	−0.76%
1990	163	−0.15%
1999	158	−0.35%
2007	166	+0.62%
2012	162	−0.49%
2017	143	−2.46%
2023	188	+4.67%
Source: INSEE

== See also ==
- Communes of the Aude department
