= Canton of Le Bassin chaurien =

Coordinates: 43.32°N 1.95°E

- Canton
- Situation of the canton of Le Bassin chaurien in the department of Aude
- Country: France
- Region: Occitania
- Department: Aude
- No. of communes: {{{nbcomm}}}
- Population (2023): 23,598
- INSEE code: 1105

The canton of Le Bassin chaurien is an administrative division of the Aude department, southern France. It was created at the French canton reorganisation which came into effect in March 2015. Its seat is in Castelnaudary.

It consists of the following communes:

1. Airoux
2. Les Cassés
3. Castelnaudary
4. Fendeille
5. Issel
6. Labastide-d'Anjou
7. Lasbordes
8. Mas-Saintes-Puelles
9. Montferrand
10. Montmaur
11. Peyrens
12. La Pomarède
13. Puginier
14. Ricaud
15. Saint-Martin-Lalande
16. Saint-Papoul
17. Saint-Paulet
18. Souilhanels
19. Souilhe
20. Soupex
21. Tréville
22. Villeneuve-la-Comptal
