= Puginier =

Commune in Occitanie, France

- Commune
- Coat of arms
- Location of Puginier
- Location within France Location within Occitanie
- Coordinates: 43°22′41″N 1°55′45″E
- Country: France
- Region: Occitania
- Department: Aude
- Arrondissement: Carcassonne
- Canton: Le Bassin chaurien

Government
  - Mayor (2020–2026): Jérôme Senal
- Area^{1}: 6.78 km^{2} (2.62 sq mi)
- Elevation: 200 m (660 ft)
- Highest elevation: 237 m (778 ft)
- Lowest elevation: 168 m (551 ft)
- Population (2023): 153
  - Density: 22.6/km^{2} (58.4/sq mi)
- Time zone: UTC+01:00 (CET)
  - Summer (DST): UTC+02:00 (CEST)
- INSEE/Postal code: 11300 /11400
- ^{1} French Land Register data, which excludes lakes, ponds, glaciers > 1 km^{2} (0.386 sq mi or 247 acres) and river estuaries.

Puginier (French pronunciation: [pyʒinje]; Occitan: Puginièr) is a commune in the Aude department in southern France.

== Population ==
Historical population
Year	Pop.	±% p.a.
1968	148	—
1975	154	+0.57%
1982	118	−3.73%
1990	145	+2.61%
1999	147	+0.15%
2007	144	−0.26%
2012	154	+1.35%
2017	152	−0.26%
2023	153	+0.11%
Source: INSEE

== See also ==
- Communes of the Aude department
