= Souilhanels =

Place in Occitanie, France

- Coat of arms
- Location of Souilhanels
- Location within France Location within Occitanie
- Coordinates: 43°21′06″N 1°55′09″E
- Country: France
- Region: Occitania
- Department: Aude
- Arrondissement: Carcassonne
- Canton: Le Bassin chaurien

Government
  - Mayor (2020–2026): Didier Maerten
- Area^{1}: 2.72 km^{2} (1.05 sq mi)
- Elevation: 158 m (518 ft)
- Highest elevation: 194 m (636 ft)
- Lowest elevation: 155 m (509 ft)
- Population (2023): 356
  - Density: 131/km^{2} (339/sq mi)
- Time zone: UTC+01:00 (CET)
  - Summer (DST): UTC+02:00 (CEST)
- INSEE/Postal code: 11382 /11400
- ^{1} French Land Register data, which excludes lakes, ponds, glaciers > 1 km^{2} (0.386 sq mi or 247 acres) and river estuaries.

Souilhanels (French pronunciation: [sujanɛl]; Occitan: Solhanèls) is a commune in the Aude department in southern France.

== Population ==
Historical population
Year	Pop.	±% p.a.
1968	147	—
1975	103	−4.95%
1982	132	+3.61%
1990	197	+5.13%
1999	253	+2.82%
2007	375	+5.04%
2012	376	+0.05%
2017	365	−0.59%
2023	356	−0.42%
Source: INSEE

== See also ==
- Communes of the Aude department
