= Lasbordes, Aude =

Commune in Occitanie, France

Lasbordes
- Commune
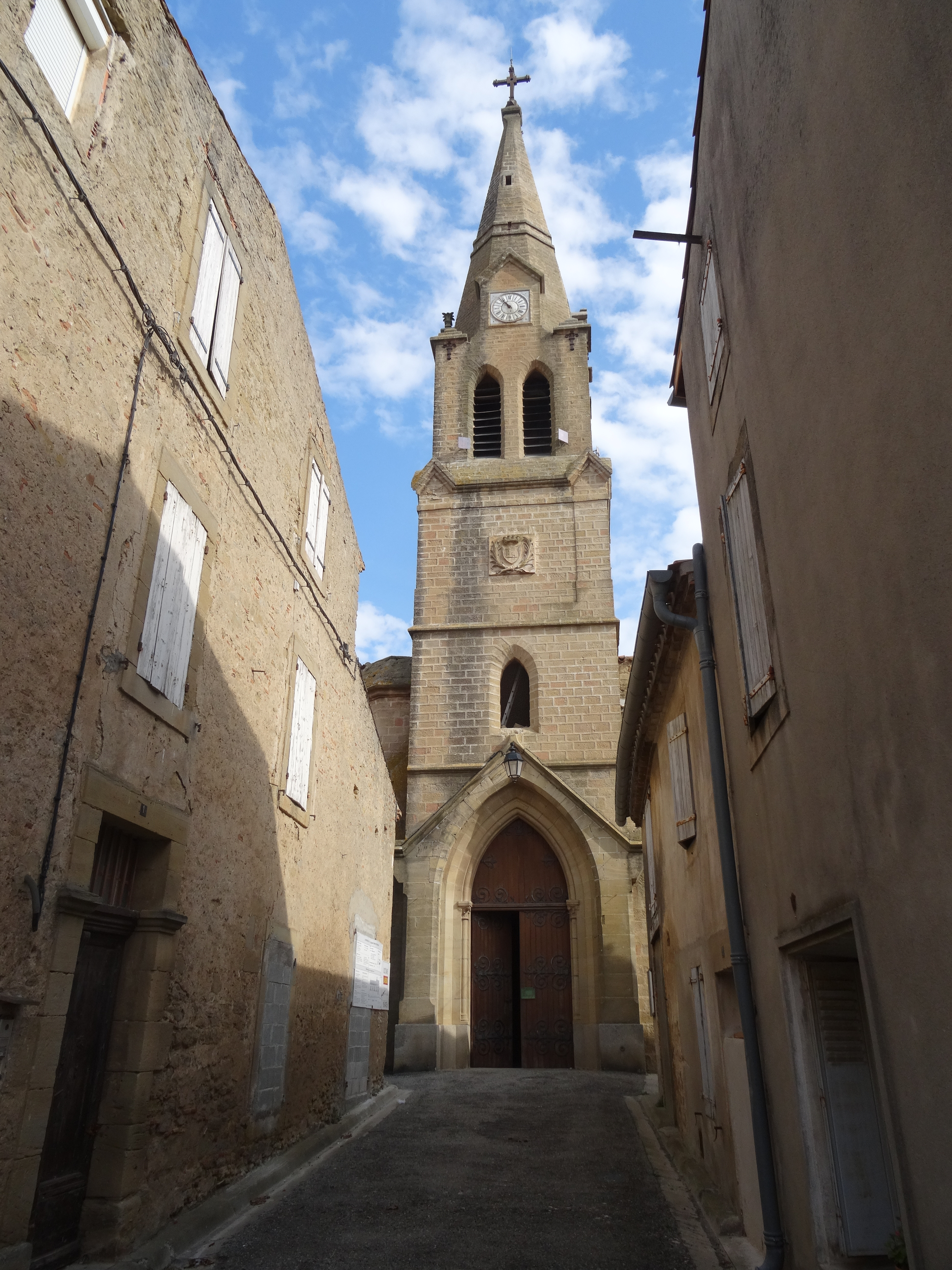
- The church in Lasbordes

- Coat of arms
- Location of Lasbordes
- Location within France Location within Occitanie
- Coordinates: 43°17′45″N 2°02′48″E
- Country: France
- Region: Occitania
- Department: Aude
- Arrondissement: Carcassonne
- Canton: Le Bassin chaurien

Government
  - Mayor (2020–2026): Jean-Pierre Quaglieri
- Area^{1}: 14.74 km^{2} (5.69 sq mi)
- Elevation: 115 m (377 ft)
- Highest elevation: 205 m (673 ft)
- Lowest elevation: 131 m (430 ft)
- Population (2023): 846
  - Density: 57.4/km^{2} (149/sq mi)
- Time zone: UTC+01:00 (CET)
  - Summer (DST): UTC+02:00 (CEST)
- INSEE/Postal code: 11192 /11400
- ^{1} French Land Register data, which excludes lakes, ponds, glaciers > 1 km^{2} (0.386 sq mi or 247 acres) and river estuaries.

Lasbordes (French pronunciation: [lasbɔʁd]; Occitan: Las Bòrdas) is a commune in the Aude department in southern France. The village is known for its church : Saint-Christophe, classed as historical monument since July 26, 1988.

The Terreal company has a plant in the center of Lasbordes for the fabrication of bricks.

The village provides some infrastructures to its population with a public school, a small market, a soccer field and a city stadium.

== Population ==
Historical population
Year	Pop.	±% p.a.
1968	520	—
1975	539	+0.51%
1982	584	+1.15%
1990	657	+1.48%
1999	689	+0.53%
2007	818	+2.17%
2012	799	−0.47%
2017	788	−0.28%
2023	846	+1.19%
Source: INSEE

== See also ==
- Communes of the Aude department
