= Laurac =

Commune in Occitanie, France

- Commune
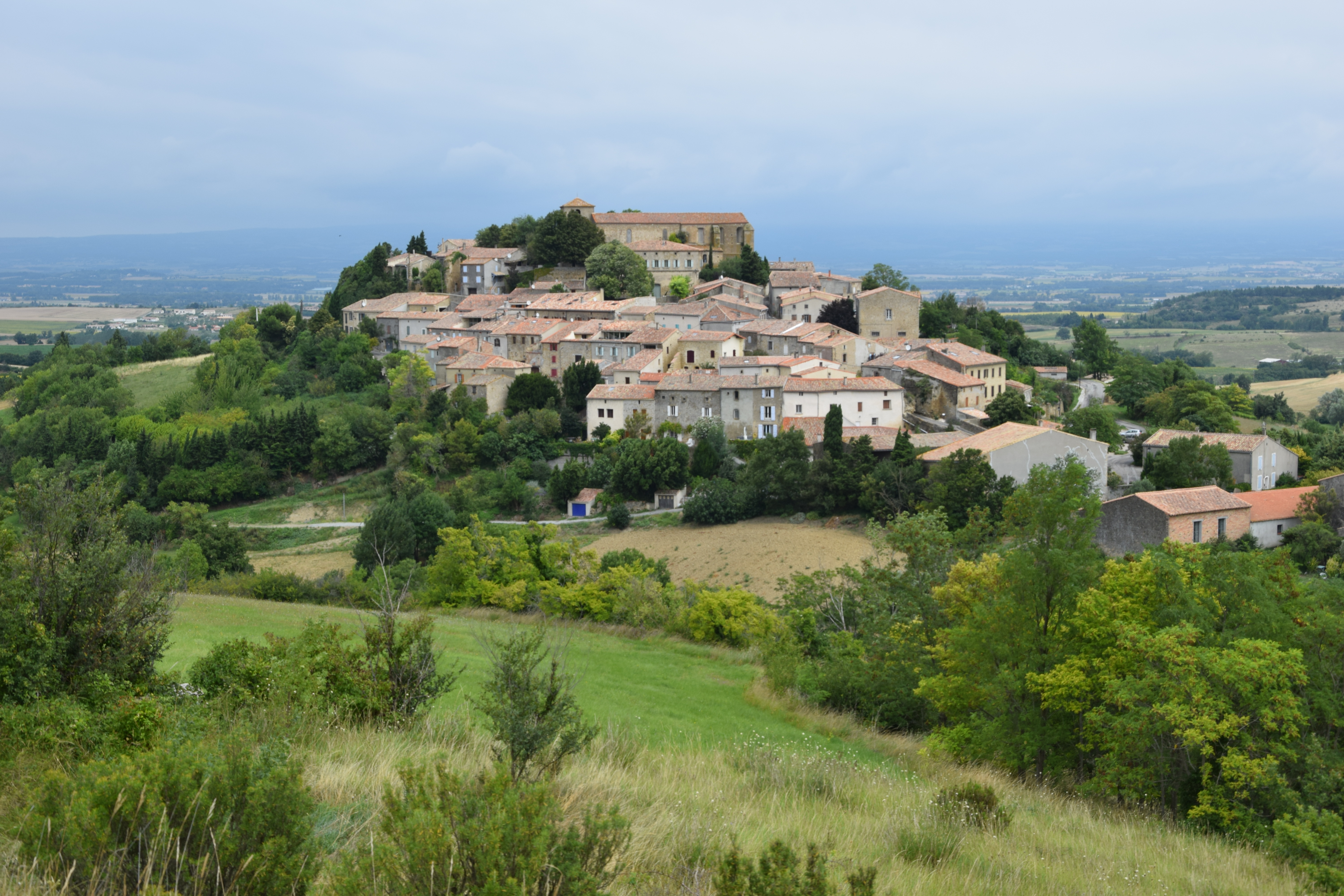
- The church and surroundings in Laurac

- Coat of arms
- Location of Laurac
- Location within France Location within Occitanie
- Coordinates: 43°14′00″N 1°59′00″E
- Country: France
- Region: Occitania
- Department: Aude
- Arrondissement: Carcassonne
- Canton: La Piège au Razès

Government
  - Mayor (2020–2026): Yolande Steenkeste
- Area^{1}: 1.158 km^{2} (0.447 sq mi)
- Elevation: 410 m (1,350 ft)
- Highest elevation: 413 m (1,355 ft)
- Lowest elevation: 196 m (643 ft)
- Population (2023): 182
  - Density: 157/km^{2} (407/sq mi)
- Time zone: UTC+01:00 (CET)
  - Summer (DST): UTC+02:00 (CEST)
- INSEE/Postal code: 11196 /11270
- ^{1} French Land Register data, which excludes lakes, ponds, glaciers > 1 km^{2} (0.386 sq mi or 247 acres) and river estuaries.

Laurac (French pronunciation: [loʁak]; Occitan: Laurac) is a commune in the Aude department in southern France.

== Population ==
Historical population
Year	Pop.	±% p.a.
1968	153	—
1975	123	−3.07%
1982	118	−0.59%
1990	140	+2.16%
1999	124	−1.34%
2007	159	+3.16%
2012	180	+2.51%
2017	175	−0.56%
2023	182	+0.66%
Source: INSEE

== See also ==
- Communes of the Aude department
- List of medieval bridges in France
