= Mas-Saintes-Puelles =

Commune in Occitanie, France

- Commune
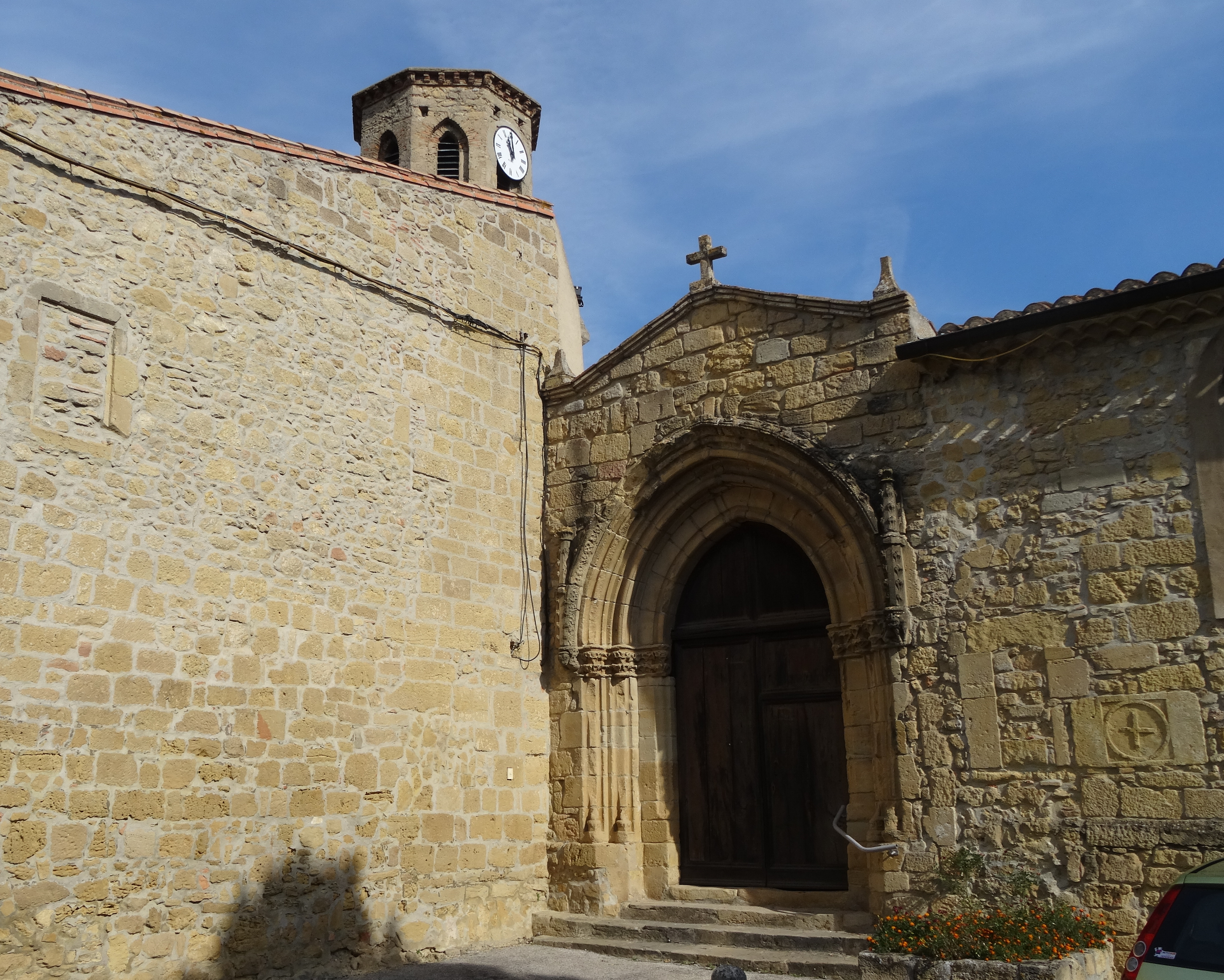
- The church in Mas-Saintes-Puelles

- Coat of arms
- Location of Mas-Saintes-Puelles
- Location within France Location within Occitanie
- Coordinates: 43°18′51″N 1°52′39″E
- Country: France
- Region: Occitania
- Department: Aude
- Arrondissement: Carcassonne
- Canton: Le Bassin chaurien
- Intercommunality: Castelnaudary Lauragais Audois

Government
  - Mayor (2020–2026): Isabelle Siau
- Area^{1}: 27.63 km^{2} (10.67 sq mi)
- Elevation: 178 m (584 ft)
- Highest elevation: 324 m (1,063 ft)
- Lowest elevation: 164 m (538 ft)
- Population (2023): 923
  - Density: 33.4/km^{2} (86.5/sq mi)
- Time zone: UTC+01:00 (CET)
  - Summer (DST): UTC+02:00 (CEST)
- INSEE/Postal code: 11225 /11400
- ^{1} French Land Register data, which excludes lakes, ponds, glaciers > 1 km^{2} (0.386 sq mi or 247 acres) and river estuaries.

Mas-Saintes-Puelles (French pronunciation: [mas sɛ̃t pɥɛl]; Occitan: Mas Santas Puèlas) is a commune in the Aude department in southern France.

== Population ==
Historical population
Year	Pop.	±% p.a.
1968	682	—
1975	617	−1.42%
1982	640	+0.52%
1990	720	+1.48%
1999	805	+1.25%
2007	889	+1.25%
2012	898	+0.20%
2017	922	+0.53%
2023	923	+0.02%
Source: INSEE

== See also ==
- Communes of the Aude department
