= Saint-Papoul Cathedral =

Church located in Aude, France

Coordinates: 43°19′49″N 2°2′2″E

Saint-Papoul Cathedral Cathédrale Saint-Papoul de Saint-Papoul
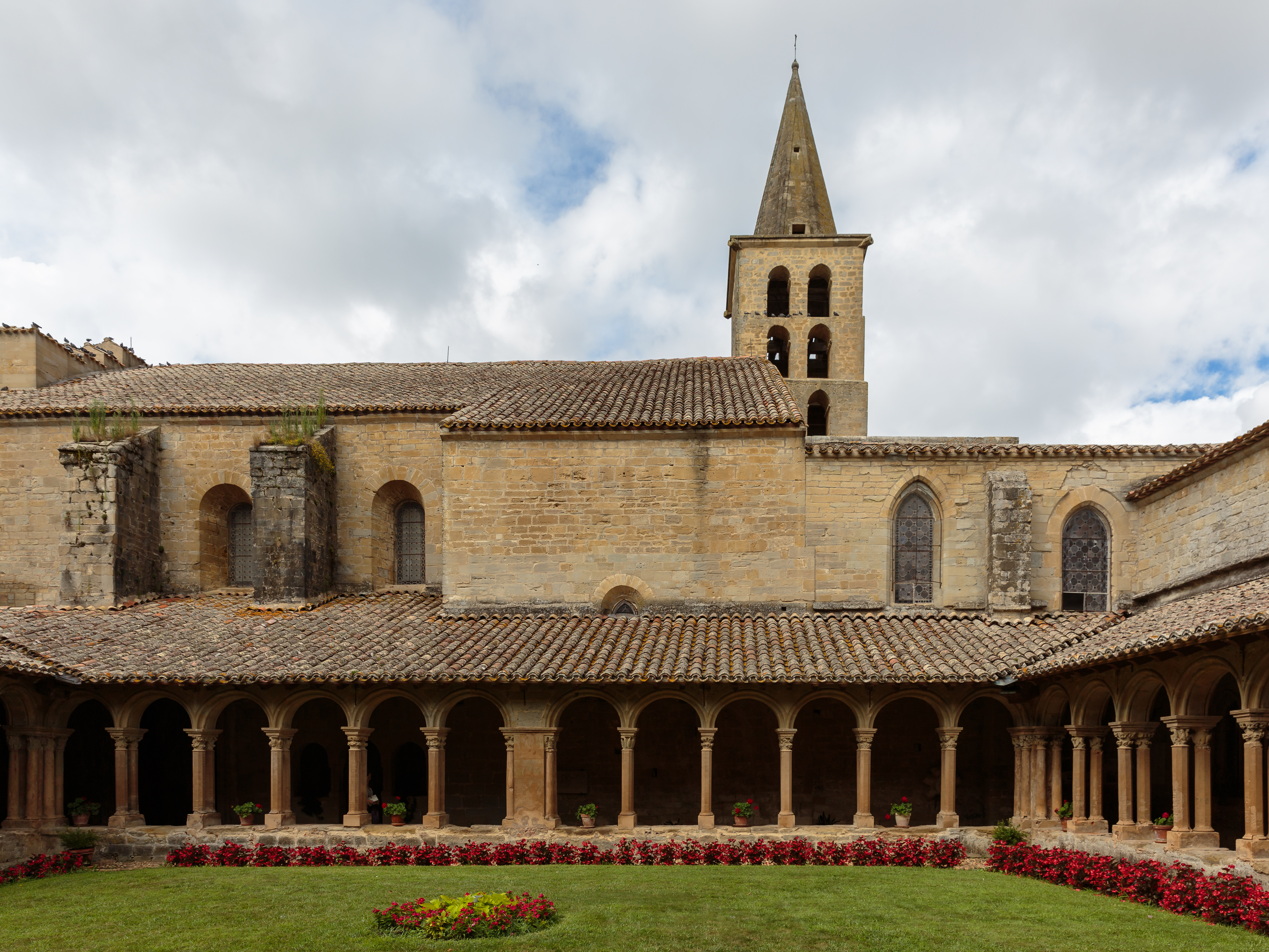
- Saint-Papoul Cathedral

Religion
- Affiliation: Roman Catholic Church
- Province: Bishop of Saint-Papoul
- Region: Languedoc
- Ecclesiastical or organisational status: Cathedral
- Status: Active

Location
- Location: Saint-Papoul, France
- Interactive map of Saint-Papoul Cathedral; Cathédrale Saint-Papoul de Saint-Papoul

Architecture
- Type: church
- Groundbreaking: 8th century
- Completed: 18th century

Saint-Papoul Cathedral (French: Cathédrale Saint-Papoul de Saint-Papoul) was a Roman Catholic church located in the village of Saint-Papoul in Languedoc. The cathedral is dedicated to Saint Papulus (French: Papoul), an early Christian bishop and martyr, from whom the settlement also took its name.

It was the seat of the Bishop of Saint-Papoul. This diocese, along with a number of others in the region, was created in 1317 in the aftermath of the suppression of the Albigensians. The Abbey of Saint-Papoul had been founded here in the 8th century, and in 1317 the abbot was elevated to the status of bishop, and the abbey church to that of cathedral.

The diocese and the abbey were suppressed during the French Revolution and the diocese was abolished under the Concordat of 1801, its territory being transferred almost entirely to the Diocese of Carcassonne. The abbey buildings remain and the cathedral / abbey church has become the parish church of the village of Saint-Papoul.

== History ==
The abbey was founded in the eighth century. Its name comes from Saint Papoul, a hermit from the 5th or 6th century. He was martyred and shaken at the place called "L'Ermitage". According to legend, he bent down and picked up the top of his skull.

The monk Saint Berenger lived there in the 11th century and his tomb became a place of pilgrimage.

In 1317, Pope John XXII created the bishopric of Saint-Papoul, and the abbey church became the cathedral. 34 bishops succeeded one another until the Revolution occurred in year 1361, as a result, the cathedral was plundered by the Routiers and in 1595 by the Protestants.

In the 17th and 18th centuries, the abbey underwent important restorations and the episcopal palace was rebuilt. In 1790, the cathedral maintained a small body of music for the service of worship, formed by an organist, a cantor who also played the serpent and a choirboy.

During the Revolution, the bishopric was suppressed and the cathedral became a parish church.

== Sources ==
- Catholic Encyclopedia: Carcassonne, incl. Saint-Papoul
- Catholic Hierarchy: Diocese of Saint-Papoul
- Saint-Papoul Cathedral at The Planet's Cathedrals
