= Les Cassés =

Commune in Occitanie, France

- Commune
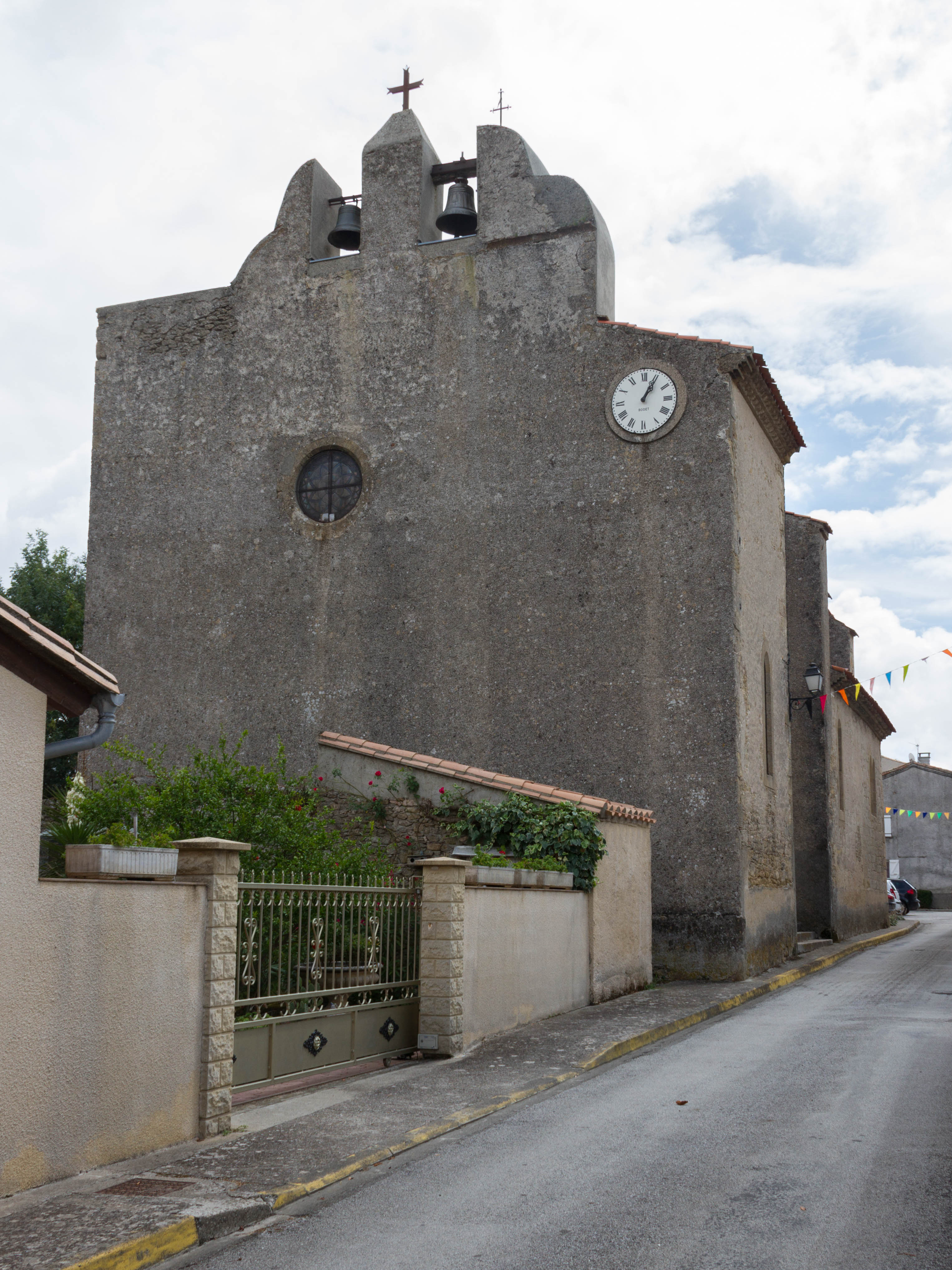
- The church in Les Cassés

- Coat of arms
- Location of Les Cassés
- Location within France Location within Occitanie
- Coordinates: 43°25′37″N 1°52′07″E
- Country: France
- Region: Occitania
- Department: Aude
- Arrondissement: Carcassonne
- Canton: Le Bassin chaurien
- Intercommunality: Castelnaudary Lauragais Audois

Government
  - Mayor (2020–2026): Nicolas Rauzy
- Area^{1}: 7.28 km^{2} (2.81 sq mi)
- Elevation: 220 m (720 ft)
- Highest elevation: 323 m (1,060 ft)
- Lowest elevation: 189 m (620 ft)
- Population (2023): 319
  - Density: 43.8/km^{2} (113/sq mi)
- Time zone: UTC+01:00 (CET)
  - Summer (DST): UTC+02:00 (CEST)
- INSEE/Postal code: 11074 /11320
- ^{1} French Land Register data, which excludes lakes, ponds, glaciers > 1 km^{2} (0.386 sq mi or 247 acres) and river estuaries.

Les Cassés (French pronunciation: [le kase]; Occitan: Les Casses) is a commune in the Aude department in southern France.

== Population ==
Historical population
Year	Pop.	±% p.a.
1968	171	—
1975	168	−0.25%
1982	183	+1.23%
1990	186	+0.20%
1999	174	−0.74%
2007	222	+3.09%
2012	255	+2.81%
2017	295	+2.96%
2023	319	+1.31%
Source: INSEE

== See also ==
- Communes of the Aude department
