= Soupex =

Commune in Occitania, France

- Commune
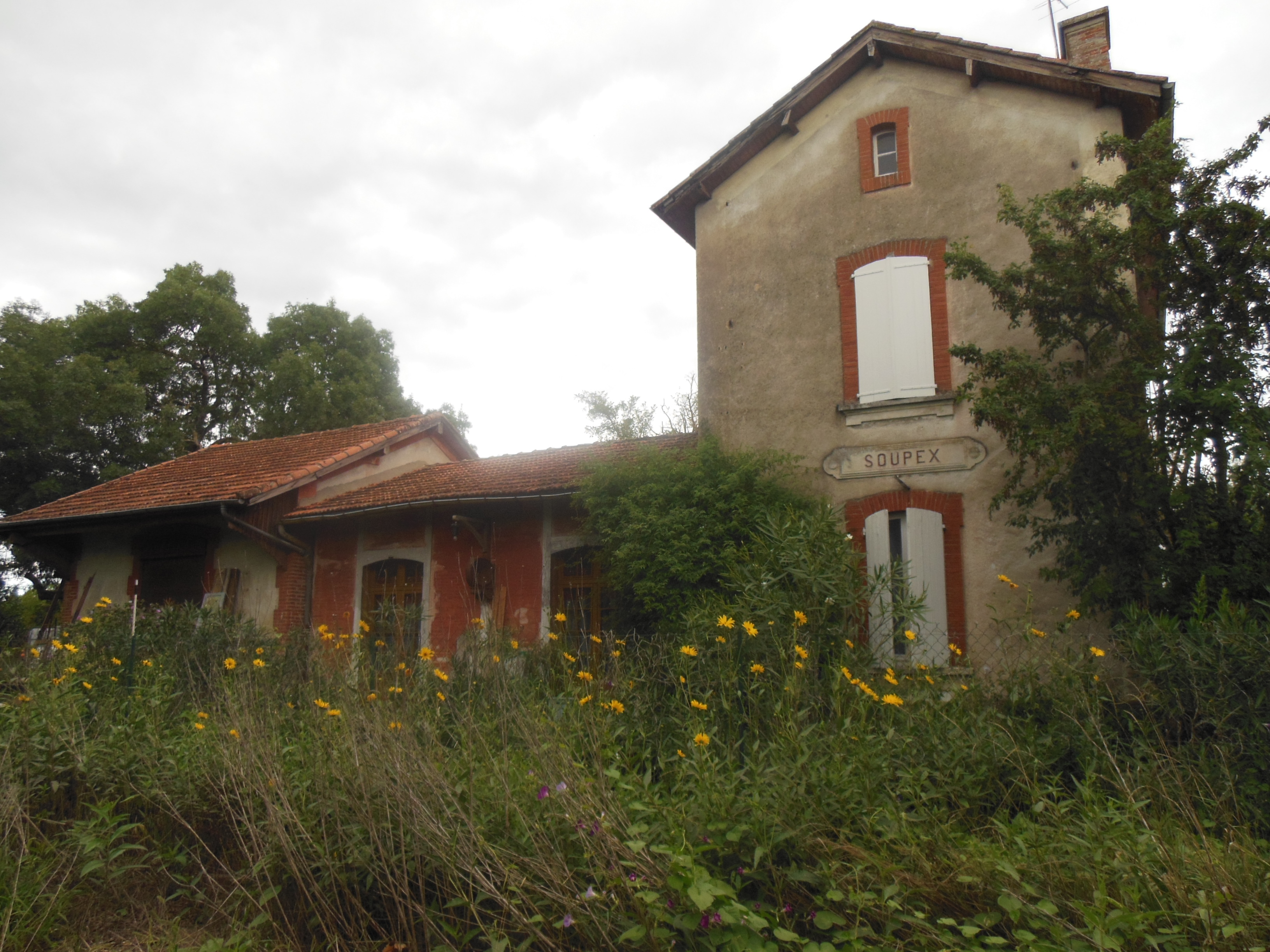
- The railway station in Soupex

- Coat of arms
- Location of Soupex
- Location within France Location within Occitanie
- Coordinates: 43°22′46″N 1°53′46″E
- Country: France
- Region: Occitania
- Department: Aude
- Arrondissement: Carcassonne
- Canton: Le Bassin chaurien

Government
  - Mayor (2023–2026): Severine Franc
- Area^{1}: 7.37 km^{2} (2.85 sq mi)
- Elevation: 134 m (440 ft)
- Highest elevation: 224 m (735 ft)
- Lowest elevation: 162 m (531 ft)
- Population (2023): 243
  - Density: 33.0/km^{2} (85.4/sq mi)
- Time zone: UTC+01:00 (CET)
  - Summer (DST): UTC+02:00 (CEST)
- INSEE/Postal code: 11385 /11320
- ^{1} French Land Register data, which excludes lakes, ponds, glaciers > 1 km^{2} (0.386 sq mi or 247 acres) and river estuaries.

Soupex (French pronunciation: [supɛks]; Occitan: Sopèrs) is a commune in the Aude department in southern France.

== Population ==
Historical population
Year	Pop.	±% p.a.
1968	245	—
1975	243	−0.12%
1982	234	−0.54%
1990	213	−1.17%
1999	225	+0.61%
2007	253	+1.48%
2012	259	+0.47%
2017	246	−1.02%
2023	243	−0.20%
Source: INSEE

== See also ==
- Communes of the Aude department
