= Montferrand, Aude =

Commune in Occitanie, France

Montferrand
- Commune
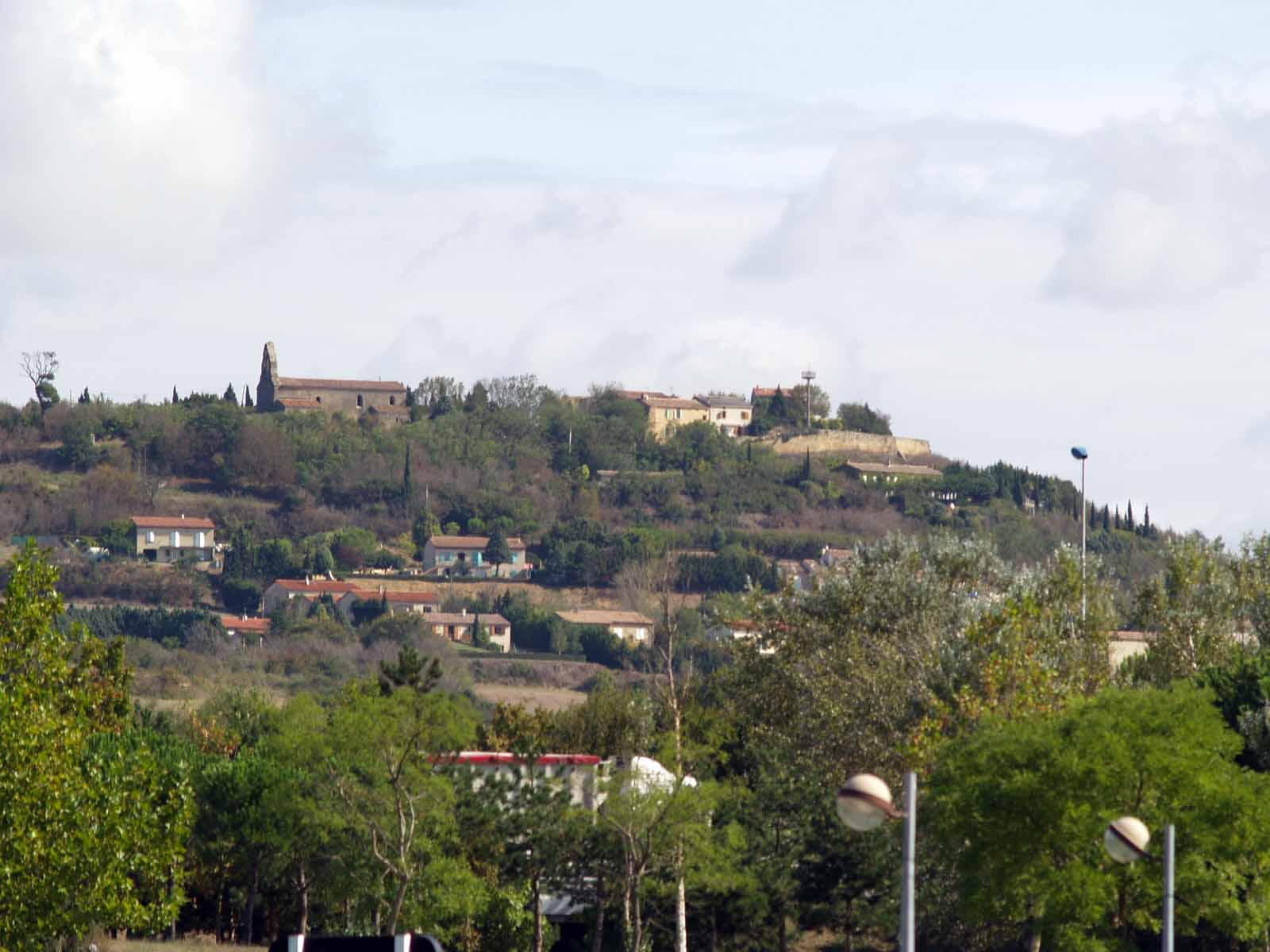
- A general view of Montferrand

- Coat of arms
- Location of Montferrand
- Location within France Location within Occitanie
- Coordinates: 43°21′55″N 1°49′12″E
- Country: France
- Region: Occitania
- Department: Aude
- Arrondissement: Carcassonne
- Canton: Le Bassin chaurien

Government
  - Mayor (2020–2026): Christophe Pradel
- Area^{1}: 17.93 km^{2} (6.92 sq mi)
- Elevation: 193 m (633 ft)
- Highest elevation: 301 m (988 ft)
- Lowest elevation: 186 m (610 ft)
- Population (2023): 622
  - Density: 34.7/km^{2} (89.8/sq mi)
- Time zone: UTC+01:00 (CET)
  - Summer (DST): UTC+02:00 (CEST)
- INSEE/Postal code: 11243 /11320
- ^{1} French Land Register data, which excludes lakes, ponds, glaciers > 1 km^{2} (0.386 sq mi or 247 acres) and river estuaries.

Montferrand (French pronunciation: [mɔ̃fɛʁɑ̃]) is a commune in the Aude department in southern France.

== Population ==
Historical population
Year	Pop.	±% p.a.
1968	438	—
1975	395	−1.47%
1982	352	−1.63%
1990	356	+0.14%
1999	410	+1.58%
2007	477	+1.91%
2012	515	+1.54%
2017	565	+1.87%
2023	622	+1.61%
Source: INSEE

== See also ==
- Communes of the Aude department
