= Tréville =

Commune in Occitanie, France

- Commune
- Coat of arms
- Location of Tréville
- Location within France Location within Occitanie
- Coordinates: 43°23′09″N 1°57′12″E
- Country: France
- Region: Occitania
- Department: Aude
- Arrondissement: Carcassonne
- Canton: Le Bassin chaurien

Government
  - Mayor (2020–2026): Veronique Corroir
- Area^{1}: 5.33 km^{2} (2.06 sq mi)
- Elevation: 250 m (820 ft)
- Highest elevation: 311 m (1,020 ft)
- Lowest elevation: 178 m (584 ft)
- Population (2023): 110
  - Density: 21/km^{2} (53/sq mi)
- Time zone: UTC+01:00 (CET)
  - Summer (DST): UTC+02:00 (CEST)
- INSEE/Postal code: 11399 /11400
- ^{1} French Land Register data, which excludes lakes, ponds, glaciers > 1 km^{2} (0.386 sq mi or 247 acres) and river estuaries.

Tréville (French pronunciation: [tʁevil]; Occitan: Trevila) is a commune in the Aude department in southern France.

== Population ==
Historical population
Year	Pop.	±% p.a.
1968	76	—
1975	76	+0.00%
1982	80	+0.74%
1990	91	+1.62%
1999	117	+2.83%
2007	112	−0.54%
2012	105	−1.28%
2017	104	−0.19%
2023	110	+0.94%
Source: INSEE

== See also ==
- Communes of the Aude department
