= Saint-Michel-de-Lanès =

Commune in Occitanie, France

- Commune
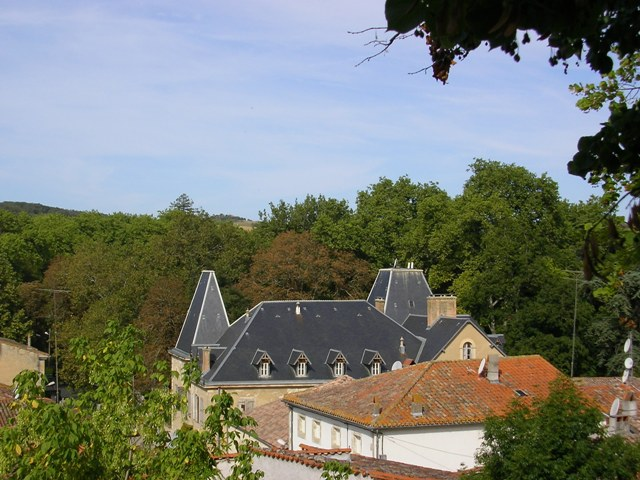
- The chateau in Saint-Michel-de-Lanès

- Coat of arms
- Location of Saint-Michel-de-Lanès
- Location within France Location within Occitanie
- Coordinates: 43°19′32″N 1°45′32″E
- Country: France
- Region: Occitania
- Department: Aude
- Arrondissement: Carcassonne
- Canton: La Piège au Razès

Government
  - Mayor (2020–2026): Thierry Leguevaques
- Area^{1}: 13.03 km^{2} (5.03 sq mi)
- Elevation: 202 m (663 ft)
- Highest elevation: 302 m (991 ft)
- Lowest elevation: 189 m (620 ft)
- Population (2023): 484
  - Density: 37.1/km^{2} (96.2/sq mi)
- Time zone: UTC+01:00 (CET)
  - Summer (DST): UTC+02:00 (CEST)
- INSEE/Postal code: 11359 /11410
- ^{1} French Land Register data, which excludes lakes, ponds, glaciers > 1 km^{2} (0.386 sq mi or 247 acres) and river estuaries.

Saint-Michel-de-Lanès (French pronunciation: [sɛ̃ miʃɛl də lanɛs]; Occitan: Sant Miquèl) is a commune in the Aude department in southern France.

== Population ==
Historical population
Year	Pop.	±% p.a.
1968	302	—
1975	250	−2.66%
1982	228	−1.31%
1990	232	+0.22%
1999	283	+2.23%
2007	335	+2.13%
2012	381	+2.61%
2017	464	+4.02%
2023	484	+0.71%
Source: INSEE

== See also ==
- Communes of the Aude department
