= Ricaud, Aude =

Commune in Occitanie, France

Ricaud
- Commune
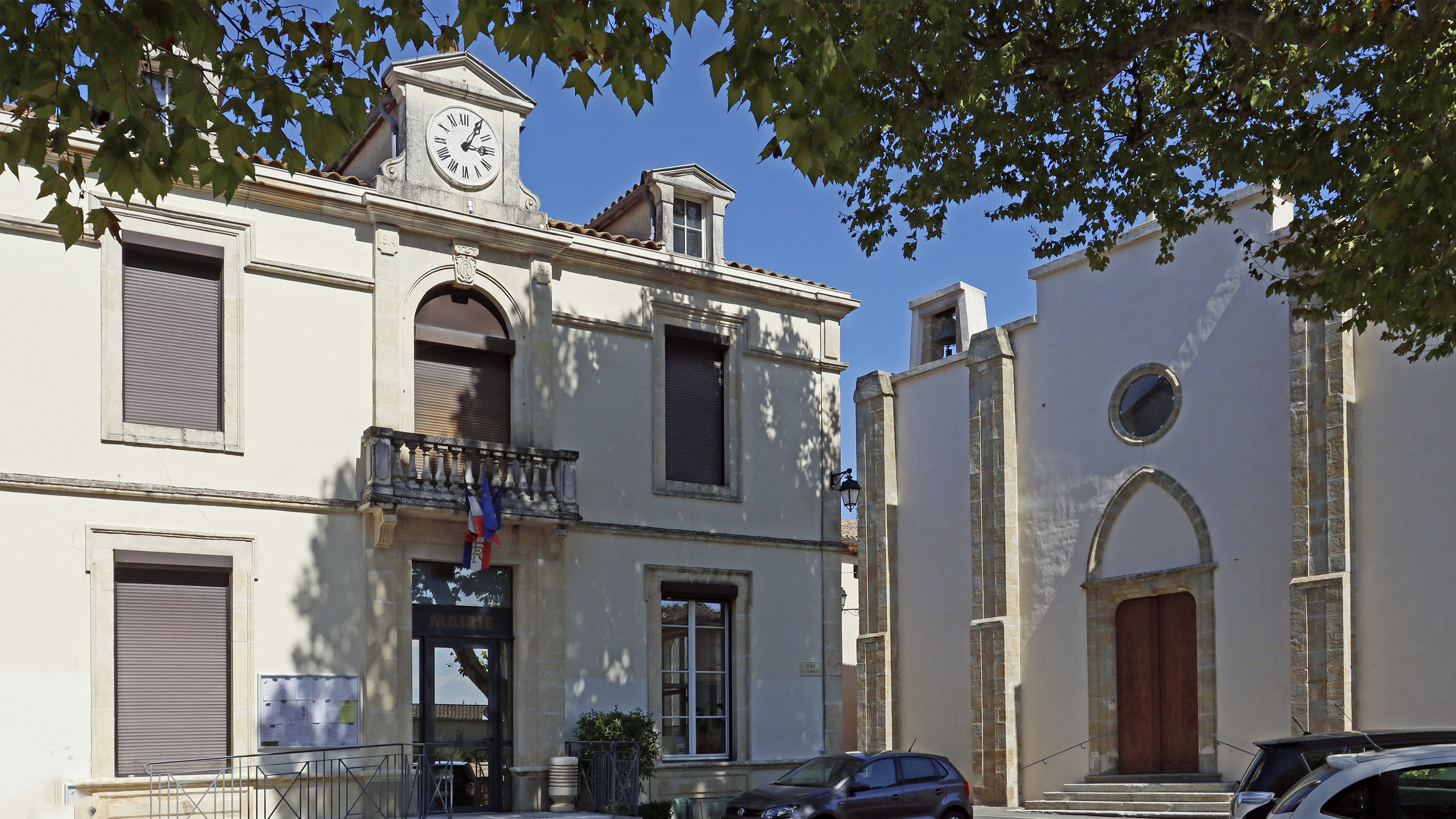
- Ricaud Town hall

- Coat of arms
- Location of Ricaud
- Location within France Location within Occitanie
- Coordinates: 43°20′48″N 1°53′30″E
- Country: France
- Region: Occitania
- Department: Aude
- Arrondissement: Carcassonne
- Canton: Le Bassin chaurien
- Intercommunality: Castelnaudary Lauragais Audois

Government
  - Mayor (2020–2026): Nicole Martin
- Area^{1}: 5.92 km^{2} (2.29 sq mi)
- Elevation: 179 m (587 ft)
- Highest elevation: 204 m (669 ft)
- Lowest elevation: 165 m (541 ft)
- Population (2023): 331
  - Density: 55.9/km^{2} (145/sq mi)
- Time zone: UTC+01:00 (CET)
  - Summer (DST): UTC+02:00 (CEST)
- INSEE/Postal code: 11313 /11400
- ^{1} French Land Register data, which excludes lakes, ponds, glaciers > 1 km^{2} (0.386 sq mi or 247 acres) and river estuaries.

Ricaud (French pronunciation: [ʁiko]) is a commune in the Aude department in southern France.

== Population ==
Historical population
Year	Pop.	±% p.a.
1968	185	—
1975	150	−2.95%
1982	187	+3.20%
1990	245	+3.43%
1999	242	−0.14%
2007	279	+1.79%
2012	307	+1.93%
2017	299	−0.53%
2023	331	+1.71%
Source: INSEE

== See also ==
- Communes of the Aude department
