= Labastide-d'Anjou =

Commune in Occitanie, France

Labastide-d'Anjou La Bastida d'Anjau (Occitan)
- Commune
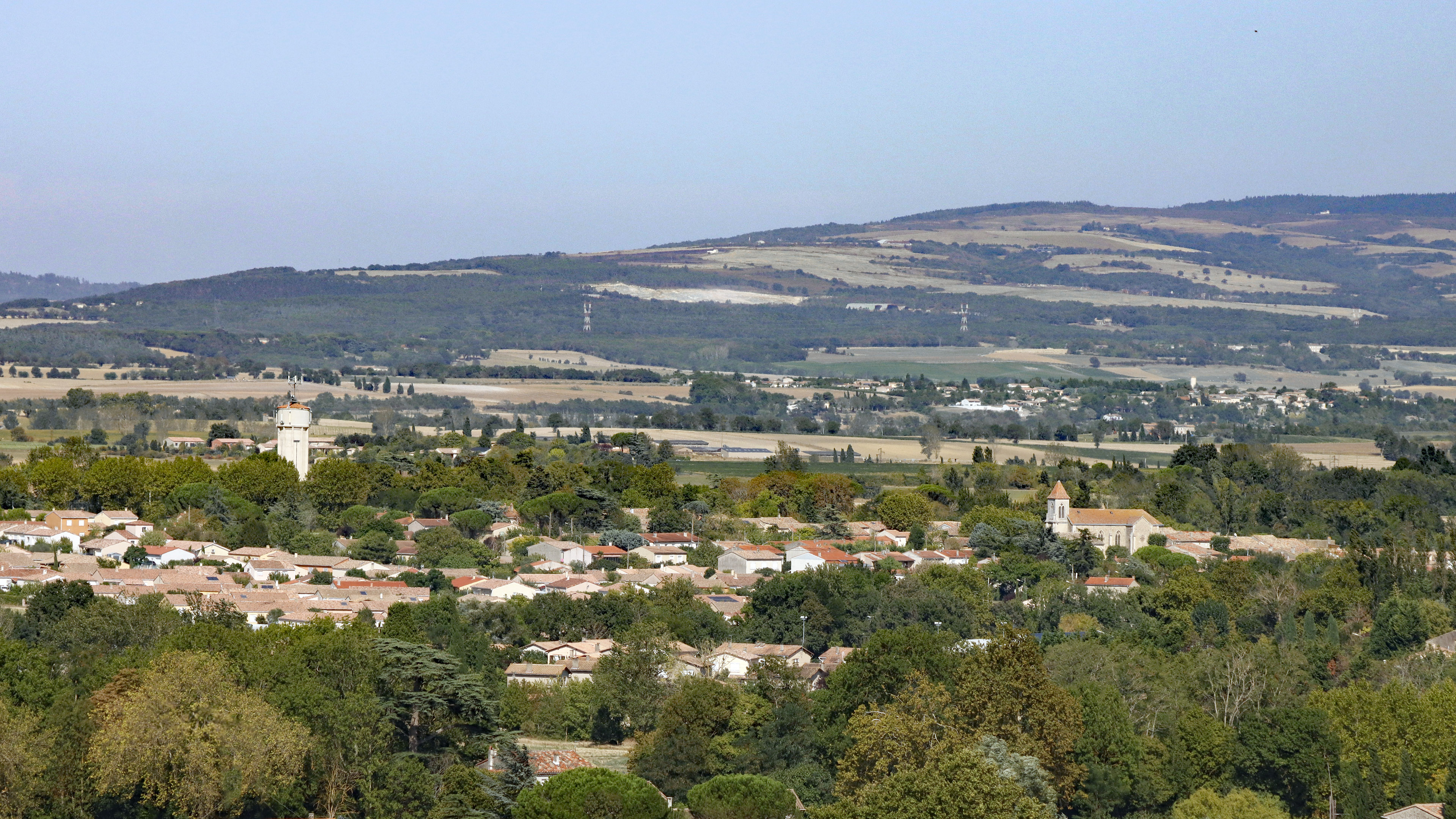
- The village of Labastide-d'Anjou seen from the south

- Coat of arms
- Location of Labastide-d'Anjou
- Location within France Location within Occitanie
- Coordinates: 43°20′51″N 1°51′08″E
- Country: France
- Region: Occitania
- Department: Aude
- Arrondissement: Carcassonne
- Canton: Le Bassin chaurien
- Intercommunality: Castelnaudary Lauragais Audois

Government
  - Mayor (2020–2026): Nathalie Naccache
- Area^{1}: 8.57 km^{2} (3.31 sq mi)
- Elevation: 286 m (938 ft)
- Highest elevation: 253 m (830 ft)
- Lowest elevation: 165 m (541 ft)
- Population (2023): 1,255
  - Density: 146/km^{2} (379/sq mi)
- Time zone: UTC+01:00 (CET)
  - Summer (DST): UTC+02:00 (CEST)
- INSEE/Postal code: 11178 /11320
- ^{1} French Land Register data, which excludes lakes, ponds, glaciers > 1 km^{2} (0.386 sq mi or 247 acres) and river estuaries.

Labastide-d'Anjou (French pronunciation: [labastid dɑ̃ʒu]; Occitan: La Bastida d'Anjau) is a commune in the Aude department in the Occitania region in Southern France.

== Demographics ==
Historical population
Year	Pop.	±% p.a.
1968	766	—
1975	747	−0.36%
1982	825	+1.43%
1990	797	−0.43%
1999	889	+1.22%
2007	896	+0.10%
2012	1,096	+4.11%
2017	1,326	+3.88%
2023	1,255	−0.91%
Source: INSEE

== See also ==
- Communes of the Aude department
