= Montmaur, Aude =

Commune in Occitanie, France

Montmaur
- Commune
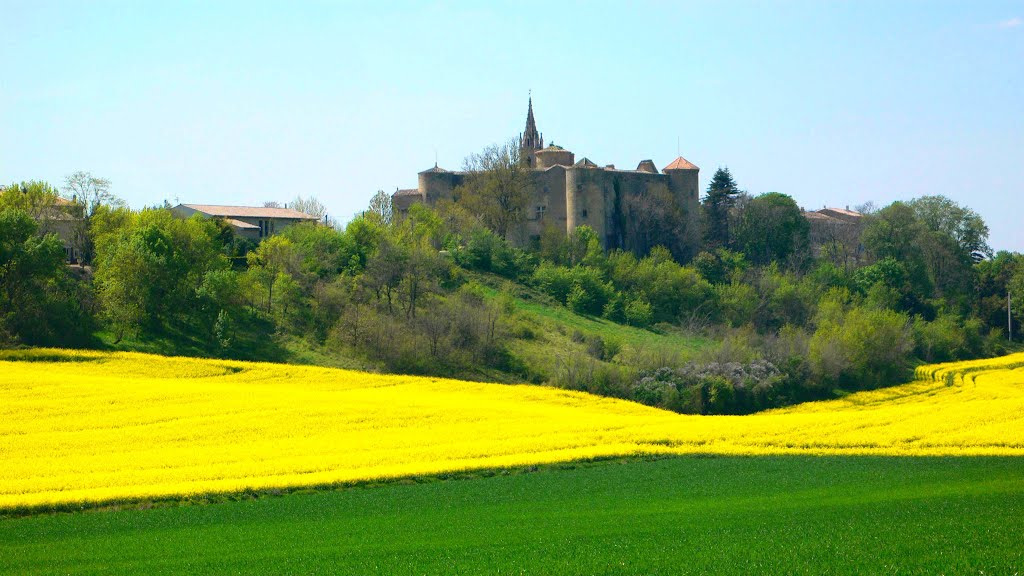
- A general view of Montmaur

- Coat of arms
- Location of Montmaur
- Location within France Location within Occitanie
- Coordinates: 43°23′40″N 1°50′41″E
- Country: France
- Region: Occitania
- Department: Aude
- Arrondissement: Carcassonne
- Canton: Le Bassin chaurien

Government
  - Mayor (2020–2026): Gilles Terrisson
- Area^{1}: 12.61 km^{2} (4.87 sq mi)
- Elevation: 210 m (690 ft)
- Highest elevation: 306 m (1,004 ft)
- Lowest elevation: 188 m (617 ft)
- Population (2023): 356
  - Density: 28.2/km^{2} (73.1/sq mi)
- Time zone: UTC+01:00 (CET)
  - Summer (DST): UTC+02:00 (CEST)
- INSEE/Postal code: 11252 /11320
- ^{1} French Land Register data, which excludes lakes, ponds, glaciers > 1 km^{2} (0.386 sq mi or 247 acres) and river estuaries.

Montmaur (French pronunciation: [mɔ̃mɔʁ]) is a commune in the Aude department in southern France.

== Population ==
Historical population
| Year | Pop. | ±% p.a. |
|---|---|---|
| 1968 | 290 | — |
| 1975 | 241 | −2.61% |
| 1982 | 228 | −0.79% |
| 1990 | 242 | +0.75% |
| 1999 | 266 | +1.06% |
| 2007 | 310 | +1.93% |
| 2012 | 324 | +0.89% |
| 2017 | 307 | −1.07% |
| 2023 | 356 | +2.50% |
Source: INSEE

== See also ==
- Communes of the Aude department
