= Roman Catholic Diocese of Saint-Papoul =

Coordinates: 43.33°N 2.03°E

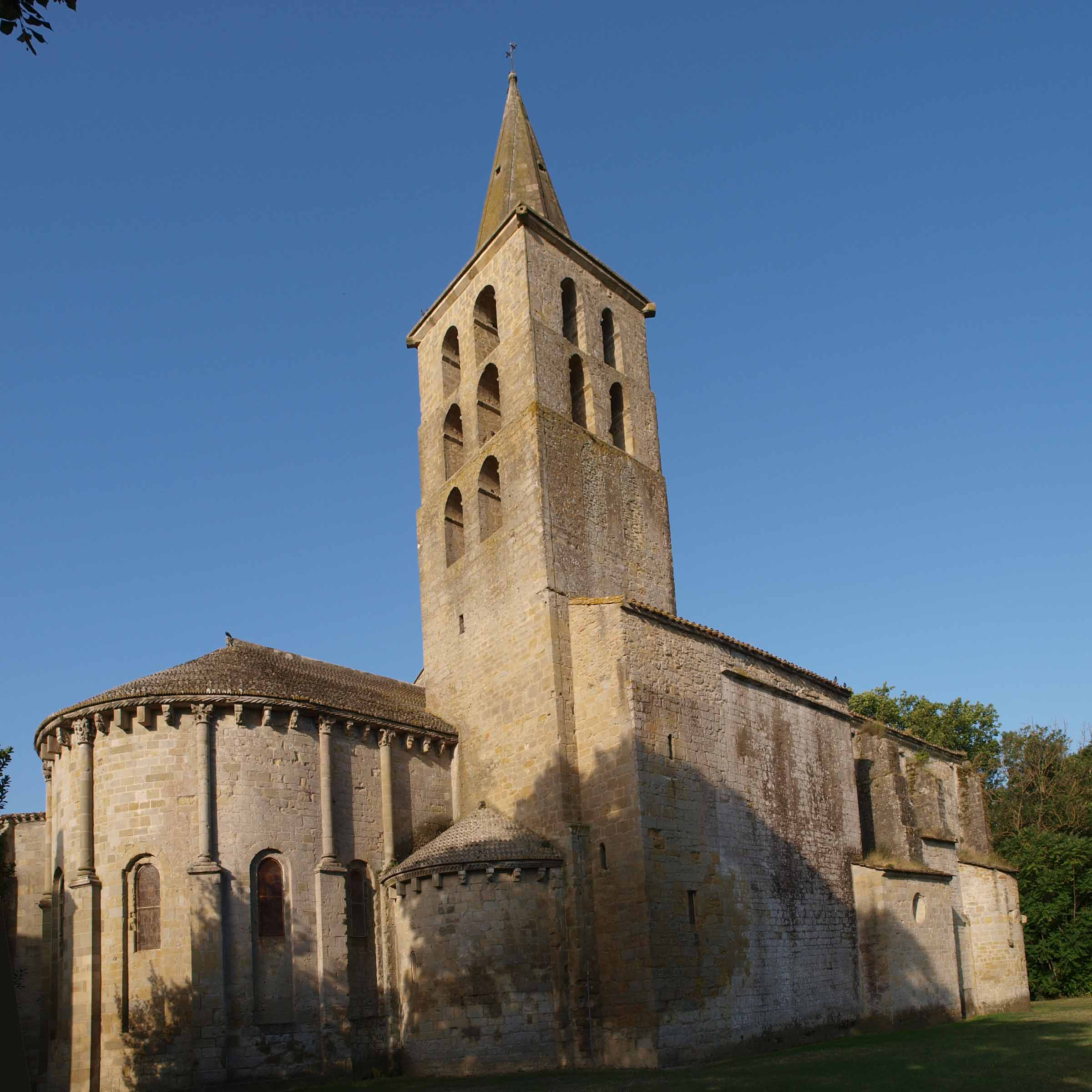
Saint-Papoul Cathedral

The former French Roman Catholic Diocese of Saint-Papoul, now a Latin titular see, was created by Pope John XXII in 1317 and existed until the Napoleonic Concordat of 1811.

The seat of the diocese was at Saint-Papoul, in south-west France, in the modern department of Aude; it was some distance northeast of the main highway between Carcassonne and Toulouse, where there was already a Benedictine monastery, founded in the eighth century and dedicated to Saint Papoul. The bishop of Saint-Papoul was suffragan of the Archbishop of Toulouse.

The diocese existed until the French Revolution. It was one of the diocese scheduled to be suppressed under the Civil Constitution of the Clergy (1790). Under the Concordat of 1801 its territory was taken over by the Diocese of Carcassonne.

== History ==
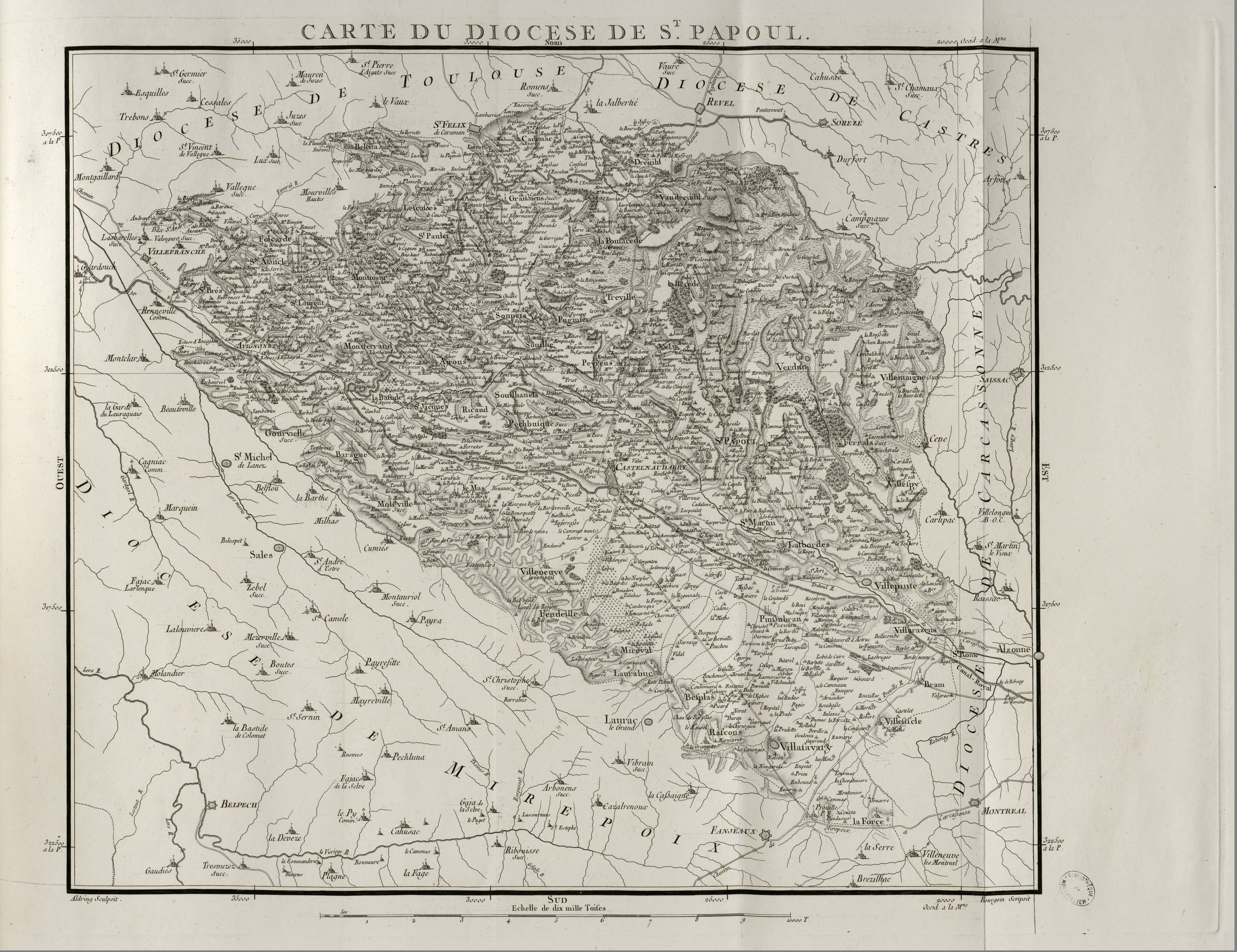
Map of Diocese of Saint-Papoul

In his bull of erection, issued on 22 February 1317, Pope John XXII stated that the population in the diocese of Toulouse was growing at such a pace that the Bishop was no longer able to govern his people effectively; and that therefore, having consulted with the cardinals, he had decided to promote the diocese of Toulouse into an Archbishopric and Metropolitanate, with four new dioceses, one of which was Saint-Papoul.

The Benedictine abbey of Saint-Papoul was converted into the cathedral, and the monks were organized into a Cathedral Chapter consisting of twelve Canons led by a Prior Major (rather than Dean or Provost, since they remained a monastic community). In 1670 the Chapter was converted into a college of twelve secular Canons, with a Provost and four prebendaries.

The Pope also made the church of Castelnaudary into a Collegiate Church of twelve Canons, with a Dean, a Sacristan, a Precentor; there were also to be three hebdomadary priests, 24 chaplains, two deacons and two subdeacons, as well as six clerics in minor orders.

In 1716, there were approximately 1,000 faithful Catholics in the town of Saint-Papuli, and the diocese contained forty-four parishes. In 1774 there were still approximately 1,000 faithful Catholics, owing temporal obedience to the King of France.

The diocese was suppressed on 29 November 1801 by Pope Pius VII, in accordance with the Napoleonic Concordat of 1801, its territory being reassigned to the Metropolitan Archdiocese of Toulouse and to the Diocese of Carcassonne.

== Bishops of Saint-Papoul ==
- Bernard de la Tour (11 July - death 27 December 1317)
- Raymond de Mostuèjouls (1319.04.16 – 1327.12.18)
- Guillaume de Cardailhac (1328–1347)
- Bernard de Saint-Martial = Bertrand de la Tour : 1348-1361
- Pierre de Cros I., Cluny branch of the Benedictine Order (O.S.B) (1362.07.27 – 1370.06.08); later Metropolitan Archbishop of Bourges (France) (8?9 June 1370 – 1374.08.02), Chamberlain of the Holy Roman Church of Reverend Apostolic Camera (1371.06.20 – 1388.11.16), Metropolitan Archbishop of Arles (France) (2 August 1274 – 1388.01), uncanonical Pseudocardinal-Priest of Saints Nereus and Achilleus (1383.12.23 – death 16 November 1388) under Antipope Clement VII
- Bernard de Castelnau, O.S.B : 1370-1375
- Pierre de Cros (II) : 1375-1412
- Jean de La Rochetaillée : 1413-1418?
- Jean de Burle : 1418-1422
- Raymond Macrose (Mairose) : 1423-1426
- Pierre Soybert : 1427–1443
- Raymond de Lupault : 1451-ca. 1465
- Jean de La Porte : 1465–1468
- Denis de Bar: 1468-1471
- Clément de Brillac 1472–1495
- Denis de Bar 1495-1510 (second time)
- Karl de Bar 1510–1538
- Giovanni Salviati 1538-1549 (administrator; Cardinal)
- Bernardo Salviati 1549-1561 (Cardinal)
- Antoine-Marie Salviati 1561-1564 (Cardinal)
- Alexandre de Bardis 1564–1591
- Jean Raimond 1602-1604
- François de Donnadieu 1608–1626
- Louis de Claret 1626–1636
- Bernard Despruets 1636-1655
- Jean de Montpezat de Carbon 1657-1664
- Joseph de Montpezat de Carbon : 1664-1674
- François Barthélemy de Grammont : 1677-1716
- Gabriel-Florent de Choiseul-Beaupré : 1716-1723
- Jean-Charles de Ségur : 1724-1735
- Georges Lazare Berger de Charancy 1735-1738
- Daniel Bertrand de Langle : 1739-1774
- Guillaume-Joseph d'Abzac de Mayac : 1775-1784
- Jean-Baptiste-Marie de Maillé de La Tour-Landry 1784-1801

== Titular see ==
On 2009.02.09 the diocese was nominally restored as Titular bishopric of Saint-Papoul (French) / Sancti Papuli (Latin adjective).

It has had the following incumbents, so far of the fitting Episcopal (lowest) rank :

- Bertrand Lacombe (2016.04.14 – ...), Auxiliary Bishop of Bordeaux (France).

== See also ==
- List of Catholic dioceses in France
- Catholic Church in France

== Sources and external links ==
=== Reference works ===
- Gams, Pius Bonifatius (1873). Series episcoporum Ecclesiae catholicae: quotquot innotuerunt a beato Petro apostolo. Ratisbon: Typis et Sumptibus Georgii Josephi Manz. pp. 582–584. (Use with caution; obsolete)
- Eubel, Conradus, ed. (1913). Hierarchia catholica, Tomus 1 (second ed.). Münster: Libreria Regensbergiana. (in Latin) p. 390.
- Eubel, Conradus, ed. (1914). Hierarchia catholica, Tomus 2 (second ed.). Münster: Libreria Regensbergiana. (in Latin) p. 212.
- Eubel, Conradus; Gulik, Guilelmus, eds. (1923). Hierarchia catholica, Tomus 3 (second ed.). Münster: Libreria Regensbergiana. p. 253.
- Gauchat, Patritius (Patrice) (1935). Hierarchia catholica IV (1592-1667). Münster: Libraria Regensbergiana. pp. 273–274.
- Ritzler, Remigius; Sefrin, Pirminus (1952). Hierarchia catholica medii et recentis aevi V (1667-1730). Patavii: Messagero di S. Antonio. pp. 280.
- Ritzler, Remigius; Sefrin, Pirminus (1958). Hierarchia catholica medii et recentis aevi VI (1730-1799). Patavii: Messagero di S. Antonio. p. 328.
- Sainte-Marthe, Denis de (1785). Gallia christiana, in provincias ecclesiasticas distributa (in Latin). Vol. Tomus tertius decimus (13). Paris: excudebat Johannes- Baptista Coignard, regis & Academiae Gallicae Architypographus. pp. 299–318, Instrumenta, pp. 247–262.

=== Studies ===
- Blanc, Jean (1982). L'abbaye de Saint-Papoul (Carcassonne 1982) 28pp.
- Douaie, Célestin (1880). "État du diocèse de Saint-Papoul et sénéchaussée du Lauragais en 1573". Mémoires de l'Académie des sciences, inscriptions, et belles-lettres de Toulouse. Série 9, Tome 2 (1890), pp. 473–489.
- Du Bourg, Henry (1914). "La saisie du temporal ecclésiastique du diocese de Saint-Papoul en 1582". Revue des questions historiques. 96: 69–81.
- Hennet de Bernoville, Hyppolyte-Amédée (1863). Mélanges concernant l'évêché de St-Papoul: pages extraites et traduites d'un manuscrit du quinzième siècle (in French and Latin). Paris: AD. Lainé et J. Havard.
- Jean, Armand (1891). Les évêques et les archevêques de France depuis 1682 jusqu'à 1801 (in French). Paris: A. Picard. p. 403.
- Pradalier-Schlumberger, Michèle (1998). Toulouse et le Languedoc: la sculpture gothique, XIIIe-XIVe siècles (in French). Toulouse: Presses Univ. du Mirail. pp. 163–165. ISBN 978-2-85816-374-8.
- Sabarthès, Antoine (1902). Inventaire des droits et revenus de l'évêché de Saint-Papoul (in French and Latin). Paris: Picard.

==== External links ====
- GCatholic - former and titular see
