= Molleville =

Commune in Occitanie, France

- Commune
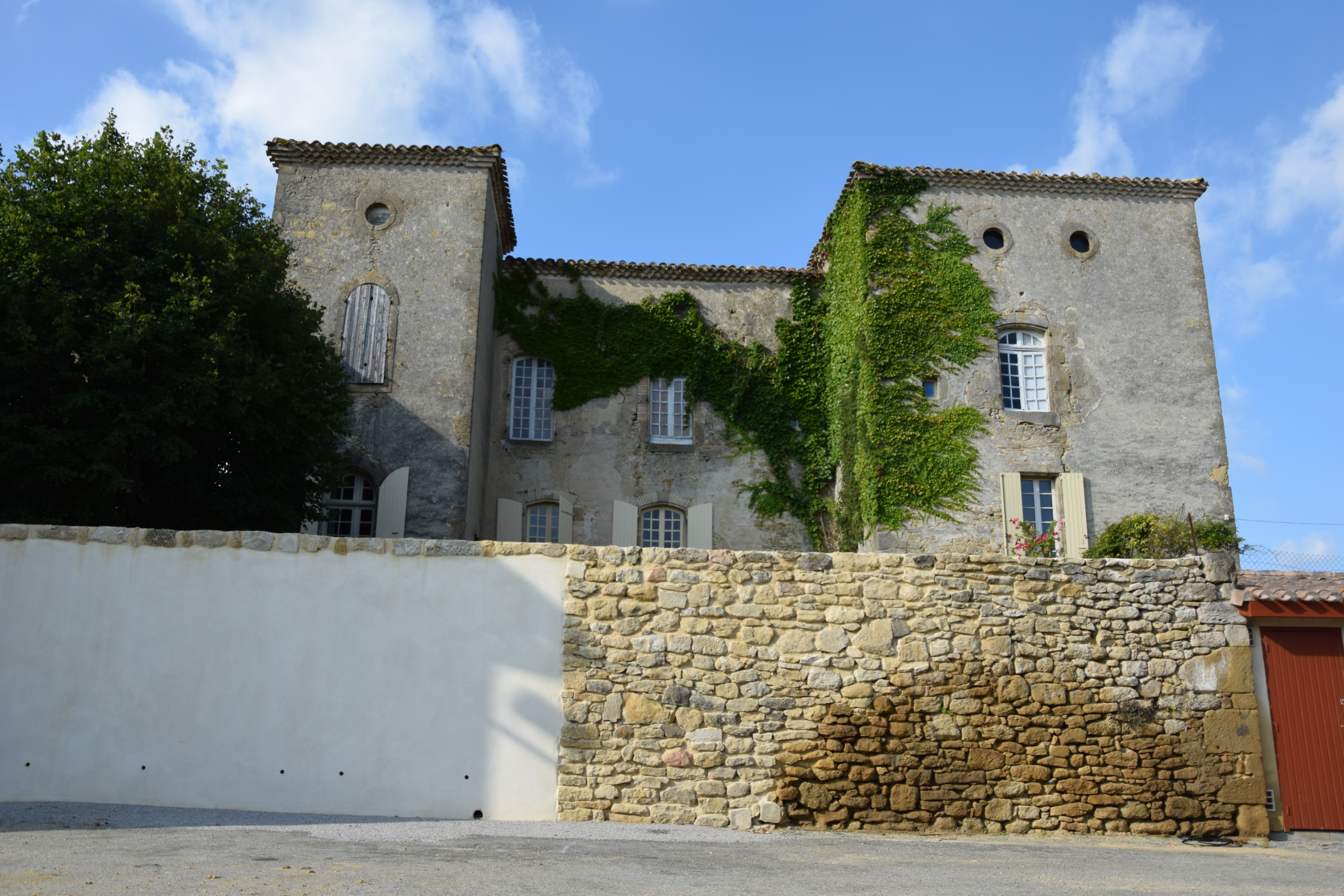
- The chateau in Molleville

- Coat of arms
- Location of Molleville
- Location within France Location within Occitanie
- Coordinates: 43°18′47″N 1°50′06″E
- Country: France
- Region: Occitania
- Department: Aude
- Arrondissement: Carcassonne
- Canton: La Piège au Razès

Government
  - Mayor (2020–2026): Gilbert Coste
- Area^{1}: 3.59 km^{2} (1.39 sq mi)
- Elevation: 280 m (920 ft)
- Highest elevation: 294 m (965 ft)
- Lowest elevation: 223 m (732 ft)
- Population (2023): 128
  - Density: 35.7/km^{2} (92.3/sq mi)
- Time zone: UTC+01:00 (CET)
  - Summer (DST): UTC+02:00 (CEST)
- INSEE/Postal code: 11238 /11410
- ^{1} French Land Register data, which excludes lakes, ponds, glaciers > 1 km^{2} (0.386 sq mi or 247 acres) and river estuaries.

Molleville (French pronunciation: [mɔlvil]; Occitan: Molevila) is a commune in the Aude department in southern France.

== Population ==
Historical population
Year	Pop.	±% p.a.
1968	63	—
1975	50	−3.25%
1982	52	+0.56%
1990	53	+0.24%
1999	76	+4.09%
2007	86	+1.56%
2012	102	+3.47%
2017	130	+4.97%
2023	128	−0.26%
Source: INSEE

== See also ==
- Communes of the Aude department
