= Azille =

Commune in Occitanie, France

- Commune
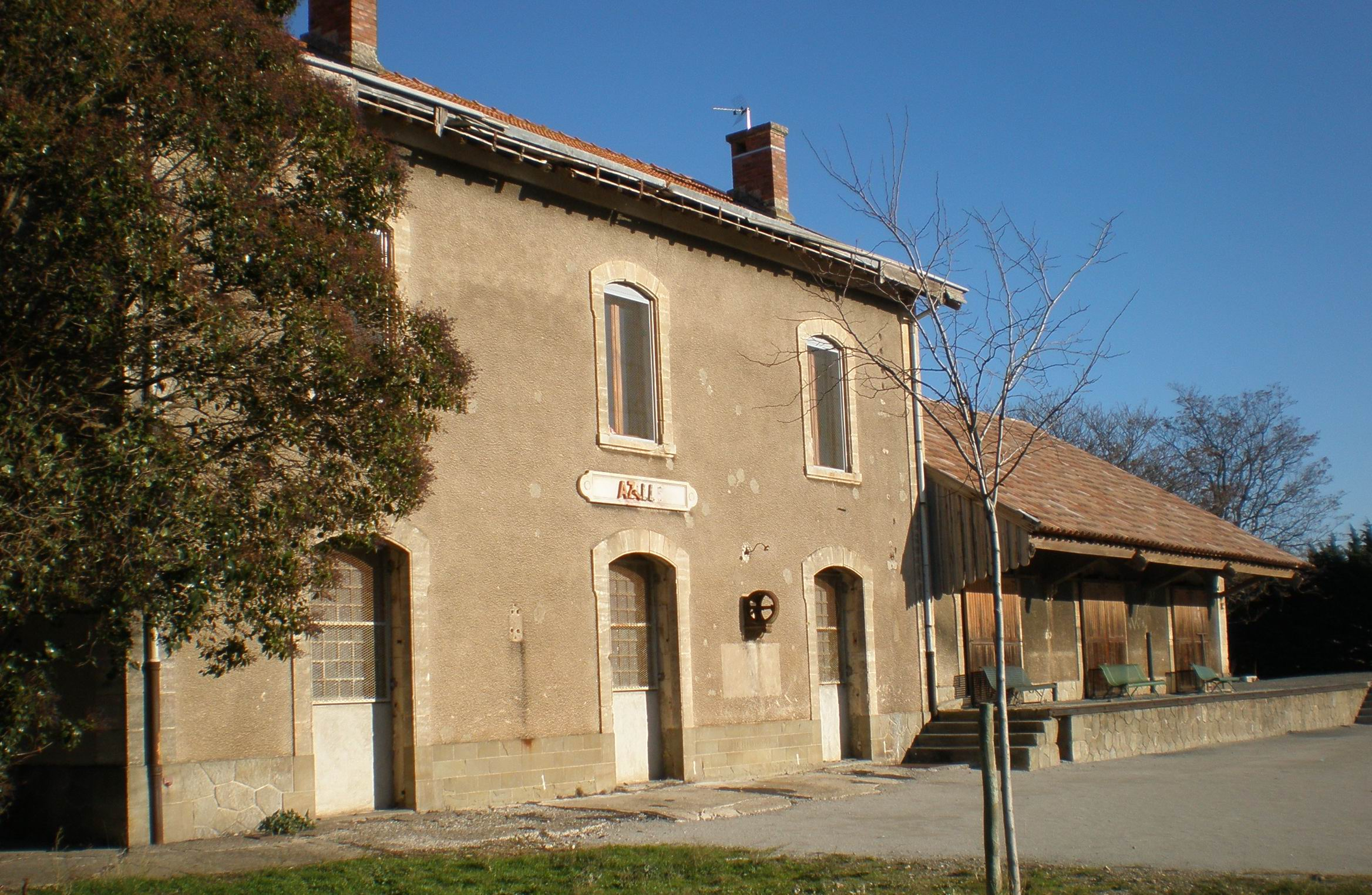
- The old railway station

- Coat of arms
- Location of Azille
- Location within France Location within Occitanie
- Coordinates: 43°16′40″N 2°39′30″E
- Country: France
- Region: Occitania
- Department: Aude
- Arrondissement: Carcassonne
- Canton: Le Haut-Minervois
- Intercommunality: Carcassonne Agglo

Government
  - Mayor (2020–2026): Georges Saliège
- Area^{1}: 23.33 km^{2} (9.01 sq mi)
- Elevation: 84 m (276 ft)
- Highest elevation: 120 m (390 ft)
- Lowest elevation: 39 m (128 ft)
- Population (2023): 1,115
  - Density: 47.79/km^{2} (123.8/sq mi)
- Time zone: UTC+01:00 (CET)
  - Summer (DST): UTC+02:00 (CEST)
- INSEE/Postal code: 11022 /11700
- ^{1} French Land Register data, which excludes lakes, ponds, glaciers > 1 km^{2} (0.386 sq mi or 247 acres) and river estuaries.

Azille (French pronunciation: [azij]; Occitan: Asilha lo Comtal) is a commune in the Aude department in the Occitanie region of southern France.

== Geography ==
Azille is located at the foot of the Montagne Noire some 25 km east by north-east of Carcassonne and 25 km west by north-west of Narbonne. The commune is traversed by the D610 from Homps to Puichéric in the south-east and also by the D11 from La Redorte to Rieux-Minervois in the west. Access to the town is by the D206 from Rieux-Minervois which goes to the village then continues north-east to Pépieux. The D72 comes from La Redorte in the south and passes through the town going north to join the D52. The D272 goes north-west from the town to La Livinière. The D606 goes south-east from the town to Homps. Apart from a large lake in the east of the commune (the Lac de Jouarres), which also forms the departmental border between Aude and Hérault, the commune is all farmland. Apart from the village there is the hamlet of Vaissiere in the west.

The river Aude forms the south-eastern border of the commune with the parallel Canal du Midi passing through the south-east of the commune. Several streams rise in the north-west of the commune and flow south-east to join the Aude including the Ruisseau de Georges, the Ruisseau de l'Etang de Jouarres, and the Ruisseau de l'Aiguille.

== History ==
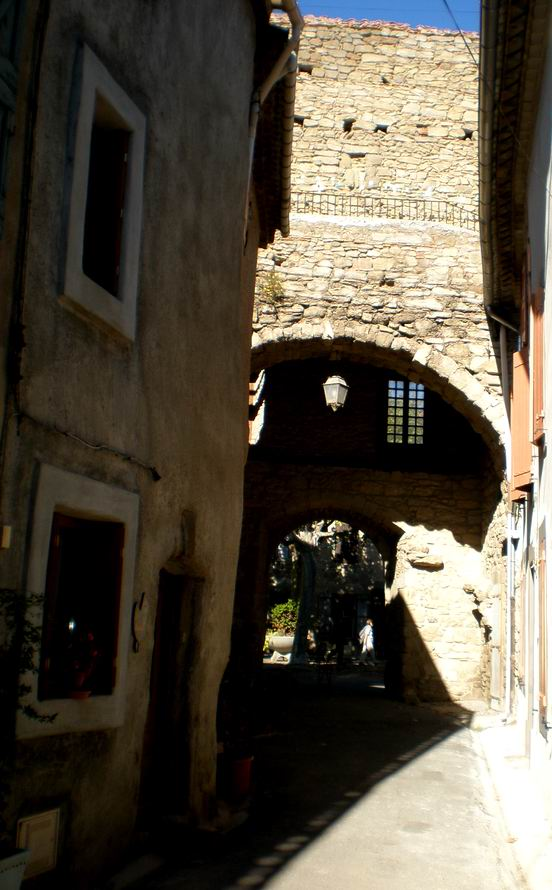
A door in the City walls

Azille contains Prehistoric remains of past civilisations including cremation graves from the Iron Age, many of which are preserved in the Olonzac museum. There is a superb Roman villa displayed at Billery and there is a statue of Silenus in Greek style, which could be a representation of the Satyr Marcyas, displayed in the Archaeological Museum of Narbonne. The recent discovery of a Visigothic necropolis at the edge of the village indicates habitation since earliest times.

In the Middle Ages, Azille was one of the most important towns in the Archidiocese of Narbonne. In the 14th century the village supported the church of Saint Julien which was part of the chapter of Saint Just of Narbonne. There were also two convents: the Franciscans and the Royal Abbey of Saint Clare. Unusually, apart from the episcopal city, the town was the only one to have two parishes: Saint-Julien and Saint-André. The parish of Saint-André, which is known today only from ruins and the name of a quarter in the town, was united with Saint-Jacques-de-Béziers in 1096, then with the Abbey of Lagrasse in 1118, then finally with Saint-Sebastian-de-Narbonne.

Saint-Julien was the seat of the Archpriest of Minervois. In the 14th century it was made a "county": Azilhan lo Comtal which it remained until the end of the 16th century. A town free of all lordly power from 1483, it belonged to the crown and its arms were those of the king. It was administered by an elected council.

Built on a rocky outcrop, the town was surrounded by walls with multiple doors and towers both round and square. The city became too crampd inside its walls and several suburbs were created to the east beyond the Narbonne gate - the oldest of which had its own wall.

At the beginning of the 13th century Azille was part of the Cathar inspiration and contained a house of Perfects which was destroyed in the period of the Albigensian Crusade. In 1289, 63 years after the death of Francis of Assisi, Eustache de Lévis founded or restored the convent of Franciscans outside the walls to the north of the city. In 1331 his daughter, Isabelle de Lévis - widow of Bertrand de l'Isle, founded The Royal Abbey of Saint Claire (the Abbey of Poor Clares) inside the walls. The remains of the walls and some monuments are still visible today.

The town's economy was traditionally based on wheat: Azille wheat being highly prized in the 19th century. The commune was also the largest producer of olive oil in the region and there was also wine. The multitude of springs in the area allowed tanners and drapers to prosper.

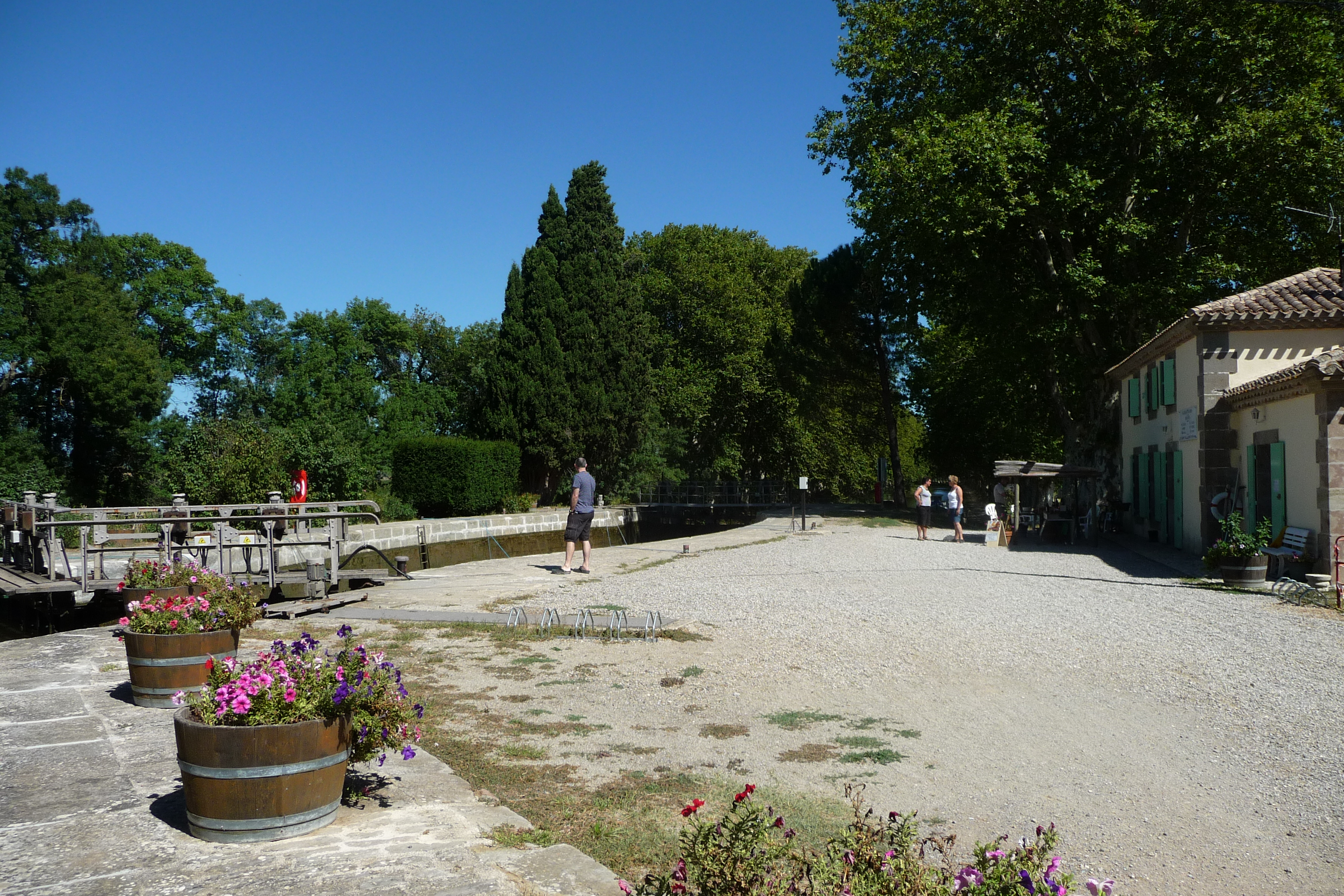
Jouarres lock on the Canal du Midi

By the end of the 19th century, with the arrival of the railway (the Moux to Caunes-Minervois line), further commerce developed which in turn led to building large houses such as the Château Gallimard where the musician César Franck stayed. The Canal du Midi, built in 1666, traverses the commune for four kilometres. There is a lock in the commune and the Riquet de Jouarres bridge.

=== Heraldry ===
Arms of Azille	Blazon: Azure, 3 fleurs-de-lys of Or, 2 and 1.

== Administration ==
List of successive mayors

From	To	Name	Party
2001	2020	Philippe Chevrier	DVD
2020	2026	Georges Saliège	

== Population ==
The inhabitants of the commune are known as Azillois or Azilloises in French.

Historical population

Year	Pop.	±% p.a.
1793	1,114	—
1800	1,373	+3.03%
1806	1,467	+1.11%
1821	1,488	+0.09%
1831	1,498	+0.07%
1836	1,580	+1.07%
1841	1,572	−0.10%
1846	1,638	+0.83%
1851	1,648	+0.12%
1856	1,613	−0.43%
1861	1,680	+0.82%
1866	1,860	+2.06%
1872	1,854	−0.05%
1876	1,970	+1.53%
1881	2,238	+2.58%
1886	2,129	−0.99%
1891	1,941	−1.83%
1896	2,000	+0.60%
1901	2,062	+0.61%

Year	Pop.	±% p.a.
1906	2,107	+0.43%
1911	2,033	−0.71%
1921	2,110	+0.37%
1926	1,960	−1.46%
1931	1,989	+0.29%
1936	1,836	−1.59%
1946	1,564	−1.59%
1954	1,524	−0.32%
1962	1,495	−0.24%
1968	1,441	−0.61%
1975	1,205	−2.52%
1982	1,195	−0.12%
1990	1,052	−1.58%
1999	1,056	+0.04%
2007	1,116	+0.69%
2012	1,184	+1.19%
2017	1,144	−0.68%
2023	1,115	−0.43%

Source: EHESS and INSEE

An Azille streetscape

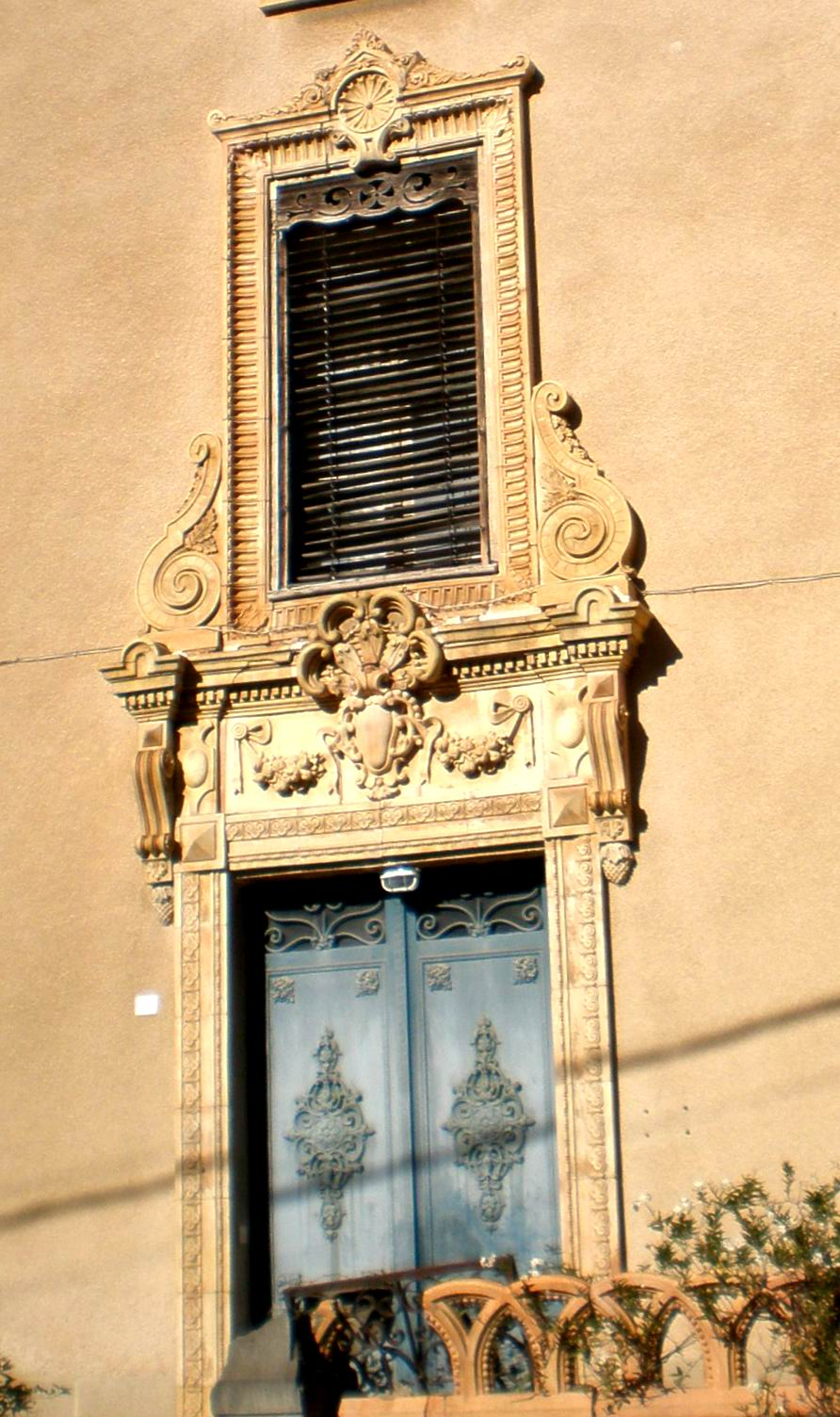
House ornamentation

== Economy ==
=== Wineries ===
Azille, with an area of 2,333 hectares, includes 14 areas:

- Jouarres is one of the last wineries from the 19th century with wooden barrels. An area traversed by the Canal du Midi and the Aude river. The Ruisseau de l'Aiguille is cut by a secondary Roman road near Fans.
- The Hamlet of Jouarres, near the Jouarres lake, is now converted into a leisure park.
- Les Cascals has a significant Aqueduct between the Aude and the Canal du Midi.
- Les Fans was once owned (1700) by the Lord of Massiac of Gazel and is traversed by a secondary Roman road.
- Sainte-Marie on the banks of the Canal du Midi
- Saint-Julien (biological products).
- The Chateau of Floris, a 19th-century building, it was founded in 1536 on the way to Rieux.
- Massiac a stronghold built in 1697.
- Vaissière and its Romanesque church from the 12th century at Saint-Étienne de Tersan, near the Argent -Double river.

On both sides of the road from Rieux to La Redorte the Argent Double river also borders:

- La Chouppe, La Rèze, and Les Salices, which all belonged to the Poor Clares.
- The "Moulin des Nonnes (Nuns' Mill) is an abandoned property that belonged to the Royal Abbey of Saint-Clair-d'Azille in the Middle Ages and which had a water mill.
- The Domain of the 3 Angels where the vineyard is located on the Liviniere, Siran, and next to Jouarres Lake.

The commune is also remarkable for the diversity of its fauna and its flora with its typically Mediterranean Garrigue and olive trees.

The cultivation of olives has been increasing for a decade.

=== Transport ===
From 1887 to 1939 Azille was served by the Moux to Caunes-Minervois railway line. The station remains visible as well as a large part of the structures and embankments.

== Culture and heritage ==
An Azille landscape, looking south

=== Civil heritage ===
The commune has a number of sites that are registered as historical monuments:

- The Canal du Midi (1679)
- The Maison Cros (Cros House) (14th century)
- The War Memorial 1914-1918 (1921)

Other sites of interest

- The Château of Vaissières contains a Bas-relief (Late Middle Ages) which is registered as an historical object.
- The Cemetery on the Route de Siran contains a Priests' Monument which is registered as an historical object.
- The Ramparts from the Middle Ages: Partially destroyed in the 18th century, they were for the most integrated with houses built on its frontage. It is possible to follow the line along the boulevards that replaced the old moat. Some portions are visible in several places, especially near the visitor centre.
- Witnesses to the great wine era (1870–1910): The Jouarres aging cellar
- The Chateau and its neo-Gothic portal near the canal bridge
- The neo-Renaissance Chateau at Floris.
- Jouarres Lake.
- The Aqueduc d'Azille was built for irrigation purposes in the 19th century.

=== Religious heritage ===
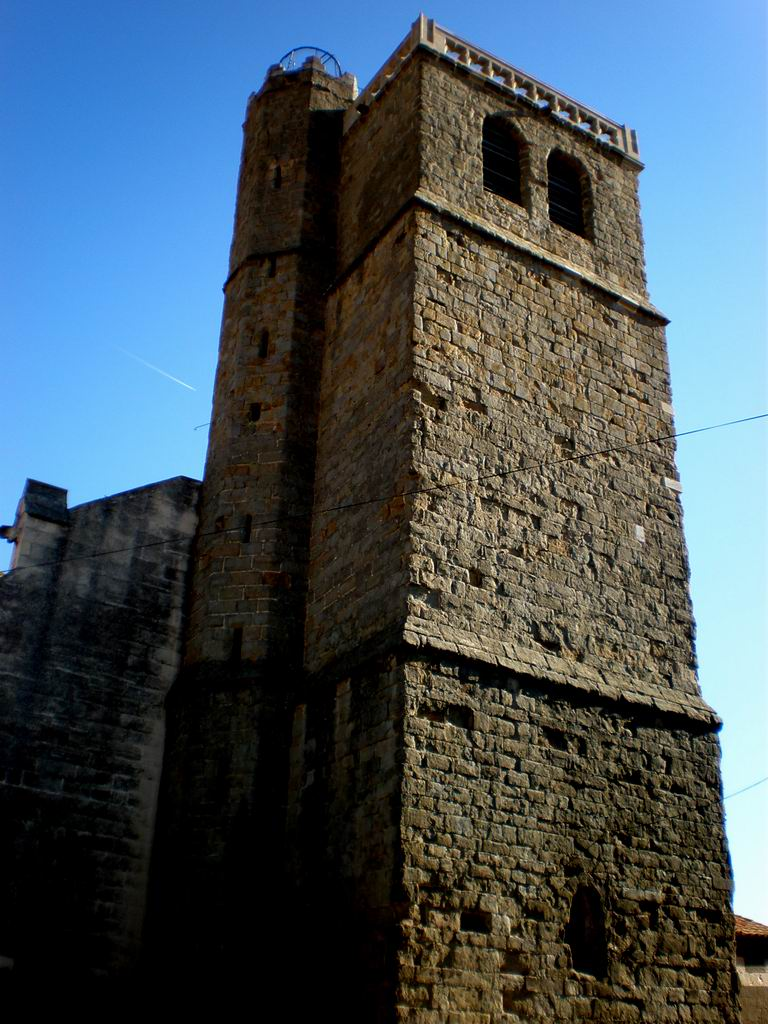
The Church bell tower

The commune has several religious buildings and structures that are registered as historical monuments:

- The Church of Saint-Julien and Saint-Basilisse (14th century). The church is a remarkable example of Southern Gothic with a wide nave with three vaulted transepts, a broad framed apse, and a bell tower 36 m high. It contains a chapel of the Brotherhood of Saint Jacques with statues and shrines in gilded wood. This chapel was used as headquarters for the brotherhood of pilgrims. Azille was once a starting place of pilgrimage to Compostela. The church also houses one of the finest achievements of Southern Gothic sculpture: a Virgin and Child in polychrome stone, considered one of the finest achievements of Gothic sculpture of the 14th century in southern France. It was displayed as such in two exhibitions in Paris notably at the Grand Palais. The church contains several items that are registered as historical objects:
  - A Bronze Bell (1776)
  - A Bronze Bell (1611)
  - A Bronze Bell (1607)
  - A Pulpit (18th century)
  - A Painting: Christ on the Cross between Saint Julien, Saint Basilisse, and Saint Madeleine (1688)
  - A Painting: The Ecstasy of Saint Francis (18th century)
  - A Painting: Saint Barthélémy (17th century)
  - A Painting: Saint Michel between a martyred pope and Saint Sebastian (17th century)
  - A Painting: Saint Francis receiving the drawstring bag (18th century)
  - A Monumental Harmonium (1860)
  - A Statue: Virgin and child (14th century)

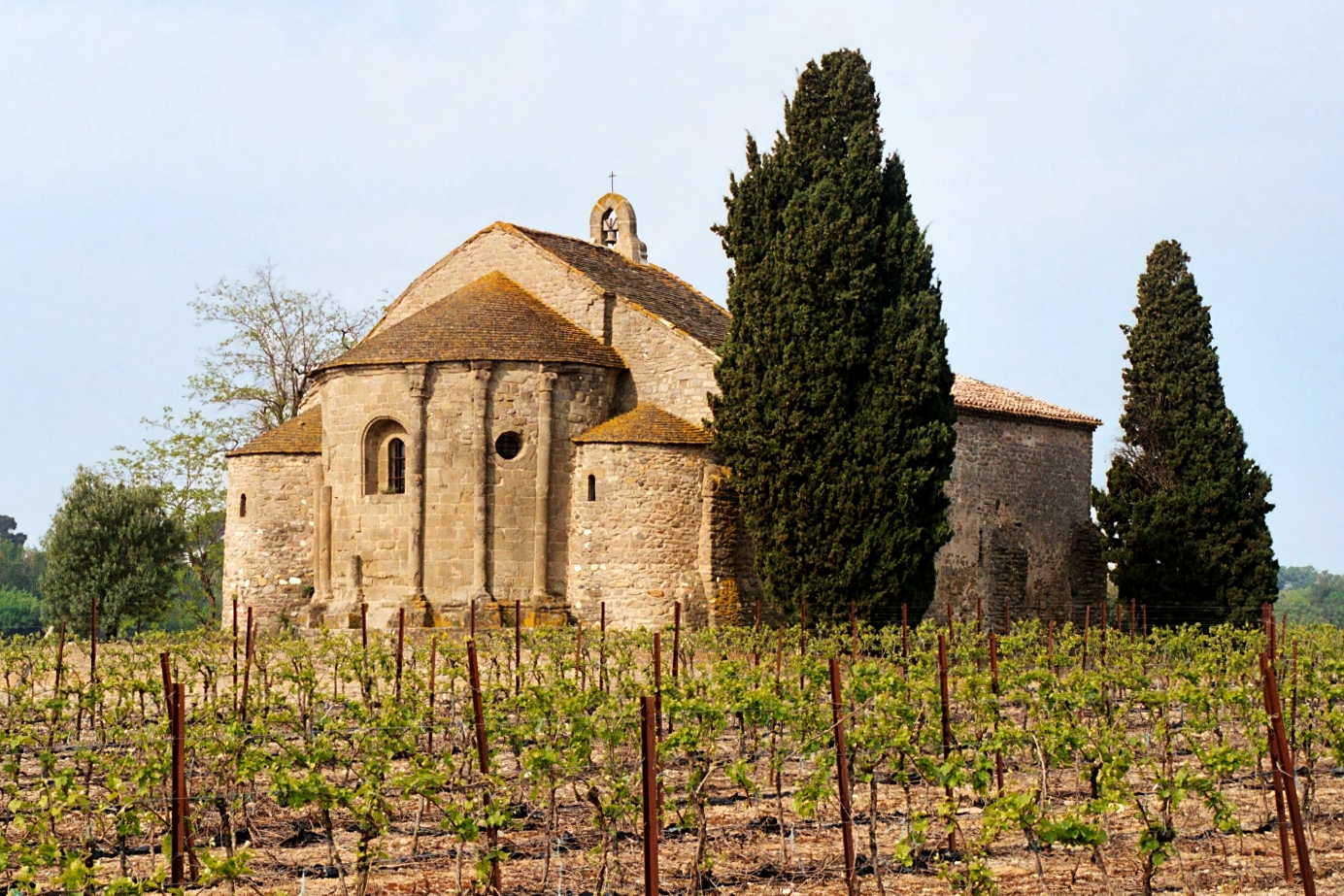
The Chapel of Vaissière

- The Chapel of Vaissière (12th century). This small pre-Romanesque chapel is none other than the former church of Saint-Etienne de Tersan and was probably built before 1184. The chapel has a basilical plan with three naves and three apses. The tripartite nave and two of the apses date back to the 10th century. Part of the vaulting over the nave was built in the 11th century. The capital to the south of the choir was attributed to the workshop of the Master of Cabestany. It was created in the 12th century during the reconstruction of the great apse.
- The old Chapel of the Poor Clares (15th century). It was decommissioned and sold to individuals under the French Revolution, the remains can be seen in the church square.

Other religious sites of interest

- The Monastery of Poor Clares. The Poor Clares returned to Azille in 1891 and built their monastery near the road to Liviniere. In 2008 the Poor Clares have passed the monastery to the Chanoinesses de la Mère de Dieu. The building contains two items that are registered as historical objects:
  - A Painting: the death of Saint Clare (17th century)
  - A Head: Christ (16th century)
- The Saint-André spring flowed from a Gothic shrine in the 14th century which was vaulted by a ribbed vault. It is named after the parish that existed in the 11th century and was destroyed in 1791.
- The former Rectory, presumably the Tinal for the archpriests: a room with a floor supported by diaphragm arches at three points, chamfered, visible at the tourist office.

St. Clair monastery religious Clare returned to Azille in 1891 and built their monastery near the road to Liviniere. 2008 3, the Poor Clares have passed the baton to Chanoinesses of the Mother of God. The convent of the Cordeliers, founded in the 13th century, sold to the Revolution, you can still see the remains of the Franciscan church homes. Several stone carvings on the facades of buildings in the city from it without doubt. The arches of the choir of the church are visible from the aisles Pol-Lapeyre.

=== Festivals ===
The town hosts a Feria for several days around 1 May. It is managed by 120 volunteers and attracts about 30,000 people. It had its 10th anniversary in 2012.

== Notable people ==
- Pol Lapeyre, a young Saint-Cyrien born in Azille, died at 20 years old after struggling to defend his position for 60 days and nights during fighting in Morocco in 1925.
- Gabriel Delort, General Counsel for Aude from 1799 to 1830.

== See also ==
- Communes of the Aude department
