= Aigues-Vives, Aude =

Commune in Occitanie, France

Aigues-Vives
- Commune
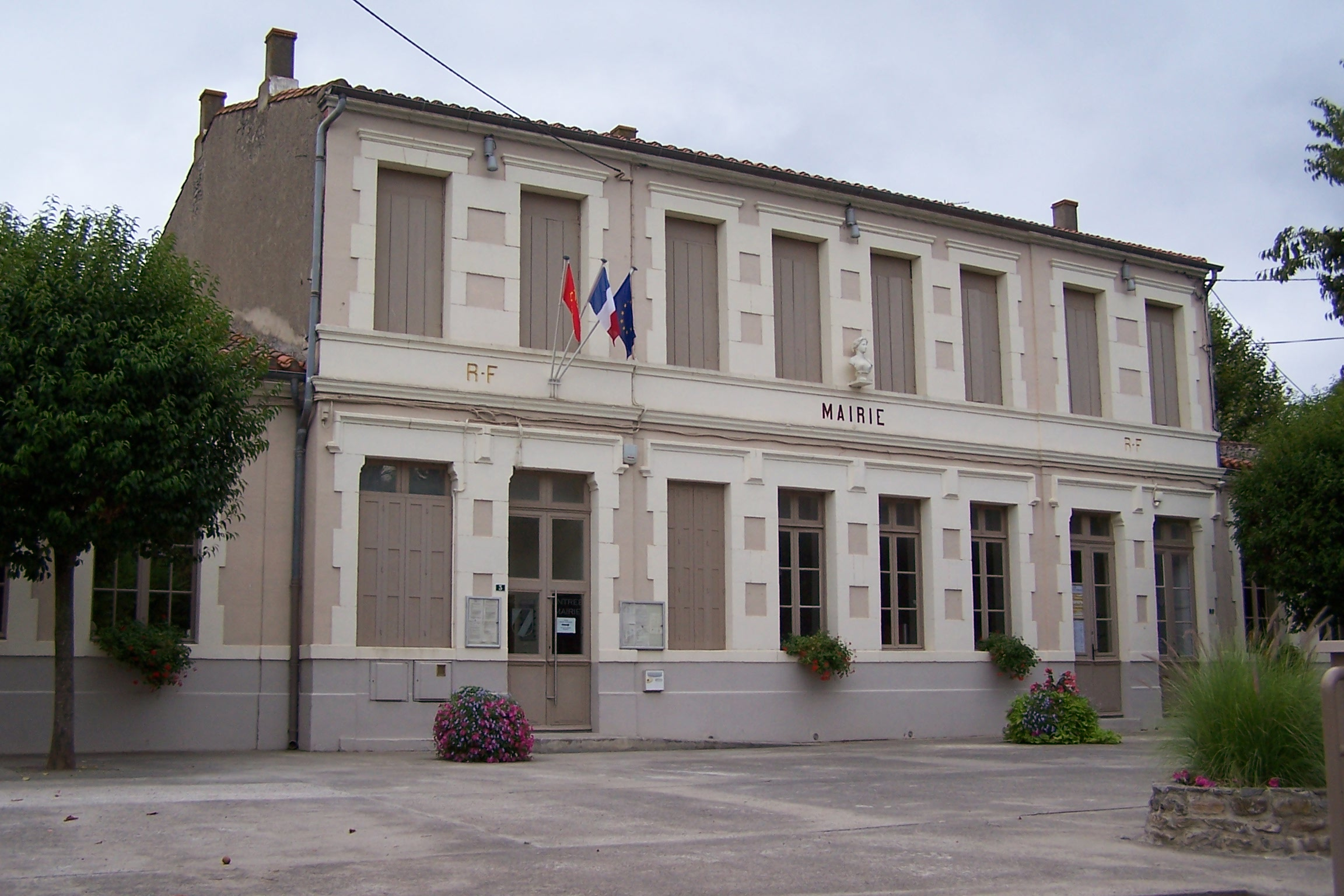
- The Town Hall

- Coat of arms
- Location of Aigues-Vives
- Location within France Location within Occitanie
- Coordinates: 43°13′55″N 2°32′03″E
- Country: France
- Region: Occitania
- Department: Aude
- Arrondissement: Carcassonne
- Canton: Le Haut-Minervois
- Intercommunality: Carcassonne Agglo

Government
  - Mayor (2020–2026): Jean-Pierre Oms
- Area^{1}: 10.21 km^{2} (3.94 sq mi)
- Elevation: 55 m (180 ft)
- Highest elevation: 109 m (358 ft)
- Lowest elevation: 55 m (180 ft)
- Population (2023): 532
  - Density: 52.1/km^{2} (135/sq mi)
- Time zone: UTC+01:00 (CET)
  - Summer (DST): UTC+02:00 (CEST)
- INSEE/Postal code: 11001 /11800
- ^{1} French Land Register data, which excludes lakes, ponds, glaciers > 1 km^{2} (0.386 sq mi or 247 acres) and river estuaries.

Aigues-Vives (French pronunciation: [ɛɡ viv]; Occitan: Aigas Vivas) is a commune in the Aude department in the Occitanie region of southern France.

== Geography ==
=== Localisation ===
Aigues-Vives is located in the north-east of Aude department in the Minervois area some 50 km west by north-west of Narbonne and 14 km east by north-east from Carcassonne. It is traversed by Highway D206 going north-east from Badens through the heart of the commune and the town and continues north-east out of the commune to Rieux-Minervois. Highway D57 also traverses the commune from Laure-Minervois in the north intersecting the Highway D206 in the town of Aigues-Vives and continuing south to join the east-west D610 highway.

The commune is entirely farmland except for the town and a hill on the western edge. There are a few scattered buildings but no villages or towns other than Aigues-Vives. The Ruisseau de Puits flows from the hill in the west to north of the town where it joins the Canal Nord. There are a few other streams in the commune including the Reals, the Mirausse, the Genet, the Mijane, the Canet, the Neuf, the Canal Sud, and the Rigole d'Aigues-Vives.

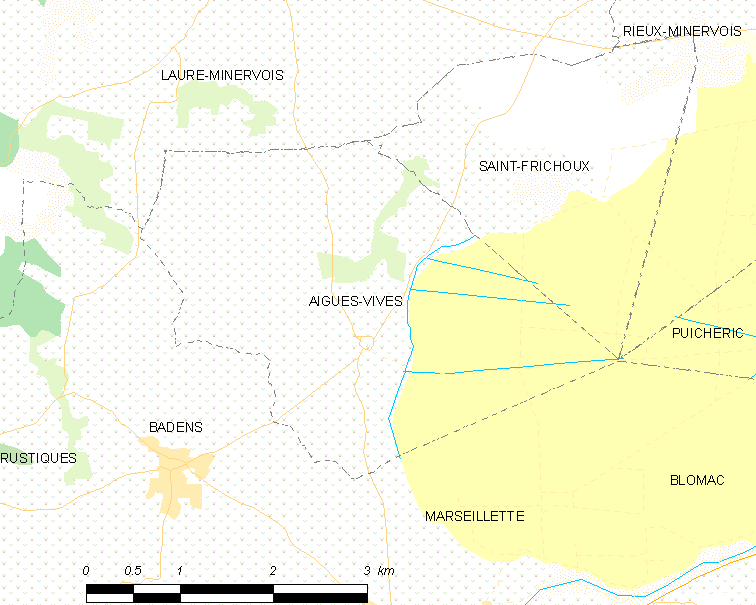
Map of Aigues-Vives and its surrounding communes

== History ==
The first document attesting to the existence of Aigues-Vives was transcribed from the Latin Aquaviva in 994, although some say 993. It was an exchange between Udulgarius, Abbot of Caunes (Minervois) and Roger Trencavel, Viscount of Carcassonne.

== Heraldry ==
Arms of Aigues-Vives	Blazon: Bendy sinister of 4 Or and Vert.

== Administration ==
List of Successive Mayors of Aigues-Vives

Mayors from the 17th century to 1929

From	To	Name
1610		Pierre Durand
1629		Guandalgues
1680		Poudoum
1715		Charle Pierson
1732		Jacques Souleze
1734		Charles Turcy
1736		Antoine Linieres
1738		Jean Souleze
1745		Brousses
1755		Jean Brousses
1758		Brel
1792	1793	Marc Roquefere
1793	1795	Claude Gouiric
1795	1821	Marc Roquefere
1821	1821	Barthélémy Bedon
1821	1826	Jacques Pages
1826	1831	Guillaume Amouroux
1831	1835	Jean Gaches
1835	1843	Guillaume Amouroux
1843	1846	Guillaume Amouroux (nephew)
1848	1864	Jean Gaches
1864	1870	François Gaches
1870	1874	Joseph Cabrol
1874	1880	François Gaches
1880	1892	Bernard Pages
1892	1900	Célestin Luc
1900	1929	Eugène Ressier

Mayors from 1929

From	To	Name	Party
1929	1944	Maurice Gleizes	
1944	1946	Emile Bonnafous	
1946	1959	Paul Caveriviere	
1959	1965	Georges Marc	
1965	1977	Jean-Pascal Andure	
1977	1981	Jean-Paul Combes	
1981	1989	Gabriel Chevalier	PS
1989	2001	Jean-Pascal Andure	FN
2001	2020	Jean-Louis Cassignol	DVD
2020	2026	Jean-Pierre Oms	

== Population ==
The inhabitants of the commune are known as Aigues-Vivois or Aigues-Vivoises in French.

Historical population
Year	Pop.	±% p.a.
1968	518	—
1975	514	−0.11%
1982	480	−0.97%
1990	464	−0.42%
1999	481	+0.40%
2007	504	+0.59%
2012	527	+0.90%
2017	584	+2.08%
2023	532	−1.54%
Source: INSEE

== Economy ==
Viticulture: Minervois AOC, Coteaux de peyriac, and Languedoc AOC. Its territory is planted with olive trees, apple trees, and rice.

== Culture and heritage ==
=== Civil heritage ===
The commune has a number of buildings and structures that are registered as historical monuments:

- A Tile factory (1835)
- The Cooperative Wine Cellar (1937)
- The Wine distillery (1889)
- Land with archaeological remains at Pataran cemetery
- The War memorial at Route de Badens (20th century)

Other sites of interest

- The Étang de Marseillette (Marseillette Pond) is adjacent to the village of Aigues-Vives but dried up in the 19th century. This depression of about 2000 hectares is irrigated by the Aude. The land is covered with crops mainly vineyards and apple orchards. The area of the dried-up pond of Marseillette is next to the Aigues-Vives houses.
- A stately tower of the 13th century next to the church.
- The natural bridge of Saint-Jean.

=== Religious heritage ===
The commune has one religious building that is registered as an historical monument:

- The Church of Saint Alexandre (1530) has a tower that is a registered historical monument, a Gothic chevet and a tower adjoining the church (which serves as a bell tower and whose bell dates to 1562). The Church contains one item that is registered as an historical object:
  - A Chalice with Paten (19th century)
- A Discoidal Steles can be seen under the Porch of the church.
- The Cemetery contains 2 Funerary Steles (Middle Ages)

== Local life ==
In 1902, thanks to the Mayor, Eugene Ressier, Aigues-Vives became an electrified village. The STMF (Société Méridionale de Transport de Force), which was founded in 1900 by Joachim Estrade, installed electricity in the village.

=== Celebration and culture ===
Each year on the second Saturday in October, the "Cavinades" festival is held where winemakers offer tastings of their wine - white, rosé or red from the wine country Coteaux de Peyriac and Minervois.

On the following day each year there is also a celebration for apples, wine and rice.

== Notable people linked to the commune ==
- Pierre Bayle, a potter/ceramist, born in Aigues-Vives on 3 June 1945, died on 18 March 2004 in Béziers.
- Lucien Trougnoux called Louis, born on 25 August 1901 in Louans (Indre-et-Loire), died in June 1945 at the sanatorium in Goisern (Austria) was a French Resistance fighter. He refused the surrender of France in 1940 and the system of the French State of Petain-Laval. He was active in the French resistance. He was a member of a group affiliated with the OSS (Office of Strategic Services of the USA). In Carcassonne he ran the departmental office supplying straw and fodder which served as a cover. He was the central mailbox of the "Fred Tommy Brown" network and he kept the radio transmitter in his office in Carcassonne, then later at Aigues-Vives post office which was run by his wife. On Thursday, 17 November 1943, Lucien Trougnoux was arrested by the Gestapo and the French milice in his home in the Aigues-Vives Post Office (which still stands in 2007). He was imprisoned in the Baumettes Prison in Marseille until early March 1944. He was then deported to Mauthausen. Liberated in May 1945, Lucien Trougnoux died of sickness on 31 May 1945 at the sanatorium of the 1st Army of Colmar in Goisern (Austria).

== Bibliography ==
- Devic & Dom Vaissete, General History of Languedoc, Toulouse (Privat) 1872–1885. (in French)
- Mahul, Cartulary and Archives of the former Diocese and the Arrondissement of Carcassonne, Paris (Didron-Dumoulin) 1857–1885. (in French)
- Antoine Sabarthès, Topographical Dictionary of Aude, Paris (Imprimerie Nationale) 1912. (in French)
- Baichère, Historical Notes and observations on the Church, rural chapels, and old taxes, Academy of Arts and Sciences of Carcassonne in 1909. (in French)
- Auzias & Rancoule, Various notes, Gallo-Roman Archaeology, Aigues-Vives, Society of Scientific Studies of Aude in Carcassonne 1978. (in French)
- Marie-Elise Gardel, Frédéric Loppe and Corinne Sanchez, Aigues-Vives (Aude), a village in the Minervois: historical and archaeological study, Lay Association of Carcassonne History of Aigues-Vives (Aude), 2008, ISBN 978-2-9502965-1-1. (in French)
- Abbot Utheza, Monograph of Aigues-Vives (Aude). (in French)
- Christophe Monié, A History of the drying up of the Marseillette pond the period Camman 1900–1942, Aigues-Vives November 2012. (in French)

== See also ==
- Communes of the Aude department
