= Badens =

Commune in Occitanie, France

- Commune
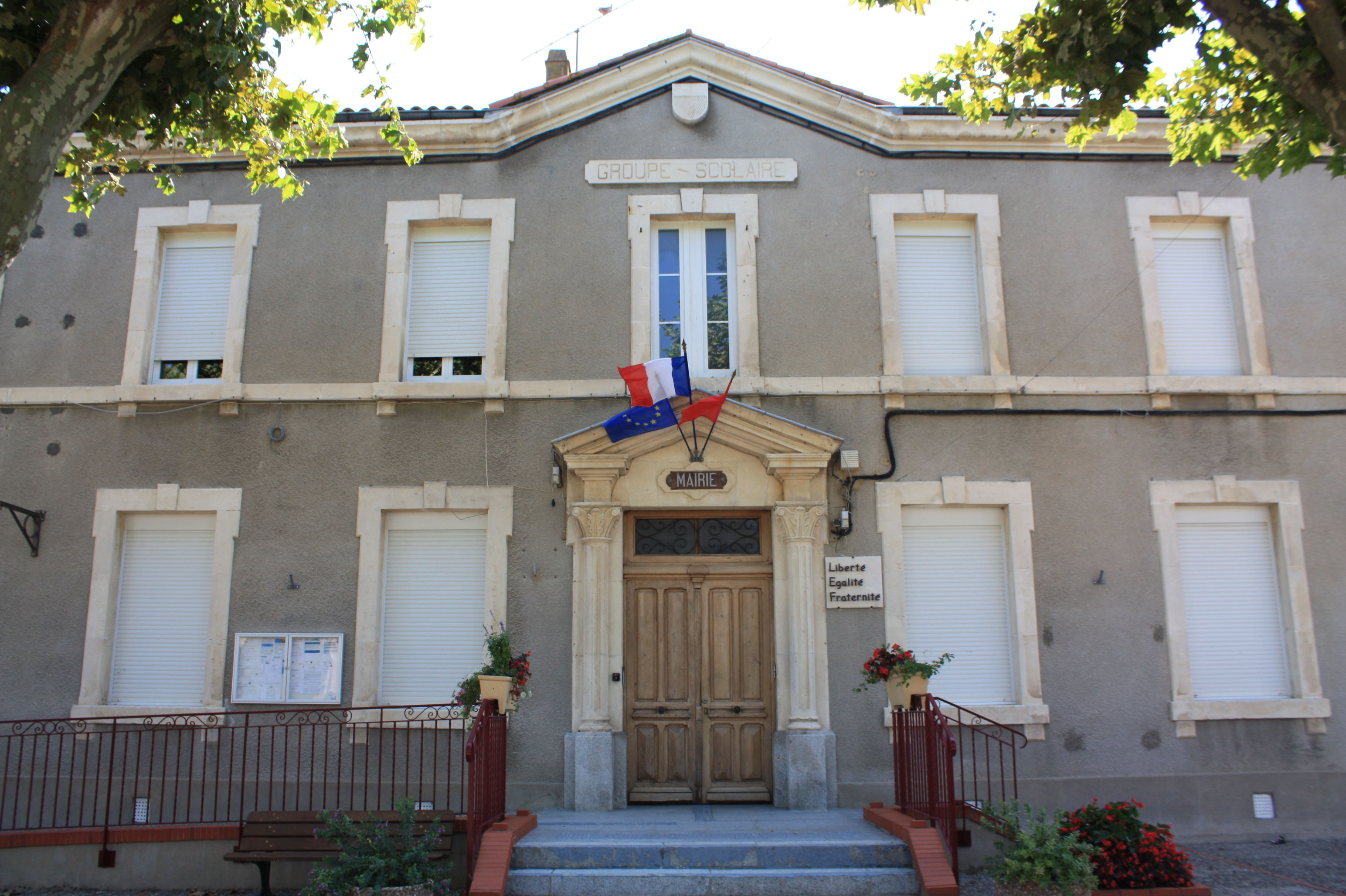
- The town hall in Badens

- Coat of arms
- Location of Badens
- Location within France Location within Occitanie
- Coordinates: 43°13′00″N 2°31′00″E
- Country: France
- Region: Occitania
- Department: Aude
- Arrondissement: Carcassonne
- Canton: La Montagne d'Alaric
- Intercommunality: Carcassonne Agglo

Government
  - Mayor (2020–2026): Alain Estival
- Area^{1}: 9.60 km^{2} (3.71 sq mi)
- Elevation: 80 m (260 ft)
- Highest elevation: 160 m (520 ft)
- Lowest elevation: 61 m (200 ft)
- Population (2023): 749
  - Density: 78.0/km^{2} (202/sq mi)
- Time zone: UTC+01:00 (CET)
  - Summer (DST): UTC+02:00 (CEST)
- INSEE/Postal code: 11023 /11800
- ^{1} French Land Register data, which excludes lakes, ponds, glaciers > 1 km^{2} (0.386 sq mi or 247 acres) and river estuaries.

Badens is a commune in the Aude department in the Occitanie region of southern France.

== Geography ==
Badens is located some 12 km east of Carcassonne and 3 km north of Floure. Access to the commune is by the D206 road from Rustiques in the west which passes through the centre of the commune and the village and continues north-east to Aigues-Vives. The D235 passes through the north of the commune as it goes from Rustiques to join the D135 south-west of Laure-Minervois. The D157 road comes from Marseillette in the south-east through the village and continues north—west to join the D235 in the commune. The D535 goes south from the village to join the D610 just south of the commune. The commune is entirely farmland.

The Ruisseau de Trachaman flows from the north of the commune joining the Ruisseau de Buadelle and continuing south-east to the Ruisseau de Réals which flows east out of the commune. The Ruisseau Maire rises in the west and flows east joining the Ruisseau de Canet which flows east through the village to join the Ruisseau Neuf near Aigues-Vives. The Ruisseau de l'Aqueduc forms the southern border of the commune as it flows east to join the Canal du Midi south-west of the commune.

== History ==
The oldest written mention of Badens is dated November 993 as Villa Badencus in an exchange between Udulgarius, abbot of Caunes, and Roger De Trencavel, Viscount of Carcassonne, concerning Aquaviva which later became Aigues-Vives, a neighbouring village that still exists today.

In 1993 Badens celebrated its 1000 years of existence. On this occasion the village baker baked a cake he called The Millennium. All residents were clothed in medieval costumes and children dressed as knights fought in choreography under the eyes of parents. At the time the commune invited everybody in France called Badens or Ferret to participate in the event and edited a book on the history of the town and with a map of France showing the location of the Badens surnames in France.

=== Heraldry ===
| Arms of Badens | Blazon: Vert, in chief Argent. |

== Administration ==
List of Successive Mayors

Mayors from the French Revolution to 1929

| From | To | Name |
|---|---|---|
| 1790 | 1791 | Paulin Cathary |
| 1791 | 1792 | Bernard Gieulles |
| 1792 | 1793 | Georges Degrand |
| 1793 | 1794 | Guillaume Cathary |
| 1794 | 1800 | Paulin Cathary |
| 1800 | 1813 | Georges Degrand |
| 1813 | 1828 | Barthémély Caffort |
| 1828 | 1864 | Georges Boyer |
| 1864 | 1870 | Léo Boyer |
| 1870 | 1871 | Antoine Cathary |
| 1871 | 1876 | Raymond Ferret |
| 1876 | 1877 | Antoine Cathary |
| 1877 | 1877 | Raymond Ferret |
| 1877 | 1888 | Antoine Cathery |
| 1888 | 1892 | Aimé Caffort |
| 1892 | 1900 | Jean Poudou |
| 1900 | 1904 | Paul Reverdy |
| 1904 | 1907 | Jacques Martignole |
| 1907 | 1929 | Joseph Bon |

Mayors from 1929

| From | To | Name |
|---|---|---|
| 1929 | 1944 | Raymond Ferret |
| 1944 | 1945 | Urbain Pascal |
| 1945 | 1965 | Jules Mahoux |
| 1965 | 1983 | Jean Poudou |
| 1983 | 2014 | Robert Alric |
| 2014 | 2026 | Alain Estival |

== Demography ==
The inhabitants of the commune are known as Badenois or Badenoises in French.

Historical population

| Year | Pop. | ±% p.a. |
|---|---|---|
| 1793 | 209 | — |
| 1821 | 281 | +1.06% |
| 1846 | 358 | +0.97% |
| 1872 | 380 | +0.23% |
| 1901 | 550 | +1.28% |
| 1926 | 602 | +0.36% |
| 1946 | 565 | −0.32% |
| 1962 | 545 | −0.22% |
| 1968 | 662 | +3.29% |

| Year | Pop. | ±% p.a. |
|---|---|---|
| 1975 | 519 | −3.42% |
| 1982 | 554 | +0.94% |
| 1990 | 570 | +0.36% |
| 1999 | 626 | +1.05% |
| 2007 | 756 | +2.39% |
| 2012 | 763 | +0.18% |
| 2017 | 785 | +0.57% |
| 2023 | 749 | −0.78% |

Source: EHESS and INSEE

== Sites and monuments ==
- The Parish Church of Saint-Eulalie (13th century) is registered as an historical monument. The Church contains several items that are registered as historical objects:
  - A Ciborium (19th century)
  - A Chalice with Paten (19th century)
  - A Bronze Bell (1598)
  - 6 carved Corbels (13th century)
- The Clinic of Miremont contains a Statue of the Virgin and child (14th century) which is registered as an historical object.

== Notable people linked to the commune ==
- Georges Guille born in Badens on 20 July 1909, died in Toulouse 16 November 1985.
- Gerald Branca, son of Commandant Napoleon Branca, born at his father's garrison in Sedan (Ardennes) on 29 December 1902 but a true child of Badens.
- Henri Gout (1876–1953), politician
- Gabriel Baptiste Dupac, Marquis of Badens, was born in Badens on 2 October 1737, died in Paris on 29 April 1829. The last Lord of Badens, a former officer of infantry, imbued with his inflexible haughty prerogatives. On 26 March 1789 he was elected member of the nobility in the Estates General by the nobility of the Seneschal of Carcassonne. He sat on the far right and was opposed to all ideas of reform, concession, or Revolution. During the night of 4 August 1789 he protested against the abolition of privileges. On 10 February 1790 he resigned his position as deputy. He emigrated in turn to Chambéry, England, then Poland. He returned to Paris in 1800 with Louis XVIII. In 1813 he made a request to the Council of State to recover his domain of Mirausse and his lands in the Aigues-Vives commune that was confiscated and sold as national assets. He was married to Marie-Anne de Bruyeres de Chalabre and had three children:
  - Gabriel-Paul-Marie, born on 13 May 1770 in Badens, conducted a military career, died on 28 December 1869 in Nice aged 100 years.
  - Marie-Gabrielle Fortunée, born on 6 June 1772 in Badens, wife of Bernard-Emmanuel-Jacques de Roux d'Alzonne, Marquis of Puivert, died on 28 September 1836 in Dieppe .
  - Louise-Eleonore-Perrette, born on 8 September 1773 in Badens.

== See also ==
- Communes of the Aude department
