= Canons Regular of the Mother of God =

Roman Catholic Order of Canons Regular

- Chanoines Réguliers de la Mère de Dieu; Canonici Regulares Matris Dei
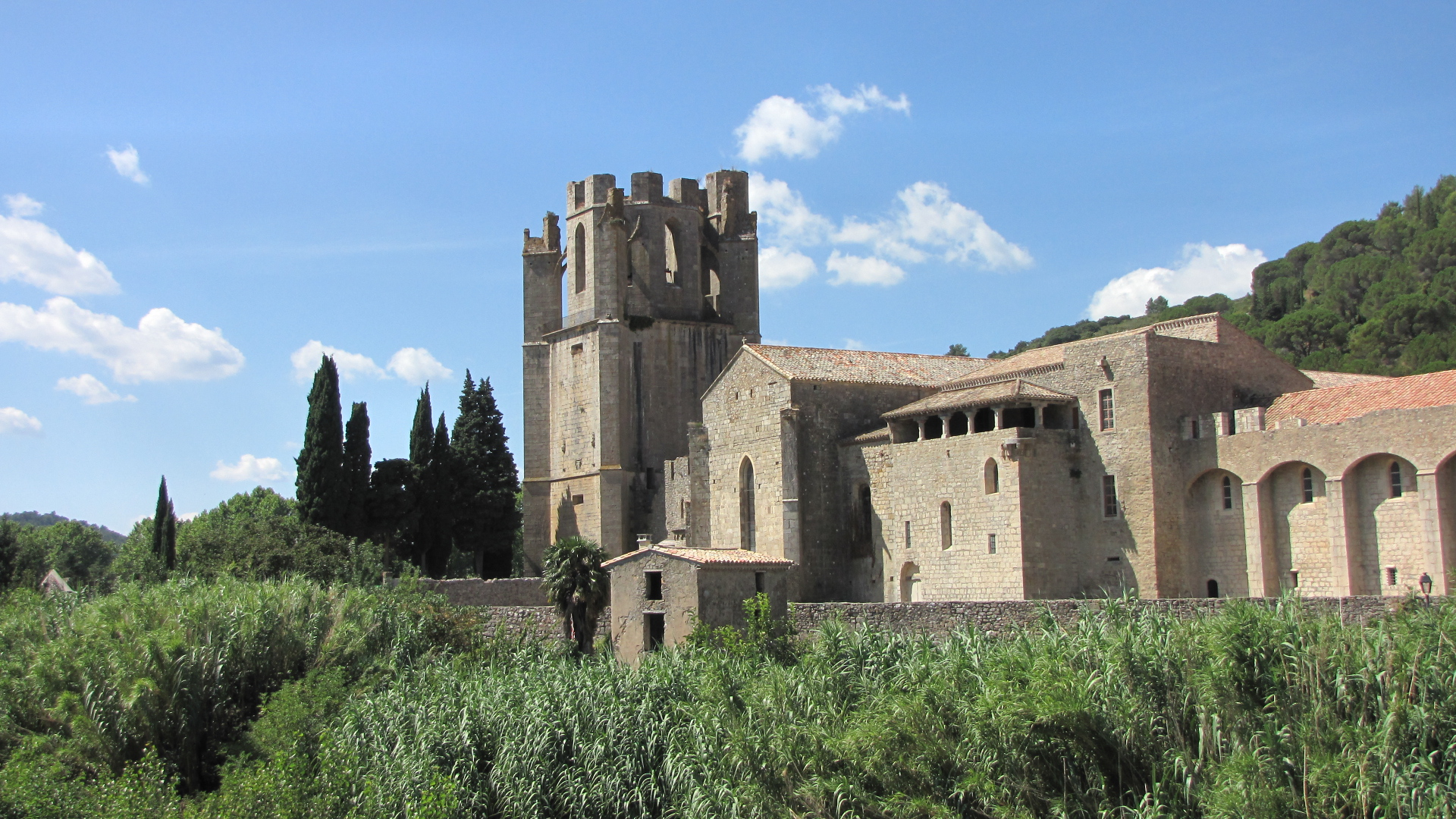
- Abbey of Lagrasse
- Abbreviation: C.R.M.D
- Formation: 1969; 57 years ago
- Type: Catholic religious order Religious Institute of Pontifical Right; Canons Regular
- Headquarters: Lagrasse Abbey
- Members: 39
- Abbot: Emmanuel-Marie Le Fébure du Bus
- Main organ: Confederation of the Canons Regular of St. Augustine
- Parent organization: Catholic Church
- Website: www.lagrasse.org

The Canons Regular of the Mother of God (French: Chanoines Réguliers de la Mère de Dieu; Latin: Canonici Regulares Matris Dei), also known as Canons of Lagrasse (French: Chanoines de Lagrasse), is a Roman Catholic Male religious Order of Canons Regular under the Rule of St. Augustine.

Since 2004, the community has been based in the Lagrasse Abbey located in the Diocese of Carcassonne-Narbonne in France. Together with a female branch based in Azille, they form the Canonical Family of the Mother of God.

The community is also the member of the Confederation of the Canons Regular of St. Augustine.

== History ==
Founded in 1969, the community was first located in Moissac for about 15 years, then they moved to Gap at the Monastery of the Sacred Heart of Mary.

In 1997, the community was elevated to the rank of Abbey by Pope John Paul II, the community's superior received the abbatial blessing from Cardinal Paul Augustin Mayer in the Papal Basilica of St. Paul Outside the Walls in Rome.

In 2004, the community moved to Abbey of St. Mary in Lagrasse.

As of 2023, the community has 39 members, including 23 priests, 8 seminarians, and 8 brothers.

In May 2023, the community launched their beer production, after the beer production from the Abbey of Fontenelle in Normandy, thus Lagrasse becomes the second French Abbey to have its own beer production by the community members.

== Liturgy ==
The Canons Regular of the Mother of God have obtained permission to use the liturgical books of 1962 for everything concerning the Holy Mass and the Divine Office, according to the motu proprio Ecclesia Dei.

Therefore, they are one of the few remaining religious communities in the Roman Catholic Church still uses the Extraordinary Form of the Roman Rite also known as Tridentine Rite, for celebrating the Holy Mass, singing the Gregorian Chant, and praying the Divine Office.

== Habit ==
The community has its own habit design, which is similar to that habit design of the Premonstratensians. They wear a white tunic, white cincture, and a white long scapular.

During liturgical ceremonies, they wear a white surplice and a white mozzetta. They also sometimes wear a detachable white hood.

== Canonesses Regular ==
In 2000, the female branch of Canons Regular of the Mother of God was founded as a Religious Institute of Pontifical Right under the name of the "Canonesses Regular of the Mother of God" (French: Chanoinesses de la Mère de Dieu), also known as "Sisters of Azille" (French: Sœurs d'Azille).

In 2001, the Holy See united the two communities into a single association, under the authority of the Abbot of Lagrasse, while allowing the nuns to retain their autonomy.

Since 2008, the nuns are based in a Monastery in Azille, about 20 kilometers north of Lagrasse.

As of 2015, the community of Canonesses Regular of the Mother of God has nearly 20 nuns, living under the Rule of St. Augustine.

== See also ==
- Canons Regular
- Rule of St. Augustine
- Confederation of the Canons Regular of St. Augustine
