= Bagnoles =

Commune in Occitanie, France

- Commune
- Coat of arms
- Location of Bagnoles
- Location within France Location within Occitanie
- Coordinates: 43°16′20″N 2°26′15″E
- Country: France
- Region: Occitania
- Department: Aude
- Arrondissement: Carcassonne
- Canton: Le Haut-Minervois
- Intercommunality: Carcassonne Agglo

Government
  - Mayor (2020–2026): Henri Toustou
- Area^{1}: 5.63 km^{2} (2.17 sq mi)
- Elevation: 118 m (387 ft)
- Highest elevation: 222 m (728 ft)
- Lowest elevation: 110 m (360 ft)
- Population (2023): 300
  - Density: 53/km^{2} (140/sq mi)
- Time zone: UTC+01:00 (CET)
  - Summer (DST): UTC+02:00 (CEST)
- INSEE/Postal code: 11025 /11600
- ^{1} French Land Register data, which excludes lakes, ponds, glaciers > 1 km^{2} (0.386 sq mi or 247 acres) and river estuaries.

Bagnoles (French pronunciation: [baɲɔl]; Occitan: Banhòlas) is a commune in the Aude department in the Occitanie region of southern France.

== Geography ==
Bagnoles is located some 10 km north-east of Carcassonne just east of Conques-sur-Orbiel. Access to the commune is by the D35 road from Conques-sur-Orbiel which passes through the village and continues north-east to Villarzel-Cabardès. The D37 comes from Malves-en-Minervois in the south and passes through the village before continuing north to join the D620 which continues to Villegly. The east of the commune is forested with the remaining two-thirds of the commune farmland.

The Clamoux river flows from north to south through the commune passing through the village then forming part of the south-western border as it flows south to join the Orbiel west of Bouilhonnac. Several streams rise in the east of the commune and flow west to join the Clamoux including the Ruisseau de la Clauze and the Ruisseau de Picharelle which forms part of the southern border of the commune.

=== Heraldry ===
Arms of Bagnoles	The official status of the blazon remains to be determined. Blazon: Gules, a roundel Argent.

== Administration ==
List of Successive Mayors

From	To	Name
2001	2008	Georges Escande
2008	2020	Serge Sarran
2020	2026	Henri Toustou

== Demography ==
The inhabitants of the commune are known as Bagnolois or Bagnoloises in French.

Historical population

Year	Pop.	±% p.a.
1793	238	—
1821	285	+0.65%
1846	203	−1.35%
1872	218	+0.27%
1901	190	−0.47%
1926	233	+0.82%
1946	224	−0.20%
1962	223	−0.03%
1968	210	−1.00%

Year	Pop.	±% p.a.
1975	211	+0.07%
1982	216	+0.34%
1990	198	−1.08%
1999	188	−0.57%
2007	189	+0.07%
2012	274	+7.71%
2017	308	+2.37%
2023	300	−0.44%

Source: EHESS and INSEE

== Economy ==
Bagnoles is located in the Indication géographique protégée (Protected Geographic Zone) (IGP) for Languedoc-Roussillon wine for Coteaux-de-Peyriac.

== See also ==
- Communes of the Aude department

=== External links ===
- Bagnoles on the old National Geographic Institute website (in French)
- Bagnoles on Géoportail, National Geographic Institute (IGN) website (in French)
- Bagniolles on the 1750 Cassini Map
