= Lespinassière =

Commune in Occitanie, France

- Commune
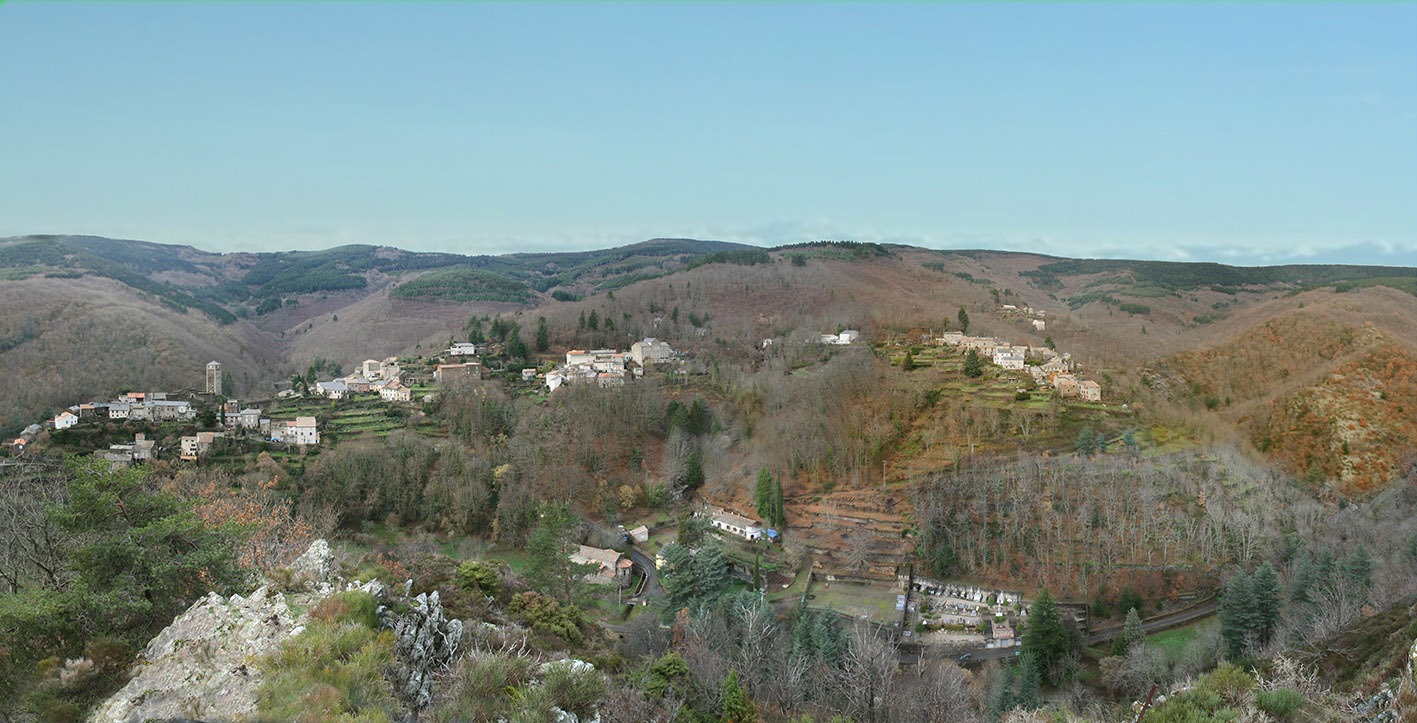
- A general view of Lespinassière

- Coat of arms
- Location of Lespinassière
- Location within France Location within Occitanie
- Coordinates: 43°24′13″N 2°32′16″E
- Country: France
- Region: Occitania
- Department: Aude
- Arrondissement: Carcassonne
- Canton: Le Haut-Minervois
- Intercommunality: Carcassonne Agglo

Government
  - Mayor (2020–2026): Charles Lucet
- Area^{1}: 16.24 km^{2} (6.27 sq mi)
- Elevation: 500 m (1,600 ft)
- Highest elevation: 1,045 m (3,428 ft)
- Lowest elevation: 416 m (1,365 ft)
- Population (2023): 139
  - Density: 8.56/km^{2} (22.2/sq mi)
- Time zone: UTC+01:00 (CET)
  - Summer (DST): UTC+02:00 (CEST)
- INSEE/Postal code: 11200 /11160
- ^{1} French Land Register data, which excludes lakes, ponds, glaciers > 1 km^{2} (0.386 sq mi or 247 acres) and river estuaries.

Lespinassière (French pronunciation: [lɛspinasjɛʁ]; Occitan: Lespinassièra) is a commune in the Aude department in southern France.

== Population ==
Historical population
| Year | Pop. | ±% p.a. |
|---|---|---|
| 1968 | 139 | — |
| 1975 | 90 | −6.02% |
| 1982 | 119 | +4.07% |
| 1990 | 105 | −1.55% |
| 1999 | 90 | −1.70% |
| 2007 | 104 | +1.82% |
| 2012 | 124 | +3.58% |
| 2017 | 133 | +1.41% |
| 2023 | 139 | +0.74% |
Source: INSEE

== See also ==
- Communes of the Aude department
