= Villeneuve-Minervois =

Commune in Occitanie, France

- Commune
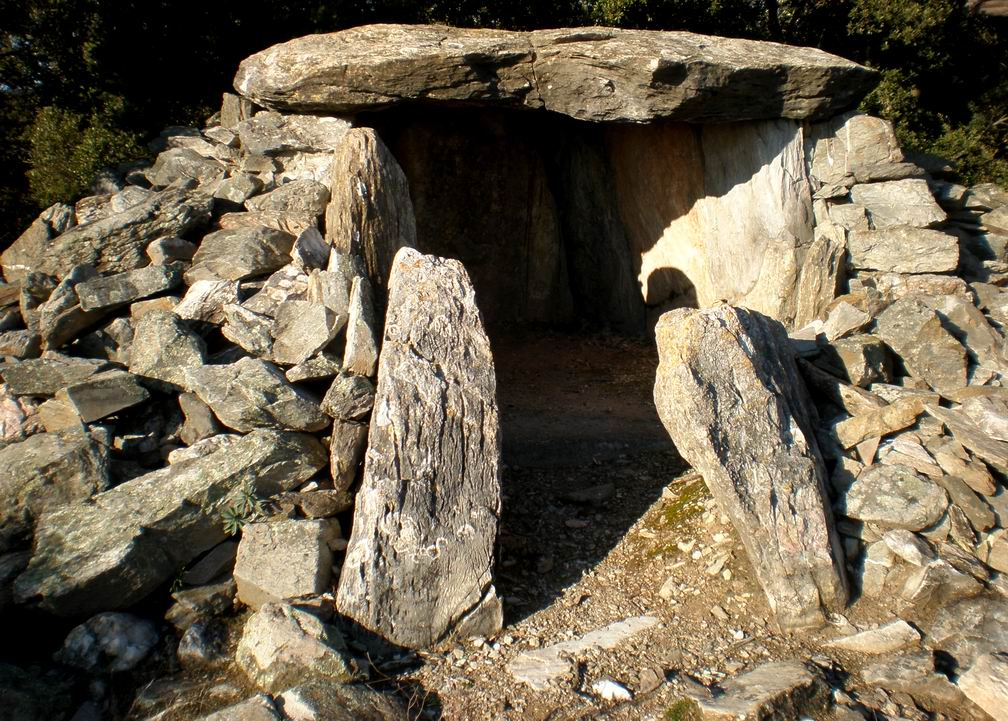
- Dolmen de la Jargantière

- Coat of arms
- Location of Villeneuve-Minervois
- Location within France Location within Occitanie
- Coordinates: 43°18′56″N 2°27′47″E
- Country: France
- Region: Occitania
- Department: Aude
- Arrondissement: Carcassonne
- Canton: Le Haut-Minervois
- Intercommunality: Carcassonne Agglo

Government
  - Mayor (2020–2026): Alain Ginies
- Area^{1}: 23.85 km^{2} (9.21 sq mi)
- Elevation: 183 m (600 ft)
- Highest elevation: 760 m (2,490 ft)
- Lowest elevation: 166 m (545 ft)
- Population (2023): 979
  - Density: 41.0/km^{2} (106/sq mi)
- Time zone: UTC+01:00 (CET)
  - Summer (DST): UTC+02:00 (CEST)
- INSEE/Postal code: 11433 /11160
- ^{1} French Land Register data, which excludes lakes, ponds, glaciers > 1 km^{2} (0.386 sq mi or 247 acres) and river estuaries.

Villeneuve-Minervois is a commune in the Aude department in southern France.

== Population ==
Historical population
Year	Pop.	±% p.a.
1968	1,039	—
1975	976	−0.89%
1982	808	−2.66%
1990	842	+0.52%
1999	824	−0.24%
2007	844	+0.30%
2012	1,073	+4.92%
2017	1,019	−1.03%
2023	979	−0.67%
Source: INSEE

== See also ==
- Communes of the Aude department
