= Aqueduc d'Azille =

- Coordinates: 43.260833°N 2.700833°E
- Carries: Former irrigation waterway
- Crosses: Ruisseau de l'Aiguille
- Locale: Azille
- Official name: Aqueduc d'Azille

Characteristics
- Total length: just under 500 m

History
- Construction start: 1808

Location
- Interactive map of Aqueduc d'Azille

The Aqueduc d'Azille (French for "Aqueduct of Azille") is an aqueduct in the southern French Aude department. It is located south of the Lac de Jouarres at the eastern end of the commune of Azille, but closer to the centre of Homps.

It was built in the 19th century for agricultural irrigation. The Canal du Midi and the Aude are less than one kilometre apart in this area, although the Aude lies at a lower elevation. Water from the canal was conveyed through channels and the aqueduct for irrigation, with surplus water being discharged into the Aude.

The aqueduct is well preserved but little known. It is not mentioned in the relevant inventories and, as of 2026, is not a registered historical monument. It is therefore occasionally referred to as a "forgotten aqueduct" (aqueduc oublié).

It should not be confused with the nearby Aqueduc de l'étang de Jouarres (a registered historical monument) or the Pont-canal de Jouarres, which are canal bridges carrying the Canal du Midi across small watercourses and are also located within the commune of Azille.

== Former watercourse ==
The aqueduct, which is now dry, spans a shallow valley in an east–west direction with 25 to 30 arches over a distance of just under 500 metres. A stream, the Ruisseau de l'Aiguille, runs through the valley. The former direction of flow was from west to east. On both sides, the aqueduct is connected to ground-level, masonry water channels. The western channel carried water from the Canal du Midi, to which it was connected near Cascals. This section has since been filled in. The former outlet via the western water channel leads to the nearby D610 road and passes underneath it before splitting into several branches. South of Homps, unused water flowed into the Aude.

Along the entire route, the water was used for irrigation, beginning at the Domaines de Cascals, then at La Pompe, and finally in the fields south of Homps.

== History ==
Middle section of the aqueduct

Contrary to a claim made on a website, this is not a Roman aqueduct. Research in the archives of the Aude department established that the foundation stone was laid in 1808. Several applications for the flooding of vineyards dating from 1882 and 1883 have survived. At that time, the area was suffering from a severe phylloxera crisis. Phylloxera is a pest that feeds on the roots of grapevines. When vineyards were flooded for a period of 40 days, the insects did not survive.

It is not known when irrigation using the aqueduct was discontinued. At the beginning of the 19th century, many fruit trees were found in the area, but over the course of the century they were cut down in favour of viticulture. Grapevines, by contrast, normally did not require irrigation.
