= Canton of Le Haut-Minervois =

Coordinates: 43.28°N 2.59°E

- Canton
- Situation of the canton of Le Haut-Minervois in the department of Aude
- Country: France
- Region: Occitania
- Department: Aude
- No. of communes: {{{nbcomm}}}
- Population (2023): 15,879
- INSEE code: 1115

The canton of Le Haut-Minervois is an administrative division of the Aude department, southern France. It was created at the French canton reorganisation which came into effect in March 2015. Its seat is in Rieux-Minervois.

It consists of the following communes:

1. Aigues-Vives
2. Azille
3. Bagnoles
4. Cabrespine
5. Castans
6. Caunes-Minervois
7. Citou
8. Laure-Minervois
9. Lespinassière
10. Limousis
11. Pépieux
12. Peyriac-Minervois
13. Puichéric
14. La Redorte
15. Rieux-Minervois
16. Rustiques
17. Saint-Frichoux
18. Sallèles-Cabardès
19. Trassanel
20. Trausse
21. Villarzel-Cabardès
22. Villegly
23. Villeneuve-Minervois
