= Confederation of the Canons Regular of St. Augustine =

- Abbreviation: C.R.S.A.
- Formation: May 4, 1959; 67 years ago
- Founder: Pope John XXIII
- Type: International Association of Canons Regular
- Abbot Primate: Jean Scarcella

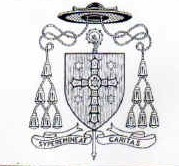
Emblem of the Confederation of Regular Canons of Saint Augustine

The Confederation of the Canons Regular of St. Augustine (Abbreviation: C.R.S.A) is a Roman Catholic international association for the congregation of Canons Regular under the Rule of St. Augustine.

== Description ==
The Confederation of the Canons Regular of St. Augustine was founded in 4 May 1959 during the 900th anniversary of the First Lateran Synod, and approved by an Apostolic Brief "Caritas unitas" by Pope John XXIII.

The Confederation is overseen by the Abbot Primate, appointed for a term of six years. Although serving as a symbolic leader, the Abbot Primate holds no governing authority over the individual congregations

The Current Abbot Primate is Jean Scarcella of the Congregation of St. Maurice of Agaunum, elected in 2022.

== List of the Congregations ==
The Confederation of the Canons Regular is formed by this congregations:

- Canons Regular of the Lateran
- Congregation of St. Nicholas and St. Bernard of Mont Joux
- Congregation of St. Maurice of Agaunum
- Austrian Congregation of Canons Regular
- Congregation of Windesheim
- Canons Regular of the Immaculate Conception
- Congregation of Mary, Mother of the Redeemer
- Congregation of the Brothers of the Common Life
- Congregation of St. Victor
- Canons Regular of the Mother of God

== See also ==
- Canons Regular
- Rule of St. Augustine
