= Henri Gout =

French politician (1876–1953)

Henri Gout (9 November 1876 – 7 December 1953) was a French politician.

Born in Badens (Aude), he studied medicine before becoming involved in politics as a member of the Radical Party. For his services during the First World War he received the Croix de Guerre.

He was elected to the Chamber of Deputies to represent Aude in 1928 and served until 1940. In the Chamber he was interested in public health measures.

Gout was one of the eighty who voted against granting special powers to Marshal Philippe Pétain on 10 July 1940. His opposition to Pétain and Pierre Laval resulted in his expulsion from the Chamber and later house arrest in the Ariège.

After the liberation, he was appointed mayor of Carcassonne, and held the post in the elections of 1945 until 1947. He died at Carcassonne. He was a chevalier of the Légion d'honneur.
