= Saint-Frichoux =

Commune in Occitanie, France

- Commune
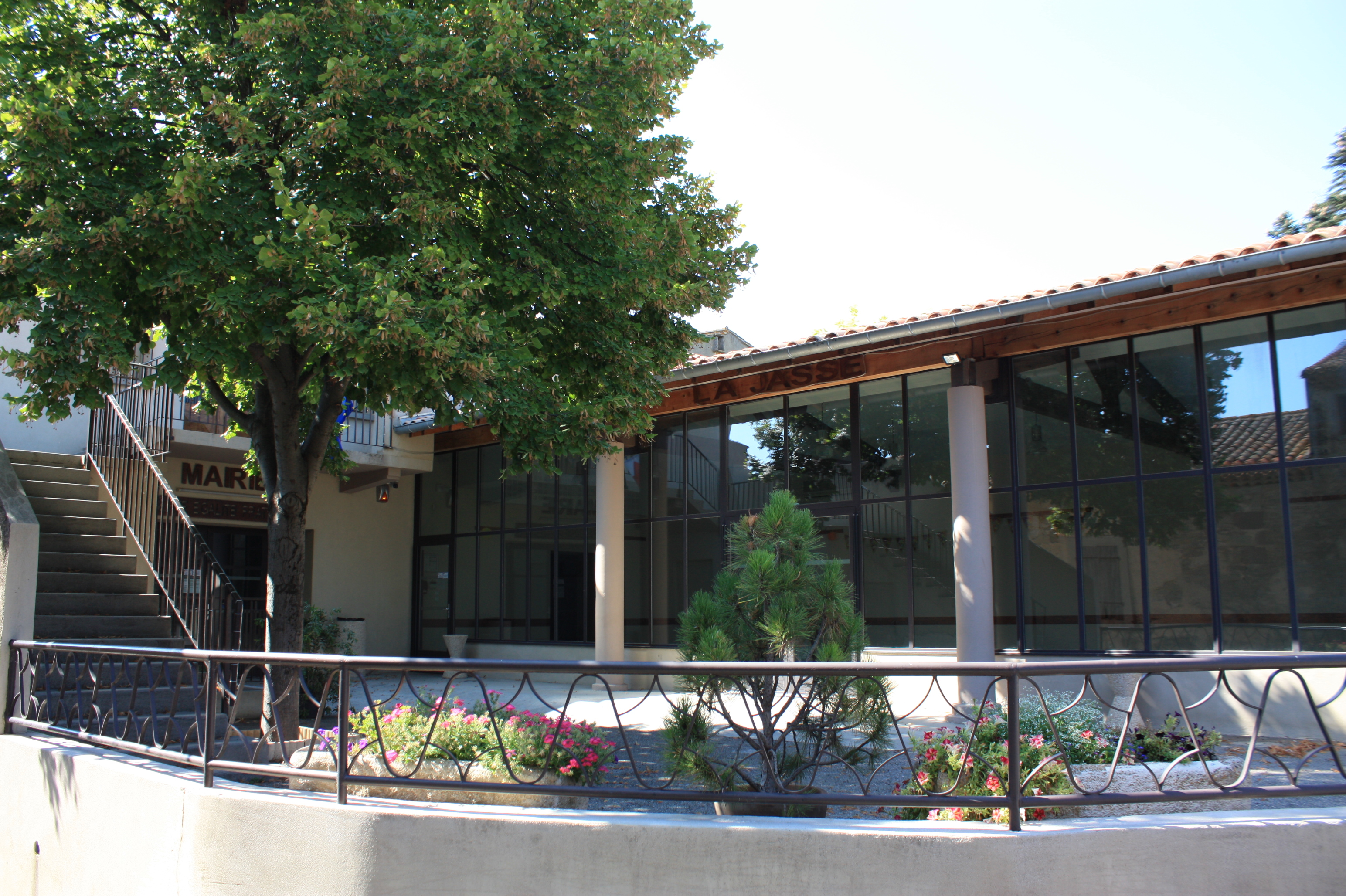
- The town hall in Saint-Frichoux

- Coat of arms
- Location of Saint-Frichoux
- Location within France Location within Occitanie
- Coordinates: 43°15′09″N 2°33′11″E
- Country: France
- Region: Occitania
- Department: Aude
- Arrondissement: Carcassonne
- Canton: Le Haut-Minervois
- Intercommunality: Carcassonne Agglo

Government
  - Mayor (2020–2026): Serge Bérard
- Area^{1}: 6.33 km^{2} (2.44 sq mi)
- Elevation: 125 m (410 ft)
- Highest elevation: 100 m (330 ft)
- Lowest elevation: 51 m (167 ft)
- Population (2023): 224
  - Density: 35.4/km^{2} (91.7/sq mi)
- Time zone: UTC+01:00 (CET)
  - Summer (DST): UTC+02:00 (CEST)
- INSEE/Postal code: 11342 /11800
- ^{1} French Land Register data, which excludes lakes, ponds, glaciers > 1 km^{2} (0.386 sq mi or 247 acres) and river estuaries.

Saint-Frichoux (French pronunciation: [sɛ̃ fʁiʃu]; Occitan: Sant Frichós) is a commune in the Aude department in southern France.

== Population ==
Historical population
Year	Pop.	±% p.a.
1968	215	—
1975	172	−3.14%
1982	172	+0.00%
1990	177	+0.36%
1999	181	+0.25%
2007	219	+2.41%
2012	235	+1.42%
2017	255	+1.65%
2023	224	−2.14%
Source: INSEE

== See also ==
- Communes of the Aude department
