= Lagrasse Abbey =

Abbey in southern France

Coordinates: 43°05′26″N 2°37′01″E

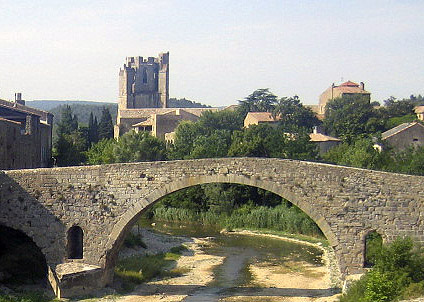
View of the abbey, with the Old Bridge (Pont Vieux) in the foreground. The latter was the only access point from the village during the Middle Ages.

The Abbey of St. Mary of Lagrasse (French: Abbaye Sainte-Marie de Lagrasse or Abbaye Sainte-Marie-d'Orbieu) is a Romanesque abbey in Lagrasse, southern France, whose origins date to the 7th century. It is located in Languedoc, near the Corbières Massif, about 35 km from Carcassonne. It was originally a Benedictine monastery, but since 2004 has been home to a community of canons regular.

== History ==
The monastic community was founded in the 7th century by the abbot of Narbonne, Nimphridius, who adopted the Rule of Saint Benedict. It was elevated to the rank of abbey in 779 and enriched quickly thanks to donations from lords from the neighbourhood and the county of Barcelona, acquiring lands, castles, priories and other assets. During the 12th century it ruled over a large territory encompassing the dioceses of Toulouse and Béziers and the county of Urgell. During the 13th to 15th centuries, it was reinforced and fortified due to the numerous wars, and there was a decline in religious life.

In the 16th century, Philippe de Lévis, the first commendatory abbot of the monastery, initiated the construction of a great bell tower, which was left unfinished after his death in 1537. A revival of its religious life took place in the 17th century, when the monastery joined the Congregation of Saint Maur in 1663. In the 18th century, it benefited from the architectural undertakings of its commendatory abbot, Bishop Armand Bazin de Bezons (1701–1778), enriching it with a ceremonial cour d'honneur and a cloister in classical style.

In 1789, with the beginning of the French Revolution, the abbey was confiscated by the state and sold in two lots. The smaller lot, comprising the medieval part of the abbey, belongs to the Council of the Department of Aude

In 2004, the Canons Regular of the Mother of God, a community of canons regular, moved into Lagrasse Abbey, occupying the larger lot comprising about three quarters of the building. The community, the majority of whom are priests, live in common under the Rule of St. Augustine, and dedicate their lives to the liturgy, which they celebrate in the pre-Vatican II form, and to evangelization. Common life, contemplative life, and apostolic life form the three facets of their charism.

== Architecture ==
The part of the abbey in public ownership comprises the 13th-century abbot's house with a small cloister, the abbot's chapel, the monks' dormitory, the north transept of the church and a lapidary museum.

The Romanesque church was built in the 11th century, with a single nave ending in a presbytery, with a transept and three small apses. There are a new church and a new abbot palace (18th century). Restoration works in the cloister (also from the 18th century) have found remains of an ancient Romanesque portal with a marble sculpted arch, attributed to the Master of Cabestany.

The octagonal bell tower is 40 meters high. The monk’s dormitory features an ogival vault in timber framework.

On-going restoration work, sponsored by the Association for Safeguarding and Enhancing Lagrasse Abbey and the Languedoc-Roussillon Region, won in 2014 the annual award for such work.

== See also ==
- Canons Regular of the Mother of God
