= La Redorte =

Commune in Occitanie, France

- Commune
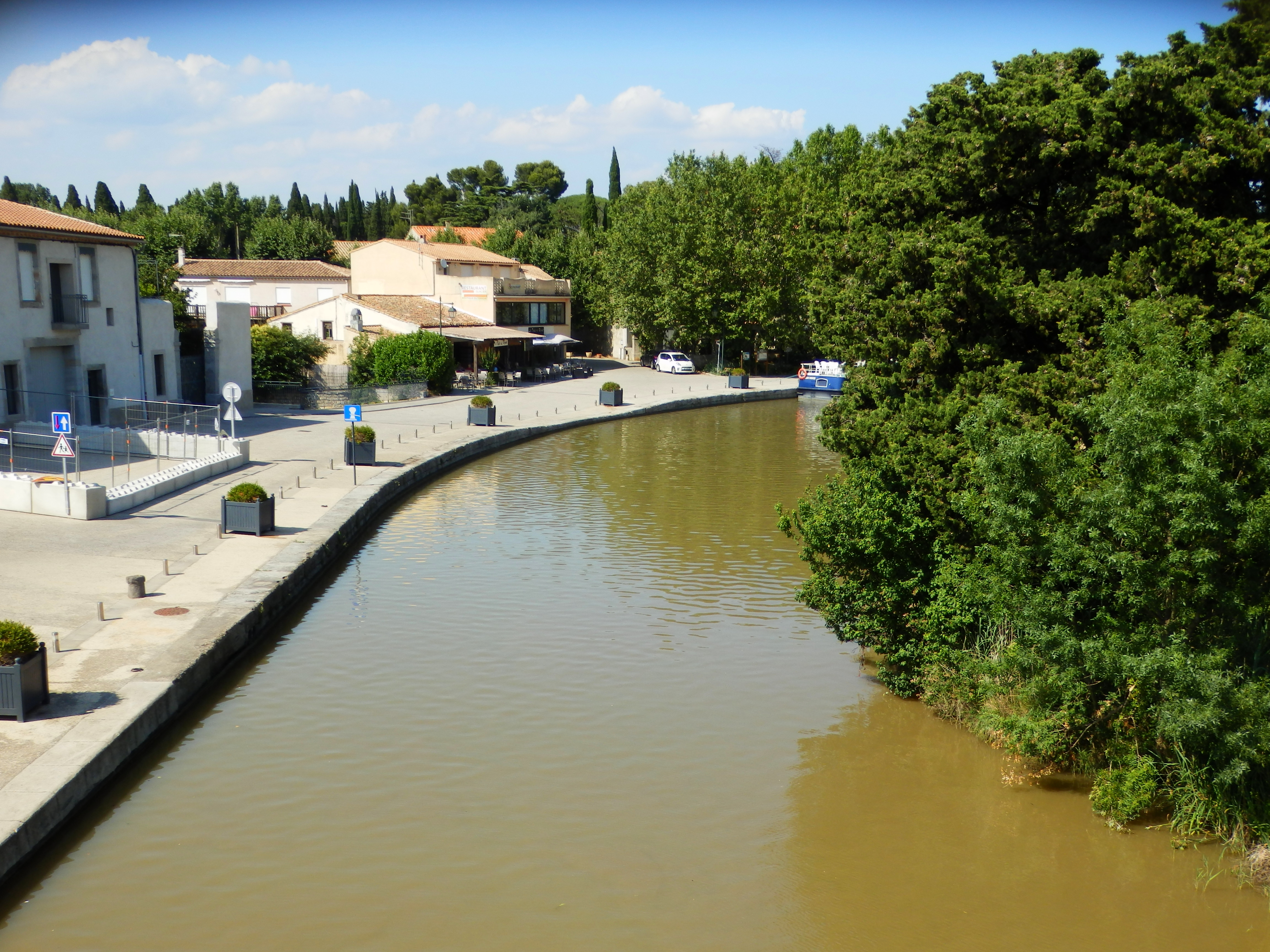
- The Canal du Midi in La Redorte

- Coat of arms
- Location of La Redorte
- Location within France Location within Occitanie
- Coordinates: 43°15′11″N 2°39′14″E
- Country: France
- Region: Occitania
- Department: Aude
- Arrondissement: Carcassonne
- Canton: Le Haut-Minervois
- Intercommunality: Carcassonne Agglo

Government
  - Mayor (2020–2026): Christian Magro
- Area^{1}: 13.49 km^{2} (5.21 sq mi)
- Elevation: 53 m (174 ft)
- Highest elevation: 111 m (364 ft)
- Lowest elevation: 39 m (128 ft)
- Population (2023): 1,238
  - Density: 91.77/km^{2} (237.7/sq mi)
- Time zone: UTC+01:00 (CET)
  - Summer (DST): UTC+02:00 (CEST)
- INSEE/Postal code: 11190 /11700
- ^{1} French Land Register data, which excludes lakes, ponds, glaciers > 1 km^{2} (0.386 sq mi or 247 acres) and river estuaries.

La Redorte (French pronunciation: [la ʁədɔʁt]; Occitan: La Redòrta, before 1993: Laredorte) is a commune in the Aude department in southern France.

== Population ==
Historical population
Year	Pop.	±% p.a.
1968	1,138	—
1975	1,073	−0.84%
1982	1,007	−0.90%
1990	1,032	+0.31%
1999	1,037	+0.05%
2007	1,131	+1.09%
2012	1,119	−0.21%
2017	1,161	+0.74%
2023	1,238	+1.08%
Source: INSEE

== See also ==
- Communes of the Aude department
