= Villegly =

Commune in Occitanie, France

- Commune
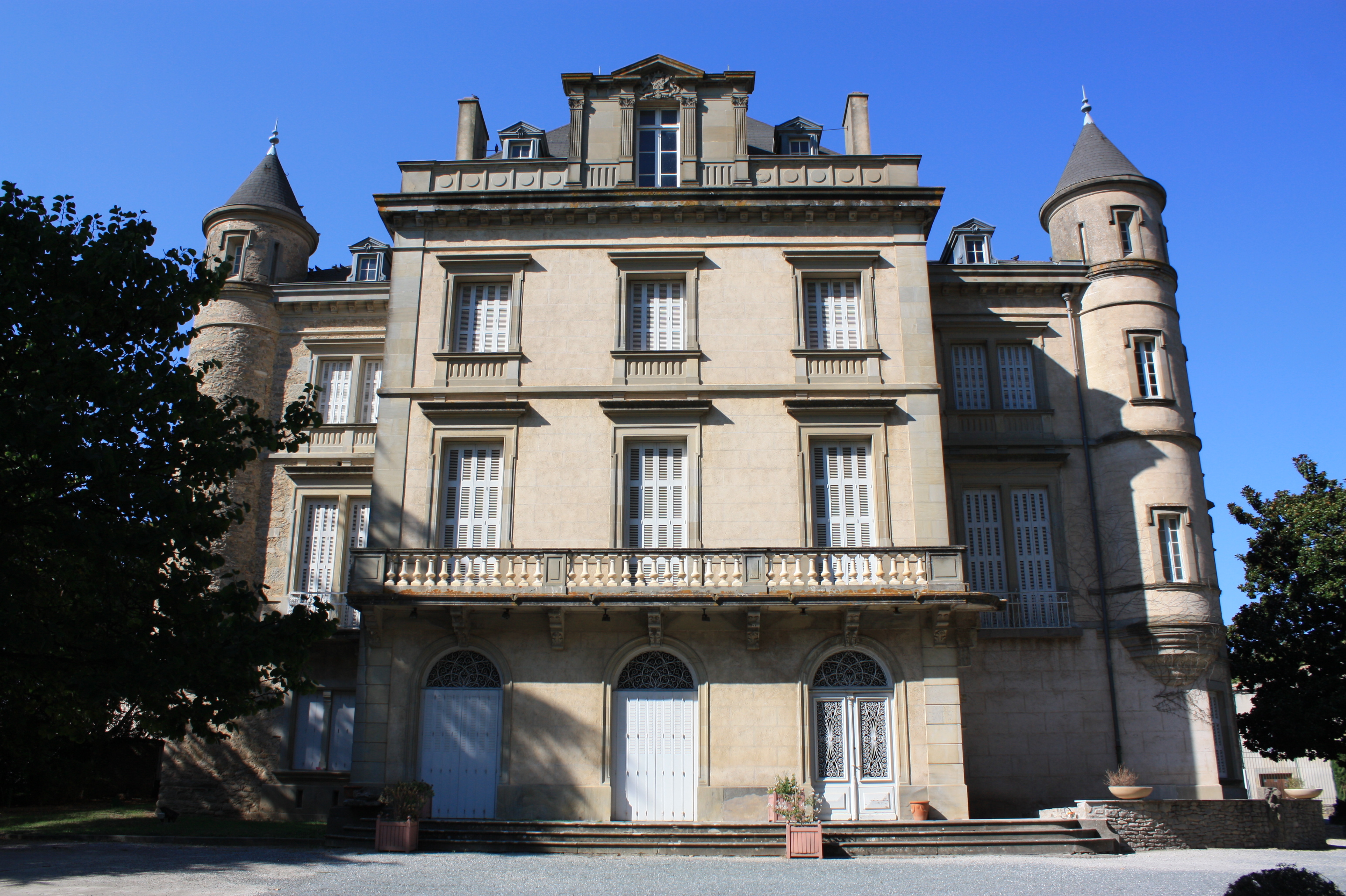
- The chateau in Villegly

- Coat of arms
- Location of Villegly
- Location within France Location within Occitanie
- Coordinates: 43°17′13″N 2°26′27″E
- Country: France
- Region: Occitania
- Department: Aude
- Arrondissement: Carcassonne
- Canton: Le Haut-Minervois
- Intercommunality: Carcassonne Agglo

Government
  - Mayor (2020–2026): Alain Marty
- Area^{1}: 9.83 km^{2} (3.80 sq mi)
- Elevation: 175 m (574 ft)
- Highest elevation: 283 m (928 ft)
- Lowest elevation: 128 m (420 ft)
- Population (2023): 1,247
  - Density: 127/km^{2} (329/sq mi)
- Time zone: UTC+01:00 (CET)
  - Summer (DST): UTC+02:00 (CEST)
- INSEE/Postal code: 11426 /11600
- ^{1} French Land Register data, which excludes lakes, ponds, glaciers > 1 km^{2} (0.386 sq mi or 247 acres) and river estuaries.

Villegly (French pronunciation: [vilɡli]; Occitan: Vilaglin) is a commune in the Aude department in southern France.

== Geography ==
Villegly is a village at the edge of the Minervois area at the confluence of two streams, the Clamoux and the Seize (also spelt Ceize). It is about 14 km north-east of Carcassonne on the D620. The commune sits on the lowest foothills of the Montagne Noire at about 200 metres above sea level and has an area of 983 hectares.

== History ==
Evidence of many periods of its history can be seen in the buildings of Villegly. The mediaeval Château de Villegly has been restored many times and demonstrates the architecture of the Renaissance and the Fin de siècle periods. The church has a thirteenth-century bell tower. The Place de la Fontaine and Place de l’Arounel, shaded by plane trees, may indicate the former location of the moat of the château. There is an eighteenth-century fountain in the Place de la Fontaine. The picturesque, narrow village streets, especially in this central part of the village, contain houses dating back to at least the 17th century, as evidenced by dated stone lintels from 1663 (2, Place de l'Eglise) and 1747 (7, Rue de la Fontaine Fraiche).

== Administration ==
List of mayors
Term	Name
1945–1947	Jules Rouquet
1947	Augustin Granel
1947–1953	Aimé Rey
1953–1959	Edouard Milhabet
1959–1989	Jean Pennavaire
1989–incumbent	Alain Marty

== Population ==
Historical population
Year	Pop.	±% p.a.
1968	514	—
1975	449	−1.91%
1982	532	+2.45%
1990	611	+1.75%
1999	747	+2.26%
2007	860	+1.78%
2012	1,072	+4.51%
2017	1,134	+1.13%
2023	1,247	+1.60%
Source: INSEE

Its inhabitants are called Villeglygeois.

== Services ==
The village has a post office (open three days per week), one newsagent, one butcher, one baker and one grocery shop. There is also a campsite. The grounds of the old Château de Villegly are a pleasant public park.

== Wines ==
The main economic activity of the commune is wine production. Vines cover most of the land outside the village itself. When the old Château de Villegly came under the ownership of the Conseil Général of the Département de l'Aude, its vineyards and cellars were bought by Marcel Moureau. He and his sons run the business which also includes the vineyards of Chateau Villerambert-Moreau at Caunes-Minervois. The Château de Villegly label is an excellent Minervois AOC wine.

At the northeast end of the village, the young husband and wife team of Annabelle et Christophe Hernandez have set up the Domaine les Maillols vineyard which produces an excellent range of Vin de Pays and Minervois AOC wines.

Both the above wine businesses have tasting cellars in Villegly.

== See also ==
- Communes of the Aude department
