= Antoine Sabarthès =

French ecclesiastic, writer and historian

Canon or abbot Antoine Sabarthès, full name Antoine Auguste Sabarthès, (27 May 1854 – 19 February 1944) was a French ecclesiastic, writer and historian, a specialist of the Aude department.

== Biography ==
A poorly publicized figure, not much is known about the life of Abbé Sabarthès, who lived until his 90th birthday. Only his works will be taken from him.

He entered the seminary in Carcassonne, where he studied and was ordained in 1878. He became a priest of the diocese of Carcassonne. After several assignments in villages, he devoted himself to the study of society, the church and the territories administered by it; He published several works in Latin, Occitan and French.

== Historian ==
Nowadays, Sabarthès is synonymous with reference for all that concerns the Aude department. He was a member of numerous Société Savantes de France, an adherent and publicist for many years to the "Société d'études scientifiques de l'Aude", the "Comité des travaux historiques et scientifiques", the "Société des Arts et Sciences de Carcassonne" and the "Commission archéologique et littéraire de Narbonne".

He began by publishing numerous essays on his work in the drafting stage, limited to specific subjects, but his major work is undoubtedly the Dictionnaire topographique du département de l'Aude published in 1912, providing details on all the cantons and villages of the department, from archival works now missing, making the correspondences between the ancient and modern names of the places.

== Main publications ==
- 1891: La Statue de Notre-Dame de Fontfroide
- 1893: Étude historique sur l'Abbaye de Saint-Paul de Narbonne
- 1895: Le dernier Livre vert de l'archevêque de Narbonne
- 1895: Ordre de Saint-Jean de Jérusalem ou de Malte, la Commanderie de Narbonne
- 1896: La Leude de Montréal
- 1897: Les Coutumes, libertés et franchises de Montréal
- 1901: Une date et un nom à rectifier dans la liste chronologique des abbés de Saint-Paul de Narbonne
- 1902: Inventaire des droits et revenus de l'évêché de Saint-Papoul
- 1902: Charte communale de Fendeille
- 1903: Le Concile d'Attilian
- 1904: Donation de Floranus et d'Anseria à l'Abbaye de Lagrasse
- 1904: Les Libertés et coutumes de Pexiora
- 1904: Étude sur les noms de baptême à Leucate
- 1905: Les Évêchés de la Narbonnaise en 678
- 1907: Les Abbayes de St-Laurent dans le Narbonnais
- 1907: Essai sur la toponymie de l'Aude, qui réunit : «Étude sur la toponomastique de l'Aude» et «Essai sur les cours d'eau du département de l'Aude»
- 1912: Dictionnaire topographique du département de l'Aude
- 1914: Bibliographie de l'Aude
- 1920: Cabrespine (Aude), Cabrières (Hérault)
- 1920: Les seigneurs de Palaja au XIIIe et au XIVe siècle
- 1924: Trois chartes de la commune de Limoux
- 1924: Le Couvent des Clarisses de Carcassonne
- 1930: Les manuscrits consulaires de Limoux, Aude
- 1939: Histoire du clergé de l'Aude de 1789 à 1803
- 1941: Les Saintes reliques conservées dans l'église Saint-Martin de Limoux

== Trivia ==
The Académie des inscriptions et belles-lettres awarded him the first medal of the competition Antiquités nationales de la France, for his work on les manuscrits consulaires de Limoux published in 1930.
