= Rustiques =

Commune in Occitanie, France

- Commune
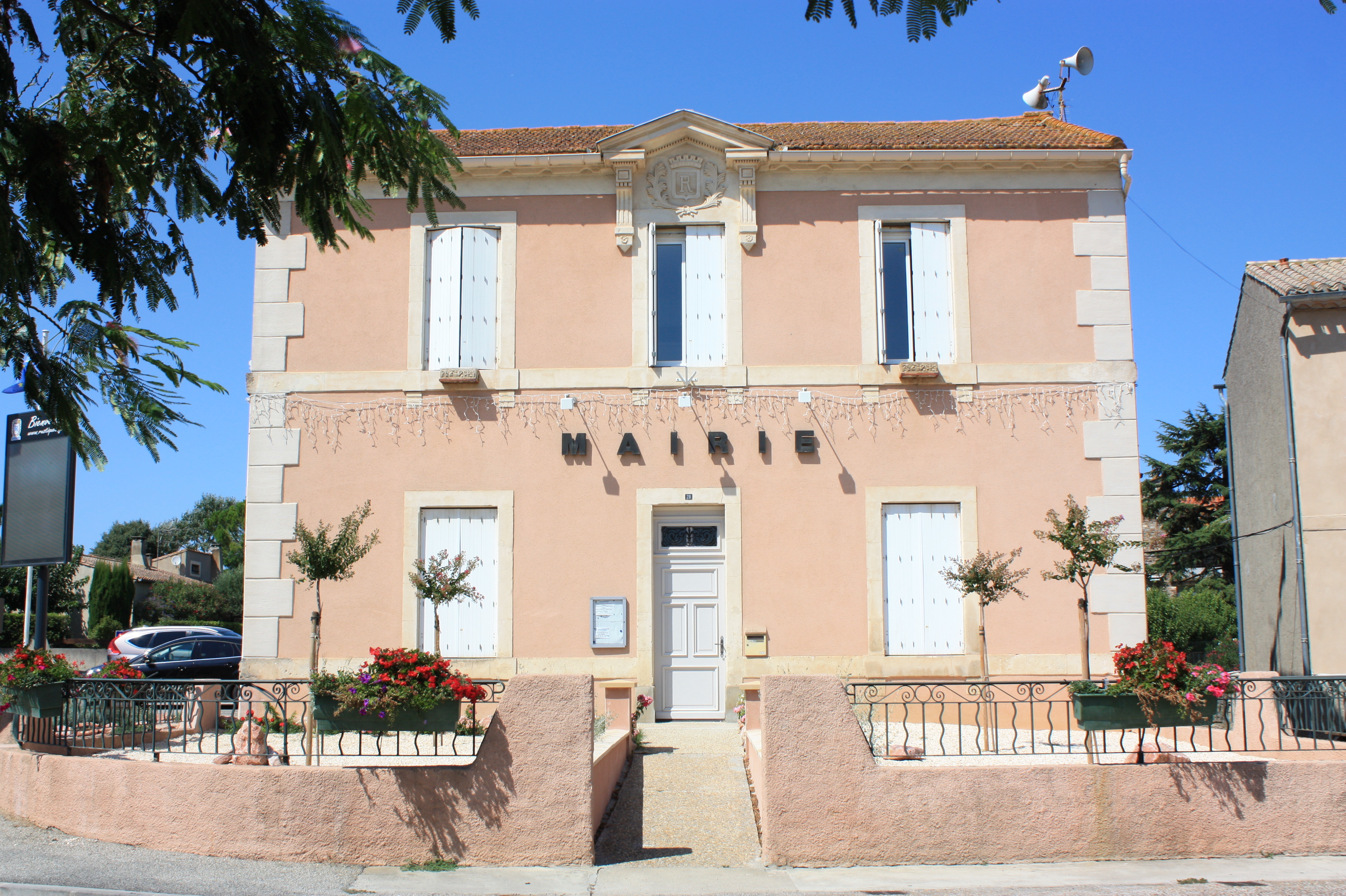
- The town hall in Rustiques

- Coat of arms
- Location of Rustiques
- Location within France Location within Occitanie
- Coordinates: 43°13′01″N 2°28′26″E
- Country: France
- Region: Occitania
- Department: Aude
- Arrondissement: Carcassonne
- Canton: Le Haut-Minervois
- Intercommunality: Carcassonne Agglo

Government
  - Mayor (2020–2026): Henri Ruffel
- Area^{1}: 6.47 km^{2} (2.50 sq mi)
- Elevation: 95 m (312 ft)
- Highest elevation: 161 m (528 ft)
- Lowest elevation: 90 m (300 ft)
- Population (2023): 538
  - Density: 83.2/km^{2} (215/sq mi)
- Time zone: UTC+01:00 (CET)
  - Summer (DST): UTC+02:00 (CEST)
- INSEE/Postal code: 11330 /11800
- ^{1} French Land Register data, which excludes lakes, ponds, glaciers > 1 km^{2} (0.386 sq mi or 247 acres) and river estuaries.

Rustiques (French pronunciation: [ʁystik]; Occitan: Rosticas) is a commune in the Aude department in southern France.

== Population ==
Historical population
Year	Pop.	±% p.a.
1968	229	—
1975	214	−0.96%
1982	231	+1.10%
1990	301	+3.36%
1999	305	+0.15%
2007	430	+4.39%
2012	502	+3.14%
2017	507	+0.20%
2023	538	+0.99%
Source: INSEE

== See also ==
- Communes of the Aude department
