= Villarzel-Cabardès =

Commune in Occitanie, France

- Commune
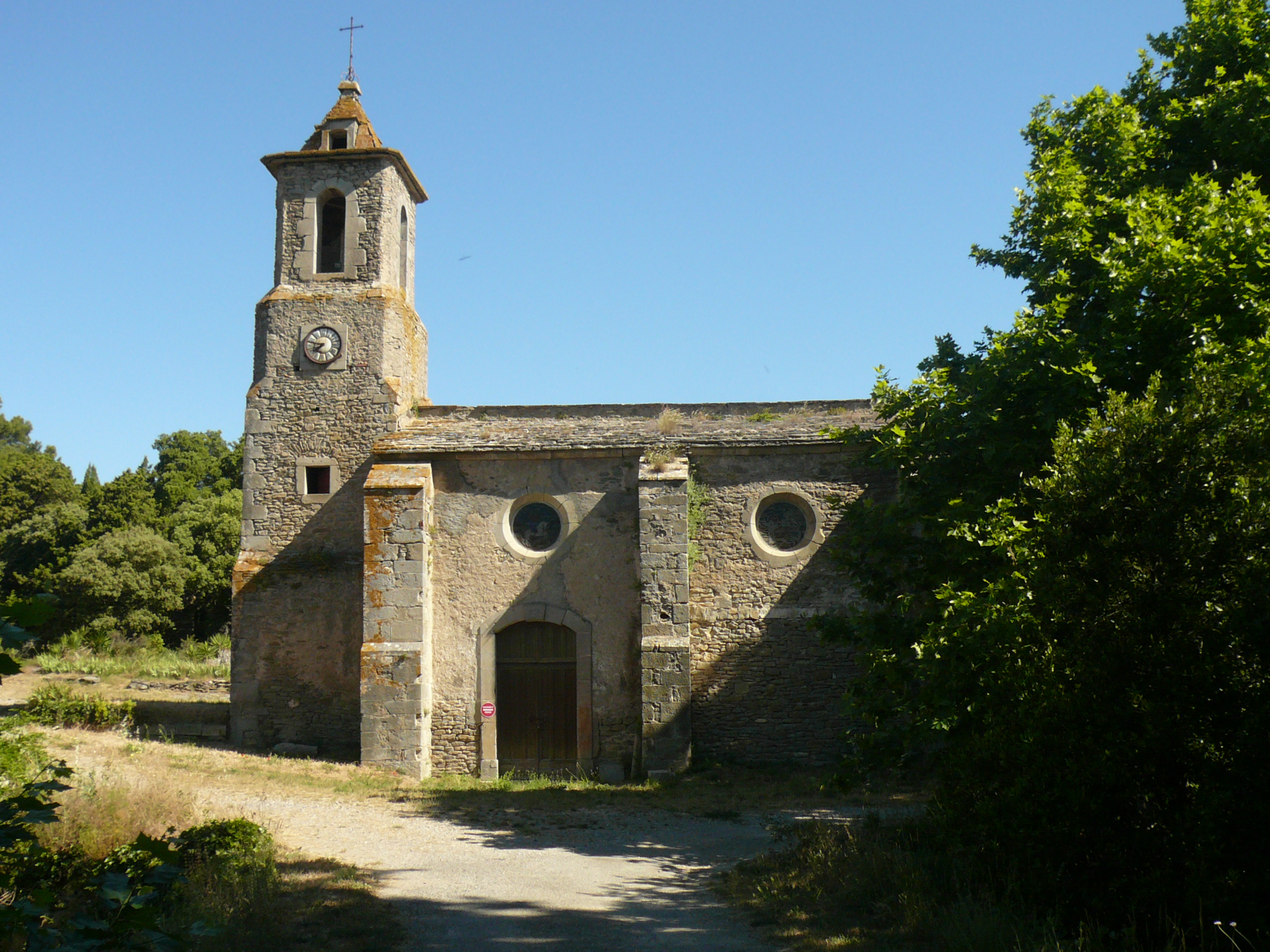
- The church in Villarzel-Cabardès

- Coat of arms
- Location of Villarzel-Cabardès
- Location within France Location within Occitanie
- Coordinates: 43°16′48″N 2°27′37″E
- Country: France
- Region: Occitania
- Department: Aude
- Arrondissement: Carcassonne
- Canton: Le Haut-Minervois
- Intercommunality: Carcassonne Agglo

Government
  - Mayor (2020–2026): André Pujol
- Area^{1}: 6.38 km^{2} (2.46 sq mi)
- Elevation: 200 m (660 ft)
- Highest elevation: 242 m (794 ft)
- Lowest elevation: 119 m (390 ft)
- Population (2023): 276
  - Density: 43.3/km^{2} (112/sq mi)
- Time zone: UTC+01:00 (CET)
  - Summer (DST): UTC+02:00 (CEST)
- INSEE/Postal code: 11416 /11600
- ^{1} French Land Register data, which excludes lakes, ponds, glaciers > 1 km^{2} (0.386 sq mi or 247 acres) and river estuaries.

Villarzel-Cabardès is a commune in the Aude department in southern France.

== Population ==
Historical population
Year	Pop.	±% p.a.
1968	156	—
1975	144	−1.14%
1982	131	−1.34%
1990	130	−0.10%
1999	145	+1.22%
2007	173	+2.23%
2012	208	+3.75%
2017	238	+2.73%
2023	276	+2.50%
Source: INSEE

== See also ==
- Communes of the Aude department
