= Pépieux =

Commune in Occitanie, France

- Commune
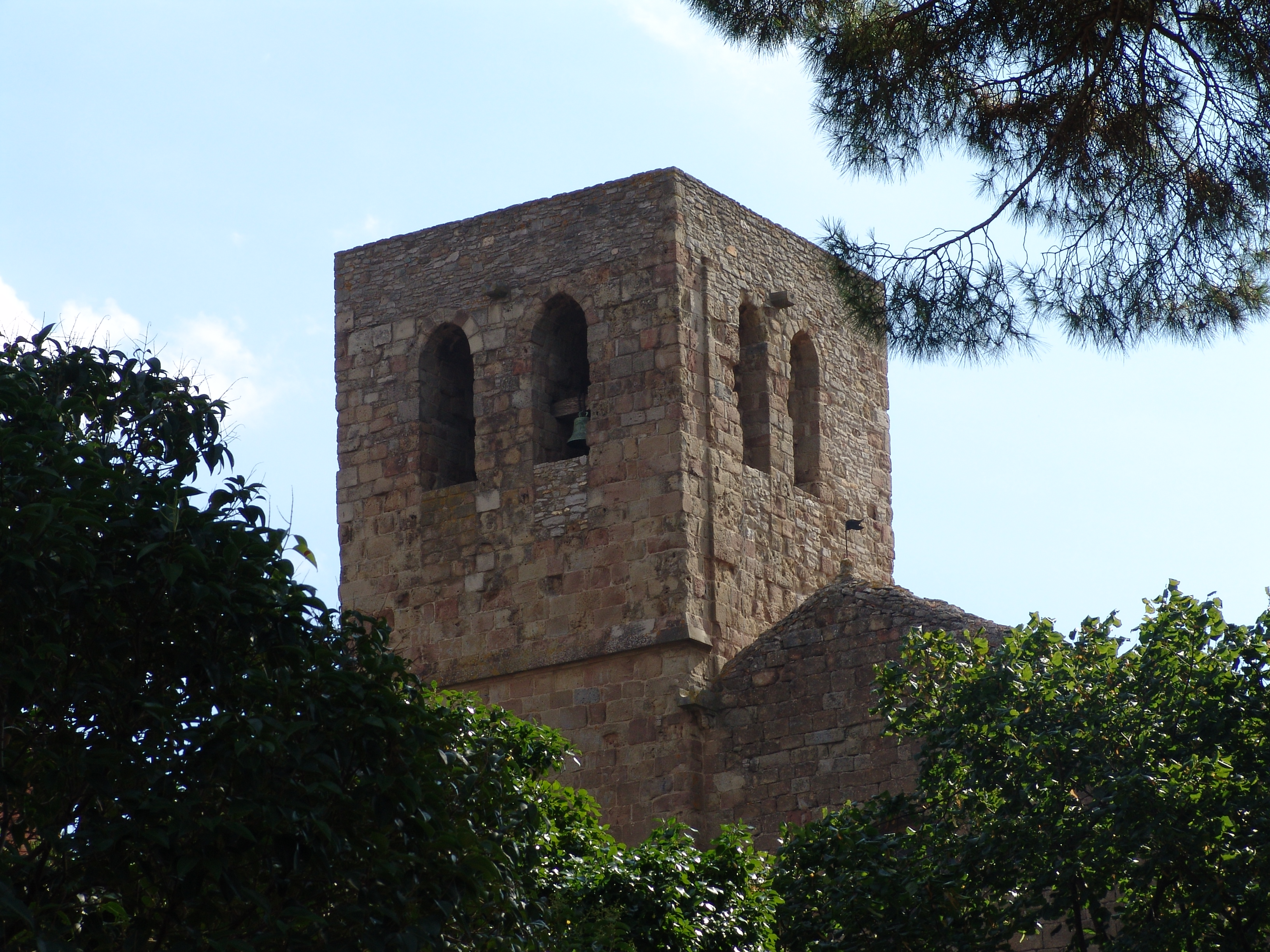
- The church in Pépieux

- Coat of arms
- Location of Pépieux
- Location within France Location within Occitanie
- Coordinates: 43°17′51″N 2°40′48″E
- Country: France
- Region: Occitania
- Department: Aude
- Arrondissement: Carcassonne
- Canton: Le Haut-Minervois
- Intercommunality: Carcassonne Agglo

Government
  - Mayor (2020–2026): Pascal Vallière
- Area^{1}: 9.85 km^{2} (3.80 sq mi)
- Elevation: 85 m (279 ft)
- Highest elevation: 102 m (335 ft)
- Lowest elevation: 48 m (157 ft)
- Population (2023): 1,118
  - Density: 114/km^{2} (294/sq mi)
- Time zone: UTC+01:00 (CET)
  - Summer (DST): UTC+02:00 (CEST)
- INSEE/Postal code: 11280 /11700
- ^{1} French Land Register data, which excludes lakes, ponds, glaciers > 1 km^{2} (0.386 sq mi or 247 acres) and river estuaries.

Pépieux (French pronunciation: [pepjø]; Occitan: Pepius) is a commune in the Aude department in southern France.

== Population ==
Historical population
Year	Pop.	±% p.a.
1968	807	—
1975	913	+1.78%
1982	992	+1.19%
1990	1,041	+0.60%
1999	949	−1.02%
2007	975	+0.34%
2012	1,012	+0.75%
2017	1,068	+1.08%
2023	1,118	+0.77%
Source: INSEE

== See also ==
- Communes of the Aude department
