= Puichéric =

Commune in Occitanie, France

- Commune
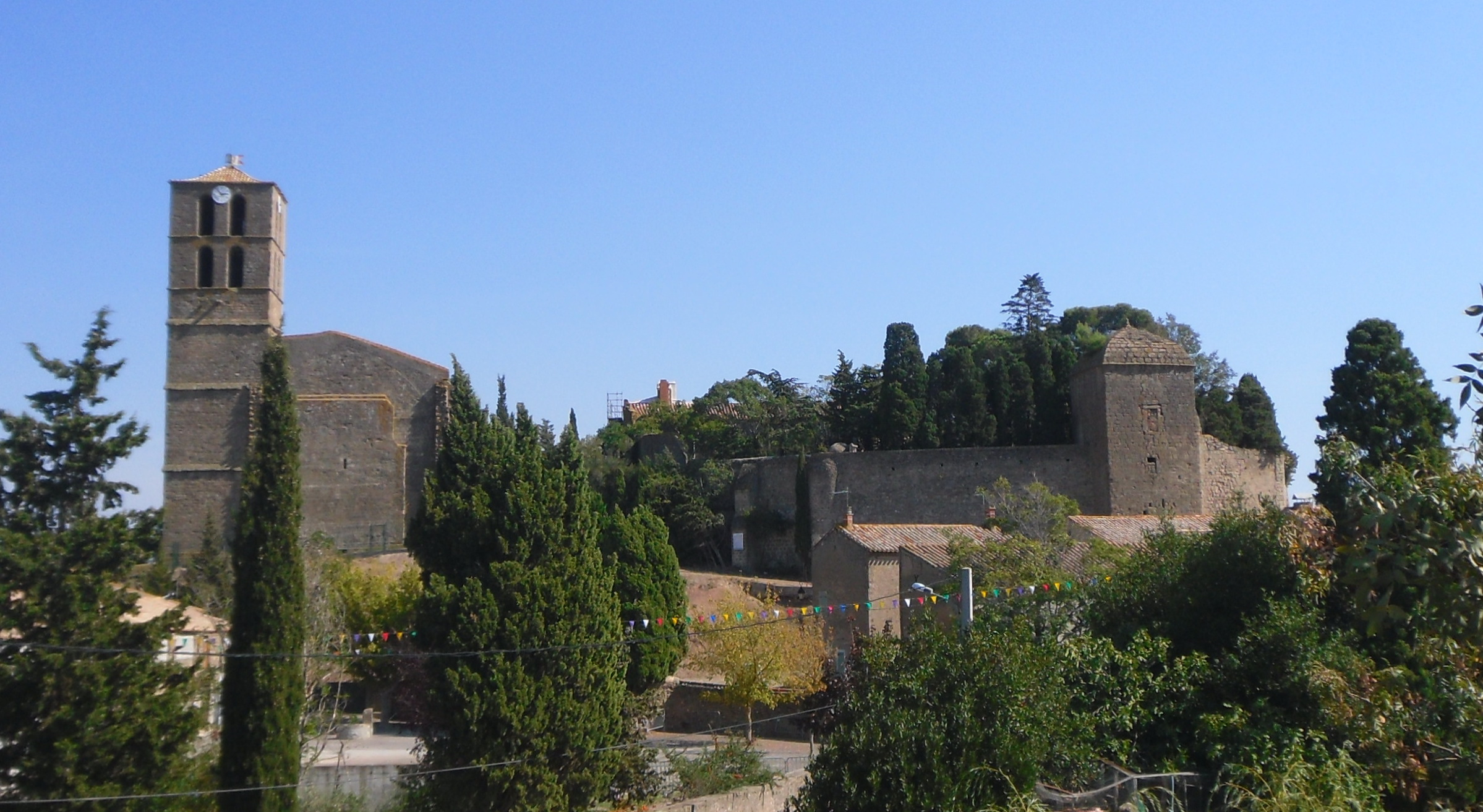
- The church and chateau in Puichéric

- Coat of arms
- Location of Puichéric
- Location within France Location within Occitanie
- Coordinates: 43°13′29″N 2°37′30″E
- Country: France
- Region: Occitania
- Department: Aude
- Arrondissement: Carcassonne
- Canton: Le Haut-Minervois
- Intercommunality: Carcassonne Agglo

Government
  - Mayor (2020–2026): Christine Peany
- Area^{1}: 13.73 km^{2} (5.30 sq mi)
- Highest elevation: 106 m (348 ft)
- Lowest elevation: 48 m (157 ft)
- Population (2023): 1,198
  - Density: 87.25/km^{2} (226.0/sq mi)
- Time zone: UTC+01:00 (CET)
  - Summer (DST): UTC+02:00 (CEST)
- INSEE/Postal code: 11301 /11700
- ^{1} French Land Register data, which excludes lakes, ponds, glaciers > 1 km^{2} (0.386 sq mi or 247 acres) and river estuaries.

Puichéric (French pronunciation: [pɥiʃeʁik]; Occitan: Puègeric) is a commune in the Aude department in southern France.

The commune is situated between the Aude and the Canal du Midi, and its inhabitants are called Puichéricois.

The name of the commune first appeared in 1063 as Puigeirig.

== Population ==
Historical population
Year	Pop.	±% p.a.
1968	1,023	—
1975	1,010	−0.18%
1982	1,056	+0.64%
1990	1,019	−0.44%
1999	1,025	+0.07%
2007	1,014	−0.13%
2012	1,100	+1.64%
2017	1,191	+1.60%
2023	1,198	+0.10%
Source: INSEE

== See also ==
- Communes of the Aude department
