= Lagrasse =

Commune in Occitanie, France

Lagrasse La Grassa (Occitan)
- Commune
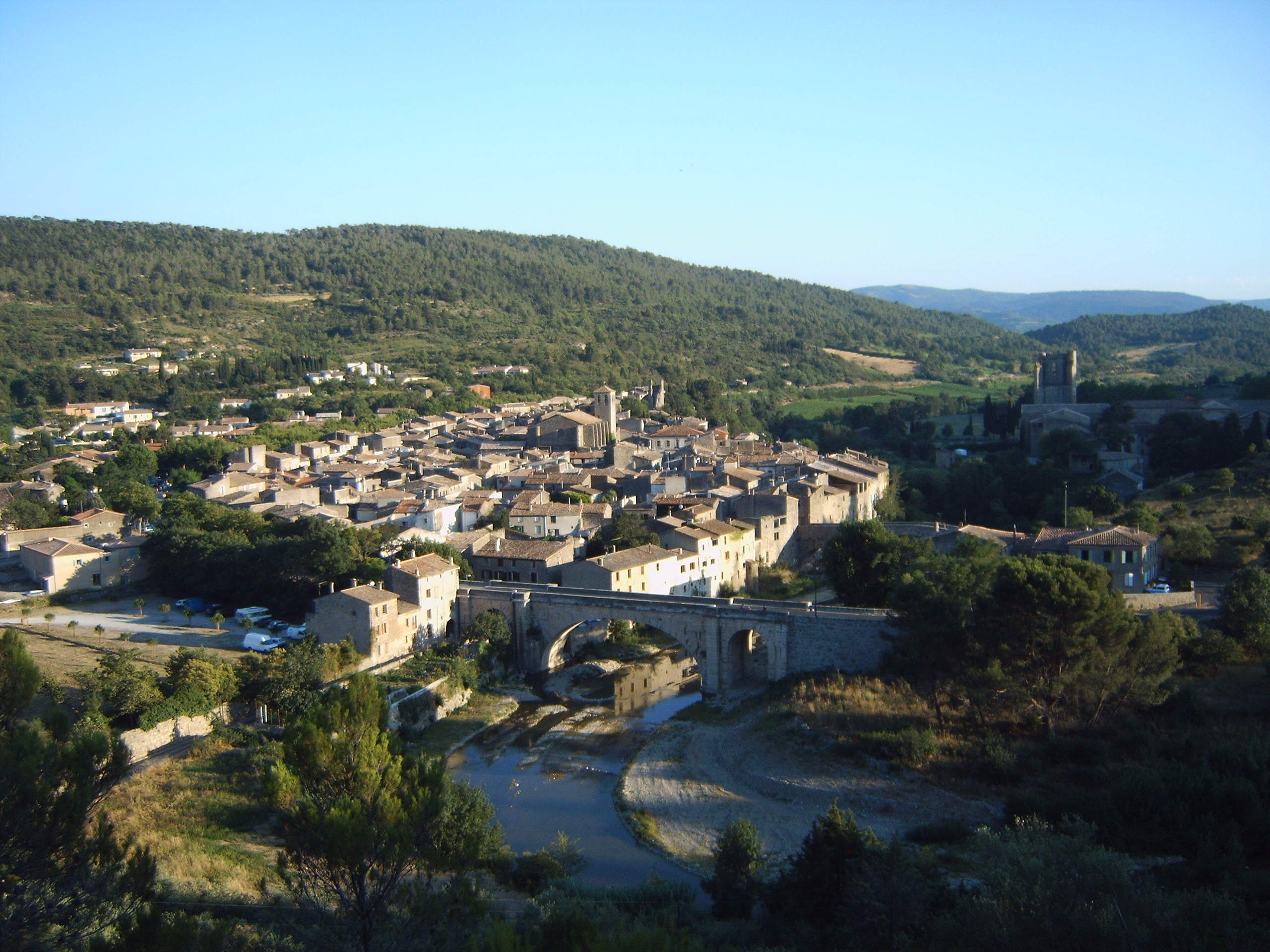
- View of Lagrasse

- Coat of arms
- Location of Lagrasse
- Location within France Location within Occitanie
- Coordinates: 43°05′28″N 2°37′10″E
- Country: France
- Region: Occitania
- Department: Aude
- Arrondissement: Narbonne
- Canton: Les Corbières
- Intercommunality: Région Lézignanaise, Corbières et Minervois

Government
  - Mayor (2020–2026): René Ortega
- Area^{1}: 32.2 km^{2} (12.4 sq mi)
- Elevation: 108 m (354 ft)
- Highest elevation: 586 m (1,923 ft)
- Lowest elevation: 82 m (269 ft)
- Population (2023): 554
  - Density: 17.2/km^{2} (44.6/sq mi)
- Time zone: UTC+01:00 (CET)
  - Summer (DST): UTC+02:00 (CEST)
- INSEE/Postal code: 11185 /11220
- ^{1} French Land Register data, which excludes lakes, ponds, glaciers > 1 km^{2} (0.386 sq mi or 247 acres) and river estuaries.

Lagrasse (French pronunciation: [laɡʁas]; Occitan: La Grassa) is a commune in the Aude department in the Occitanie region of Southern France. Lagrasse is part of the Les Plus Beaux Villages de France ("The most beautiful villages of France") association.

== Geography ==
Lagrasse is about 30 km (19 mi) southwest of Carcassonne. It lies in the valley of the River Orbieu, at the foot of the Pyrenees.

== History ==
Lagrasse dates from the time the abbey was built. Permission for the construction was given by Charlemagne in 783.

== Population ==
Historical population
| Year | Pop. | ±% p.a. |
|---|---|---|
| 1968 | 665 | — |
| 1975 | 623 | −0.93% |
| 1982 | 696 | +1.60% |
| 1990 | 704 | +0.14% |
| 1999 | 615 | −1.49% |
| 2007 | 601 | −0.29% |
| 2012 | 566 | −1.19% |
| 2017 | 545 | −0.75% |
| 2023 | 554 | +0.27% |
Source: INSEE

== Sights ==
The two highlights of the village are the eponymous Abbey and the bridges, although the narrow medieval streets of the village itself are also very attractive, and remains of the town walls can still be seen.

== Economy ==
The region is renowned for the wine produced in the surrounding hills - this is the Corbières wine region, the largest wine-producing region in France.

The village is now home to numerous pottery workers and artists, and host numerous cultural and intellectual festivals such as "Le Banquet du Livre" and the "En Blanc et Noir: Festival International de Piano Robert Turnbull."

== See also ==
- Communes of the Aude department
