= Rieux-Minervois =

Commune in Occitanie, France

- Commune
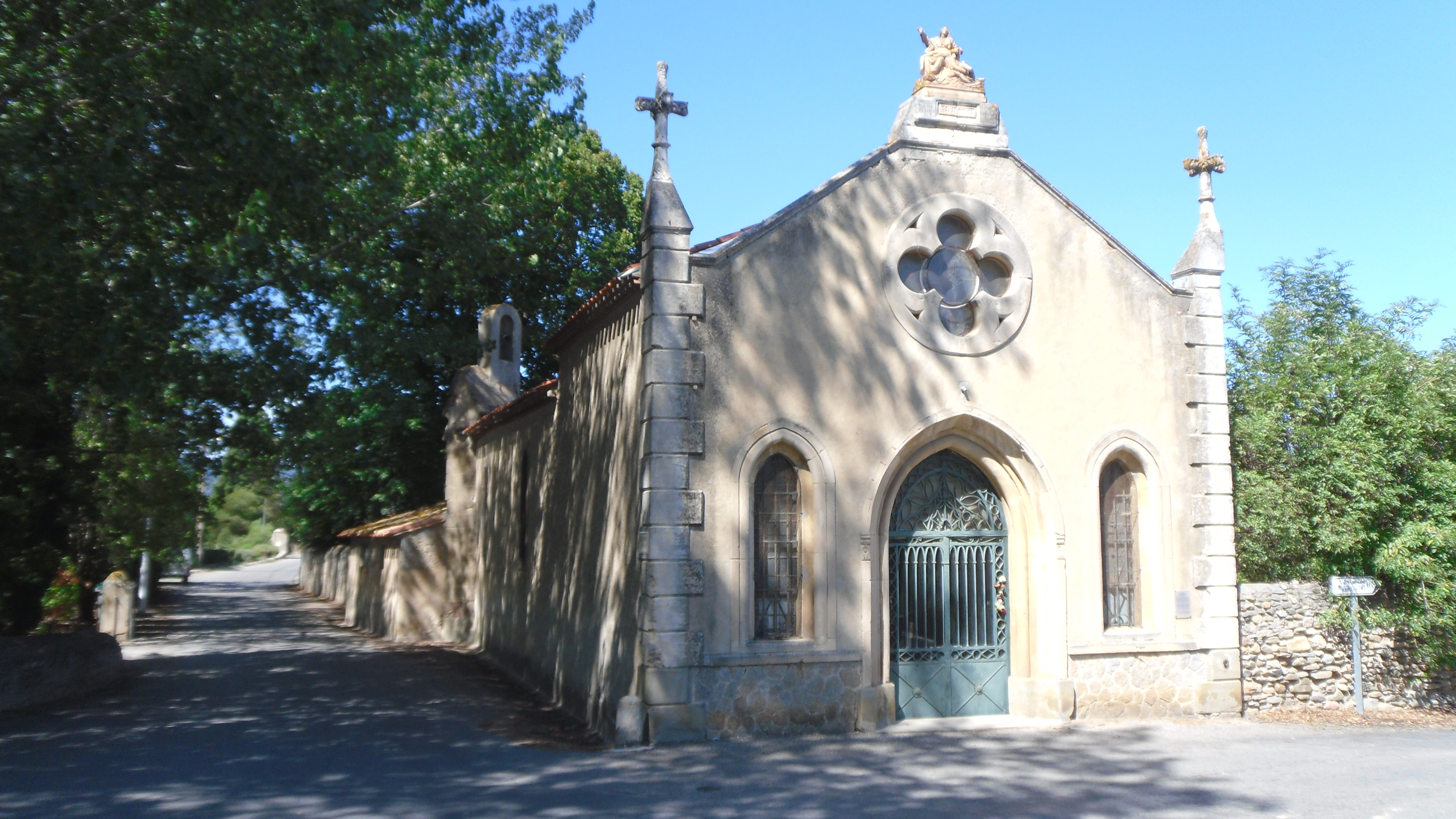
- The chapel in Rieux-Minervois

- Coat of arms
- Location of Rieux-Minervois
- Location within France Location within Occitanie
- Coordinates: 43°16′58″N 2°35′18″E
- Country: France
- Region: Occitania
- Department: Aude
- Arrondissement: Carcassonne
- Canton: Le Haut-Minervois
- Intercommunality: Carcassonne Agglo

Government
  - Mayor (2020–2026): Bernard Yagues
- Area^{1}: 21.19 km^{2} (8.18 sq mi)
- Elevation: 115 m (377 ft)
- Highest elevation: 180 m (590 ft)
- Lowest elevation: 55 m (180 ft)
- Population (2023): 1,957
  - Density: 92.35/km^{2} (239.2/sq mi)
- Time zone: UTC+01:00 (CET)
  - Summer (DST): UTC+02:00 (CEST)
- INSEE/Postal code: 11315 /11160
- ^{1} French Land Register data, which excludes lakes, ponds, glaciers > 1 km^{2} (0.386 sq mi or 247 acres) and river estuaries.

Rieux-Minervois (Languedocien: Rius de Menerbés) is a commune in the Aude department in southern France.

== Population ==
Historical population
Year	Pop.	±% p.a.
1968	2,048	—
1975	1,879	−1.22%
1982	1,892	+0.10%
1990	1,868	−0.16%
1999	2,075	+1.17%
2007	2,042	−0.20%
2012	2,021	−0.21%
2017	1,987	−0.34%
2023	1,957	−0.25%
Source: INSEE

== See also ==
- Communes of the Aude department
- Rio (disambiguation)
- Ríos (disambiguation)
