= Laure-Minervois =

Commune in Occitanie, France

- Commune
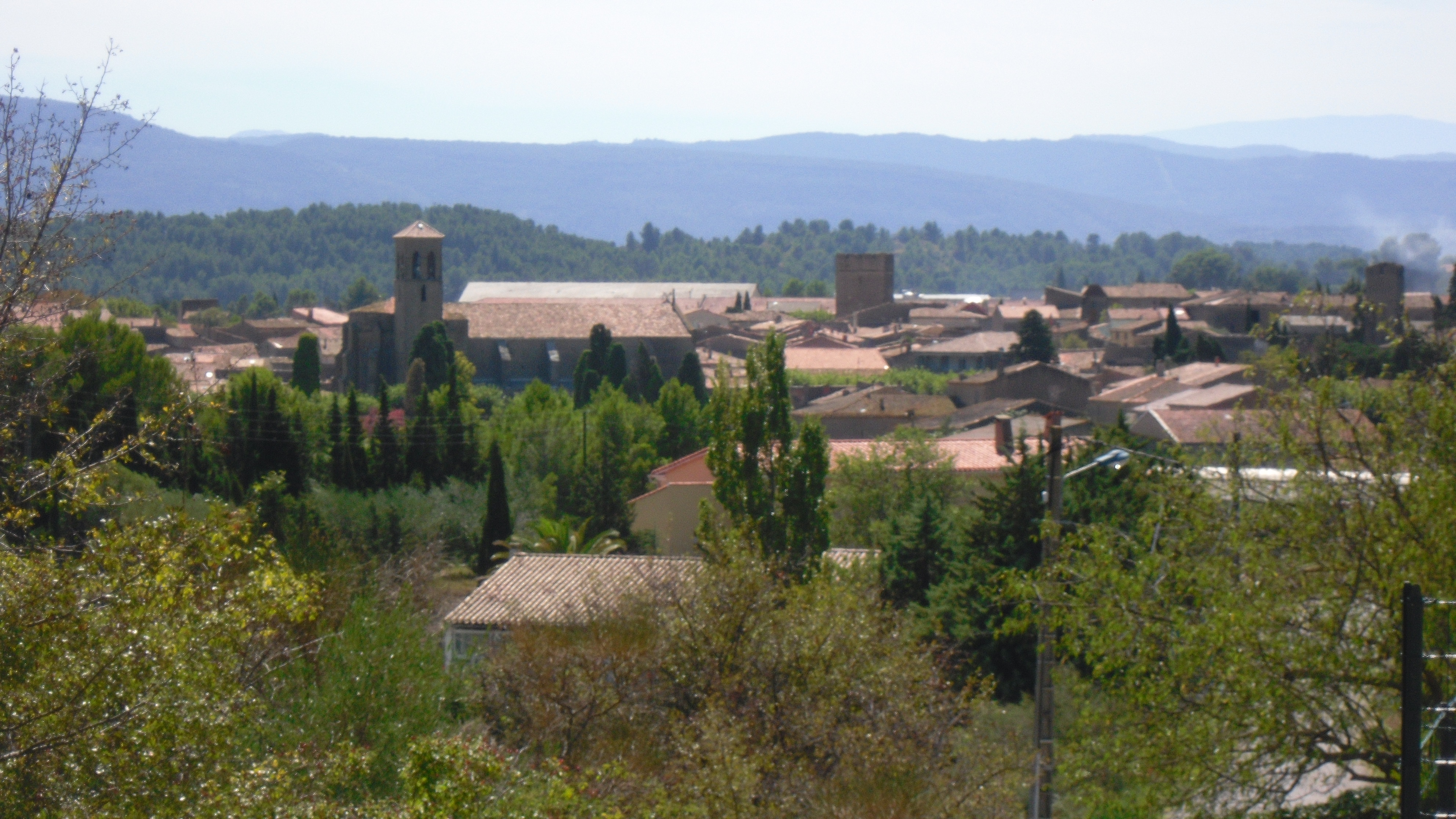
- A general view of Laure-Minervois

- Coat of arms
- Location of Laure-Minervois
- Location within France Location within Occitanie
- Coordinates: 43°16′20″N 2°31′16″E
- Country: France
- Region: Occitania
- Department: Aude
- Arrondissement: Carcassonne
- Canton: Le Haut-Minervois
- Intercommunality: Carcassonne Agglo

Government
  - Mayor (2020–2026): Emile Raggini
- Area^{1}: 39.23 km^{2} (15.15 sq mi)
- Elevation: 90 m (300 ft)
- Highest elevation: 243 m (797 ft)
- Lowest elevation: 60 m (200 ft)
- Population (2023): 1,061
  - Density: 27.05/km^{2} (70.05/sq mi)
- Time zone: UTC+01:00 (CET)
  - Summer (DST): UTC+02:00 (CEST)
- INSEE/Postal code: 11198 /11800
- ^{1} French Land Register data, which excludes lakes, ponds, glaciers > 1 km^{2} (0.386 sq mi or 247 acres) and river estuaries.

Laure-Minervois is a commune in the Aude department in southern France.

== Population ==
Historical population
Year	Pop.	±% p.a.
1968	1,156	—
1975	1,062	−1.20%
1982	1,126	+0.84%
1990	1,159	+0.36%
1999	1,096	−0.62%
2007	1,050	−0.53%
2012	1,072	+0.42%
2017	1,055	−0.32%
2023	1,061	+0.09%
Source: INSEE

== See also ==
- Communes of the Aude department
