= Jean Dax, Lord of Axat =

Jean Dax, (died 1495) lord of Leuc, La Serpent and Axat, was lieutenant of the Seneschal of Carcassonne in 1483, lieutenant of the Seneschal of Roussillon and Cerdanya from 1489 to 1491, vicar of Carcassonne in 1491, and then Chamberlain of Charles VIII and Provost Marshal of Sicily.

== Family ==
The Coat of Arms of the Dax Family

A member of the Dax Family, Jean was the eldest son of Arnaud Dax, a wealthy merchant and lord of Leuc, La Serpent, and Axat, ennobled by letters patent of Charles VII in 1457.

By 1476, Jean had inherited his father's titles and, in that year married Constance de Narbonne, daughter of Nicholas de Narbonne-Taleiran, lord of Nébias and the King's lieutenant of Languedoc.

Jean had at least five children with Constance:

- Francis, lord of Leuc and La Serpent
- Peter, lord of Azat
- Jordette
- Claire
- Isabel

== Career ==
Jean Dax served as secretary to the bishop of Carcassonne from 1480 to 1482, treasurer and lieutenant of the Seneschal of Carcassonne in 1483 and lieutenant of the Seneschal of Roussillon and Cerdanya from 1489 to 1491.

He was then appointed as the Chamberlain to King Charles VIII and Grand Provost of the marshals of France in Sicily. In September 1494, he was one of the lords of Languedoc who accompanied Charles VIII in his expedition to Italy and who were with him in Asti. He then followed Charles VIII to Naples, where he was killed at the siege of Gaeta in May 1495.
