= Peyrefitte =

Peyrefitte is an Occitan surname. Notable people with this name include:

- Roger Peyrefitte (1907–2000), French diplomat and novelist
- Alain Peyrefitte (1925–1999), French politician and confidante of Charles de Gaulle
- Michael Peyrefitte, Belizean attorney and politician

Peyrefitte can also refer to:

- Peyrefitte-du-Razès, a French commune in the Aude département
- Peyrefitte-sur-l'Hers, a French commune in the Aude département
