= Tréziers =

Commune in Occitanie, France

- Commune
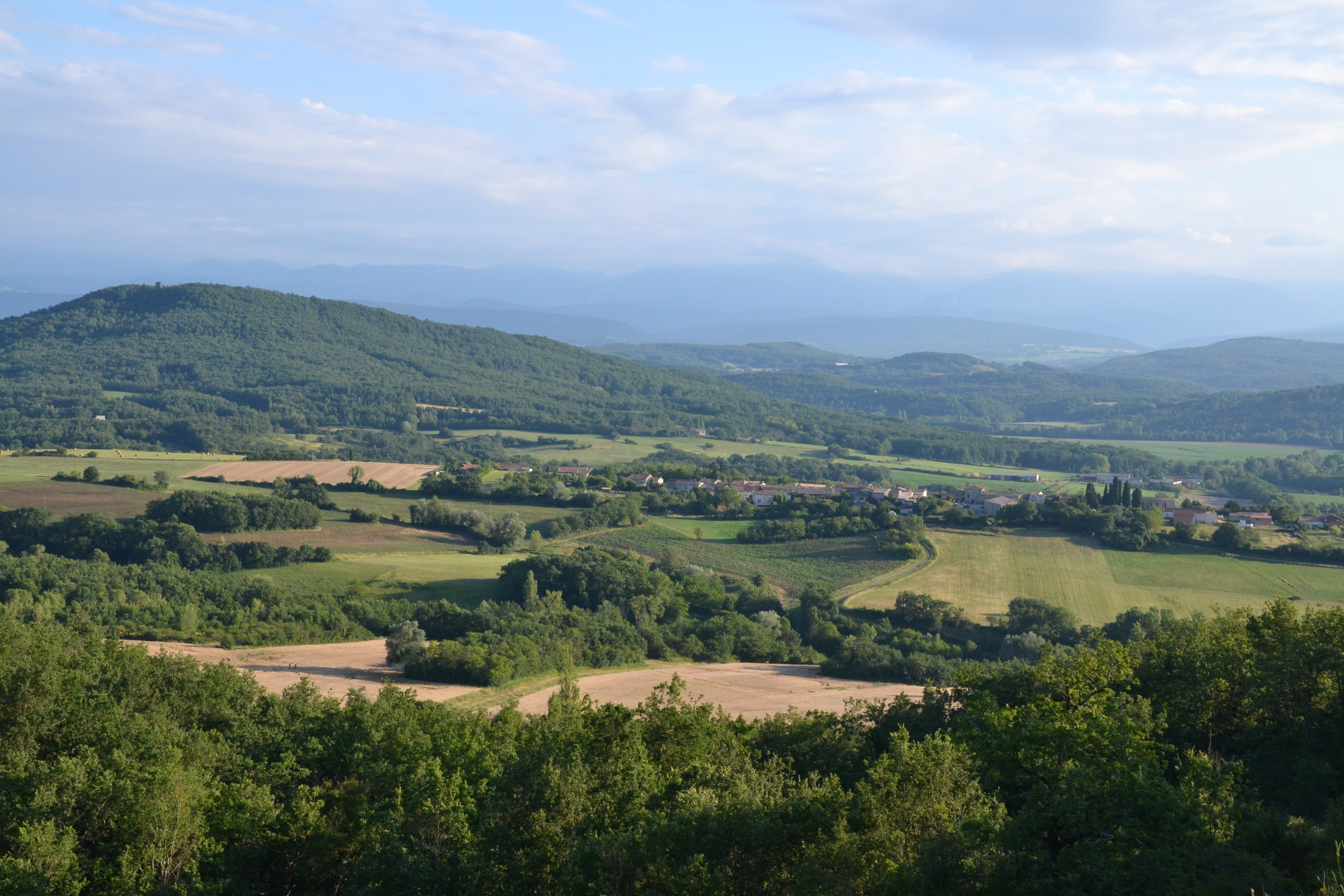
- A general view of Tréziers

- Coat of arms
- Location of Tréziers
- Location within France Location within Occitanie
- Coordinates: 43°03′29″N 1°57′18″E
- Country: France
- Region: Occitania
- Department: Aude
- Arrondissement: Limoux
- Canton: La Haute-Vallée de l'Aude

Government
  - Mayor (2020–2026): Jean-Christophe Gauvrit
- Area^{1}: 6.41 km^{2} (2.47 sq mi)
- Elevation: 370 m (1,210 ft)
- Highest elevation: 530 m (1,740 ft)
- Lowest elevation: 317 m (1,040 ft)
- Population (2023): 98
  - Density: 15/km^{2} (40/sq mi)
- Time zone: UTC+01:00 (CET)
  - Summer (DST): UTC+02:00 (CEST)
- INSEE/Postal code: 11400 /11230
- ^{1} French Land Register data, which excludes lakes, ponds, glaciers > 1 km^{2} (0.386 sq mi or 247 acres) and river estuaries.

Tréziers (French pronunciation: [tʁezje]; Occitan: Tresièrs) is a commune in the Aude department in southern France.

== Population ==
Historical population
Year	Pop.	±% p.a.
1968	54	—
1975	51	−0.81%
1982	67	+3.98%
1990	68	+0.19%
1999	84	+2.38%
2007	113	+3.78%
2012	105	−1.46%
2017	100	−0.97%
2023	98	−0.34%
Source: INSEE

== See also ==
- Communes of the Aude department
