= Luc-sur-Aude =

Commune in Occitanie, France

- Commune
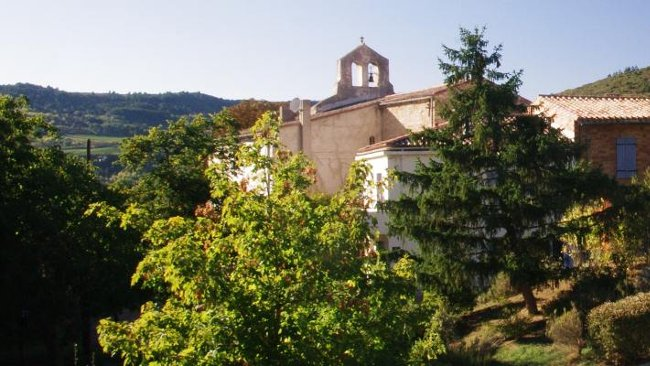
- The church in Luc-sur-Aude

- Coat of arms
- Location of Luc-sur-Aude
- Location within France Location within Occitanie
- Coordinates: 42°57′36″N 2°16′16″E
- Country: France
- Region: Occitania
- Department: Aude
- Arrondissement: Limoux
- Canton: La Haute-Vallée de l'Aude

Government
  - Mayor (2020–2026): Jean-Claude Pons
- Area^{1}: 7.67 km^{2} (2.96 sq mi)
- Elevation: 235 m (771 ft)
- Highest elevation: 561 m (1,841 ft)
- Lowest elevation: 217 m (712 ft)
- Population (2023): 257
  - Density: 33.5/km^{2} (86.8/sq mi)
- Time zone: UTC+01:00 (CET)
  - Summer (DST): UTC+02:00 (CEST)
- INSEE/Postal code: 11209 /11190
- ^{1} French Land Register data, which excludes lakes, ponds, glaciers > 1 km^{2} (0.386 sq mi or 247 acres) and river estuaries.

Luc-sur-Aude (French pronunciation: [lyk syʁ od], literally Luc on Aude; Occitan: Luc d'Aude) is a commune in the Aude department in southern France.

== Population ==
Historical population
| Year | Pop. | ±% p.a. |
|---|---|---|
| 1968 | 109 | — |
| 1975 | 113 | +0.52% |
| 1982 | 130 | +2.02% |
| 1990 | 199 | +5.47% |
| 1999 | 173 | −1.54% |
| 2007 | 190 | +1.18% |
| 2012 | 211 | +2.12% |
| 2017 | 246 | +3.12% |
| 2023 | 257 | +0.73% |
Source: INSEE

== See also ==
- Communes of the Aude department
