= Villefort, Aude =

Commune in Occitanie, France

Villefort
- Commune
- Coat of arms
- Location of Villefort
- Location within France Location within Occitanie
- Coordinates: 42°57′17″N 2°02′00″E
- Country: France
- Region: Occitania
- Department: Aude
- Arrondissement: Limoux
- Canton: La Haute-Vallée de l'Aude

Government
  - Mayor (2020–2026): Marc Rivals
- Area^{1}: 12.67 km^{2} (4.89 sq mi)
- Elevation: 420 m (1,380 ft)
- Highest elevation: 760 m (2,490 ft)
- Lowest elevation: 394 m (1,293 ft)
- Population (2023): 88
  - Density: 6.9/km^{2} (18/sq mi)
- Time zone: UTC+01:00 (CET)
  - Summer (DST): UTC+02:00 (CEST)
- INSEE/Postal code: 11424 /11230
- ^{1} French Land Register data, which excludes lakes, ponds, glaciers > 1 km^{2} (0.386 sq mi or 247 acres) and river estuaries.

Villefort (French pronunciation: [vilfɔʁ]; Occitan: Vilafòrt) is a commune in the Aude department in southern France.

== Population ==
Historical population
Year	Pop.	±% p.a.
1968	90	—
1975	70	−3.53%
1982	87	+3.15%
1990	80	−1.04%
1999	87	+0.94%
2007	105	+2.38%
2012	98	−1.37%
2017	89	−1.91%
2023	88	−0.19%
Source: INSEE

== See also ==
- Communes of the Aude department
