= Antugnac =

Commune in Occitanie, France

- Commune
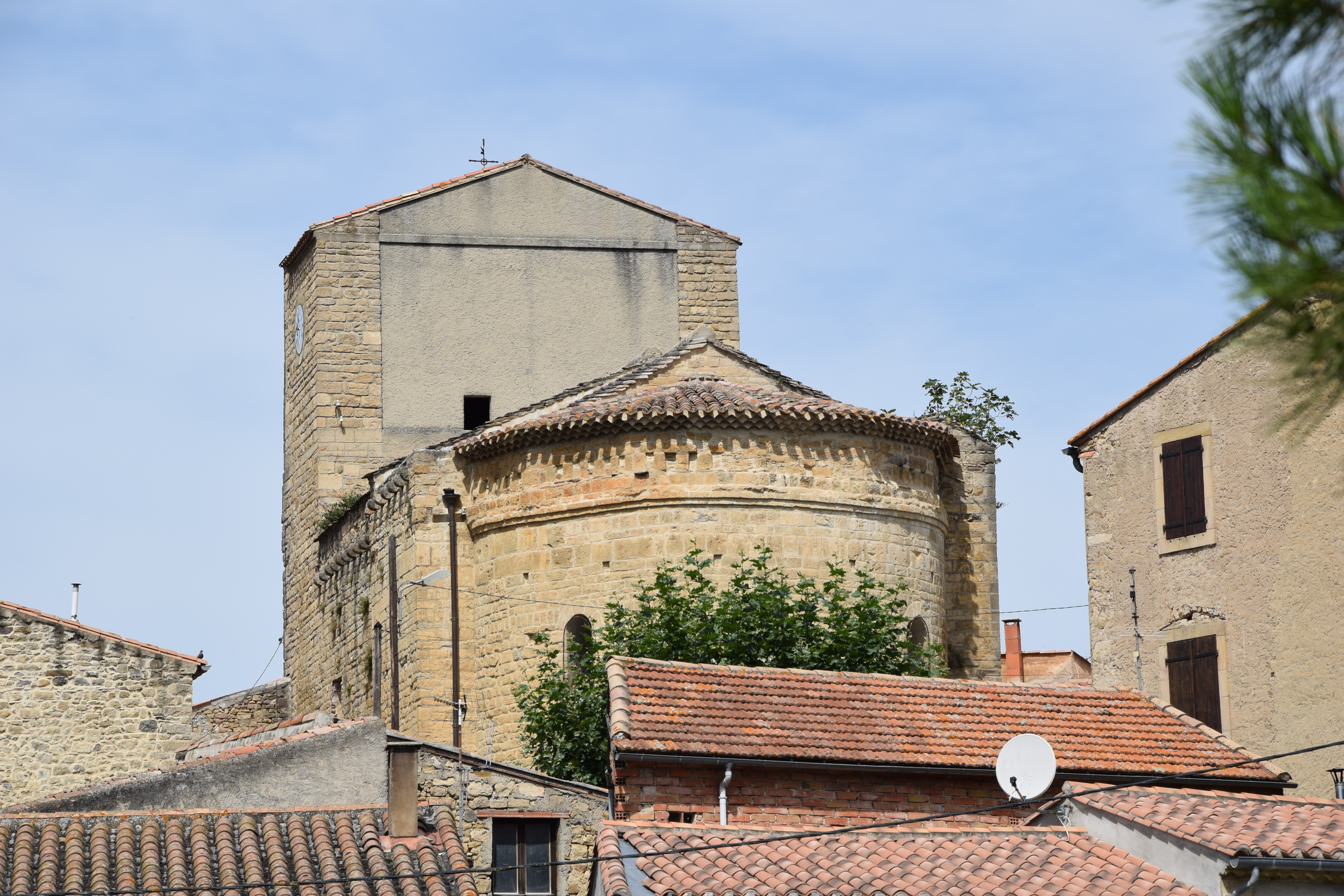
- The church in Antugnac

- Coat of arms
- Location of Antugnac
- Location within France Location within Occitanie
- Coordinates: 42°57′21″N 2°13′32″E
- Country: France
- Region: Occitania
- Department: Aude
- Arrondissement: Limoux
- Canton: La Haute-Vallée de l'Aude
- Intercommunality: Limouxin

Government
  - Mayor (2020–2026): Philippe Comte
- Area^{1}: 9.49 km^{2} (3.66 sq mi)
- Elevation: 265 m (869 ft)
- Highest elevation: 587 m (1,926 ft)
- Lowest elevation: 260 m (850 ft)
- Population (2023): 291
  - Density: 30.7/km^{2} (79.4/sq mi)
- Time zone: UTC+01:00 (CET)
  - Summer (DST): UTC+02:00 (CEST)
- INSEE/Postal code: 11010 /11190
- ^{1} French Land Register data, which excludes lakes, ponds, glaciers > 1 km^{2} (0.386 sq mi or 247 acres) and river estuaries.

Antugnac (French pronunciation: [ɑ̃tyɲak]; Occitan: Antunhac) is a commune in the Aude department in southern France.

== Population ==
Historical population
Year	Pop.	±% p.a.
1968	238	—
1975	223	−0.93%
1982	219	−0.26%
1990	256	+1.97%
1999	266	+0.43%
2007	320	+2.34%
2012	324	+0.25%
2017	268	−3.72%
2023	291	+1.38%
Source: INSEE

== See also ==
- Communes of the Aude department
