= Cailla =

Commune in Occitanie, France

- Commune
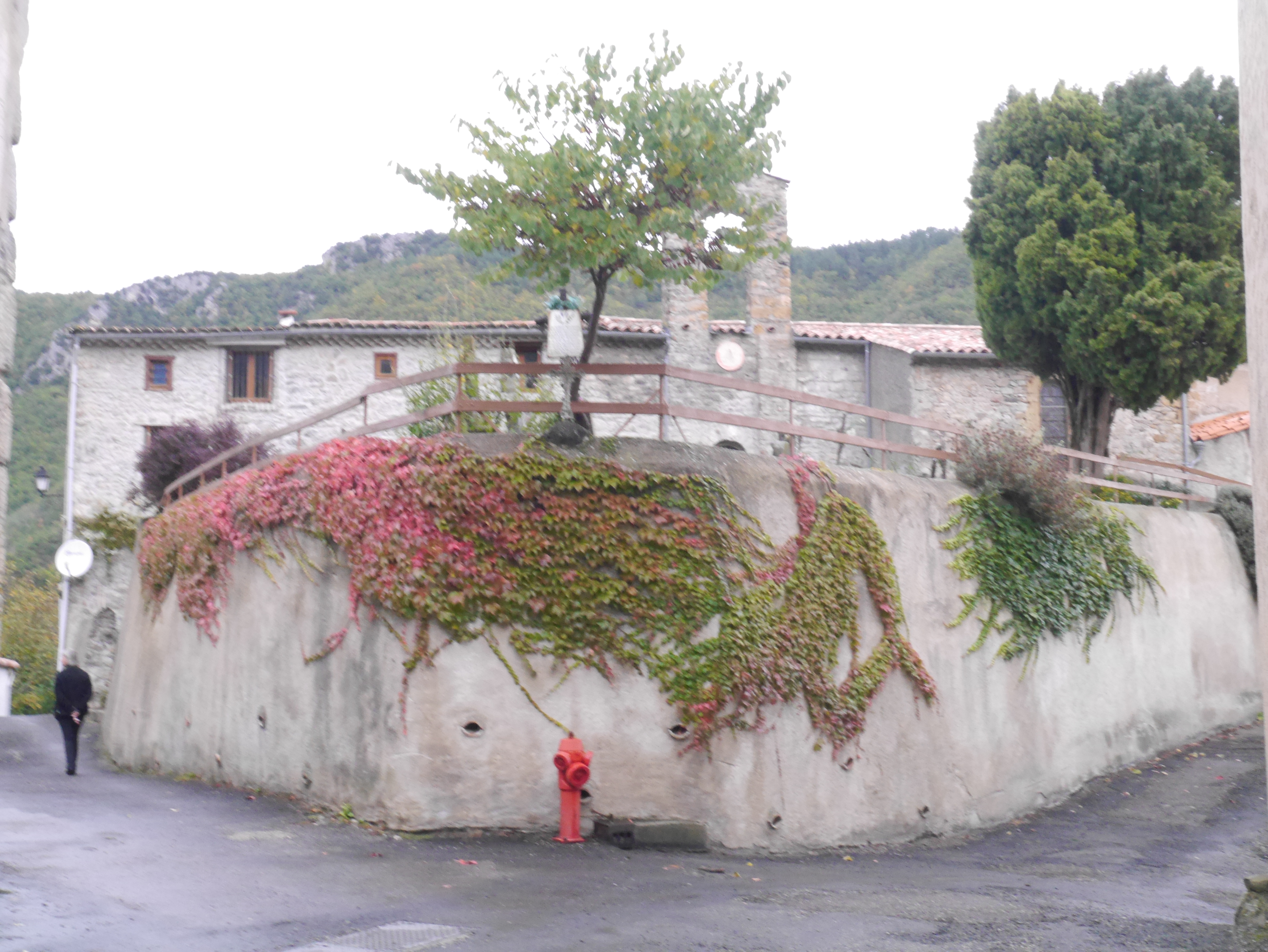
- The church in Cailla

- Coat of arms
- Location of Cailla
- Location within France Location within Occitanie
- Coordinates: 42°48′56″N 2°11′51″E
- Country: France
- Region: Occitania
- Department: Aude
- Arrondissement: Limoux
- Canton: La Haute-Vallée de l'Aude
- Intercommunality: Pyrénées Audoises

Government
  - Mayor (2020–2026): Alfred Vismara
- Area^{1}: 7.64 km^{2} (2.95 sq mi)
- Elevation: 400 m (1,300 ft)
- Highest elevation: 1,240 m (4,070 ft)
- Lowest elevation: 387 m (1,270 ft)
- Population (2023): 49
  - Density: 6.4/km^{2} (17/sq mi)
- Time zone: UTC+01:00 (CET)
  - Summer (DST): UTC+02:00 (CEST)
- INSEE/Postal code: 11060 /11140
- ^{1} French Land Register data, which excludes lakes, ponds, glaciers > 1 km^{2} (0.386 sq mi or 247 acres) and river estuaries.

Cailla (French pronunciation: [kaja]; Occitan: Calhan) is a commune in the Aude department in southern France.

== Population ==
Historical population
Year	Pop.	±% p.a.
1968	17	—
1975	28	+7.39%
1982	41	+5.60%
1990	48	+1.99%
1999	51	+0.68%
2007	50	−0.25%
2012	51	+0.40%
2017	48	−1.21%
2023	49	+0.34%
Source: INSEE

== See also ==
- Communes of the Aude department
