= Saint-Benoît, Aude =

Commune in Occitanie, France

Saint-Benoît
- Commune
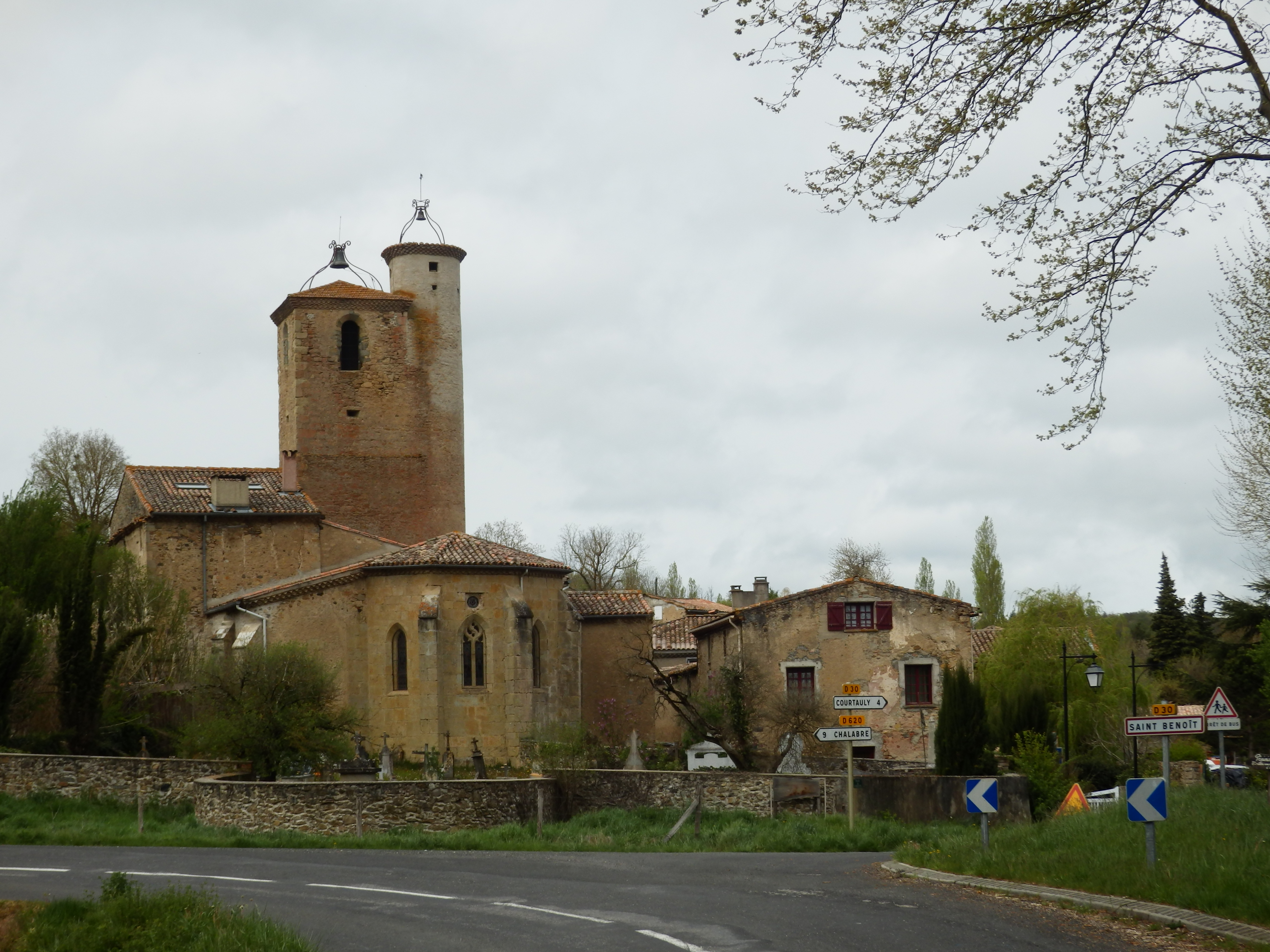
- The church and surroundings in Saint-Benoît

- Coat of arms
- Location of Saint-Benoît
- Location within France Location within Occitanie
- Coordinates: 43°01′07″N 2°03′46″E
- Country: France
- Region: Occitania
- Department: Aude
- Arrondissement: Limoux
- Canton: La Haute-Vallée de l'Aude
- Intercommunality: Pyrénées Audoises

Government
  - Mayor (2020–2026): Serge Bacave
- Area^{1}: 21.31 km^{2} (8.23 sq mi)
- Elevation: 450 m (1,480 ft)
- Highest elevation: 766 m (2,513 ft)
- Lowest elevation: 406 m (1,332 ft)
- Population (2023): 109
  - Density: 5.11/km^{2} (13.2/sq mi)
- Time zone: UTC+01:00 (CET)
  - Summer (DST): UTC+02:00 (CEST)
- INSEE/Postal code: 11333 /11230
- ^{1} French Land Register data, which excludes lakes, ponds, glaciers > 1 km^{2} (0.386 sq mi or 247 acres) and river estuaries.

Saint-Benoît (French pronunciation: [sɛ̃ bənwa]; Languedocien: Sant Benaset) is a commune in the Aude department in southern France.

== Population ==
Historical population
| Year | Pop. | ±% p.a. |
|---|---|---|
| 1968 | 68 | — |
| 1975 | 56 | −2.74% |
| 1982 | 89 | +6.84% |
| 1990 | 90 | +0.14% |
| 1999 | 106 | +1.83% |
| 2007 | 112 | +0.69% |
| 2012 | 107 | −0.91% |
| 2017 | 105 | −0.38% |
| 2023 | 109 | +0.63% |
Source: INSEE

== See also ==
- Communes of the Aude department
