= Quirbajou =

Commune in Occitanie, France

- Commune
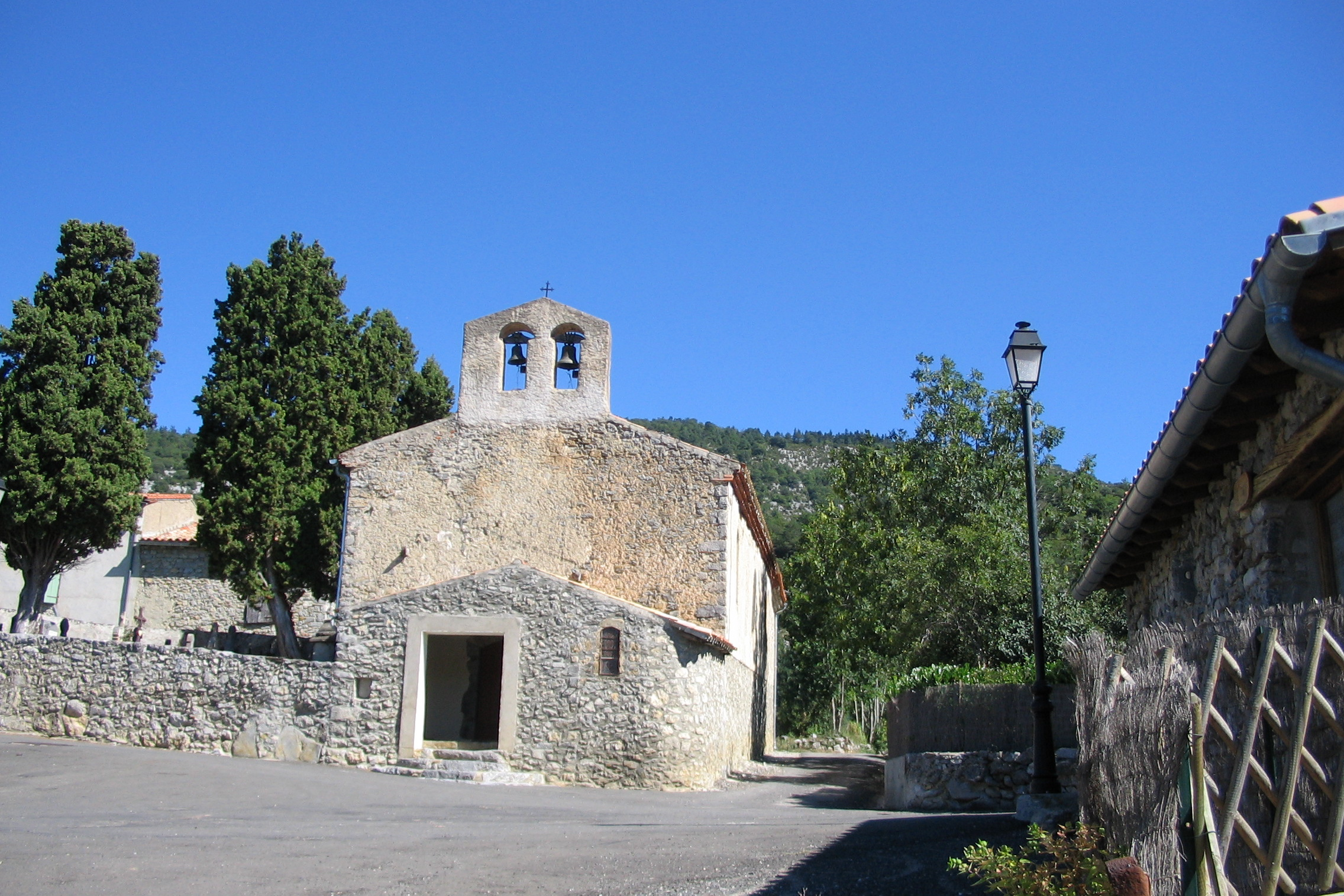
- The church in Quirbajou

- Coat of arms
- Location of Quirbajou
- Location within France Location within Occitanie
- Coordinates: 42°49′50″N 2°10′46″E
- Country: France
- Region: Occitania
- Department: Aude
- Arrondissement: Limoux
- Canton: La Haute-Vallée de l'Aude
- Intercommunality: Pyrénées Audoises

Government
  - Mayor (2020–2026): Jacques de la Piquerie
- Area^{1}: 13.95 km^{2} (5.39 sq mi)
- Elevation: 820 m (2,690 ft)
- Highest elevation: 1,280 m (4,200 ft)
- Lowest elevation: 360 m (1,180 ft)
- Population (2023): 49
  - Density: 3.5/km^{2} (9.1/sq mi)
- Time zone: UTC+01:00 (CET)
  - Summer (DST): UTC+02:00 (CEST)
- INSEE/Postal code: 11306 /11500
- ^{1} French Land Register data, which excludes lakes, ponds, glaciers > 1 km^{2} (0.386 sq mi or 247 acres) and river estuaries.

Quirbajou (French pronunciation: [kiʁbaʒu]; Occitan: Quirbajon) is a commune in the Aude department in southern France.

== Population ==
Historical population
Year	Pop.	±% p.a.
1968	25	—
1975	18	−4.58%
1982	20	+1.52%
1990	29	+4.75%
1999	38	+3.05%
2007	36	−0.67%
2012	44	+4.10%
2017	51	+3.00%
2023	49	−0.66%
Source: INSEE

== History ==
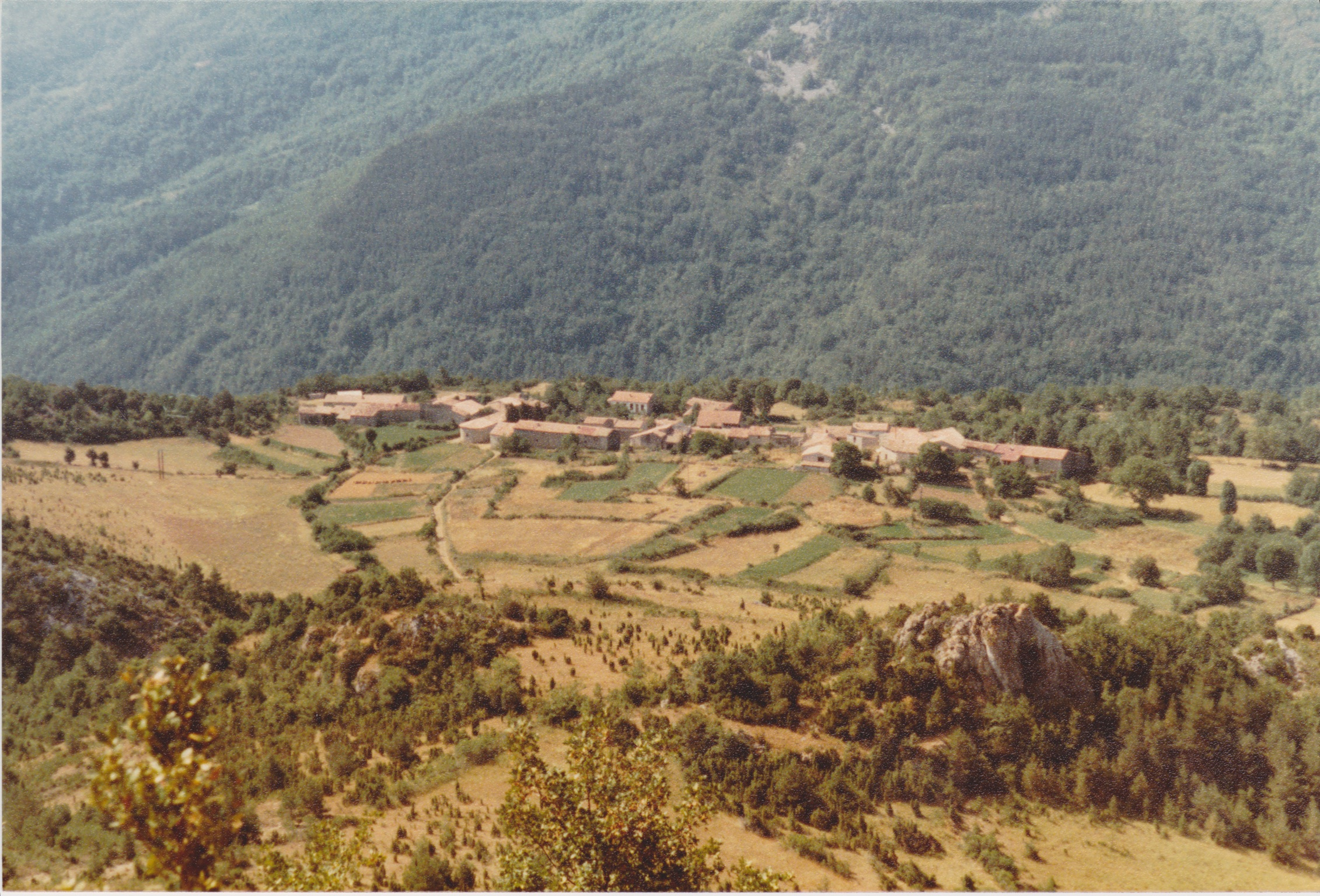
View of the French village of Quirbajou in the summer of 1985

== See also ==
- Communes of the Aude department
