= Cassaignes =

Commune in Occitanie, France

- Commune
- Coat of arms
- Location of Cassaignes
- Location within France Location within Occitanie
- Coordinates: 42°56′48″N 2°18′00″E
- Country: France
- Region: Occitania
- Department: Aude
- Arrondissement: Limoux
- Canton: La Haute-Vallée de l'Aude

Government
  - Mayor (2020–2026): Serge Ferrié
- Area^{1}: 3.74 km^{2} (1.44 sq mi)
- Elevation: 269 m (883 ft)
- Highest elevation: 486 m (1,594 ft)
- Lowest elevation: 252 m (827 ft)
- Population (2023): 61
  - Density: 16/km^{2} (42/sq mi)
- Time zone: UTC+01:00 (CET)
  - Summer (DST): UTC+02:00 (CEST)
- INSEE/Postal code: 11073 /11190
- ^{1} French Land Register data, which excludes lakes, ponds, glaciers > 1 km^{2} (0.386 sq mi or 247 acres) and river estuaries.

Cassaignes (French pronunciation: [kasɛɲ]; Occitan: Cassanhas) is a commune in the Aude department in southern France.

== Population ==
Historical population
| Year | Pop. | ±% p.a. |
|---|---|---|
| 1968 | 33 | — |
| 1975 | 27 | −2.83% |
| 1982 | 30 | +1.52% |
| 1990 | 44 | +4.90% |
| 1999 | 49 | +1.20% |
| 2007 | 63 | +3.19% |
| 2012 | 57 | −1.98% |
| 2017 | 56 | −0.35% |
| 2023 | 61 | +1.44% |
Source: INSEE

== See also ==
- Communes of the Aude department
