= Canton of La Haute-Vallée de l'Aude =

Coordinates: 42.88°N 2.18°E

- Canton
- Situation of the canton of La Haute-Vallée de l'Aude in the department of Aude
- Country: France
- Region: Occitania
- Department: Aude
- No. of communes: {{{nbcomm}}}
- Population (2023): 17,776
- INSEE code: 1114

The canton of La Haute-Vallée de l'Aude (before 2015: canton of Quillan) is an administrative division of the Aude department, southern France. Its borders were modified at the French canton reorganisation which came into effect in March 2015. Its seat is in Quillan.

It consists of the following communes:

1. Antugnac
2. Arques
3. Artigues
4. Aunat
5. Axat
6. Belcaire
7. Belfort-sur-Rebenty
8. Belvianes-et-Cavirac
9. Belvis
10. Bessède-de-Sault
11. Le Bousquet
12. Bugarach
13. Cailla
14. Campagna-de-Sault
15. Campagne-sur-Aude
16. Camps-sur-l'Agly
17. Camurac
18. Cassaignes
19. Chalabre
20. Le Clat
21. Comus
22. Corbières
23. Coudons
24. Couiza
25. Counozouls
26. Courtauly
27. Coustaussa
28. Cubières-sur-Cinoble
29. Escouloubre
30. Espéraza
31. Espezel
32. La Fajolle
33. Fontanès-de-Sault
34. Fourtou
35. Galinagues
36. Gincla
37. Ginoles
38. Granès
39. Joucou
40. Luc-sur-Aude
41. Marsa
42. Mazuby
43. Mérial
44. Missègre
45. Montazels
46. Montfort-sur-Boulzane
47. Montjardin
48. Nébias
49. Niort-de-Sault
50. Peyrefitte-du-Razès
51. Peyrolles
52. Puilaurens
53. Puivert
54. Quillan
55. Quirbajou
56. Rennes-le-Château
57. Rennes-les-Bains
58. Rivel
59. Rodome
60. Roquefeuil
61. Roquefort-de-Sault
62. Roquetaillade-et-Conilhac
63. Saint-Benoît
64. Sainte-Colombe-sur-Guette
65. Sainte-Colombe-sur-l'Hers
66. Saint-Ferriol
67. Saint-Jean-de-Paracol
68. Saint-Julia-de-Bec
69. Saint-Just-et-le-Bézu
70. Saint-Louis-et-Parahou
71. Saint-Martin-Lys
72. Salvezines
73. La Serpent
74. Serres
75. Sonnac-sur-l'Hers
76. Sougraigne
77. Terroles
78. Tréziers
79. Val-de-Lambronne
80. Val-du-Faby
81. Valmigère
82. Villefort
