= Belvis =

Commune in Occitanie, France

- Commune
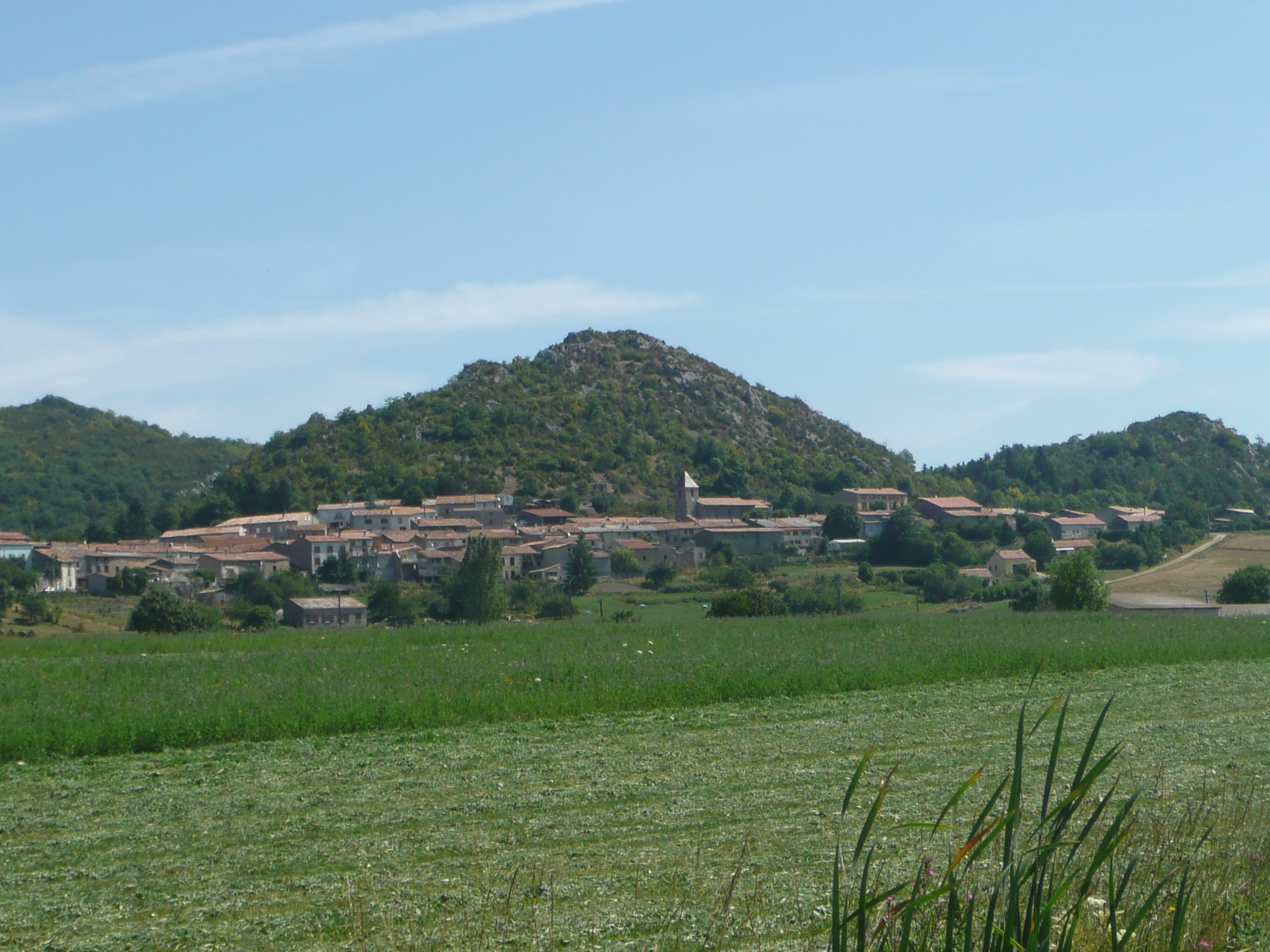
- A general view of Belvis

- Coat of arms
- Location of Belvis
- Location within France Location within Occitanie
- Coordinates: 42°51′05″N 2°04′35″E
- Country: France
- Region: Occitania
- Department: Aude
- Arrondissement: Limoux
- Canton: La Haute-Vallée de l'Aude

Government
  - Mayor (2020–2026): Georges Ramon
- Area^{1}: 23.61 km^{2} (9.12 sq mi)
- Elevation: 935 m (3,068 ft)
- Highest elevation: 1,260 m (4,130 ft)
- Lowest elevation: 679 m (2,228 ft)
- Population (2023): 166
  - Density: 7.03/km^{2} (18.2/sq mi)
- Time zone: UTC+01:00 (CET)
  - Summer (DST): UTC+02:00 (CEST)
- INSEE/Postal code: 11036 /11340
- ^{1} French Land Register data, which excludes lakes, ponds, glaciers > 1 km^{2} (0.386 sq mi or 247 acres) and river estuaries.

Belvis (French pronunciation: [bɛlvis]; Occitan: Belvís) is a commune in the Aude department in southern France. Its inhabitants are called the Belvisois.

== Population ==
Historical population
Year	Pop.	±% p.a.
1968	245	—
1975	187	−3.79%
1982	166	−1.69%
1990	153	−1.01%
1999	169	+1.11%
2007	178	+0.65%
2012	167	−1.27%
2017	160	−0.85%
2023	166	+0.62%
Source: INSEE

== See also ==
- Communes of the Aude department
