= Saint-Jean-de-Paracol =

Commune in Occitanie, France

- Commune
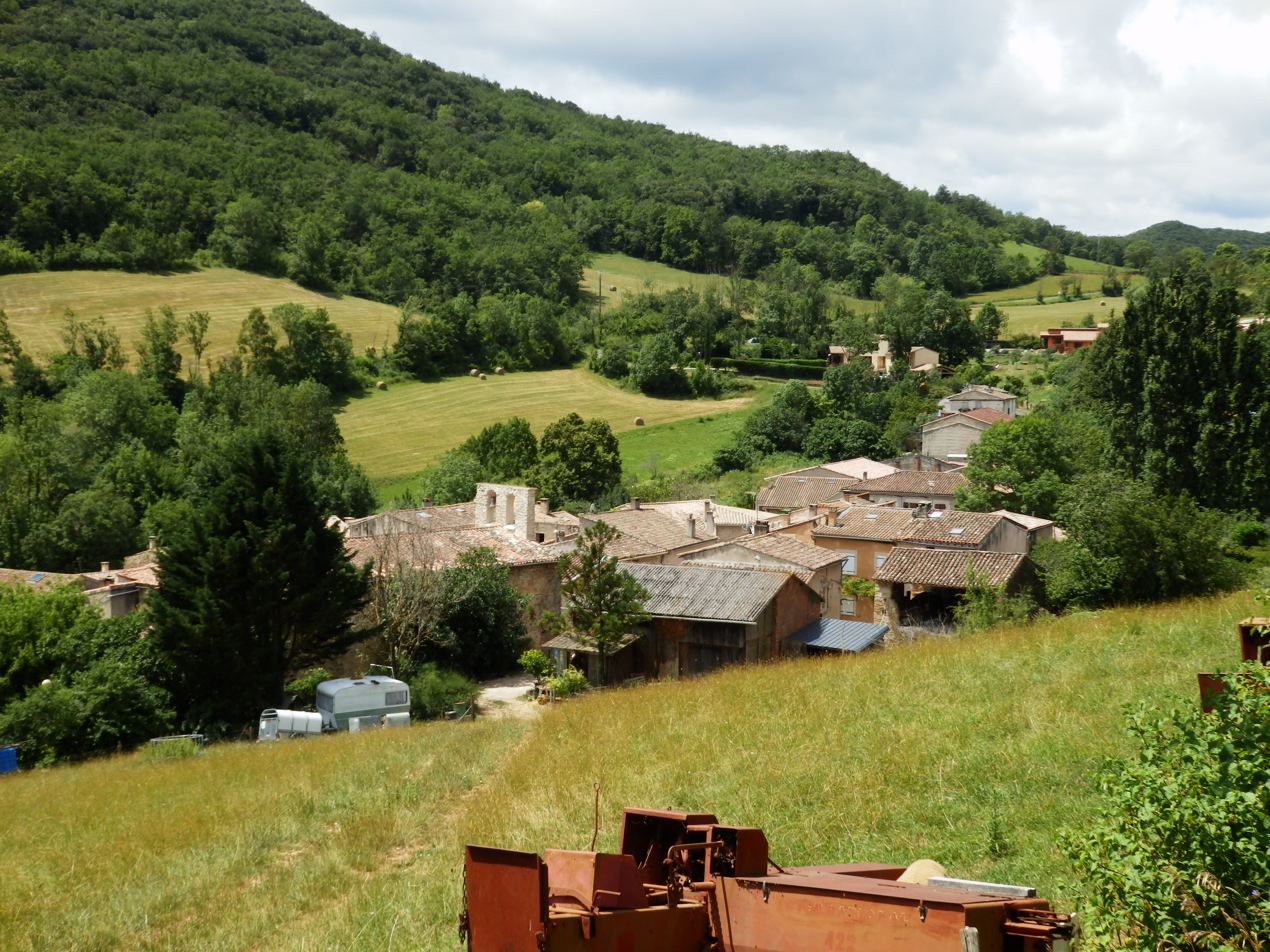
- A general view of Saint-Jean-de-Paracol
- Location of Saint-Jean-de-Paracol
- Location within France Location within Occitanie
- Coordinates: 42°56′12″N 2°06′53″E
- Country: France
- Region: Occitania
- Department: Aude
- Arrondissement: Limoux
- Canton: La Haute-Vallée de l'Aude

Government
  - Mayor (2020–2026): Cédric Plichard
- Area^{1}: 7.08 km^{2} (2.73 sq mi)
- Elevation: 600 m (2,000 ft)
- Highest elevation: 726 m (2,382 ft)
- Lowest elevation: 316 m (1,037 ft)
- Population (2023): 139
  - Density: 19.6/km^{2} (50.8/sq mi)
- Time zone: UTC+01:00 (CET)
  - Summer (DST): UTC+02:00 (CEST)
- INSEE/Postal code: 11346 /11260
- ^{1} French Land Register data, which excludes lakes, ponds, glaciers > 1 km^{2} (0.386 sq mi or 247 acres) and river estuaries.

Saint-Jean-de-Paracol (French pronunciation: [sɛ̃ ʒɑ̃ də paʁakɔl]; Languedocien: Sant Joan de Paracòl) is a commune in the Aude department in southern France.

== Population ==
Historical population
Year	Pop.	±% p.a.
1968	103	—
1975	95	−1.15%
1982	93	−0.30%
1990	83	−1.41%
1999	94	+1.39%
2007	109	+1.87%
2012	111	+0.36%
2017	124	+2.24%
2023	139	+1.92%
Source: INSEE

== See also ==
- Communes of the Aude department
