= Rivel =

Commune in Occitanie, France

- Commune
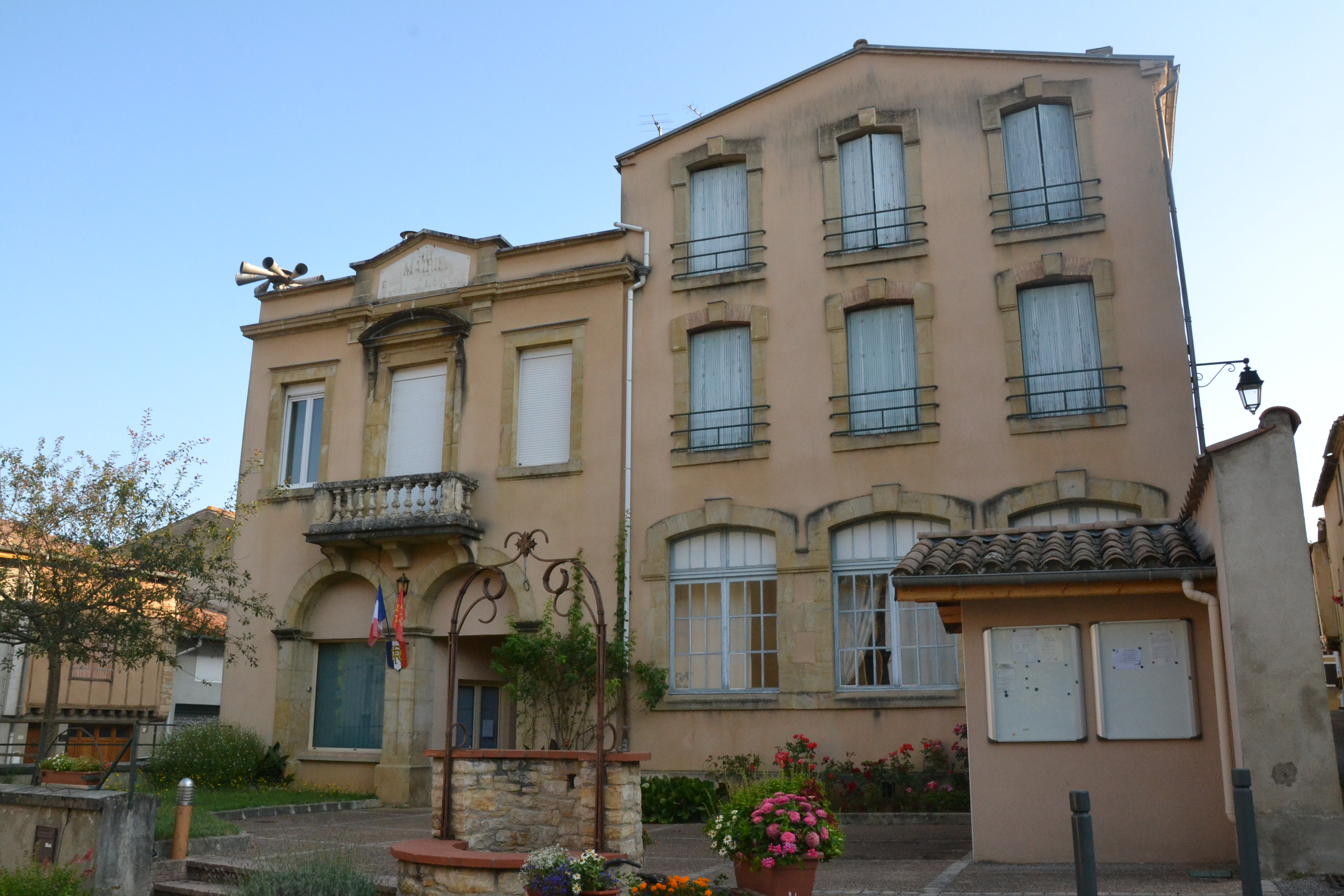
- The town hall in Rivel

- Coat of arms
- Location of Rivel
- Location within France Location within Occitanie
- Coordinates: 42°56′43″N 2°00′04″E
- Country: France
- Region: Occitania
- Department: Aude
- Arrondissement: Limoux
- Canton: La Haute-Vallée de l'Aude
- Intercommunality: Pyrénées audoises

Government
  - Mayor (2020–2026): Jerome Artigues
- Area^{1}: 24.3 km^{2} (9.4 sq mi)
- Elevation: 400 m (1,300 ft)
- Highest elevation: 1,090 m (3,580 ft)
- Lowest elevation: 381 m (1,250 ft)
- Population (2023): 219
  - Density: 9.01/km^{2} (23.3/sq mi)
- Time zone: UTC+01:00 (CET)
  - Summer (DST): UTC+02:00 (CEST)
- INSEE/Postal code: 11316 /11230
- ^{1} French Land Register data, which excludes lakes, ponds, glaciers > 1 km^{2} (0.386 sq mi or 247 acres) and river estuaries.

Rivel (French pronunciation: [ʁivɛl]; Occitan: Rivèlh) is a commune in the Aude department in southern France.

== Heraldry ==
Arms of Rivel	Tierced in reversed pairle: 1st azure with the bell tower of the church of the place [church of Sainte-Cécile], or, pierced of the field and campaned sable, 2nd argent with a fir tree cut vert and trunked tenné, 3rd gules with a wavy silver bend lowered, surmounted by a cross clechée, voided and pommée of twelve pieces or. Coat of arms on the commune's Facebook page, 2025. Authors: JF Binon

== Population ==
Historical population
Year	Pop.	±% p.a.
1968	365	—
1975	312	−2.22%
1982	270	−2.04%
1990	233	−1.83%
1999	211	−1.10%
2007	220	+0.52%
2012	217	−0.27%
2017	199	−1.72%
2023	219	+1.61%
Source: INSEE

== See also ==
- Communes of the Aude department
