= Camurac =

Commune in Occitanie, France

- Commune
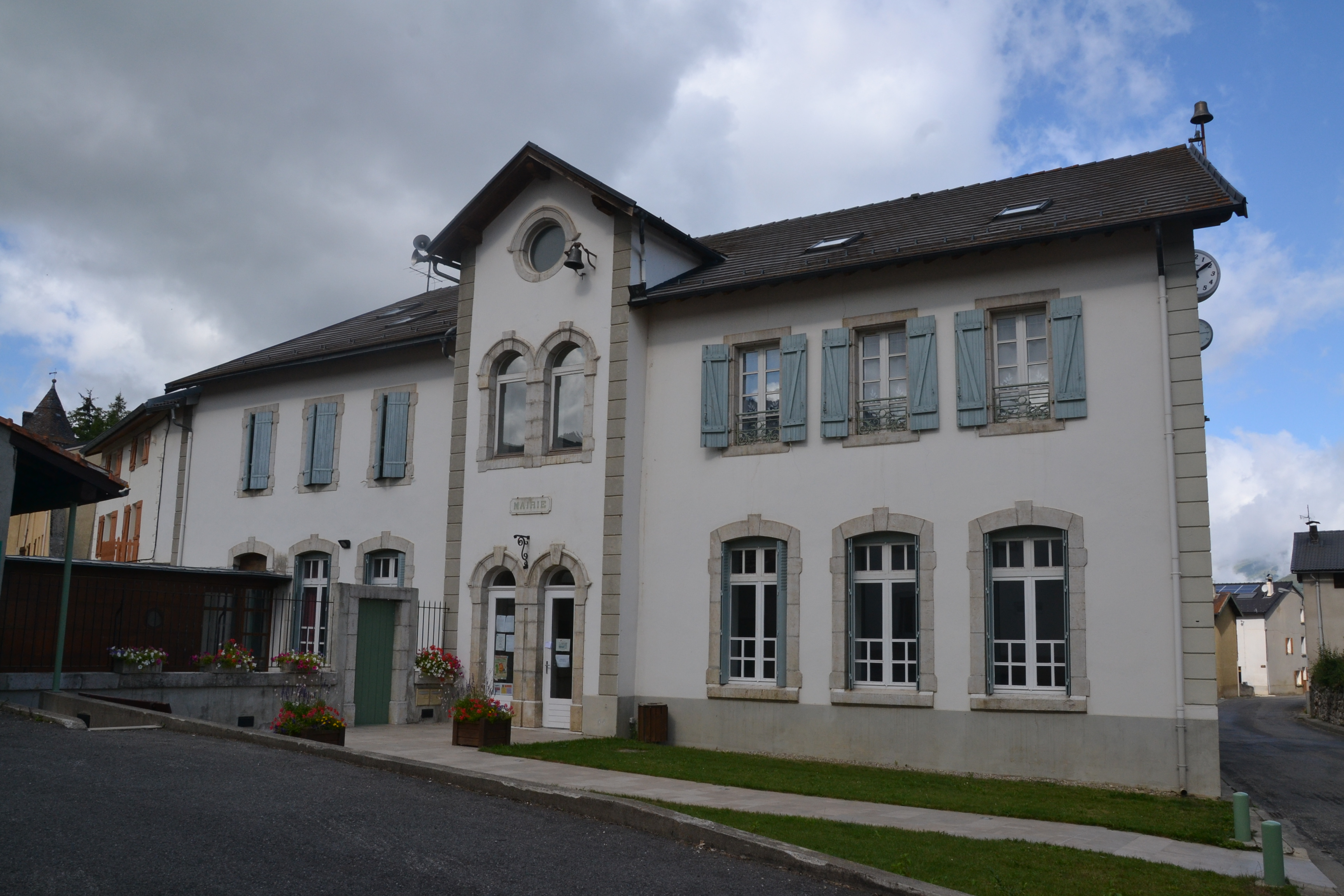
- The town hall in Camurac

- Coat of arms
- Location of Camurac
- Location within France Location within Occitanie
- Coordinates: 42°47′57″N 1°54′57″E
- Country: France
- Region: Occitania
- Department: Aude
- Arrondissement: Limoux
- Canton: La Haute-Vallée de l'Aude

Government
  - Mayor (2020–2026): Bernard Vaquie
- Area^{1}: 11.61 km^{2} (4.48 sq mi)
- Elevation: 1,200 m (3,900 ft)
- Highest elevation: 1,764 m (5,787 ft)
- Lowest elevation: 1,134 m (3,720 ft)
- Population (2023): 110
  - Density: 9.5/km^{2} (25/sq mi)
- Time zone: UTC+01:00 (CET)
  - Summer (DST): UTC+02:00 (CEST)
- INSEE/Postal code: 11066 /11340
- ^{1} French Land Register data, which excludes lakes, ponds, glaciers > 1 km^{2} (0.386 sq mi or 247 acres) and river estuaries.

Camurac (French pronunciation: [kamyʁak]) is a commune of the Aude department southern France.

It is located in the Pyrenees about 25 km from the border of Andorra.

== Population ==
Historical population
| Year | Pop. | ±% p.a. |
|---|---|---|
| 1968 | 160 | — |
| 1975 | 176 | +1.37% |
| 1982 | 134 | −3.82% |
| 1990 | 149 | +1.34% |
| 1999 | 132 | −1.34% |
| 2007 | 125 | −0.68% |
| 2012 | 116 | −1.48% |
| 2017 | 98 | −3.32% |
| 2023 | 110 | +1.94% |
Source: INSEE

== See also ==
- Communes of the Aude department
