= Valmigère =

Commune in Occitanie, France

- Commune
- Coat of arms
- Location of Valmigère
- Location within France Location within Occitanie
- Coordinates: 42°58′58″N 2°22′35″E
- Country: France
- Region: Occitania
- Department: Aude
- Arrondissement: Limoux
- Canton: La Haute-Vallée de l'Aude
- Intercommunality: Limouxin

Government
  - Mayor (2020–2026): Isabelle Fouquet
- Area^{1}: 5.94 km^{2} (2.29 sq mi)
- Elevation: 692 m (2,270 ft)
- Highest elevation: 926 m (3,038 ft)
- Lowest elevation: 596 m (1,955 ft)
- Population (2023): 28
  - Density: 4.7/km^{2} (12/sq mi)
- Time zone: UTC+01:00 (CET)
  - Summer (DST): UTC+02:00 (CEST)
- INSEE/Postal code: 11402 /11580
- ^{1} French Land Register data, which excludes lakes, ponds, glaciers > 1 km^{2} (0.386 sq mi or 247 acres) and river estuaries.

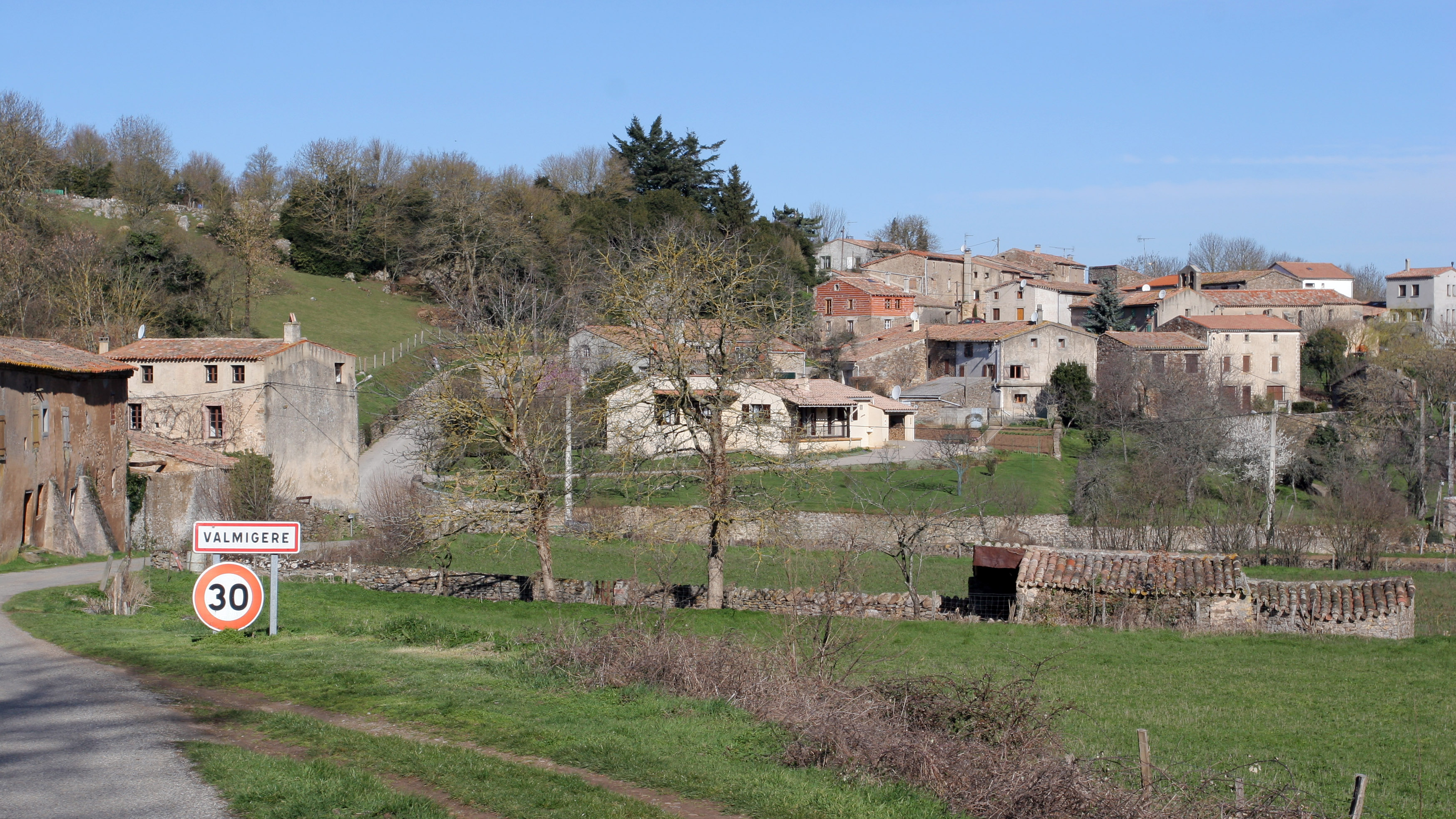
The village of Valmigère

Valmigère (French pronunciation: [valmiʒɛʁ]; Occitan: Valmigièira) is a commune in the Aude department in southern France.

== Population ==
Historical population
Year	Pop.	±% p.a.
1968	37	—
1975	37	+0.00%
1982	32	−2.05%
1990	23	−4.04%
1999	25	+0.93%
2007	21	−2.16%
2012	18	−3.04%
2017	17	−1.14%
2023	28	+8.67%
Source: INSEE

== See also ==
- Communes of the Aude department
