= Espezel =

Commune in Occitanie, France

- Commune
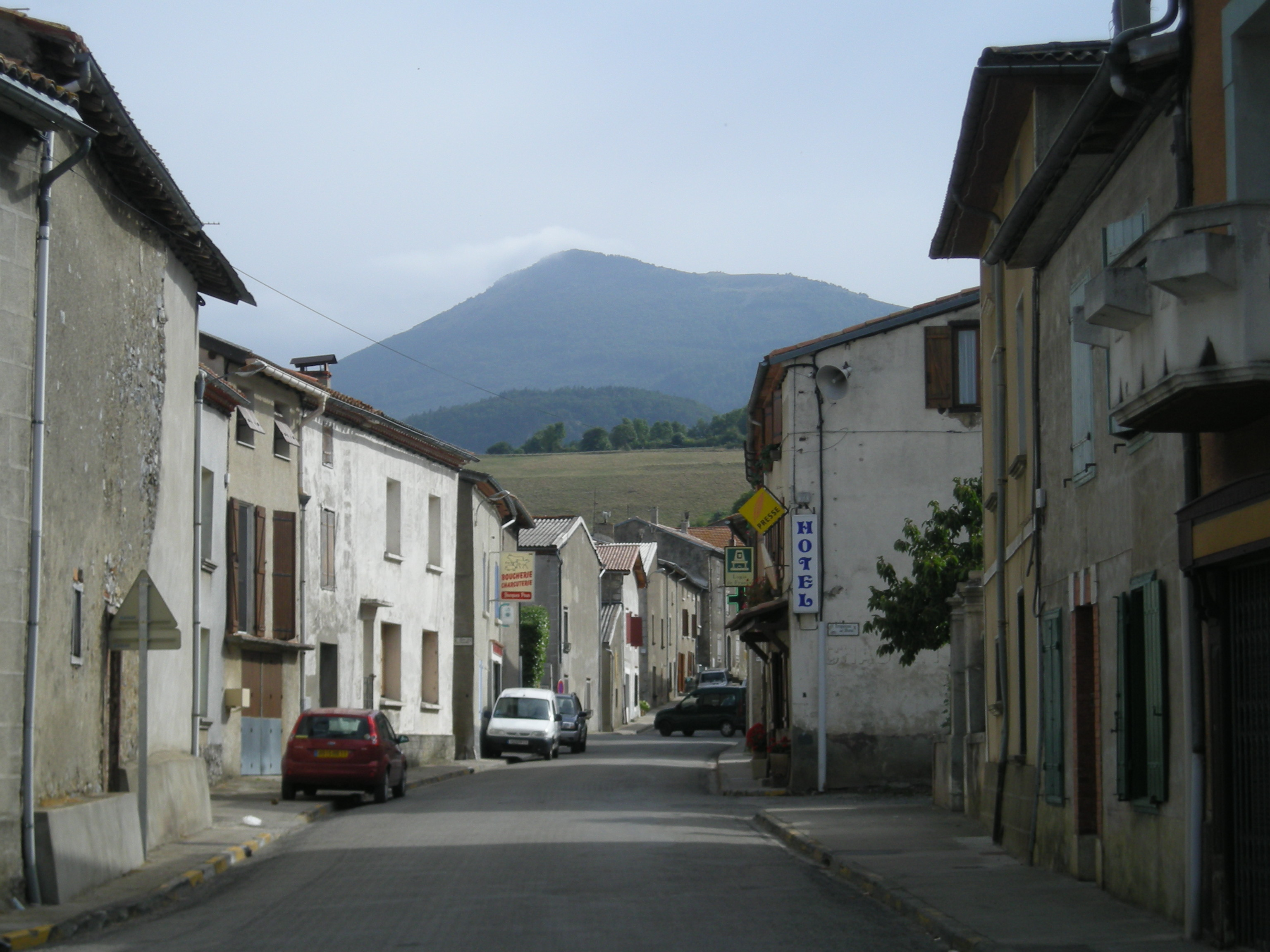
- A view within Espezel

- Coat of arms
- Location of Espezel
- Location within France Location within Occitanie
- Coordinates: 42°49′21″N 2°01′20″E
- Country: France
- Region: Occitania
- Department: Aude
- Arrondissement: Limoux
- Canton: La Haute-Vallée de l'Aude

Government
  - Mayor (2020–2026): François Lacroix
- Area^{1}: 14.31 km^{2} (5.53 sq mi)
- Elevation: 900 m (3,000 ft)
- Highest elevation: 1,100 m (3,600 ft)
- Lowest elevation: 733 m (2,405 ft)
- Population (2023): 238
  - Density: 16.6/km^{2} (43.1/sq mi)
- Time zone: UTC+01:00 (CET)
  - Summer (DST): UTC+02:00 (CEST)
- INSEE/Postal code: 11130 /11340
- ^{1} French Land Register data, which excludes lakes, ponds, glaciers > 1 km^{2} (0.386 sq mi or 247 acres) and river estuaries.

Espezel (French pronunciation: [ɛspəzɛl]; Occitan: Espesèlh) is a commune in the Aude department in southern France.

== Population ==
Historical population
Year	Pop.	±% p.a.
1968	334	—
1975	279	−2.54%
1982	228	−2.84%
1990	201	−1.56%
1999	208	+0.38%
2007	206	−0.12%
2012	209	+0.29%
2017	206	−0.29%
2023	238	+2.44%
Source: INSEE

== See also ==
- Communes of the Aude department
