= Mazuby =

Commune in Occitanie, France

- Commune
- Coat of arms
- Location of Mazuby
- Location within France Location within Occitanie
- Coordinates: 42°48′08″N 2°02′02″E
- Country: France
- Region: Occitania
- Department: Aude
- Arrondissement: Limoux
- Canton: La Haute-Vallée de l'Aude

Government
  - Mayor (2020–2026): Francis Savy
- Area^{1}: 8.96 km^{2} (3.46 sq mi)
- Elevation: 940 m (3,080 ft)
- Highest elevation: 1,933 m (6,342 ft)
- Lowest elevation: 749 m (2,457 ft)
- Population (2023): 21
  - Density: 2.3/km^{2} (6.1/sq mi)
- Time zone: UTC+01:00 (CET)
  - Summer (DST): UTC+02:00 (CEST)
- INSEE/Postal code: 11229 /11140
- ^{1} French Land Register data, which excludes lakes, ponds, glaciers > 1 km^{2} (0.386 sq mi or 247 acres) and river estuaries.

Mazuby (French pronunciation: [mazybi]; Occitan: Masubi) is a commune in the Aude department in southern France.

== Population ==
Historical population
Year	Pop.	±% p.a.
1968	72	—
1975	51	−4.81%
1982	41	−3.07%
1990	35	−1.96%
1999	25	−3.67%
2007	25	+0.00%
2012	25	+0.00%
2017	25	+0.00%
2023	21	−2.86%
Source: INSEE

== See also ==
- Communes of the Aude department
