= Courtauly =

Commune in Occitanie, France

- Commune
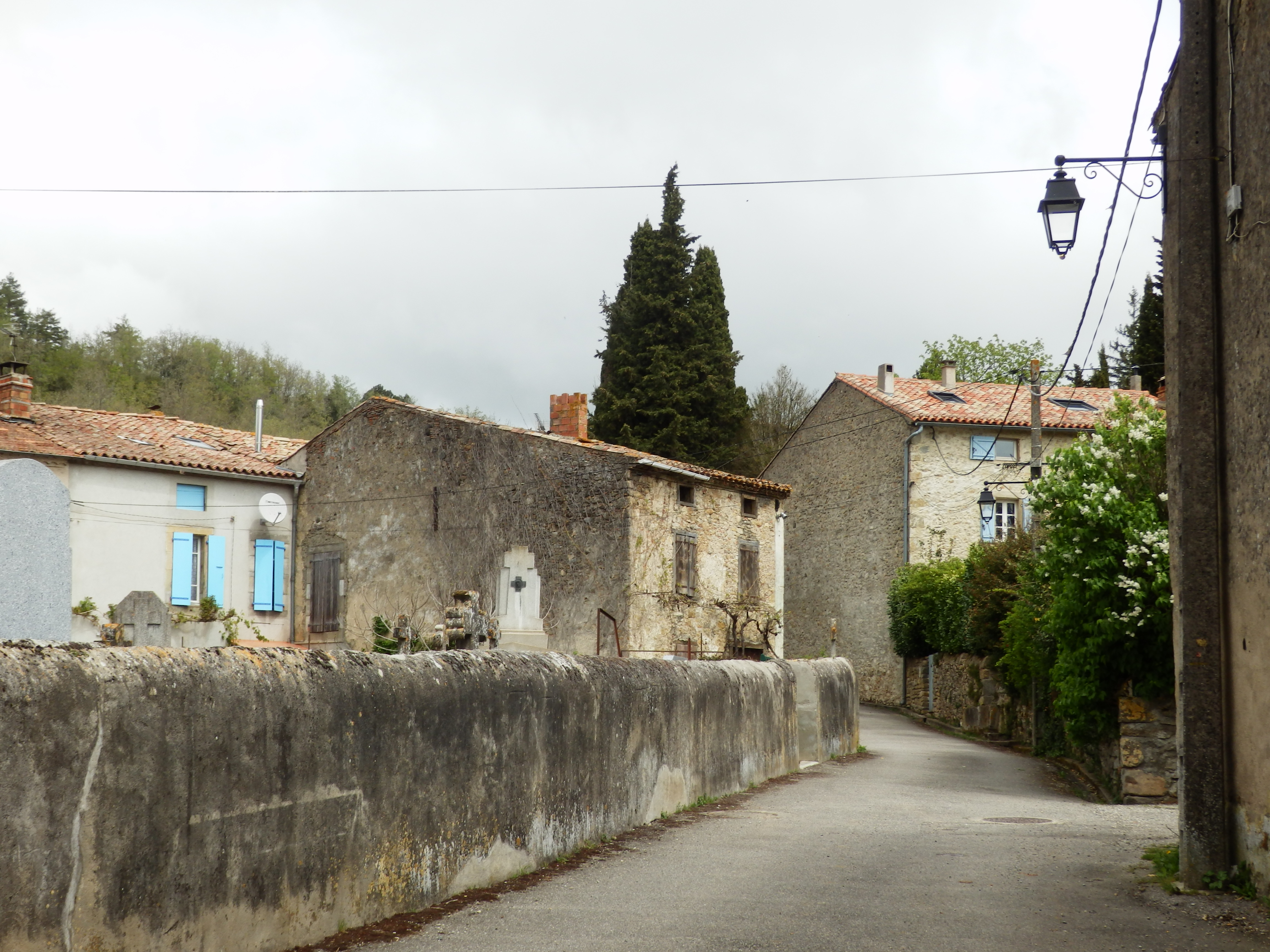
- A view within Courtauly

- Coat of arms
- Location of Courtauly
- Location within France Location within Occitanie
- Coordinates: 43°02′27″N 2°02′38″E
- Country: France
- Region: Occitania
- Department: Aude
- Arrondissement: Limoux
- Canton: La Haute-Vallée de l'Aude

Government
  - Mayor (2020–2026): André Gérard Penando
- Area^{1}: 7.72 km^{2} (2.98 sq mi)
- Highest elevation: 581 m (1,906 ft)
- Lowest elevation: 380 m (1,250 ft)
- Population (2023): 73
  - Density: 9.5/km^{2} (24/sq mi)
- Time zone: UTC+01:00 (CET)
  - Summer (DST): UTC+02:00 (CEST)
- INSEE/Postal code: 11107 /11230
- ^{1} French Land Register data, which excludes lakes, ponds, glaciers > 1 km^{2} (0.386 sq mi or 247 acres) and river estuaries.

Courtauly (French pronunciation: [kuʁtoli]; Occitan: Cortaulin) is a commune in the Aude department in southern France.

== Population ==
Historical population
Year	Pop.	±% p.a.
1968	76	—
1975	66	−2.00%
1982	61	−1.12%
1990	64	+0.60%
1999	73	+1.47%
2007	74	+0.17%
2012	74	+0.00%
2017	73	−0.27%
2023	73	+0.00%
Source: INSEE

== See also ==
- Communes of the Aude department
