= Saint-Julia-de-Bec =

Commune in Occitanie, France

- Commune
- Coat of arms
- Location of Saint-Julia-de-Bec
- Location within France Location within Occitanie
- Coordinates: 42°52′10″N 2°14′47″E
- Country: France
- Region: Occitania
- Department: Aude
- Arrondissement: Limoux
- Canton: La Haute-Vallée de l'Aude

Government
  - Mayor (2020–2026): Didier Aveilha
- Area^{1}: 13.88 km^{2} (5.36 sq mi)
- Elevation: 400 m (1,300 ft)
- Highest elevation: 855 m (2,805 ft)
- Lowest elevation: 355 m (1,165 ft)
- Population (2023): 98
  - Density: 7.1/km^{2} (18/sq mi)
- Time zone: UTC+01:00 (CET)
  - Summer (DST): UTC+02:00 (CEST)
- INSEE/Postal code: 11347 /11500
- ^{1} French Land Register data, which excludes lakes, ponds, glaciers > 1 km^{2} (0.386 sq mi or 247 acres) and river estuaries.

Saint-Julia-de-Bec (French: [sɛ̃ ʒylja də bɛk]; Occitan: Sant Jolian de Bèc) is a commune in the Aude department in southern France.

== Population ==
Historical population
Year	Pop.	±% p.a.
1968	129	—
1975	105	−2.90%
1982	101	−0.55%
1990	97	−0.50%
1999	97	+0.00%
2007	119	+2.59%
2012	98	−3.81%
2017	104	+1.20%
2023	98	−0.99%
Source: INSEE

== See also ==
- Communes of the Aude department
