= Cubières-sur-Cinoble =

Commune in Occitanie, France

- Commune
- Coat of arms
- Location of Cubières-sur-Cinoble
- Location within France Location within Occitanie
- Coordinates: 42°51′43″N 2°27′42″E
- Country: France
- Region: Occitania
- Department: Aude
- Arrondissement: Limoux
- Canton: La Haute-Vallée de l'Aude

Government
  - Mayor (2020–2026): Maryse Baillat
- Area^{1}: 14.48 km^{2} (5.59 sq mi)
- Elevation: 446 m (1,463 ft)
- Highest elevation: 893 m (2,930 ft)
- Lowest elevation: 360 m (1,180 ft)
- Population (2023): 83
  - Density: 5.7/km^{2} (15/sq mi)
- Time zone: UTC+01:00 (CET)
  - Summer (DST): UTC+02:00 (CEST)
- INSEE/Postal code: 11112 /11190
- ^{1} French Land Register data, which excludes lakes, ponds, glaciers > 1 km^{2} (0.386 sq mi or 247 acres) and river estuaries.

Cubières-sur-Cinoble (French pronunciation: [kybjɛʁ syʁ sinɔbl]; Occitan: Cubièra) is a commune in the Aude department in southern France.

== Population ==
Historical population
Year	Pop.	±% p.a.
1968	56	—
1975	39	−5.04%
1982	64	+7.33%
1990	64	+0.00%
1999	64	+0.00%
2007	86	+3.76%
2012	99	+2.86%
2017	96	−0.61%
2023	83	−2.40%
Source: INSEE

== See also ==
- Communes of the Aude department
