= Missègre =

Commune in Occitanie, France

- Commune
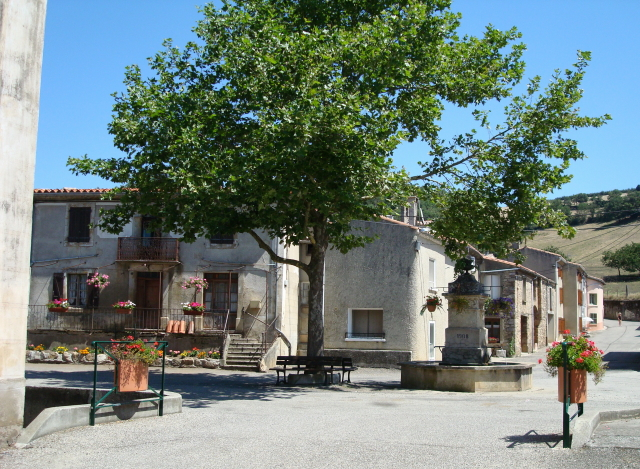
- The main square and fountain in Missègre

- Coat of arms
- Location of Missègre
- Location within France Location within Occitanie
- Coordinates: 43°00′16″N 2°22′24″E
- Country: France
- Region: Occitania
- Department: Aude
- Arrondissement: Limoux
- Canton: La Haute-Vallée de l'Aude

Government
  - Mayor (2020–2026): Frédéric Belotti
- Area^{1}: 7.28 km^{2} (2.81 sq mi)
- Elevation: 610 m (2,000 ft)
- Highest elevation: 824 m (2,703 ft)
- Lowest elevation: 545 m (1,788 ft)
- Population (2023): 72
  - Density: 9.9/km^{2} (26/sq mi)
- Time zone: UTC+01:00 (CET)
  - Summer (DST): UTC+02:00 (CEST)
- INSEE/Postal code: 11235 /11580
- ^{1} French Land Register data, which excludes lakes, ponds, glaciers > 1 km^{2} (0.386 sq mi or 247 acres) and river estuaries.

Missègre (French pronunciation: [misɛɡʁ]; Occitan: Missegre) is a commune in the Aude department in southern France.

== Population ==
Historical population
Year	Pop.	±% p.a.
1968	96	—
1975	75	−3.47%
1982	79	+0.75%
1990	78	−0.16%
1999	66	−1.84%
2007	66	+0.00%
2012	67	+0.30%
2017	63	−1.22%
2023	72	+2.25%
Source: INSEE

== See also ==
- Communes of the Aude department
