= Counozouls =

Commune in Occitanie, France

- Commune
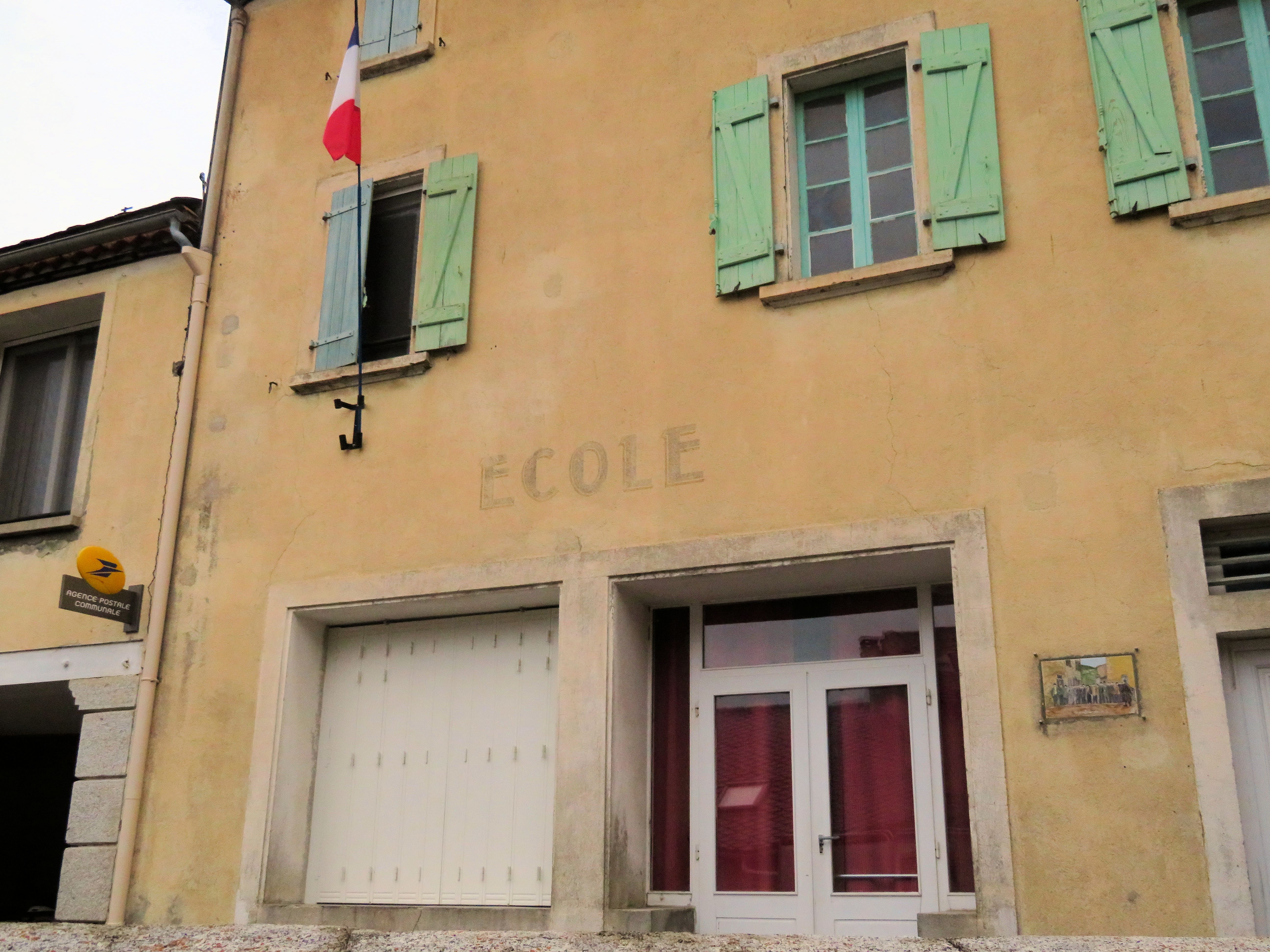
- The town hall in Counozouls

- Coat of arms
- Location of Counozouls
- Location within France Location within Occitanie
- Coordinates: 42°43′58″N 2°13′41″E
- Country: France
- Region: Occitania
- Department: Aude
- Arrondissement: Limoux
- Canton: La Haute-Vallée de l'Aude
- Intercommunality: Pyrénées Audoises

Government
  - Mayor (2020–2026): Patrick de Boissieu
- Area^{1}: 27.8 km^{2} (10.7 sq mi)
- Elevation: 942 m (3,091 ft)
- Highest elevation: 2,424 m (7,953 ft)
- Lowest elevation: 677 m (2,221 ft)
- Population (2023): 57
  - Density: 2.1/km^{2} (5.3/sq mi)
- Time zone: UTC+01:00 (CET)
  - Summer (DST): UTC+02:00 (CEST)
- INSEE/Postal code: 11104 /11140
- ^{1} French Land Register data, which excludes lakes, ponds, glaciers > 1 km^{2} (0.386 sq mi or 247 acres) and river estuaries.

Counozouls is a commune in the Aude department in southern France.

== Population ==
Historical population
| Year | Pop. | ±% p.a. |
|---|---|---|
| 1968 | 78 | — |
| 1975 | 65 | −2.57% |
| 1982 | 55 | −2.36% |
| 1990 | 52 | −0.70% |
| 1999 | 41 | −2.61% |
| 2007 | 46 | +1.45% |
| 2012 | 44 | −0.89% |
| 2017 | 48 | +1.76% |
| 2023 | 57 | +2.91% |
Source: INSEE

== See also ==
- Communes of the Aude department
