= Gincla =

Commune in Occitanie, France

- Commune
- Coat of arms
- Location of Gincla
- Location within France Location within Occitanie
- Coordinates: 42°45′49″N 2°19′34″E
- Country: France
- Region: Occitania
- Department: Aude
- Arrondissement: Limoux
- Canton: La Haute-Vallée de l'Aude
- Intercommunality: Pyrénées Audoises

Government
  - Mayor (2020–2026): Dominique Bruchet
- Area^{1}: 7.65 km^{2} (2.95 sq mi)
- Elevation: 570 m (1,870 ft)
- Highest elevation: 1,322 m (4,337 ft)
- Lowest elevation: 578 m (1,896 ft)
- Population (2023): 46
  - Density: 6.0/km^{2} (16/sq mi)
- Time zone: UTC+01:00 (CET)
  - Summer (DST): UTC+02:00 (CEST)
- INSEE/Postal code: 11163 /11140
- ^{1} French Land Register data, which excludes lakes, ponds, glaciers > 1 km^{2} (0.386 sq mi or 247 acres) and river estuaries.

Gincla (French pronunciation: [ʒɛ̃kla]; Occitan: Ginclar) is a commune in the Aude department in southern France.

== Population ==
Historical population
Year	Pop.	±% p.a.
1968	35	—
1975	19	−8.36%
1982	35	+9.12%
1990	49	+4.30%
1999	43	−1.44%
2007	45	+0.57%
2012	49	+1.72%
2017	48	−0.41%
2023	46	−0.71%
Source: INSEE

== See also ==
- Communes of the Aude department
