= Escouloubre =

Commune in Occitanie, France

- Commune
- Coat of arms
- Location of Escouloubre
- Location within France Location within Occitanie
- Coordinates: 42°44′24″N 2°07′30″E
- Country: France
- Region: Occitania
- Department: Aude
- Arrondissement: Limoux
- Canton: La Haute-Vallée de l'Aude
- Intercommunality: Pyrénées Audoises

Government
  - Mayor (2020–2026): Jacques Petit
- Area^{1}: 31.14 km^{2} (12.02 sq mi)
- Elevation: 900 m (3,000 ft)
- Highest elevation: 2,323 m (7,621 ft)
- Lowest elevation: 599 m (1,965 ft)
- Population (2023): 71
  - Density: 2.3/km^{2} (5.9/sq mi)
- Time zone: UTC+01:00 (CET)
  - Summer (DST): UTC+02:00 (CEST)
- INSEE/Postal code: 11127 /11140
- ^{1} French Land Register data, which excludes lakes, ponds, glaciers > 1 km^{2} (0.386 sq mi or 247 acres) and river estuaries.

Escouloubre (French pronunciation: [ɛskulubʁ]; Occitan: Escolobre) is a commune in the Aude department in southern France.

== Population ==
Historical population
Year	Pop.	±% p.a.
1968	137	—
1975	85	−6.59%
1982	86	+0.17%
1990	114	+3.59%
1999	90	−2.59%
2007	99	+1.20%
2012	89	−2.11%
2017	73	−3.89%
2023	71	−0.46%
Source: INSEE

== See also ==
- Communes of the Aude department
