= Le Bousquet =

Commune in Occitanie, France

- Commune
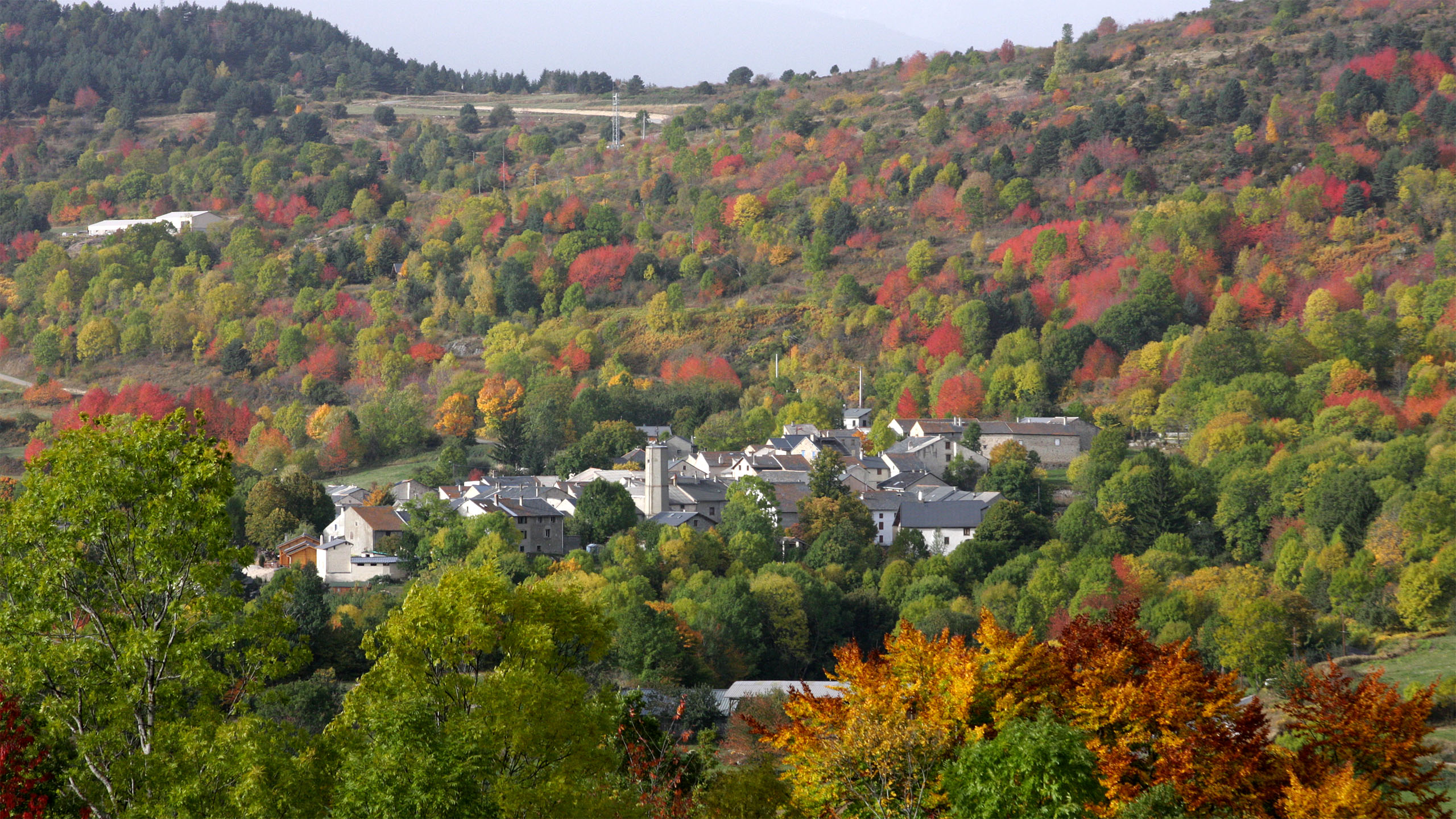

- Coat of arms
- Location of Le Bousquet
- Location within France Location within Occitanie
- Coordinates: 42°44′39″N 2°09′49″E
- Country: France
- Region: Occitania
- Department: Aude
- Arrondissement: Limoux
- Canton: La Haute-Vallée de l'Aude
- Intercommunality: Pyrénées Audoises

Government
  - Mayor (2020–2026): Christian Aragou
- Area^{1}: 25.99 km^{2} (10.03 sq mi)
- Elevation: 1,117 m (3,665 ft)
- Highest elevation: 2,447 m (8,028 ft)
- Lowest elevation: 907 m (2,976 ft)
- Population (2023): 39
  - Density: 1.5/km^{2} (3.9/sq mi)
- Time zone: UTC+01:00 (CET)
  - Summer (DST): UTC+02:00 (CEST)
- INSEE/Postal code: 11047 /11140
- ^{1} French Land Register data, which excludes lakes, ponds, glaciers > 1 km^{2} (0.386 sq mi or 247 acres) and river estuaries.

Le Bousquet (French pronunciation: [lə buskɛ]; Languedocien: El Bosquet) is a commune in the Aude department in southern France.

== Population ==
Historical population
Year	Pop.	±% p.a.
1968	68	—
1975	47	−5.14%
1982	39	−2.63%
1990	52	+3.66%
1999	53	+0.21%
2007	48	−1.23%
2012	44	−1.73%
2017	44	+0.00%
2023	39	−1.99%
Source: INSEE

== See also ==
- Communes of the Aude department
