= Granès =

Commune in Occitanie, France

- Commune
- Coat of arms
- Location of Granès
- Location within France Location within Occitanie
- Coordinates: 42°53′52″N 2°14′54″E
- Country: France
- Region: Occitania
- Department: Aude
- Arrondissement: Limoux
- Canton: La Haute-Vallée de l'Aude

Government
  - Mayor (2020–2026): Yves Aniort
- Area^{1}: 5.38 km^{2} (2.08 sq mi)
- Elevation: 372 m (1,220 ft)
- Highest elevation: 665 m (2,182 ft)
- Lowest elevation: 312 m (1,024 ft)
- Population (2023): 118
  - Density: 21.9/km^{2} (56.8/sq mi)
- Time zone: UTC+01:00 (CET)
  - Summer (DST): UTC+02:00 (CEST)
- INSEE/Postal code: 11168 /11500
- ^{1} French Land Register data, which excludes lakes, ponds, glaciers > 1 km^{2} (0.386 sq mi or 247 acres) and river estuaries.

Granès (French pronunciation: [ɡʁanɛs]; Occitan: Granes) is a commune in the Aude department in southern France.

== Population ==
Historical population
Year	Pop.	±% p.a.
1968	96	—
1975	82	−2.23%
1982	95	+2.12%
1990	111	+1.96%
1999	124	+1.24%
2007	124	+0.00%
2012	112	−2.02%
2017	97	−2.83%
2023	118	+3.32%
Source: INSEE

== See also ==
- Communes of the Aude department
