= Galinagues =

Commune in Occitanie, France

- Commune
- Coat of arms
- Location of Galinagues
- Location within France Location within Occitanie
- Coordinates: 42°48′31″N 2°02′46″E
- Country: France
- Region: Occitania
- Department: Aude
- Arrondissement: Limoux
- Canton: La Haute-Vallée de l'Aude

Government
  - Mayor (2020–2026): Patrick Emery
- Area^{1}: 4.14 km^{2} (1.60 sq mi)
- Elevation: 928 m (3,045 ft)
- Highest elevation: 1,098 m (3,602 ft)
- Lowest elevation: 736 m (2,415 ft)
- Population (2023): 29
  - Density: 7.0/km^{2} (18/sq mi)
- Time zone: UTC+01:00 (CET)
  - Summer (DST): UTC+02:00 (CEST)
- INSEE/Postal code: 11160 /11140
- ^{1} French Land Register data, which excludes lakes, ponds, glaciers > 1 km^{2} (0.386 sq mi or 247 acres) and river estuaries.

Galinagues (French pronunciation: [ɡalinaɡ]; Occitan: Galinagas) is a commune in the Aude department in southern France.

== Population ==
Historical population
Year	Pop.	±% p.a.
1968	42	—
1975	26	−6.62%
1982	31	+2.54%
1990	28	−1.26%
1999	41	+4.33%
2007	43	+0.60%
2012	29	−7.58%
2017	35	+3.83%
2023	29	−3.09%
Source: INSEE

== See also ==
- Communes of the Aude department
