= Peyrolles, Aude =

Commune in Occitanie, France

Peyrolles
- Commune
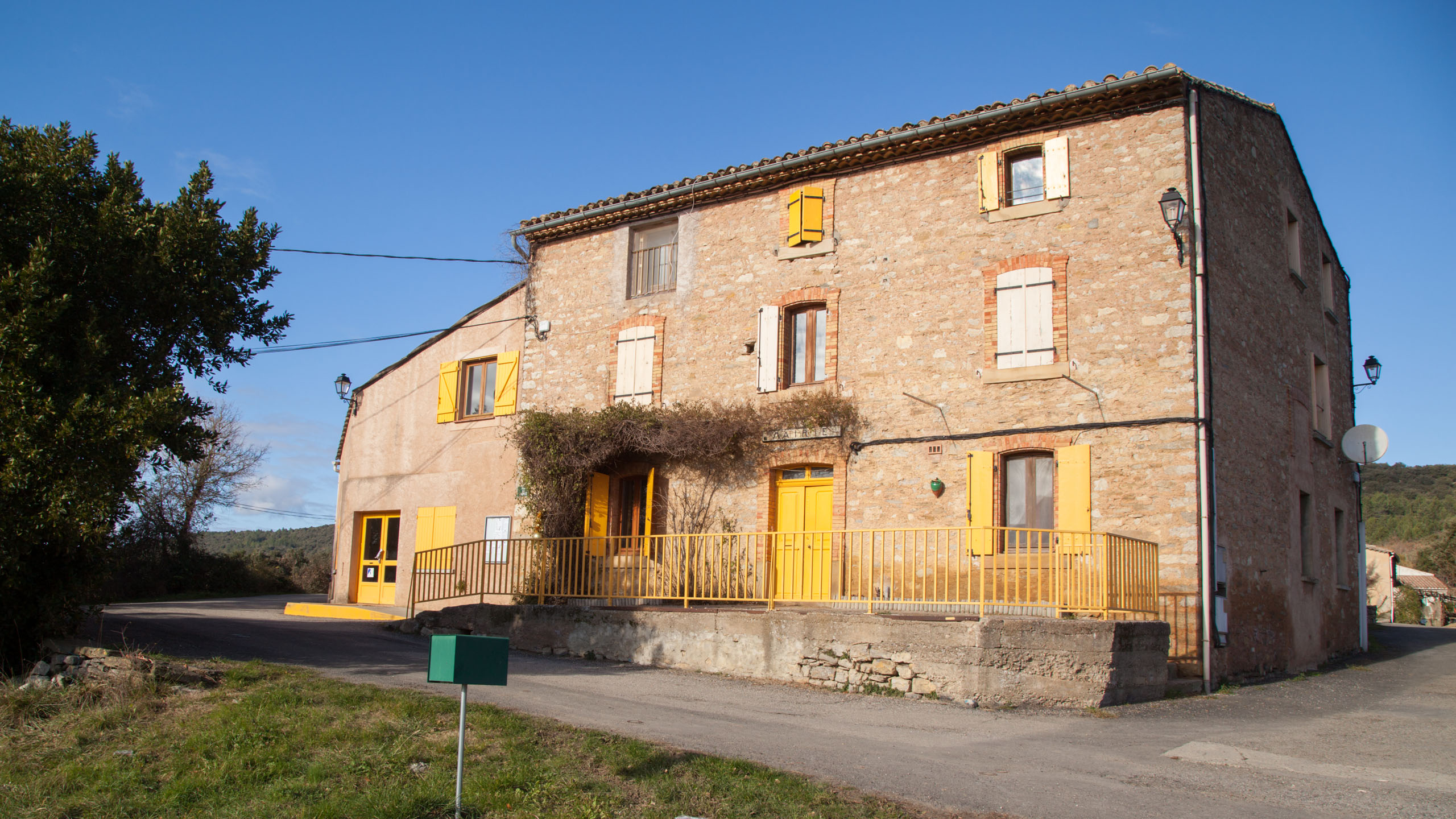
- Town hall

- Coat of arms
- Location of Peyrolles
- Location within France Location within Occitanie
- Coordinates: 42°57′10″N 2°20′18″E
- Country: France
- Region: Occitania
- Department: Aude
- Arrondissement: Limoux
- Canton: La Haute-Vallée de l'Aude

Government
  - Mayor (2020–2026): Eric Fromilhague
- Area^{1}: 14.49 km^{2} (5.59 sq mi)
- Elevation: 358 m (1,175 ft)
- Highest elevation: 764 m (2,507 ft)
- Lowest elevation: 280 m (920 ft)
- Population (2023): 91
  - Density: 6.3/km^{2} (16/sq mi)
- Time zone: UTC+01:00 (CET)
  - Summer (DST): UTC+02:00 (CEST)
- INSEE/Postal code: 11287 /11190
- ^{1} French Land Register data, which excludes lakes, ponds, glaciers > 1 km^{2} (0.386 sq mi or 247 acres) and river estuaries.

Peyrolles (French pronunciation: [peʁɔl]; Occitan: Peiròlas) is a commune in the Aude department in southern France.

== Population ==
Historical population
Year	Pop.	±% p.a.
1968	39	—
1975	38	−0.37%
1982	53	+4.87%
1990	53	+0.00%
1999	57	+0.81%
2007	68	+2.23%
2012	82	+3.82%
2017	86	+0.96%
2023	91	+0.95%
Source: INSEE

== See also ==
- Communes of the Aude department
