= Sougraigne =

Commune in Occitanie, France

- Commune
- Coat of arms
- Location of Sougraigne
- Location within France Location within Occitanie
- Coordinates: 42°54′06″N 2°21′19″E
- Country: France
- Region: Occitania
- Department: Aude
- Arrondissement: Limoux
- Canton: La Haute-Vallée de l'Aude

Government
  - Mayor (2020–2026): Nicole Socquet-Juglard
- Area^{1}: 18.43 km^{2} (7.12 sq mi)
- Elevation: 400 m (1,300 ft)
- Highest elevation: 854 m (2,802 ft)
- Lowest elevation: 329 m (1,079 ft)
- Population (2023): 125
  - Density: 6.78/km^{2} (17.6/sq mi)
- Time zone: UTC+01:00 (CET)
  - Summer (DST): UTC+02:00 (CEST)
- INSEE/Postal code: 11381 /11190
- ^{1} French Land Register data, which excludes lakes, ponds, glaciers > 1 km^{2} (0.386 sq mi or 247 acres) and river estuaries.

Sougraigne (French pronunciation: [suɡʁɛɲ]; Occitan: Sogranha) is a commune in the Aude department in southern France.

== Population ==
Historical population
Year	Pop.	±% p.a.
1968	53	—
1975	48	−1.41%
1982	56	+2.23%
1990	65	+1.88%
1999	54	−2.04%
2007	82	+5.36%
2012	82	+0.00%
2017	112	+6.43%
2023	125	+1.85%
Source: INSEE

== See also ==
- Communes of the Aude department
