= La Fajolle =

Commune in Occitanie, France

- Commune
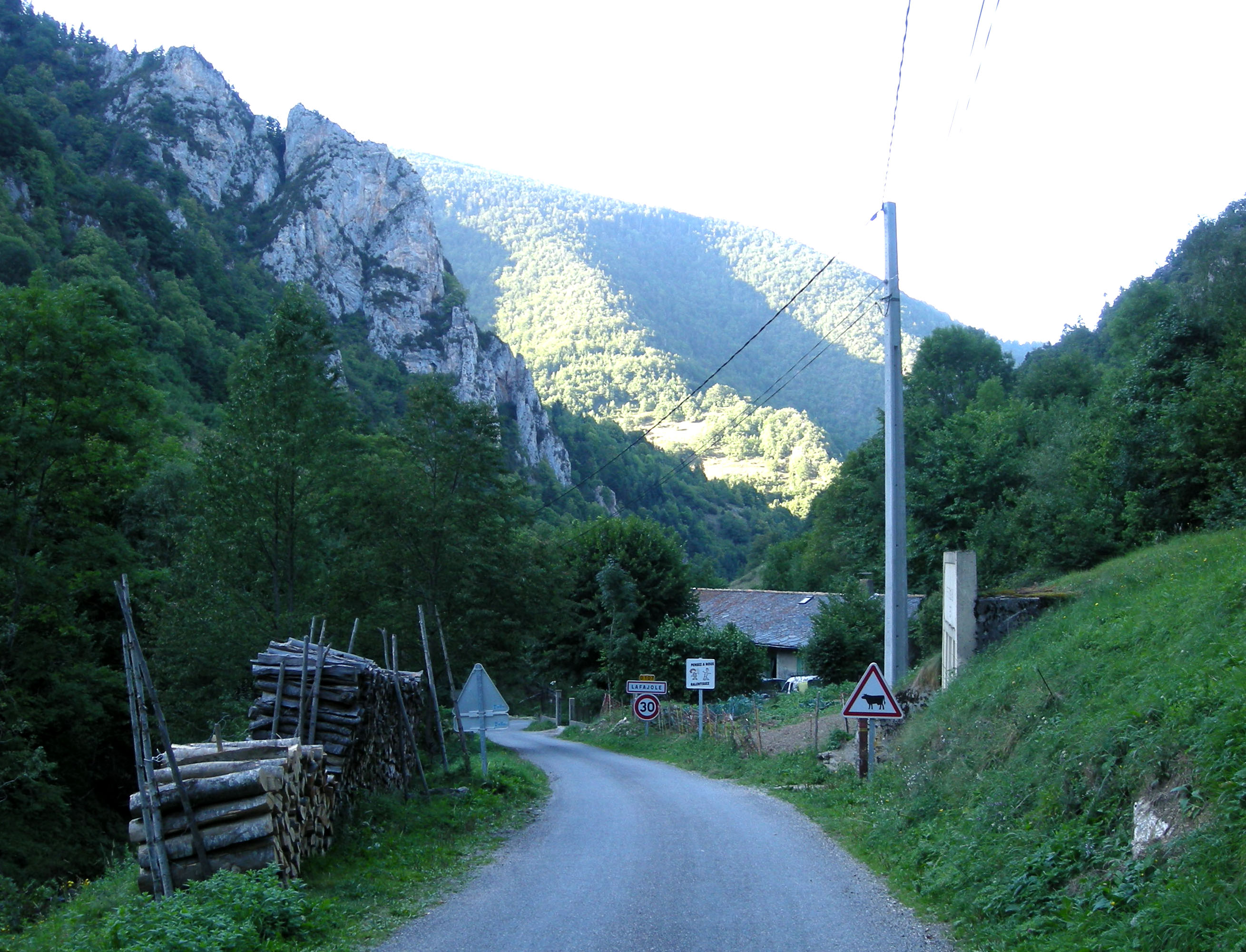
- The road into La Fajolle

- Coat of arms
- Location of La Fajolle
- Location within France Location within Occitanie
- Coordinates: 42°46′17″N 1°57′54″E
- Country: France
- Region: Occitania
- Department: Aude
- Arrondissement: Limoux
- Canton: La Haute-Vallée de l'Aude
- Intercommunality: Pyrénées Audoises

Government
  - Mayor (2020–2026): Marc San Francisco
- Area^{1}: 15.79 km^{2} (6.10 sq mi)
- Elevation: 1,100 m (3,600 ft)
- Highest elevation: 2,059 m (6,755 ft)
- Lowest elevation: 1,069 m (3,507 ft)
- Population (2023): 13
  - Density: 0.82/km^{2} (2.1/sq mi)
- Time zone: UTC+01:00 (CET)
  - Summer (DST): UTC+02:00 (CEST)
- INSEE/Postal code: 11135 /11140
- ^{1} French Land Register data, which excludes lakes, ponds, glaciers > 1 km^{2} (0.386 sq mi or 247 acres) and river estuaries.

La Fajolle (French pronunciation: [la faʒɔl]; Occitan: La Fajòla) is a commune in the Aude department in southern France.

== Population ==
Historical population
Year	Pop.	±% p.a.
1968	48	—
1975	29	−6.95%
1982	20	−5.17%
1990	12	−6.19%
1999	10	−2.01%
2007	14	+4.30%
2012	12	−3.04%
2017	11	−1.73%
2023	13	+2.82%
Source: INSEE

== See also ==
- Communes of the Aude department
