= Roquefort-de-Sault =

Commune in Occitanie, France

- Commune
- Coat of arms
- Location of Roquefort-de-Sault
- Location within France Location within Occitanie
- Coordinates: 42°44′20″N 2°12′06″E
- Country: France
- Region: Occitania
- Department: Aude
- Arrondissement: Limoux
- Canton: La Haute-Vallée de l'Aude
- Intercommunality: Pyrénées Audoises

Government
  - Mayor (2020–2026): Benoît Olive
- Area^{1}: 21.84 km^{2} (8.43 sq mi)
- Elevation: 1,000 m (3,300 ft)
- Highest elevation: 1,740 m (5,710 ft)
- Lowest elevation: 450 m (1,480 ft)
- Population (2023): 85
  - Density: 3.9/km^{2} (10/sq mi)
- Time zone: UTC+01:00 (CET)
  - Summer (DST): UTC+02:00 (CEST)
- INSEE/Postal code: 11321 /11140
- ^{1} French Land Register data, which excludes lakes, ponds, glaciers > 1 km^{2} (0.386 sq mi or 247 acres) and river estuaries.

Roquefort-de-Sault (French pronunciation: [ʁɔkfɔʁ də so]; Occitan: Ròcafòrt de Saut) is a commune in the Aude department in southern France.

== Population ==
Historical population
Year	Pop.	±% p.a.
1968	142	—
1975	122	−2.15%
1982	122	+0.00%
1990	118	−0.42%
1999	113	−0.48%
2007	103	−1.15%
2012	80	−4.93%
2017	84	+0.98%
2023	85	+0.20%
Source: INSEE

== See also ==
- Communes of the Aude department
