= Terroles =

Commune in Occitanie, France

- Commune
- Coat of arms
- Location of Terroles
- Location within France Location within Occitanie
- Coordinates: 42°59′10″N 2°20′21″E
- Country: France
- Region: Occitania
- Department: Aude
- Arrondissement: Limoux
- Canton: La Haute-Vallée de l'Aude

Government
  - Mayor (2020–2026): Pierre-André Planel
- Area^{1}: 6.63 km^{2} (2.56 sq mi)
- Elevation: 550 m (1,800 ft)
- Highest elevation: 767 m (2,516 ft)
- Lowest elevation: 480 m (1,570 ft)
- Population (2023): 14
  - Density: 2.1/km^{2} (5.5/sq mi)
- Time zone: UTC+01:00 (CET)
  - Summer (DST): UTC+02:00 (CEST)
- INSEE/Postal code: 11389 /11580
- ^{1} French Land Register data, which excludes lakes, ponds, glaciers > 1 km^{2} (0.386 sq mi or 247 acres) and river estuaries.

Terroles (French pronunciation: [tɛʁɔl]; Occitan: Terròlas) is a commune in the Aude department in southern France.

== Population ==
Historical population
Year	Pop.	±% p.a.
1968	34	—
1975	23	−5.43%
1982	31	+4.36%
1990	22	−4.20%
1999	15	−4.17%
2007	16	+0.81%
2012	13	−4.07%
2017	17	+5.51%
2023	14	−3.18%
Source: INSEE

== See also ==
- Communes of the Aude department
