= Joucou =

Commune in Occitanie, France

- Commune
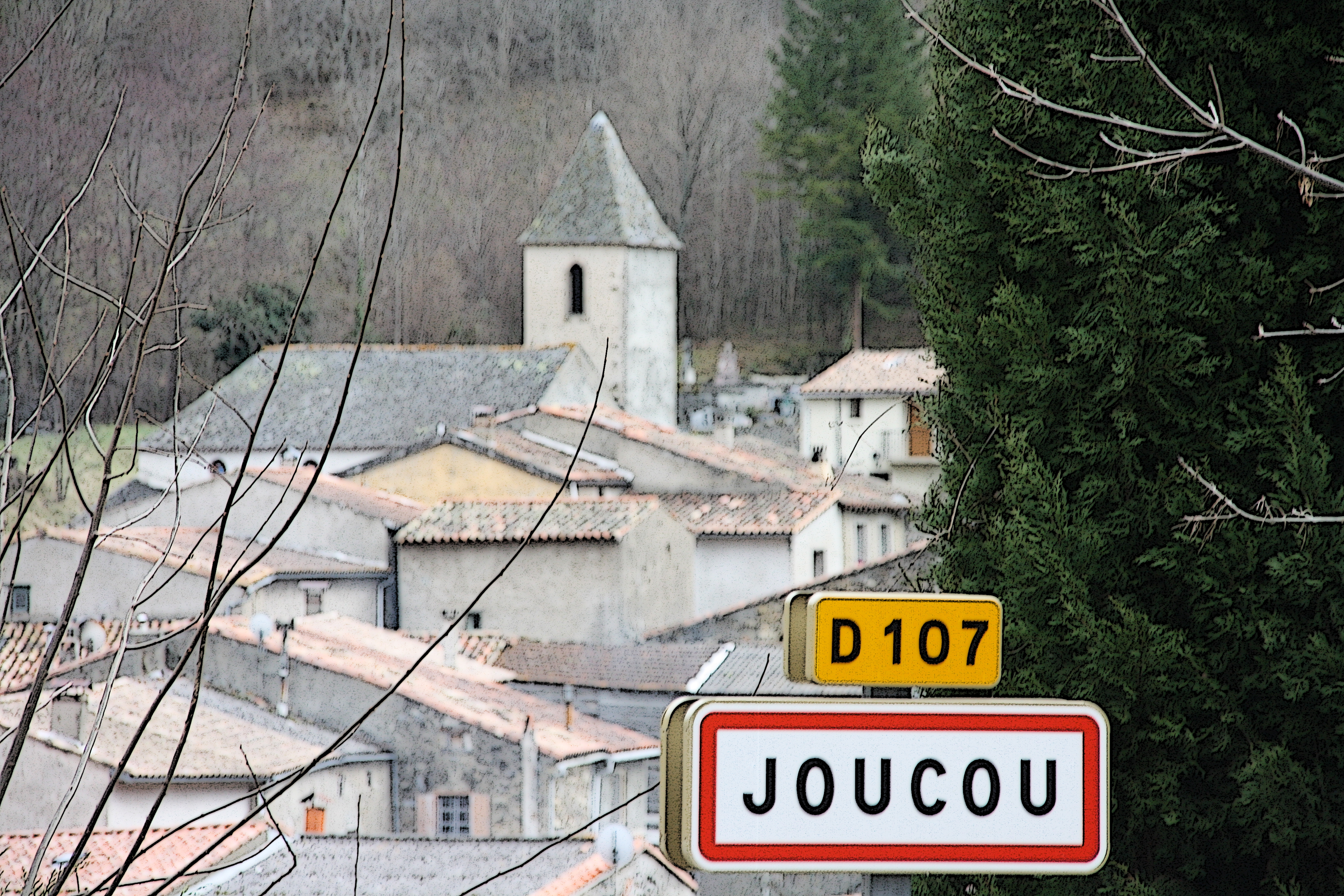
- A general view of Joucou

- Coat of arms
- Location of Joucou
- Location within France Location within Occitanie
- Coordinates: 42°49′38″N 2°05′20″E
- Country: France
- Region: Occitania
- Department: Aude
- Arrondissement: Limoux
- Canton: La Haute-Vallée de l'Aude

Government
  - Mayor (2020–2026): Lydie Munier
- Area^{1}: 6.44 km^{2} (2.49 sq mi)
- Elevation: 592 m (1,942 ft)
- Highest elevation: 1,067 m (3,501 ft)
- Lowest elevation: 544 m (1,785 ft)
- Population (2023): 30
  - Density: 4.7/km^{2} (12/sq mi)
- Time zone: UTC+01:00 (CET)
  - Summer (DST): UTC+02:00 (CEST)
- INSEE/Postal code: 11177 /11140
- ^{1} French Land Register data, which excludes lakes, ponds, glaciers > 1 km^{2} (0.386 sq mi or 247 acres) and river estuaries.

Joucou (French pronunciation: [ʒuku]; Occitan: Jocon) is a commune in the Aude department in southern France.

== Population ==
Historical population
Year	Pop.	±% p.a.
1968	48	—
1975	33	−5.21%
1982	25	−3.89%
1990	25	+0.00%
1999	27	+0.86%
2007	33	+2.54%
2012	36	+1.76%
2017	35	−0.56%
2023	30	−2.54%
Source: INSEE

== See also ==
- Communes of the Aude department
