= Coudons =

Commune in Occitanie, France

- Commune
- Coat of arms
- Location of Coudons
- Location within France Location within Occitanie
- Coordinates: 42°51′50″N 2°07′34″E
- Country: France
- Region: Occitania
- Department: Aude
- Arrondissement: Limoux
- Canton: La Haute-Vallée de l'Aude

Government
  - Mayor (2020–2026): Jacky Ondedieu
- Area^{1}: 9.5 km^{2} (3.7 sq mi)
- Elevation: 900 m (3,000 ft)
- Highest elevation: 1,271 m (4,170 ft)
- Lowest elevation: 779 m (2,556 ft)
- Population (2023): 54
  - Density: 5.7/km^{2} (15/sq mi)
- Time zone: UTC+01:00 (CET)
  - Summer (DST): UTC+02:00 (CEST)
- INSEE/Postal code: 11101 /11500
- ^{1} French Land Register data, which excludes lakes, ponds, glaciers > 1 km^{2} (0.386 sq mi or 247 acres) and river estuaries.

Coudons (French: [kudɔ̃]; Occitan: Codons) is a commune in the Aude department in southern France.

== Population ==
Historical population
Year	Pop.	±% p.a.
1968	83	—
1975	84	+0.17%
1982	81	−0.52%
1990	79	−0.31%
1999	62	−2.66%
2007	52	−2.17%
2012	46	−2.42%
2017	52	+2.48%
2023	54	+0.63%
Source: INSEE

== See also ==
- Communes of the Aude department
