= Campagna-de-Sault =

Commune in Occitanie, France

- Commune
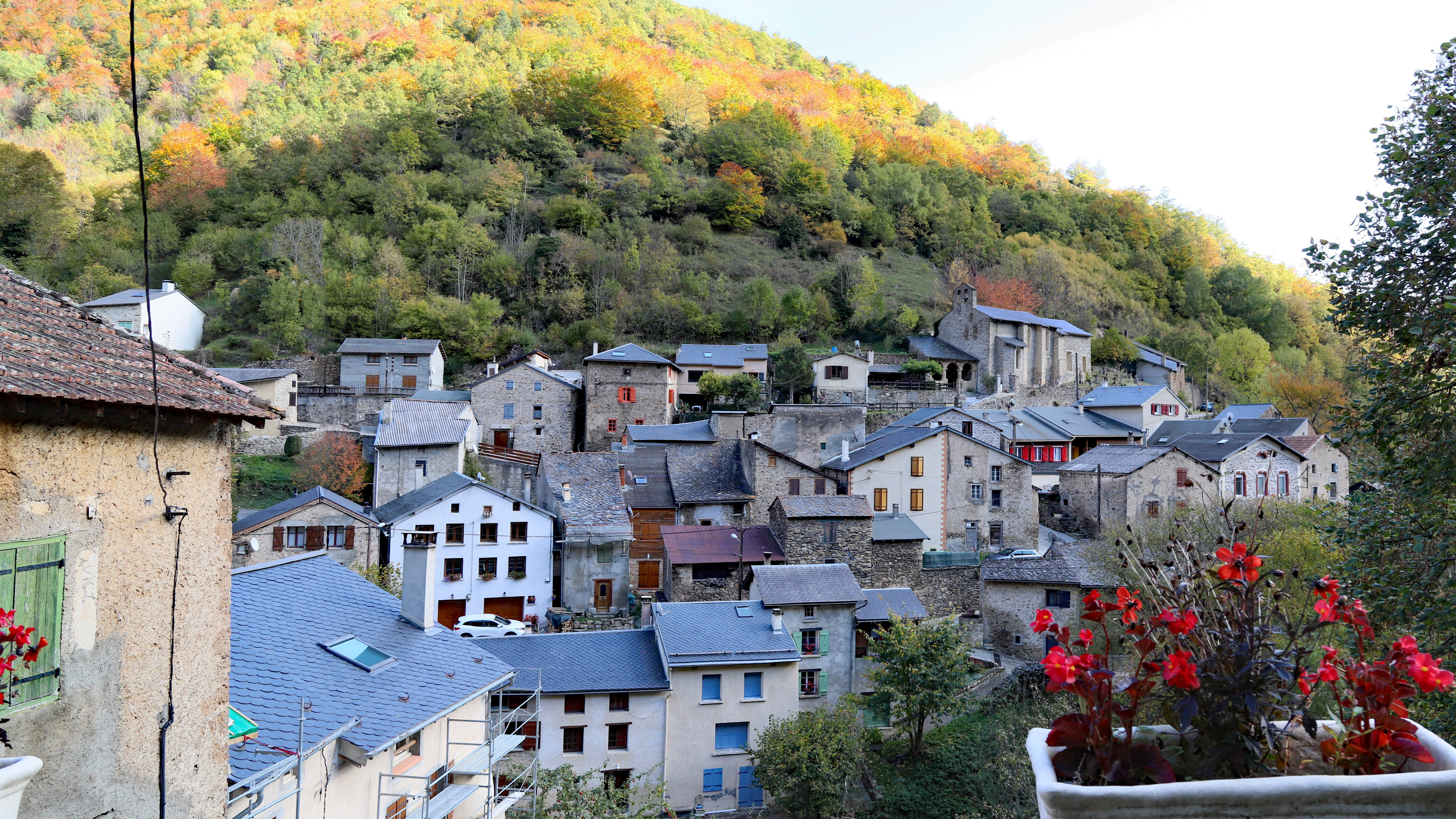
- The general view of Campagna-de-Sault

- Coat of arms
- Location of Campagna-de-Sault
- Location within France Location within Occitanie
- Coordinates: 42°45′37″N 2°03′17″E
- Country: France
- Region: Occitania
- Department: Aude
- Arrondissement: Limoux
- Canton: La Haute-Vallée de l'Aude

Government
  - Mayor (2020–2026): Didier Montagne
- Area^{1}: 10.4 km^{2} (4.0 sq mi)
- Elevation: 900 m (3,000 ft)
- Highest elevation: 1,965 m (6,447 ft)
- Lowest elevation: 735 m (2,411 ft)
- Population (2023): 20
  - Density: 1.9/km^{2} (5.0/sq mi)
- Time zone: UTC+01:00 (CET)
  - Summer (DST): UTC+02:00 (CEST)
- INSEE/Postal code: 11062 /11140
- ^{1} French Land Register data, which excludes lakes, ponds, glaciers > 1 km^{2} (0.386 sq mi or 247 acres) and river estuaries.

Campagna-de-Sault (French pronunciation: [kɑ̃paɲa də so]; Occitan: Campanha de Saut) is a commune in the Aude department in southern France.

== Population ==
Historical population
| Year | Pop. | ±% p.a. |
|---|---|---|
| 1968 | 11 | — |
| 1975 | 9 | −2.83% |
| 1982 | 10 | +1.52% |
| 1990 | 12 | +2.31% |
| 1999 | 15 | +2.51% |
| 2007 | 17 | +1.58% |
| 2012 | 14 | −3.81% |
| 2017 | 19 | +6.30% |
| 2023 | 20 | +0.86% |
Source: INSEE

== See also ==
- Communes of the Aude department
