= Mérial =

Commune in Occitanie, France

- Commune
- Coat of arms
- Location of Mérial
- Location within France Location within Occitanie
- Coordinates: 42°47′18″N 1°58′47″E
- Country: France
- Region: Occitania
- Department: Aude
- Arrondissement: Limoux
- Canton: La Haute-Vallée de l'Aude

Government
  - Mayor (2020–2026): Patrick Muratorio
- Area^{1}: 17.19 km^{2} (6.64 sq mi)
- Elevation: 900 m (3,000 ft)
- Highest elevation: 2,027 m (6,650 ft)
- Lowest elevation: 880 m (2,890 ft)
- Population (2023): 28
  - Density: 1.6/km^{2} (4.2/sq mi)
- Time zone: UTC+01:00 (CET)
  - Summer (DST): UTC+02:00 (CEST)
- INSEE/Postal code: 11230 /11140
- ^{1} French Land Register data, which excludes lakes, ponds, glaciers > 1 km^{2} (0.386 sq mi or 247 acres) and river estuaries.

Mérial (French pronunciation: [meʁjal]; Occitan: Merial) is a commune in the Aude department in southern France.

== Population ==
Historical population
Year	Pop.	±% p.a.
1968	44	—
1975	34	−3.62%
1982	30	−1.77%
1990	26	−1.77%
1999	21	−2.35%
2007	25	+2.20%
2012	28	+2.29%
2017	31	+2.06%
2023	28	−1.68%
Source: INSEE

== See also ==
- Communes of the Aude department
