= Sonnac-sur-l'Hers =

Commune in Occitanie, France

- Commune
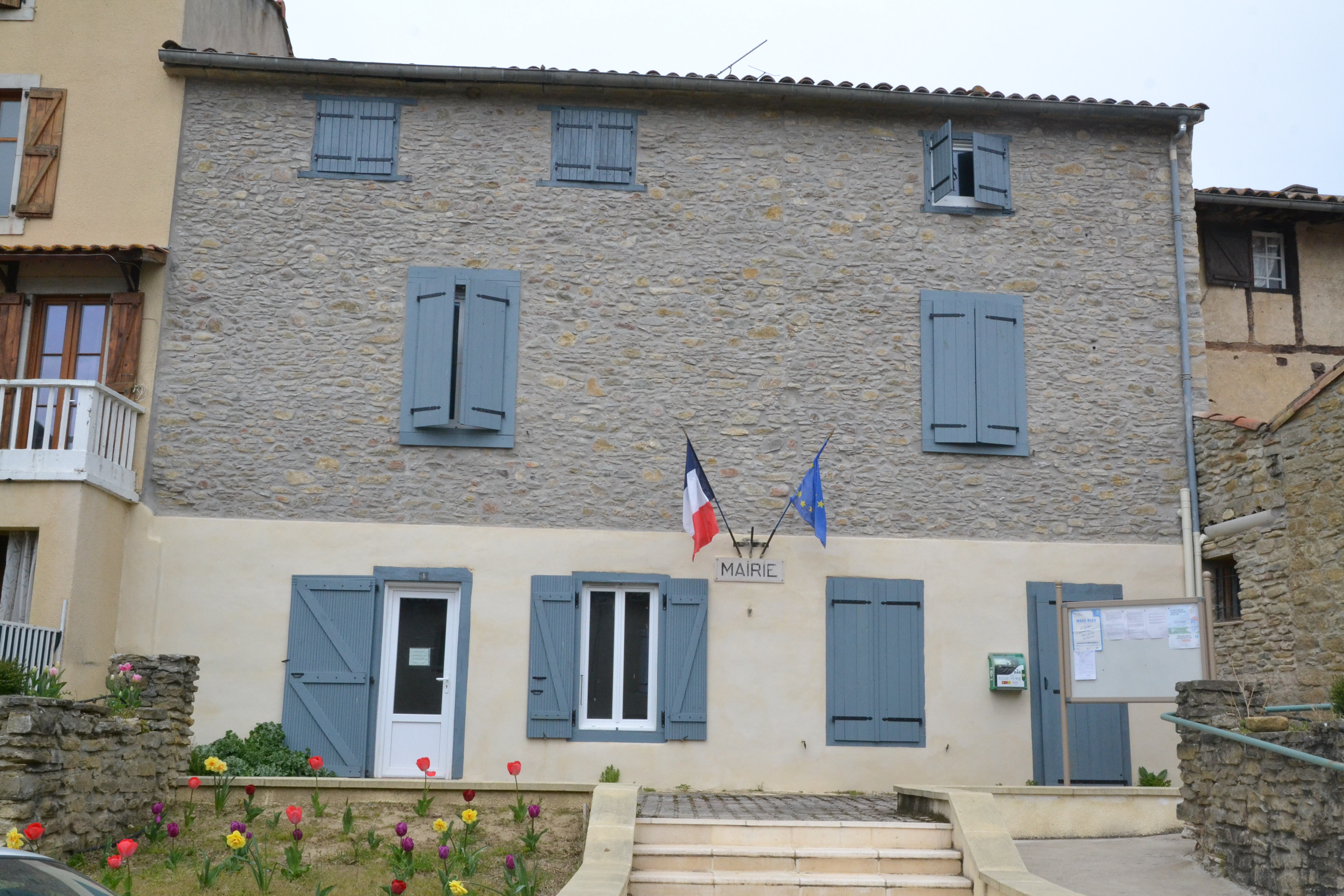
- The town hall in Sonnac-sur-l'Hers
- Location of Sonnac-sur-l'Hers
- Location within France Location within Occitanie
- Coordinates: 43°00′17″N 1°59′38″E
- Country: France
- Region: Occitania
- Department: Aude
- Arrondissement: Limoux
- Canton: La Haute-Vallée de l'Aude

Government
  - Mayor (2024–2026): Julien Saddier
- Area^{1}: 13.74 km^{2} (5.31 sq mi)
- Elevation: 362 m (1,188 ft)
- Highest elevation: 570 m (1,870 ft)
- Lowest elevation: 344 m (1,129 ft)
- Population (2023): 137
  - Density: 9.97/km^{2} (25.8/sq mi)
- Time zone: UTC+01:00 (CET)
  - Summer (DST): UTC+02:00 (CEST)
- INSEE/Postal code: 11380 /11230
- ^{1} French Land Register data, which excludes lakes, ponds, glaciers > 1 km^{2} (0.386 sq mi or 247 acres) and river estuaries.

Sonnac-sur-l'Hers (French pronunciation: [sɔnak syʁ lɛʁs], literally Sonnac on the Hers; Occitan: Sonac) is a commune in the Aude department in southern France.

== Population ==
Historical population
Year	Pop.	±% p.a.
1968	135	—
1975	117	−2.02%
1982	108	−1.14%
1990	114	+0.68%
1999	128	+1.30%
2007	156	+2.50%
2012	162	+0.76%
2017	135	−3.58%
2023	137	+0.25%
Source: INSEE

== See also ==
- Communes of the Aude department
