= Montjardin =

Commune in Occitanie, France

- Commune
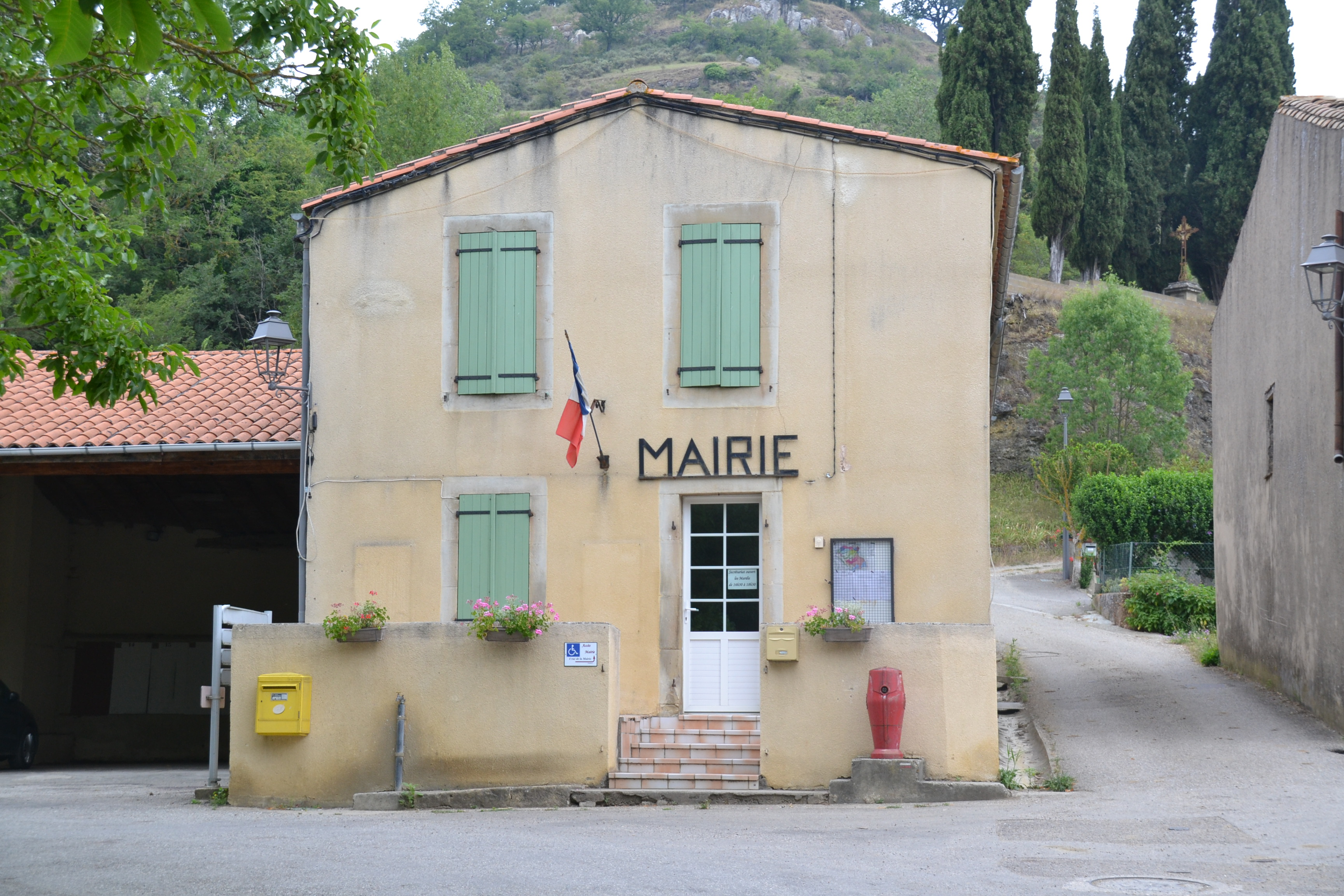
- Town hall
- Location of Montjardin
- Location within France Location within Occitanie
- Coordinates: 42°59′01″N 2°01′42″E
- Country: France
- Region: Occitania
- Department: Aude
- Arrondissement: Limoux
- Canton: La Haute-Vallée de l'Aude

Government
  - Mayor (2022–2026): Bertrand Bargain
- Area^{1}: 14.11 km^{2} (5.45 sq mi)
- Elevation: 380 m (1,250 ft)
- Highest elevation: 763 m (2,503 ft)
- Lowest elevation: 388 m (1,273 ft)
- Population (2023): 93
  - Density: 6.6/km^{2} (17/sq mi)
- Time zone: UTC+01:00 (CET)
  - Summer (DST): UTC+02:00 (CEST)
- INSEE/Postal code: 11249 /11230
- ^{1} French Land Register data, which excludes lakes, ponds, glaciers > 1 km^{2} (0.386 sq mi or 247 acres) and river estuaries.

Montjardin (French pronunciation: [mɔ̃ʒaʁdɛ̃]) is a commune in the Aude department in southern France. Historically jet was mined in this area.

== Population ==
Historical population
Year	Pop.	±% p.a.
1968	77	—
1975	63	−2.83%
1982	94	+5.88%
1990	115	+2.55%
1999	110	−0.49%
2007	105	−0.58%
2012	95	−1.98%
2017	87	−1.74%
2023	93	+1.12%
Source: INSEE

== See also ==
- Communes of the Aude department
