= Saint-Just-et-le-Bézu =

Commune in Occitanie, France

- Commune
- Coat of arms
- Location of Saint-Just-et-le-Bézu
- Location within France Location within Occitanie
- Coordinates: 42°52′50″N 2°16′06″E
- Country: France
- Region: Occitania
- Department: Aude
- Arrondissement: Limoux
- Canton: La Haute-Vallée de l'Aude

Government
  - Mayor (2020–2026): Louis Sire
- Area^{1}: 13.54 km^{2} (5.23 sq mi)
- Elevation: 540 m (1,770 ft)
- Highest elevation: 1,010 m (3,310 ft)
- Lowest elevation: 417 m (1,368 ft)
- Population (2023): 50
  - Density: 3.7/km^{2} (9.6/sq mi)
- Time zone: UTC+01:00 (CET)
  - Summer (DST): UTC+02:00 (CEST)
- INSEE/Postal code: 11350 /11500
- ^{1} French Land Register data, which excludes lakes, ponds, glaciers > 1 km^{2} (0.386 sq mi or 247 acres) and river estuaries.

Saint-Just-et-le-Bézu (French pronunciation: [sɛ̃ ʒyst e lə bezy]; Languedocien: Sant Just del Besun) is a commune in the Aude department in southern France.

== Population ==
Historical population
Year	Pop.	±% p.a.
1968	53	—
1975	44	−2.62%
1982	55	+3.24%
1990	54	−0.23%
1999	62	+1.55%
2007	66	+0.78%
2012	58	−2.55%
2017	44	−5.38%
2023	50	+2.15%
Source: INSEE

== See also ==
- Communes of the Aude department
