= Sainte-Colombe-sur-Guette =

Commune in Occitanie, France

- Commune
- Coat of arms
- Location of Sainte-Colombe-sur-Guette
- Location within France Location within Occitanie
- Coordinates: 42°45′03″N 2°14′07″E
- Country: France
- Region: Occitania
- Department: Aude
- Arrondissement: Limoux
- Canton: La Haute-Vallée de l'Aude
- Intercommunality: Pyrénées Audoises

Government
  - Mayor (2020–2026): Anthony Sanchez
- Area^{1}: 21.04 km^{2} (8.12 sq mi)
- Elevation: 600 m (2,000 ft)
- Highest elevation: 1,832 m (6,010 ft)
- Lowest elevation: 440 m (1,440 ft)
- Population (2023): 38
  - Density: 1.8/km^{2} (4.7/sq mi)
- Time zone: UTC+01:00 (CET)
  - Summer (DST): UTC+02:00 (CEST)
- INSEE/Postal code: 11335 /11140
- ^{1} French Land Register data, which excludes lakes, ponds, glaciers > 1 km^{2} (0.386 sq mi or 247 acres) and river estuaries.

Sainte-Colombe-sur-Guette (Languedocien: Santa Colomba or Santa Colomba de Ròcafòrt) is a commune in the Aude department in southern France.

== Population ==
Historical population
Year	Pop.	±% p.a.
1968	86	—
1975	70	−2.90%
1982	64	−1.27%
1990	58	−1.22%
1999	57	−0.19%
2007	46	−2.64%
2012	51	+2.09%
2017	46	−2.04%
2023	38	−3.13%
Source: INSEE

== See also ==
- Communes of the Aude department
