= La Serpent =

Commune in Occitanie, France

- Commune
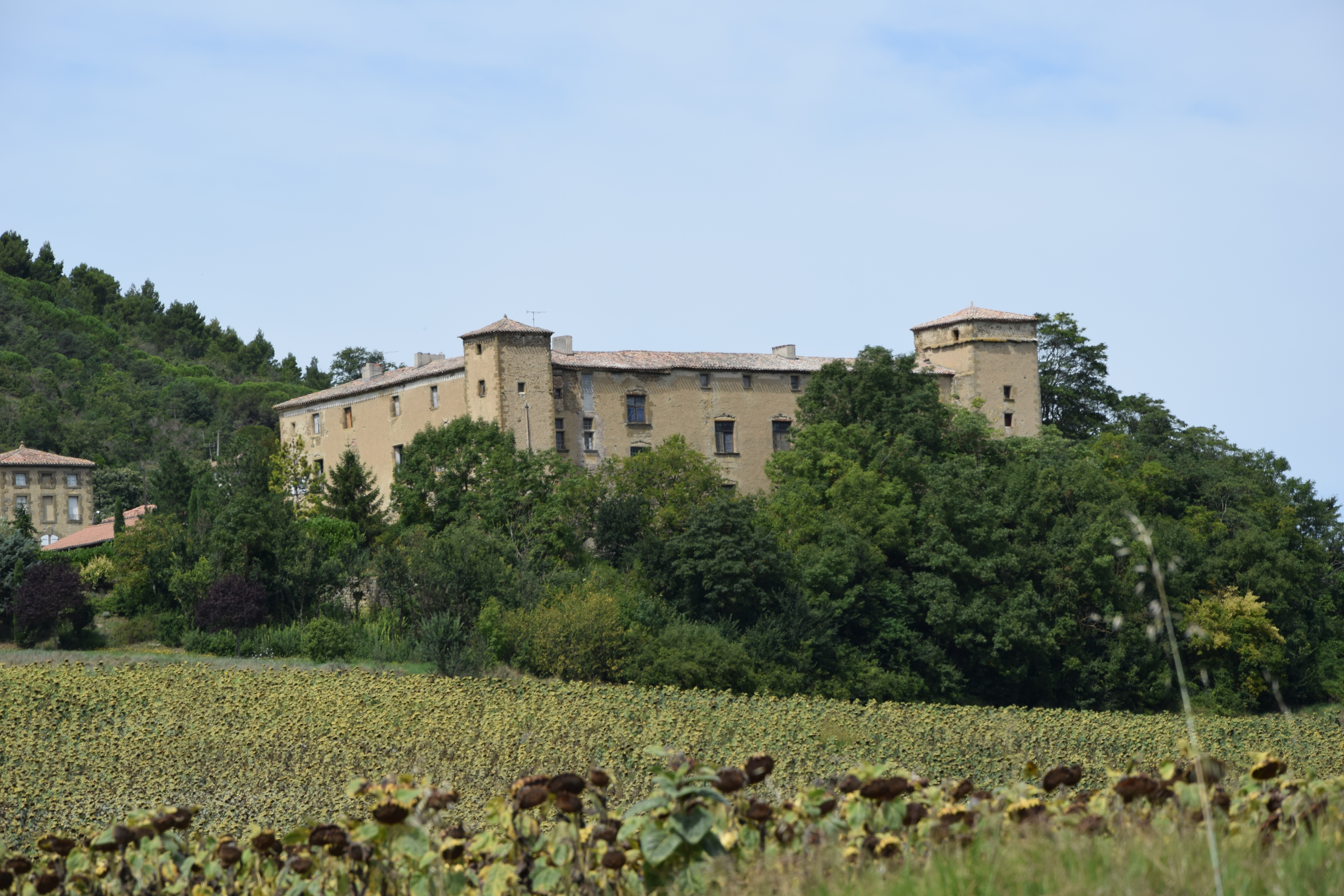
- The chateau in La Serpent

- Coat of arms
- Location of La Serpent
- Location within France Location within Occitanie
- Coordinates: 42°58′05″N 2°11′00″E
- Country: France
- Region: Occitania
- Department: Aude
- Arrondissement: Limoux
- Canton: La Haute-Vallée de l'Aude

Government
  - Mayor (2020–2026): Rémy Tisseyre
- Area^{1}: 9.59 km^{2} (3.70 sq mi)
- Elevation: 350 m (1,150 ft)
- Highest elevation: 568 m (1,864 ft)
- Lowest elevation: 309 m (1,014 ft)
- Population (2023): 92
  - Density: 9.6/km^{2} (25/sq mi)
- Time zone: UTC+01:00 (CET)
  - Summer (DST): UTC+02:00 (CEST)
- INSEE/Postal code: 11376 /11190
- ^{1} French Land Register data, which excludes lakes, ponds, glaciers > 1 km^{2} (0.386 sq mi or 247 acres) and river estuaries.

La Serpent (Occitan: Lo Serp) is a commune in the Aude department in southern France.

== Population ==
Historical population
Year	Pop.	±% p.a.
1968	106	—
1975	95	−1.55%
1982	91	−0.61%
1990	85	−0.85%
1999	77	−1.09%
2007	74	−0.50%
2012	80	+1.57%
2017	92	+2.83%
2023	92	+0.00%
Source: INSEE

== See also ==
- Communes of the Aude department
