= Peyrefitte-du-Razès =

Commune in Occitanie, France

- Commune
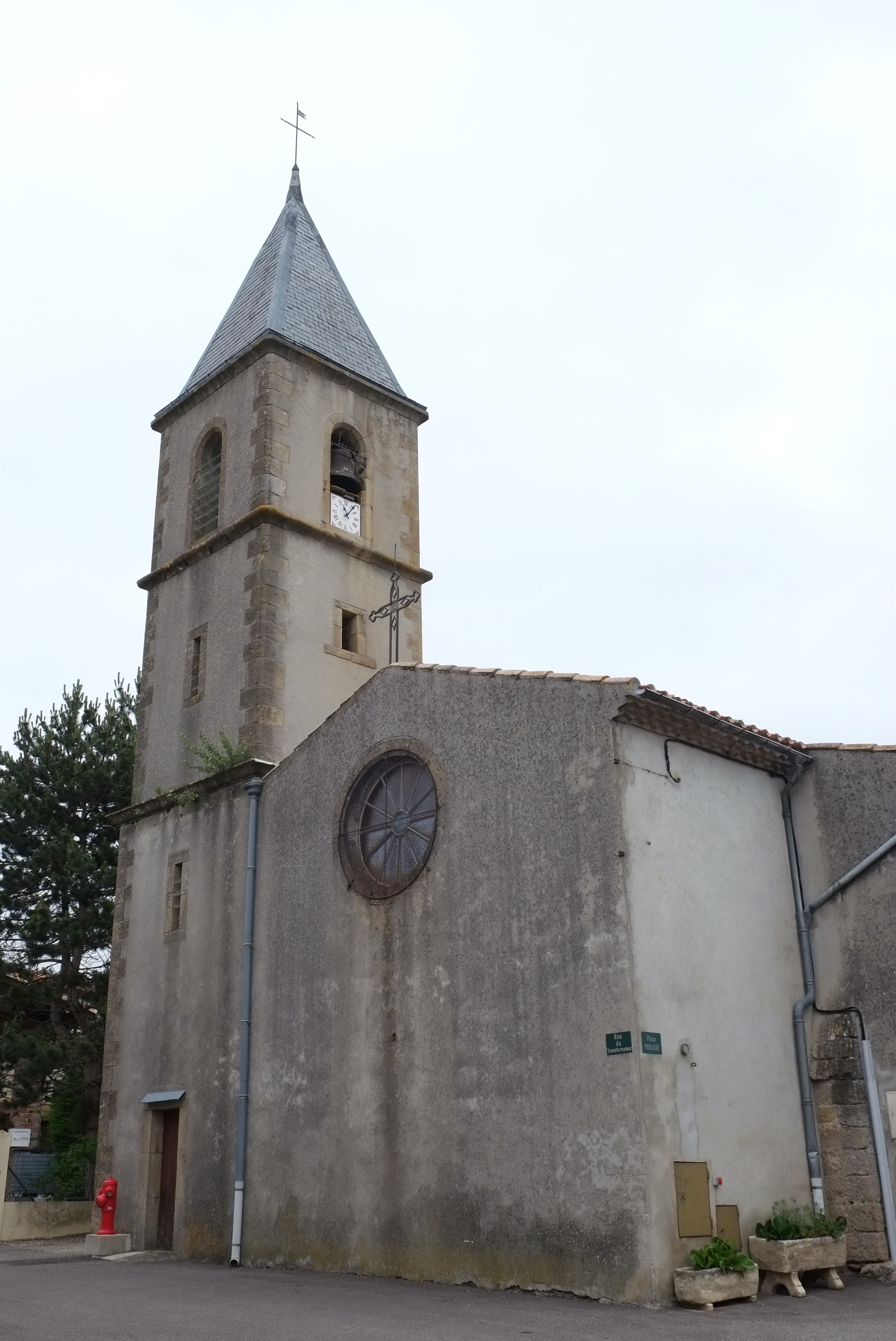
- The church in Peyrefitte-du-Razès

- Coat of arms
- Location of Peyrefitte-du-Razès
- Location within France Location within Occitanie
- Coordinates: 43°03′42″N 2°01′26″E
- Country: France
- Region: Occitania
- Department: Aude
- Arrondissement: Limoux
- Canton: La Haute-Vallée de l'Aude

Government
  - Mayor (2020–2026): Jean-Paul Martinez
- Area^{1}: 6.72 km^{2} (2.59 sq mi)
- Elevation: 373 m (1,224 ft)
- Highest elevation: 551 m (1,808 ft)
- Lowest elevation: 360 m (1,180 ft)
- Population (2023): 54
  - Density: 8.0/km^{2} (21/sq mi)
- Time zone: UTC+01:00 (CET)
  - Summer (DST): UTC+02:00 (CEST)
- INSEE/Postal code: 11282 /11230
- ^{1} French Land Register data, which excludes lakes, ponds, glaciers > 1 km^{2} (0.386 sq mi or 247 acres) and river estuaries.

Peyrefitte-du-Razès (French pronunciation: [pɛʁfit dy ʁazɛs]; Occitan: Pèirafita de Rasés) is a commune in the Aude department in southern France.

== Population ==
Historical population
Year	Pop.	±% p.a.
1968	77	—
1975	59	−3.73%
1982	46	−3.49%
1990	44	−0.55%
1999	37	−1.91%
2007	48	+3.31%
2012	43	−2.18%
2017	48	+2.22%
2023	54	+1.98%
Source: INSEE

== See also ==
- Communes of the Aude department
