= Montauriol =

Montauriol can refer to one of the following communes in France:

- Montauriol, Aude, in the Aude department
- Montauriol, Lot-et-Garonne, in the Lot-et-Garonne department
- Montauriol, Pyrénées-Orientales, in the Pyrénées-Orientales department
- Montauriol, Tarn, in the Tarn department
