= Orsans =

Orsans may refer to the following places in France:

- Orsans, Aude, a commune in the department of Aude
- Orsans, Doubs, a commune in the department of Doubs
