= Lafage =

Commune in Occitanie, France

- Commune
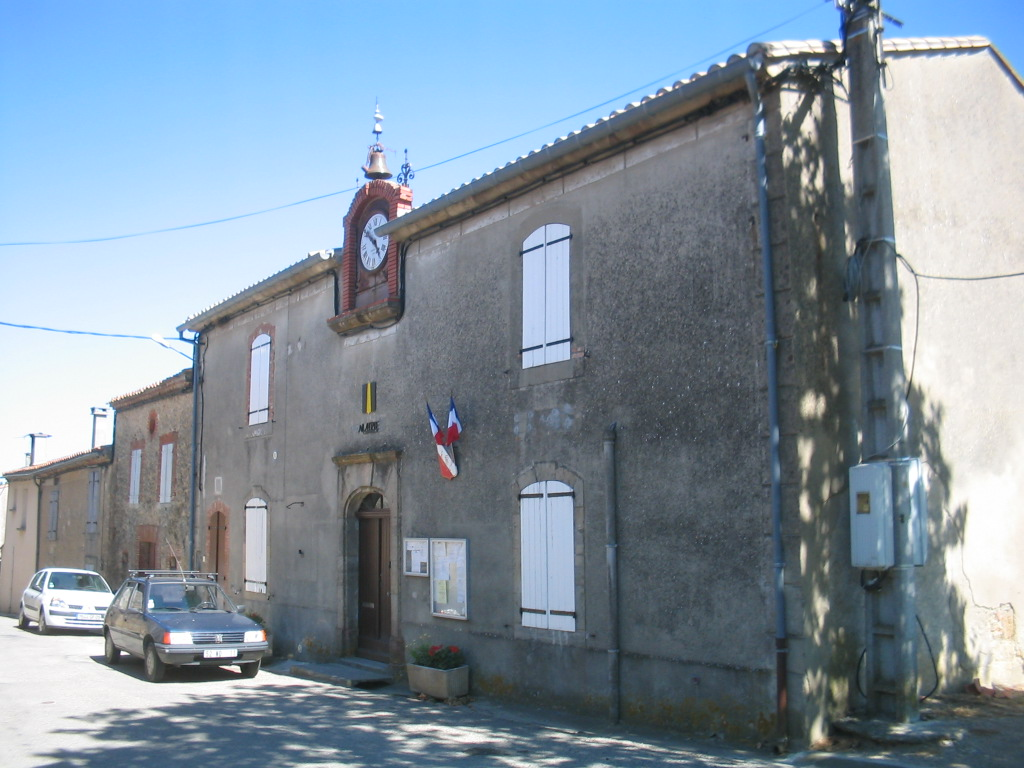
- The former town hall in Lafage

- Coat of arms
- Location of Lafage
- Location within France Location within Occitanie
- Coordinates: 43°10′31″N 1°51′50″E
- Country: France
- Region: Occitania
- Department: Aude
- Arrondissement: Carcassonne
- Canton: La Piège au Razès

Government
  - Mayor (2020–2026): Jean-Baptiste Sarda
- Area^{1}: 12.71 km^{2} (4.91 sq mi)
- Elevation: 330 m (1,080 ft)
- Highest elevation: 455 m (1,493 ft)
- Lowest elevation: 265 m (869 ft)
- Population (2023): 90
  - Density: 7.1/km^{2} (18/sq mi)
- Time zone: UTC+01:00 (CET)
  - Summer (DST): UTC+02:00 (CEST)
- INSEE/Postal code: 11184 /11420
- ^{1} French Land Register data, which excludes lakes, ponds, glaciers > 1 km^{2} (0.386 sq mi or 247 acres) and river estuaries.

Lafage (French pronunciation: [lafaʒ]; Occitan: La Faja) is a commune in the Aude department in southern France.

== Population ==
Historical population
Year	Pop.	±% p.a.
1968	112	—
1975	95	−2.32%
1982	103	+1.16%
1990	65	−5.59%
1999	98	+4.67%
2007	88	−1.34%
2012	96	+1.76%
2017	89	−1.50%
2023	90	+0.19%
Source: INSEE

== See also ==
- Communes of the Aude department
