= Saint-Julien-de-Briola =

Commune in Occitanie, France

- Commune
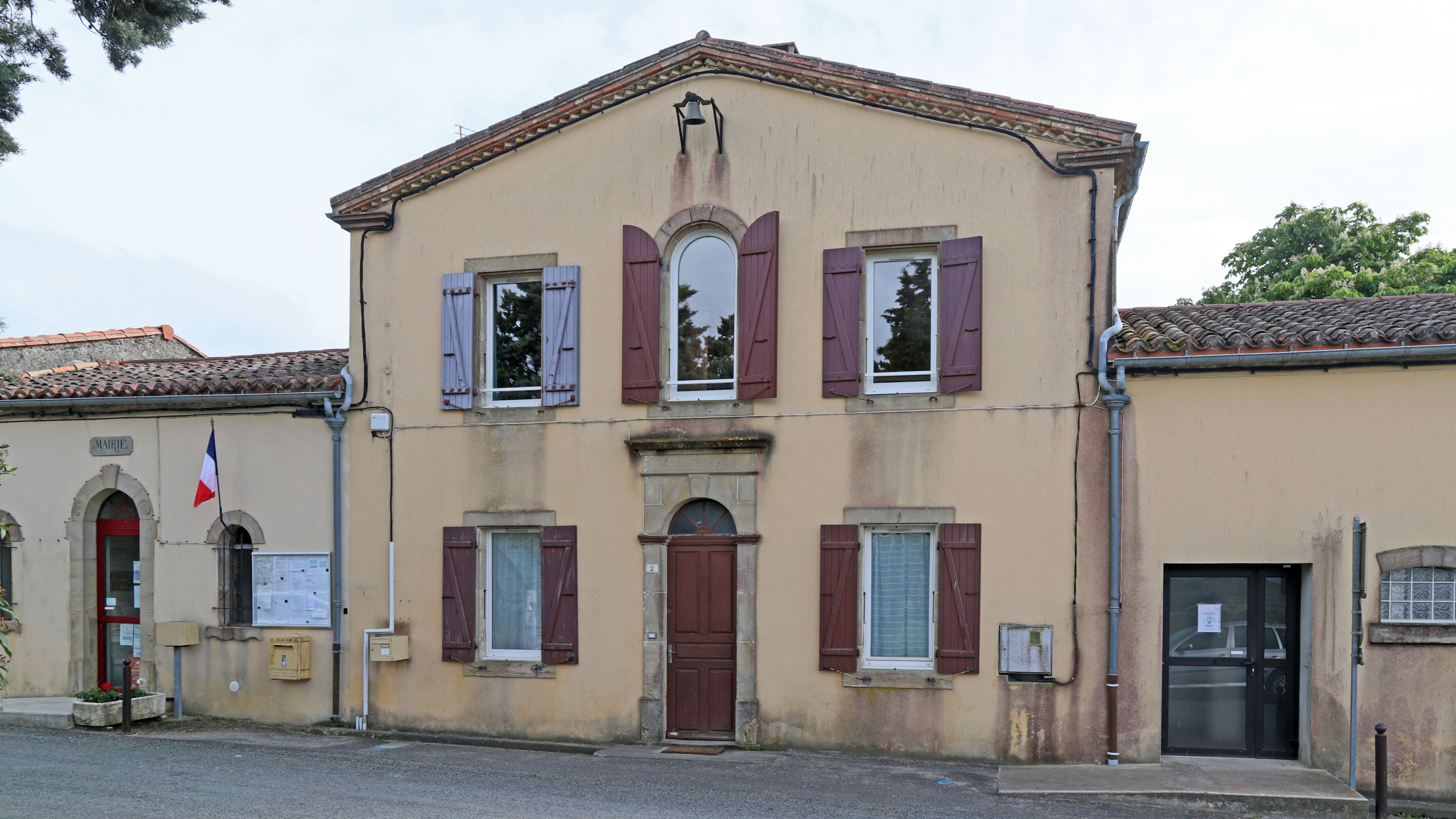
- Town hall

- Coat of arms
- Location of Saint-Julien-de-Briola
- Location within France Location within Occitanie
- Coordinates: 43°09′37″N 1°56′37″E
- Country: France
- Region: Occitania
- Department: Aude
- Arrondissement: Carcassonne
- Canton: La Piège au Razès

Government
  - Mayor (2020–2026): Bernard Delpoux
- Area^{1}: 11.31 km^{2} (4.37 sq mi)
- Elevation: 430 m (1,410 ft)
- Highest elevation: 402 m (1,319 ft)
- Lowest elevation: 294 m (965 ft)
- Population (2023): 79
  - Density: 7.0/km^{2} (18/sq mi)
- Time zone: UTC+01:00 (CET)
  - Summer (DST): UTC+02:00 (CEST)
- INSEE/Postal code: 11348 /11270
- ^{1} French Land Register data, which excludes lakes, ponds, glaciers > 1 km^{2} (0.386 sq mi or 247 acres) and river estuaries.

Saint-Julien-de-Briola (French pronunciation: [sɛ̃ ʒyljɛ̃ də bʁijɔla]; Languedocien: Sant Julian) is a commune in the Aude department in southern France.

== Population ==
Historical population
Year	Pop.	±% p.a.
1968	108	—
1975	72	−5.63%
1982	69	−0.61%
1990	79	+1.71%
1999	75	−0.58%
2007	85	+1.58%
2012	77	−1.96%
2017	89	+2.94%
2023	79	−1.97%
Source: INSEE

== See also ==
- Communes of the Aude department
