= Fajac-la-Relenque =

Commune in Occitanie, France

- Commune
- Coat of arms
- Location of Fajac-la-Relenque
- Location within France Location within Occitanie
- Coordinates: 43°16′51″N 1°43′30″E
- Country: France
- Region: Occitania
- Department: Aude
- Arrondissement: Carcassonne
- Canton: La Piège au Razès

Government
  - Mayor (2020–2026): Alain Bousquet
- Area^{1}: 3.51 km^{2} (1.36 sq mi)
- Elevation: 240 m (790 ft)
- Highest elevation: 332 m (1,089 ft)
- Lowest elevation: 218 m (715 ft)
- Population (2023): 48
  - Density: 14/km^{2} (35/sq mi)
- Time zone: UTC+01:00 (CET)
  - Summer (DST): UTC+02:00 (CEST)
- INSEE/Postal code: 11134 /11410
- ^{1} French Land Register data, which excludes lakes, ponds, glaciers > 1 km^{2} (0.386 sq mi or 247 acres) and river estuaries.

Fajac-la-Relenque (French pronunciation: [faʒak la ʁəlɛ̃k]; Occitan: Fajac de la Relenca) is a commune in the Aude department in southern France.

== Population ==
Historical population
Year	Pop.	±% p.a.
1968	75	—
1975	62	−2.68%
1982	51	−2.75%
1990	52	+0.24%
1999	42	−2.35%
2007	44	+0.58%
2012	49	+2.18%
2017	50	+0.40%
2023	48	−0.68%
Source: INSEE

== See also ==
- Communes of the Aude department
