= Montgradail =

Commune in Occitanie, France

- Commune
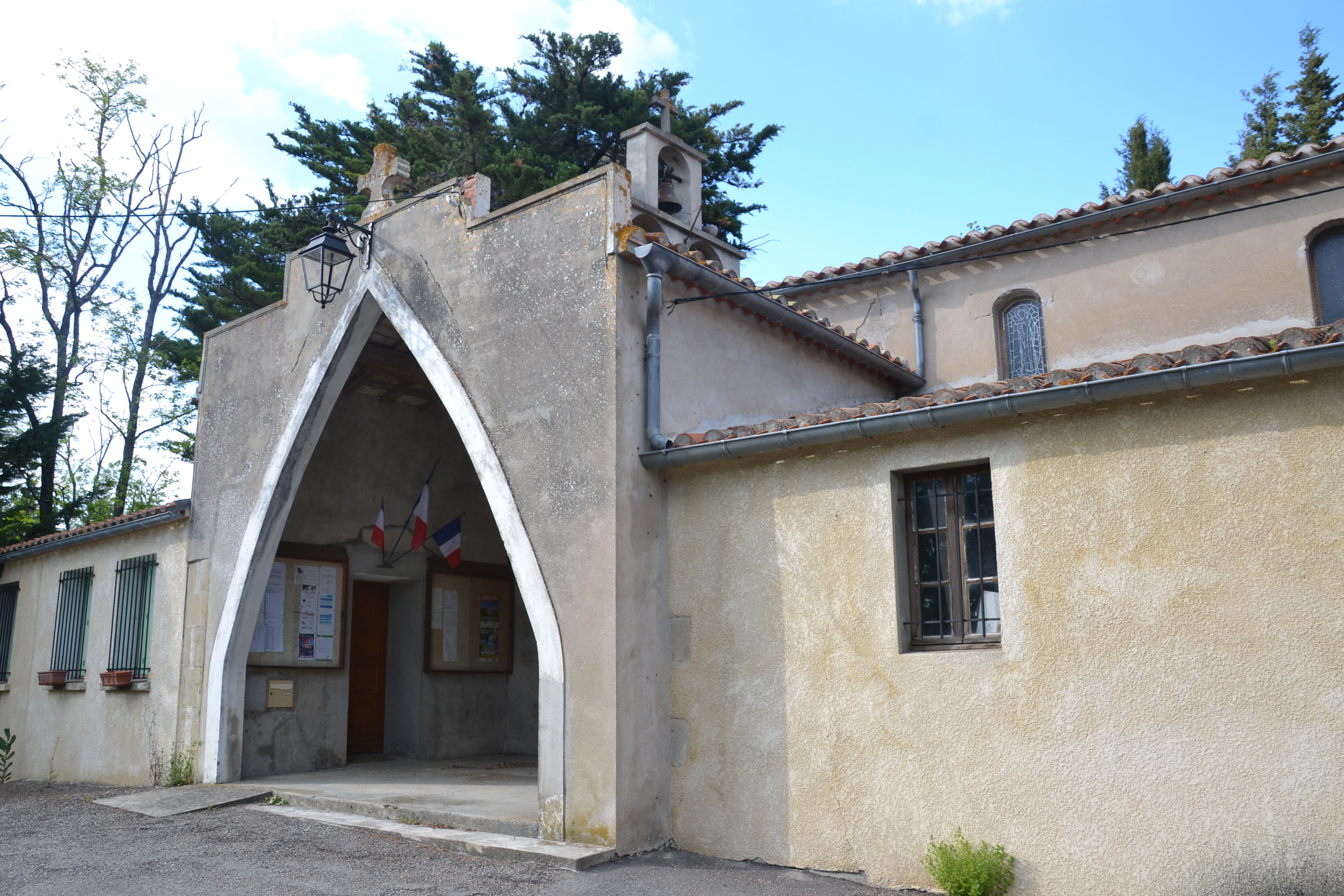
- Town hall

- Coat of arms
- Location of Montgradail
- Location within France Location within Occitanie
- Coordinates: 43°07′21″N 2°01′37″E
- Country: France
- Region: Occitania
- Department: Aude
- Arrondissement: Limoux
- Canton: La Piège au Razès

Government
  - Mayor (2020–2026): Sabine Jeannot
- Area^{1}: 4.48 km^{2} (1.73 sq mi)
- Elevation: 382 m (1,253 ft)
- Highest elevation: 333 m (1,093 ft)
- Lowest elevation: 249 m (817 ft)
- Population (2023): 50
  - Density: 11/km^{2} (29/sq mi)
- Time zone: UTC+01:00 (CET)
  - Summer (DST): UTC+02:00 (CEST)
- INSEE/Postal code: 11246 /11240
- ^{1} French Land Register data, which excludes lakes, ponds, glaciers > 1 km^{2} (0.386 sq mi or 247 acres) and river estuaries.

Montgradail (French pronunciation: [mɔ̃ɡʁadaj]; Occitan: Montgradalh) is a commune in the Aude department in southern France.

== Population ==
Historical population
Year	Pop.	±% p.a.
1968	76	—
1975	61	−3.09%
1982	60	−0.24%
1990	60	+0.00%
1999	65	+0.89%
2007	60	−1.00%
2012	60	+0.00%
2017	47	−4.77%
2023	50	+1.04%
Source: INSEE

== Places and monuments ==
On a house to the right of the church, there is a nice sundial dating back to 1685.

== See also ==
- Communes of the Aude department
