= Seignalens =

Commune in Occitanie, France

- Commune
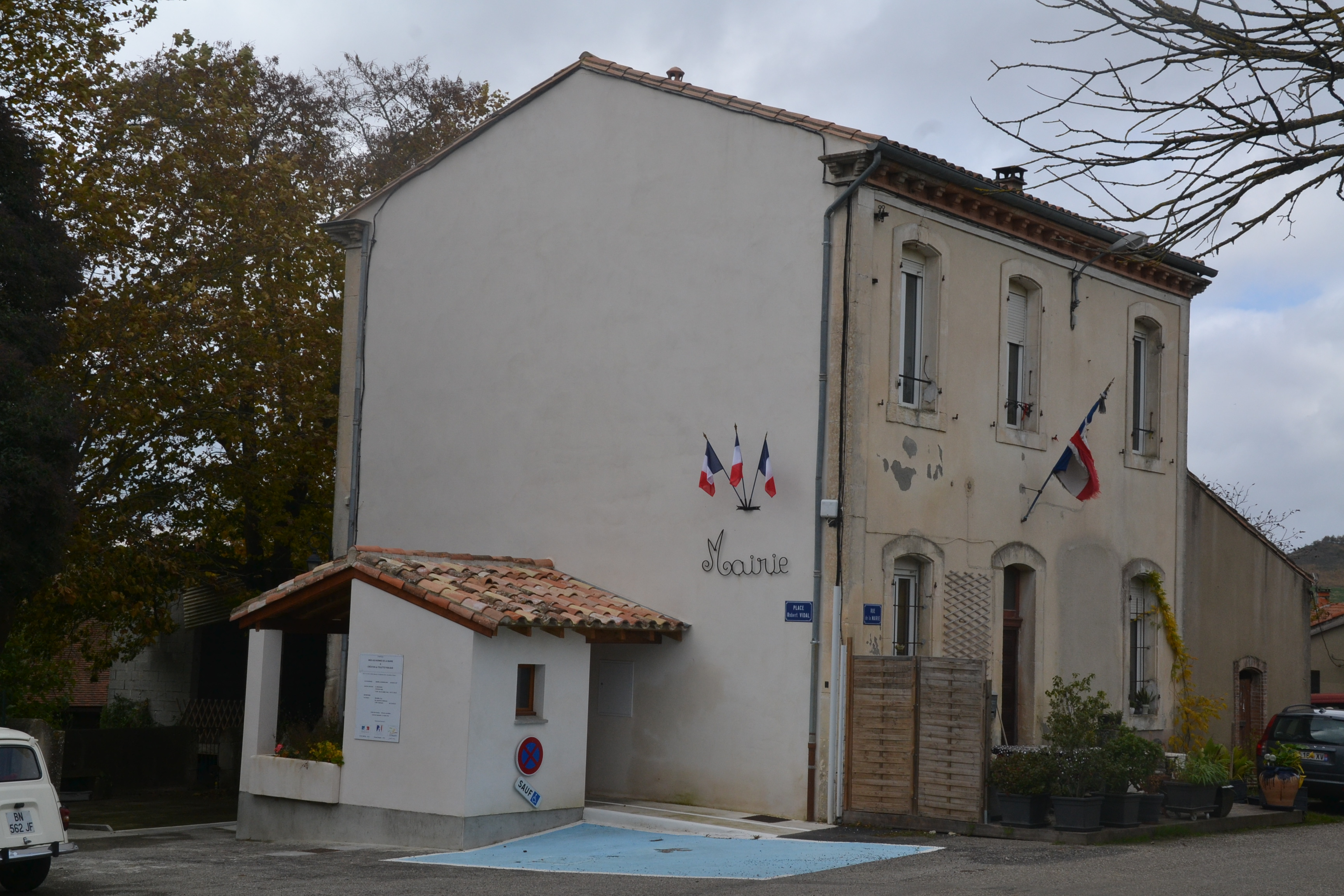
- The town hall in Seignalens

- Coat of arms
- Location of Seignalens
- Location within France Location within Occitanie
- Coordinates: 43°06′00″N 1°58′17″E
- Country: France
- Region: Occitania
- Department: Aude
- Arrondissement: Limoux
- Canton: La Piège au Razès

Government
  - Mayor (2020–2026): Marie-Claude Nouvel
- Area^{1}: 6.17 km^{2} (2.38 sq mi)
- Elevation: 350 m (1,150 ft)
- Highest elevation: 451 m (1,480 ft)
- Lowest elevation: 327 m (1,073 ft)
- Population (2023): 30
  - Density: 4.9/km^{2} (13/sq mi)
- Time zone: UTC+01:00 (CET)
  - Summer (DST): UTC+02:00 (CEST)
- INSEE/Postal code: 11375 /11240
- ^{1} French Land Register data, which excludes lakes, ponds, glaciers > 1 km^{2} (0.386 sq mi or 247 acres) and river estuaries.

Seignalens (French pronunciation: [sɛɲalɛ̃s]; Occitan: Senhalens) is a commune in the Aude department in the Occitanie region of southern France.

== Demographics ==
In 2011, the town had 35 residents.

Historical population
Year	Pop.	±% p.a.
1968	46	—
1975	43	−0.96%
1982	33	−3.71%
1990	19	−6.67%
1999	49	+11.10%
2007	32	−5.19%
2012	36	+2.38%
2017	32	−2.33%
2023	30	−1.07%
Source: INSEE

== Historic Sites and Monuments ==
- Church of the Invention de Saint-Etienne Romanesque, rebuilt (partly built with materials reused from the castle): choir vault Romanesque Gothic portal.
- A memorial to the dead was built thanks to a donation from the late Mr. Robert Vidal

== See also ==
- Communes of the Aude department
