= Belflou =

Commune in Occitanie, France

- Commune
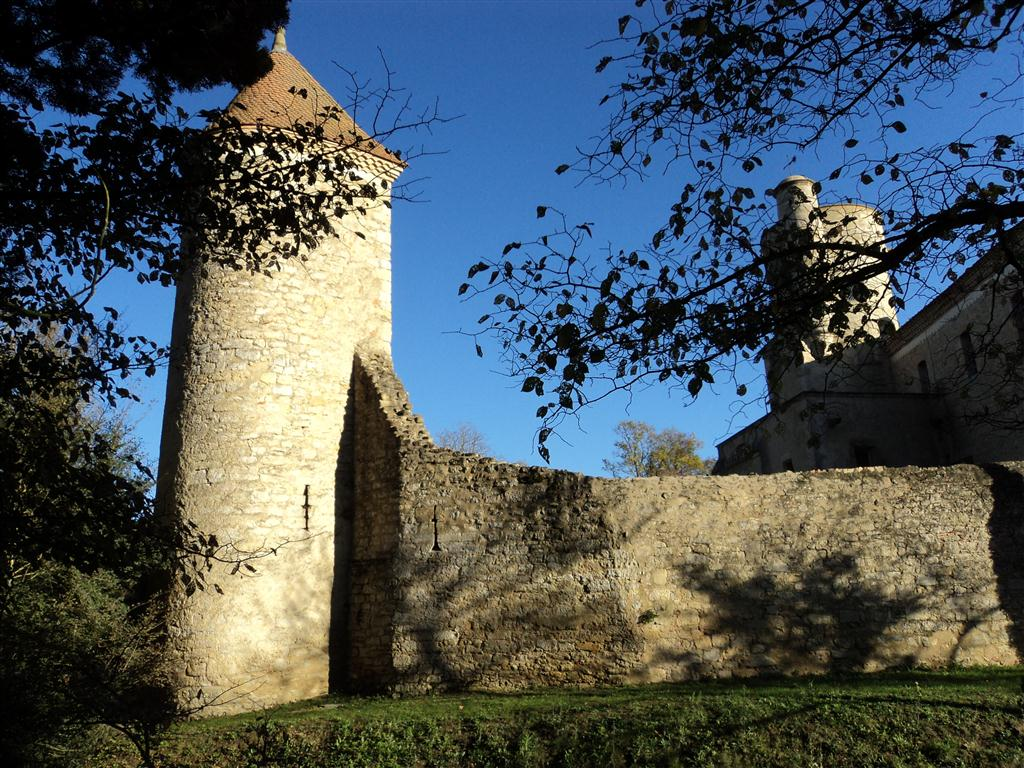
- The chateau in Belflou

- Coat of arms
- Location of Belflou
- Location within France Location within Occitanie
- Coordinates: 43°19′09″N 1°47′11″E
- Country: France
- Region: Occitania
- Department: Aude
- Arrondissement: Carcassonne
- Canton: La Piège au Razès

Government
  - Mayor (2020–2026): Bruno Pomart
- Area^{1}: 8.93 km^{2} (3.45 sq mi)
- Elevation: 216 m (709 ft)
- Highest elevation: 300 m (980 ft)
- Lowest elevation: 203 m (666 ft)
- Population (2023): 111
  - Density: 12.4/km^{2} (32.2/sq mi)
- Time zone: UTC+01:00 (CET)
  - Summer (DST): UTC+02:00 (CEST)
- INSEE/Postal code: 11030 /11410
- ^{1} French Land Register data, which excludes lakes, ponds, glaciers > 1 km^{2} (0.386 sq mi or 247 acres) and river estuaries.

Belflou is a commune in the Aude department in southern France.

== Population ==
Historical population
Year	Pop.	±% p.a.
1968	123	—
1975	101	−2.78%
1982	84	−2.60%
1990	85	+0.15%
1999	80	−0.67%
2007	103	+3.21%
2012	116	+2.41%
2017	121	+0.85%
2023	111	−1.43%
Source: INSEE

== See also ==
- Communes of the Aude department
