= Saint-Sernin, Aude =

Commune in Occitanie, France

Saint-Sernin
- Commune
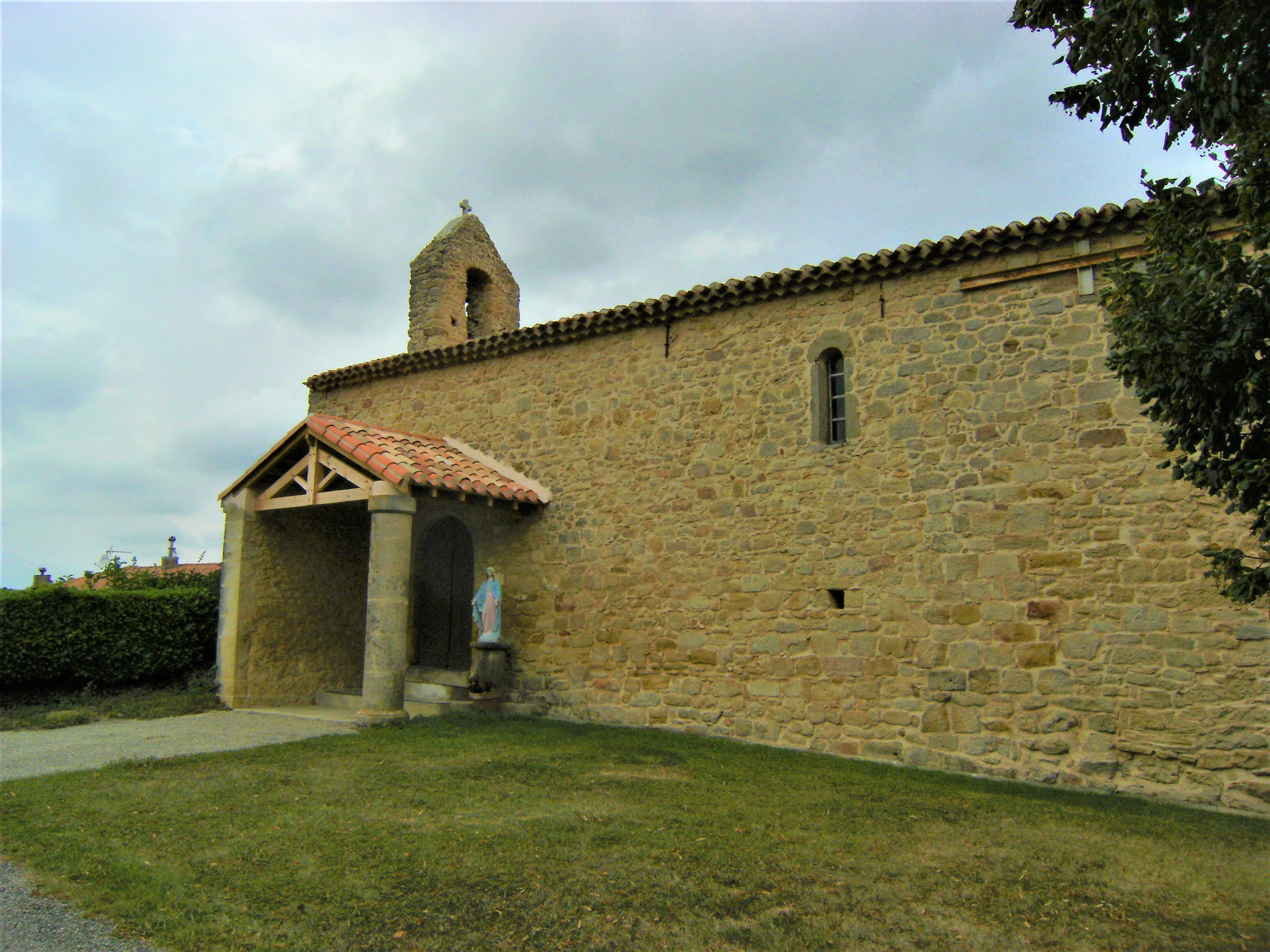
- The church in Saint-Sernin

- Coat of arms
- Location of Saint-Sernin
- Location within France Location within Occitanie
- Coordinates: 43°14′N 1°48′E
- Country: France
- Region: Occitania
- Department: Aude
- Arrondissement: Carcassonne
- Canton: La Piège au Razès

Government
  - Mayor (2020–2026): Emilien Guilhemat
- Area^{1}: 6.53 km^{2} (2.52 sq mi)
- Elevation: 340 m (1,120 ft)
- Highest elevation: 352 m (1,155 ft)
- Lowest elevation: 271 m (889 ft)
- Population (2023): 38
  - Density: 5.8/km^{2} (15/sq mi)
- Time zone: UTC+01:00 (CET)
  - Summer (DST): UTC+02:00 (CEST)
- INSEE/Postal code: 11365 /11420
- ^{1} French Land Register data, which excludes lakes, ponds, glaciers > 1 km^{2} (0.386 sq mi or 247 acres) and river estuaries.

Saint-Sernin (French pronunciation: [sɛ̃ sɛʁnɛ̃]; Occitan: Sant Sernin) is a commune in the Aude department in southern France.

== Population ==
Historical population
Year	Pop.	±% p.a.
1968	31	—
1975	43	+4.79%
1982	29	−5.47%
1990	35	+2.38%
1999	40	+1.49%
2007	30	−3.53%
2012	39	+5.39%
2017	38	−0.52%
2023	38	+0.00%
Source: INSEE

== See also ==
- Communes of the Aude department
