= Mireval-Lauragais =

Commune in Occitanie, France

- Commune
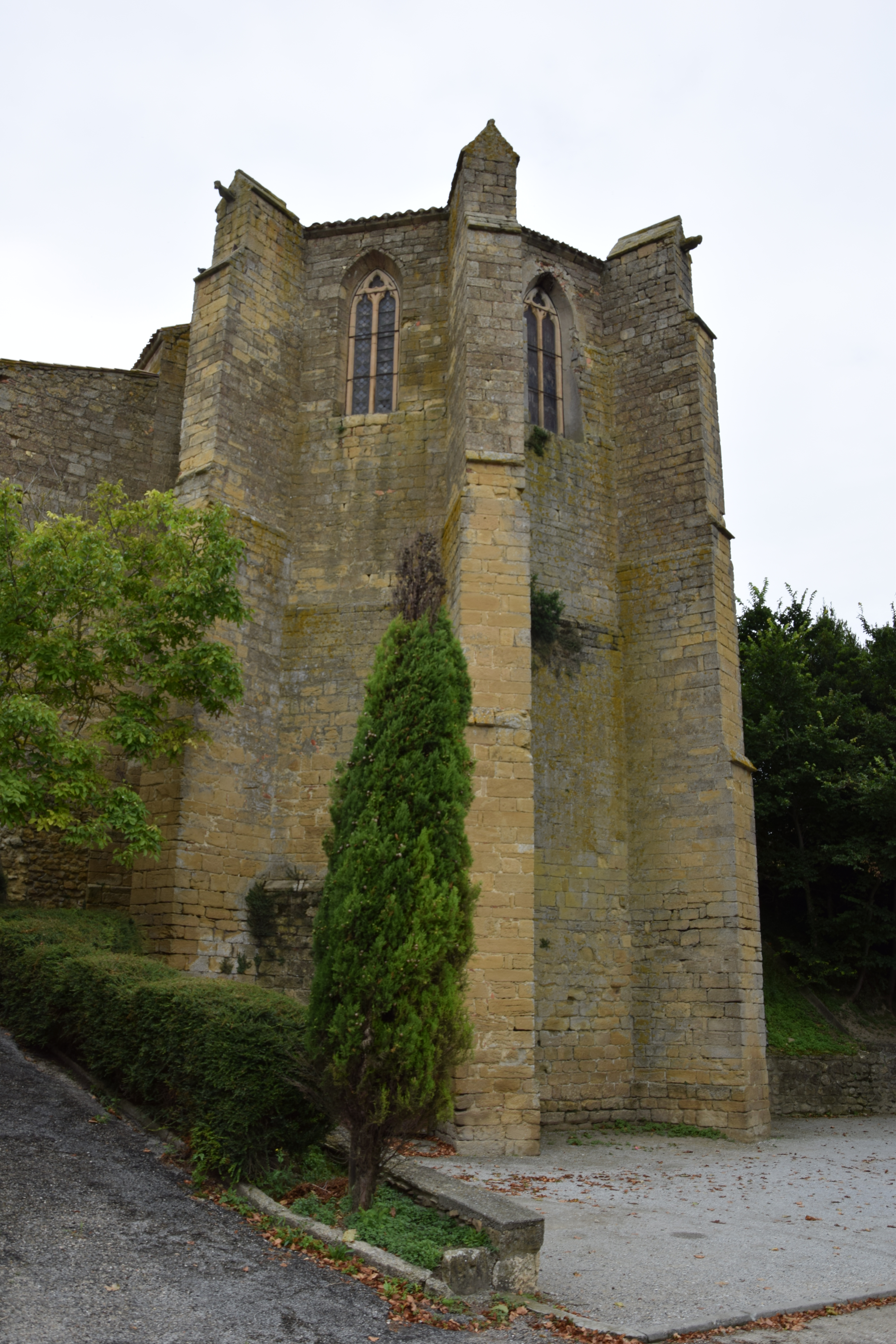
- The church in Mireval-Lauragais

- Coat of arms
- Location of Mireval-Lauragais
- Location within France Location within Occitanie
- Coordinates: 43°15′20″N 1°57′33″E
- Country: France
- Region: Occitania
- Department: Aude
- Arrondissement: Carcassonne
- Canton: La Piège au Razès
- Intercommunality: Castelnaudary Lauragais Audois

Government
  - Mayor (2020–2026): Marie-Paule Cau
- Area^{1}: 10.32 km^{2} (3.98 sq mi)
- Elevation: 201 m (659 ft)
- Highest elevation: 346 m (1,135 ft)
- Lowest elevation: 143 m (469 ft)
- Population (2023): 193
  - Density: 18.7/km^{2} (48.4/sq mi)
- Time zone: UTC+01:00 (CET)
  - Summer (DST): UTC+02:00 (CEST)
- INSEE/Postal code: 11234 /11400
- ^{1} French Land Register data, which excludes lakes, ponds, glaciers > 1 km^{2} (0.386 sq mi or 247 acres) and river estuaries.

Mireval-Lauragais (French pronunciation: [miʁval loʁaɡɛ]; Occitan: Miraval de Lauragués) is a commune in the Aude department in southern France.

== Population ==
Historical population
Year	Pop.	±% p.a.
1968	168	—
1975	135	−3.08%
1982	124	−1.21%
1990	147	+2.15%
1999	164	+1.22%
2007	161	−0.23%
2012	157	−0.50%
2017	171	+1.72%
2023	193	+2.04%
Source: INSEE

== See also ==
- Communes of the Aude department
