= Ribouisse =

Commune in Occitanie, France

- Commune
- Coat of arms
- Location of Ribouisse
- Location within France Location within Occitanie
- Coordinates: 43°11′00″N 1°53′54″E
- Country: France
- Region: Occitania
- Department: Aude
- Arrondissement: Carcassonne
- Canton: La Piège au Razès

Government
  - Mayor (2020–2026): Christian Lucato
- Area^{1}: 10.21 km^{2} (3.94 sq mi)
- Elevation: 300 m (980 ft)
- Highest elevation: 435 m (1,427 ft)
- Lowest elevation: 275 m (902 ft)
- Population (2023): 97
  - Density: 9.5/km^{2} (25/sq mi)
- Time zone: UTC+01:00 (CET)
  - Summer (DST): UTC+02:00 (CEST)
- INSEE/Postal code: 11312 /11270
- ^{1} French Land Register data, which excludes lakes, ponds, glaciers > 1 km^{2} (0.386 sq mi or 247 acres) and river estuaries.

Ribouisse (French pronunciation: [ʁibwis]; Occitan: Riboissa) is a commune in the Aude department in southern France.

== Population ==
Historical population
| Year | Pop. | ±% p.a. |
|---|---|---|
| 1968 | 152 | — |
| 1975 | 122 | −3.09% |
| 1982 | 110 | −1.47% |
| 1990 | 122 | +1.30% |
| 1999 | 103 | −1.86% |
| 2007 | 105 | +0.24% |
| 2012 | 106 | +0.19% |
| 2017 | 109 | +0.56% |
| 2023 | 97 | −1.93% |
Source: INSEE

The inhabitants of Ribouisse are known as Ribouissais.

== See also ==
- Communes of the Aude department
