= Plaigne =

Commune in Occitanie, France

- Commune
- Coat of arms
- Location of Plaigne
- Location within France Location within Occitanie
- Coordinates: 43°10′28″N 1°48′45″E
- Country: France
- Region: Occitania
- Department: Aude
- Arrondissement: Carcassonne
- Canton: La Piège au Razès

Government
  - Mayor (2020–2026): Didier Alric
- Area^{1}: 13.19 km^{2} (5.09 sq mi)
- Elevation: 308 m (1,010 ft)
- Highest elevation: 392 m (1,286 ft)
- Lowest elevation: 249 m (817 ft)
- Population (2023): 119
  - Density: 9.02/km^{2} (23.4/sq mi)
- Time zone: UTC+01:00 (CET)
  - Summer (DST): UTC+02:00 (CEST)
- INSEE/Postal code: 11290 /11420
- ^{1} French Land Register data, which excludes lakes, ponds, glaciers > 1 km^{2} (0.386 sq mi or 247 acres) and river estuaries.

Plaigne (French pronunciation: [plɛɲ]; Occitan: Planha) is a commune in the Aude department in southern France.

== Population ==
Historical population
Year	Pop.	±% p.a.
1968	160	—
1975	157	−0.27%
1982	129	−2.77%
1990	141	+1.12%
1999	128	−1.07%
2007	121	−0.70%
2012	109	−2.07%
2017	116	+1.25%
2023	119	+0.43%
Source: INSEE

== See also ==
- Communes of the Aude department
