= Malviès =

Commune in Occitanie, France

- Commune
- Coat of arms
- Location of Malviès
- Location within France Location within Occitanie
- Coordinates: 43°07′11″N 2°11′07″E
- Country: France
- Region: Occitania
- Department: Aude
- Arrondissement: Limoux
- Canton: La Piège au Razès

Government
  - Mayor (2020–2026): Evelyne Santini-Trastet
- Area^{1}: 7.22 km^{2} (2.79 sq mi)
- Elevation: 195 m (640 ft)
- Highest elevation: 280 m (920 ft)
- Lowest elevation: 169 m (554 ft)
- Population (2023): 361
  - Density: 50.0/km^{2} (129/sq mi)
- Time zone: UTC+01:00 (CET)
  - Summer (DST): UTC+02:00 (CEST)
- INSEE/Postal code: 11216 /11300
- ^{1} French Land Register data, which excludes lakes, ponds, glaciers > 1 km^{2} (0.386 sq mi or 247 acres) and river estuaries.

Malviès (French pronunciation: [malvjɛs]; Occitan: Malvièrs) is a commune in the Aude department in southern France.

== Population ==
Historical population
Year	Pop.	±% p.a.
1968	324	—
1975	259	−3.15%
1982	263	+0.22%
1990	257	−0.29%
1999	268	+0.47%
2007	348	+3.32%
2012	389	+2.25%
2017	369	−1.05%
2023	361	−0.36%
Source: INSEE

== See also ==
- Communes of the Aude department
