= Pécharic-et-le-Py =

Commune in Occitanie, France

- Commune
- Coat of arms
- Location of Pécharic-et-le-Py
- Location within France Location within Occitanie
- Coordinates: 43°11′15″N 1°50′11″E
- Country: France
- Region: Occitania
- Department: Aude
- Arrondissement: Carcassonne
- Canton: La Piège au Razès

Government
  - Mayor (2020–2026): Floréal Soler
- Area^{1}: 5.77 km^{2} (2.23 sq mi)
- Elevation: 300 m (980 ft)
- Highest elevation: 346 m (1,135 ft)
- Lowest elevation: 260 m (850 ft)
- Population (2023): 30
  - Density: 5.2/km^{2} (13/sq mi)
- Time zone: UTC+01:00 (CET)
  - Summer (DST): UTC+02:00 (CEST)
- INSEE/Postal code: 11277 /11420
- ^{1} French Land Register data, which excludes lakes, ponds, glaciers > 1 km^{2} (0.386 sq mi or 247 acres) and river estuaries.

Pécharic-et-le-Py (French pronunciation: [peʃaʁik e lə pi]; Occitan: Puèg Aric e Le Pin) is a commune in the Aude department in southern France.

== Population ==
Historical population
Year	Pop.	±% p.a.
1968	32	—
1975	23	−4.61%
1982	21	−1.29%
1990	30	+4.56%
1999	31	+0.36%
2007	29	−0.83%
2012	33	+2.62%
2017	27	−3.93%
2023	30	+1.77%
Source: INSEE

== See also ==
- Communes of the Aude department
