= Saint-Gaudéric =

Commune in Occitanie, France

- Commune
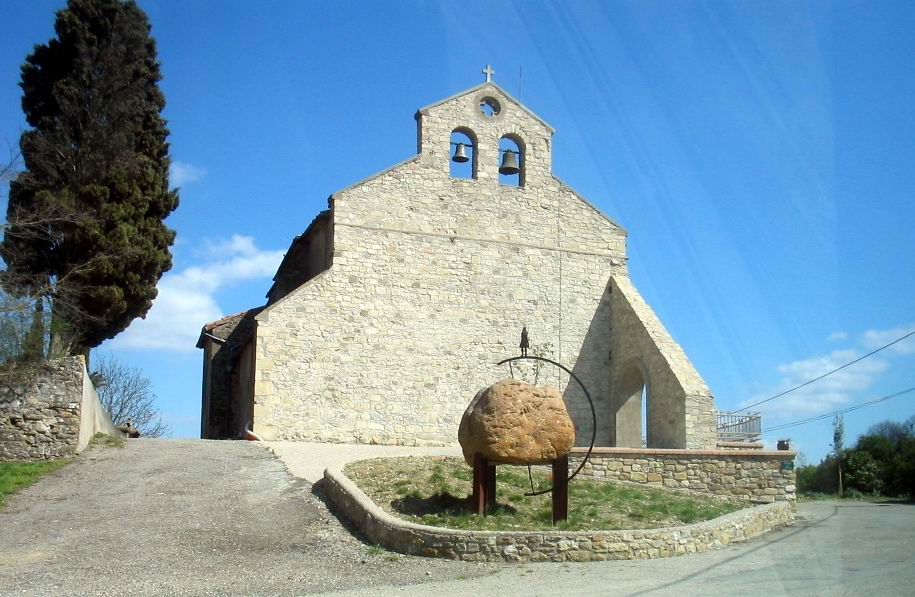
- The church in Saint-Gaudéric

- Coat of arms
- Location of Saint-Gaudéric
- Location within France Location within Occitanie
- Coordinates: 43°07′48″N 1°56′50″E
- Country: France
- Region: Occitania
- Department: Aude
- Arrondissement: Carcassonne
- Canton: La Piège au Razès

Government
  - Mayor (2020–2026): Jean-Claude Marty
- Area^{1}: 11.13 km^{2} (4.30 sq mi)
- Elevation: 481 m (1,578 ft)
- Highest elevation: 451 m (1,480 ft)
- Lowest elevation: 318 m (1,043 ft)
- Population (2023): 108
  - Density: 9.70/km^{2} (25.1/sq mi)
- Time zone: UTC+01:00 (CET)
  - Summer (DST): UTC+02:00 (CEST)
- INSEE/Postal code: 11343 /11270
- ^{1} French Land Register data, which excludes lakes, ponds, glaciers > 1 km^{2} (0.386 sq mi or 247 acres) and river estuaries.

Saint-Gaudéric (French pronunciation: [sɛ̃ ɡodeʁik]; Occitan: Sant Gauderic) is a commune in the Aude department in southern France.

== Population ==
Historical population
Year	Pop.	±% p.a.
1968	58	—
1975	40	−5.17%
1982	39	−0.36%
1990	51	+3.41%
1999	58	+1.44%
2007	71	+2.56%
2012	82	+2.92%
2017	115	+7.00%
2023	108	−1.04%
Source: INSEE

== See also ==
- Communes of the Aude department
