= Mayreville =

Commune in Occitanie, France

- Commune
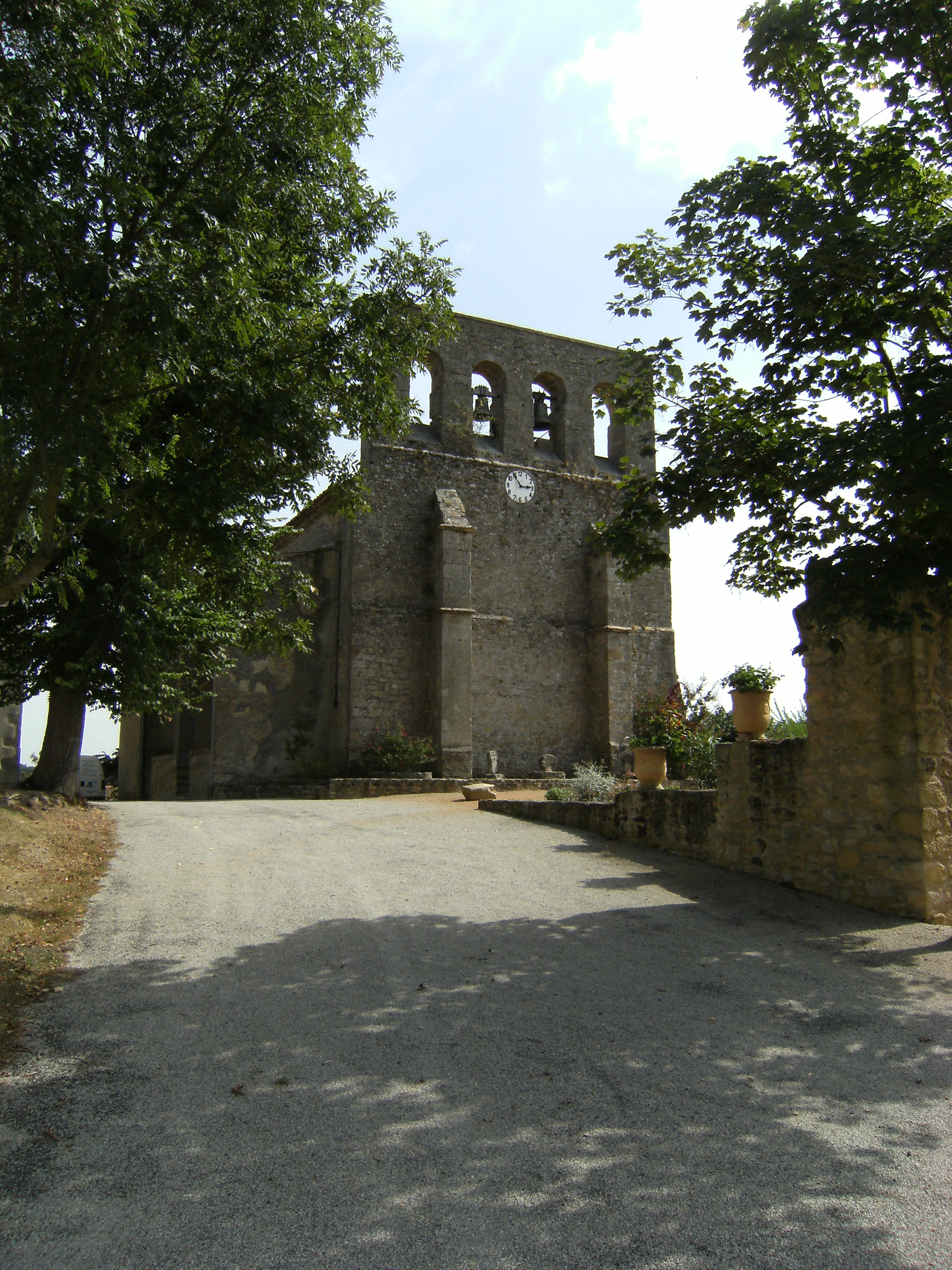
- Saint-Pierre

- Coat of arms
- Location of Mayreville
- Location within France Location within Occitanie
- Coordinates: 43°14′N 1°50′E
- Country: France
- Region: Occitania
- Department: Aude
- Arrondissement: Carcassonne
- Canton: La Piège au Razès
- Intercommunality: Castelnaudary Lauragais Audois

Government
  - Mayor (2020–2026): Sandrine Campguilhem
- Area^{1}: 8.17 km^{2} (3.15 sq mi)
- Elevation: 310 m (1,020 ft)
- Highest elevation: 361 m (1,184 ft)
- Lowest elevation: 262 m (860 ft)
- Population (2023): 86
  - Density: 11/km^{2} (27/sq mi)
- Time zone: UTC+01:00 (CET)
  - Summer (DST): UTC+02:00 (CEST)
- INSEE/Postal code: 11226 /11420
- ^{1} French Land Register data, which excludes lakes, ponds, glaciers > 1 km^{2} (0.386 sq mi or 247 acres) and river estuaries.

Mayreville (French pronunciation: [mɛʁvil]; Occitan: Mairevila) is a commune in the Aude department in southern France.

== Population ==
Historical population
Year	Pop.	±% p.a.
1968	88	—
1975	71	−3.02%
1982	75	+0.79%
1990	67	−1.40%
1999	76	+1.41%
2007	65	−1.94%
2012	73	+2.35%
2017	75	+0.54%
2023	86	+2.31%
Source: INSEE

== See also ==
- Communes of the Aude department
