= Belvèze-du-Razès =

Commune in Occitanie, France

- Commune
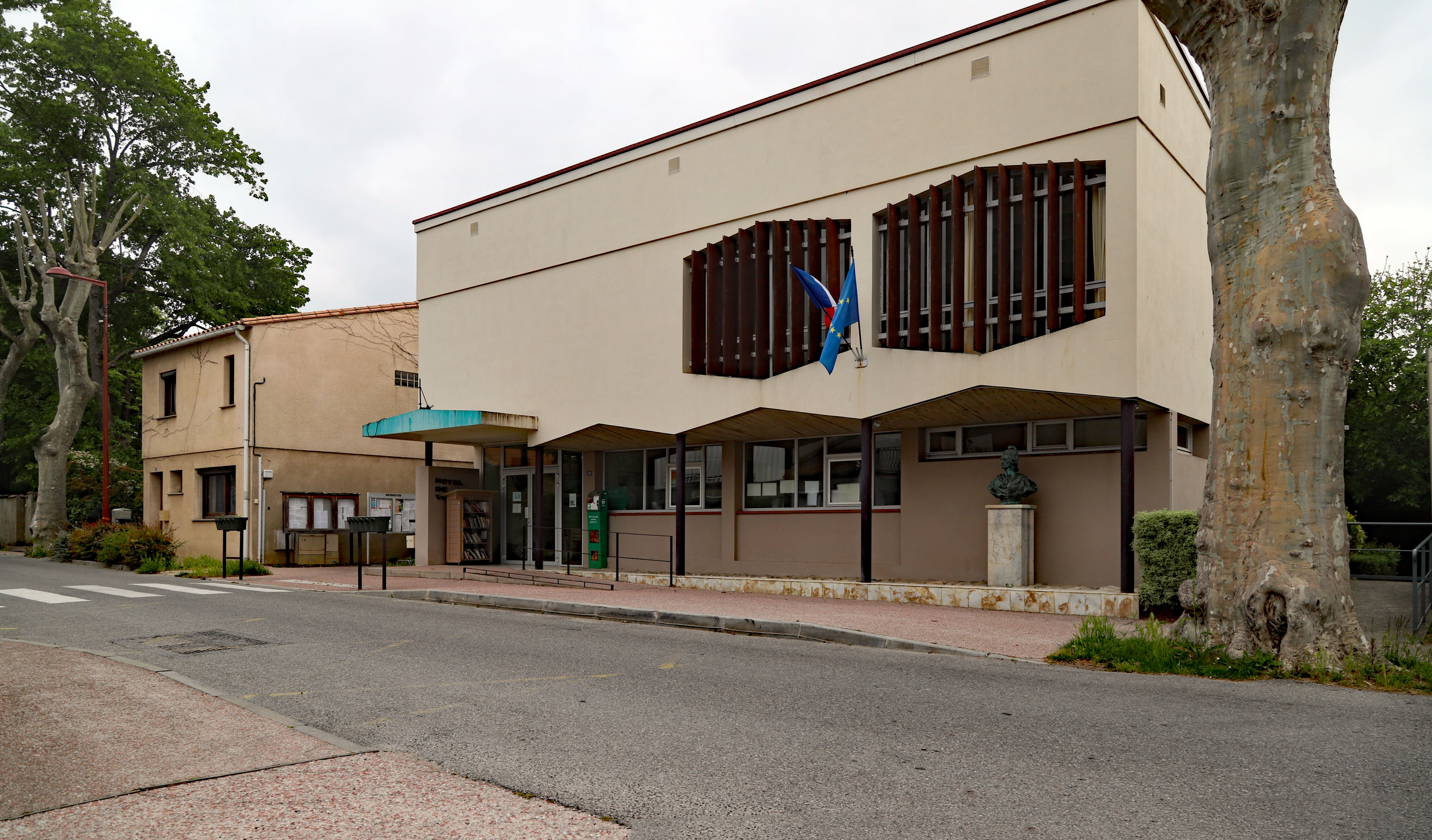
- Town hall

- Coat of arms
- Location of Belvèze-du-Razès
- Location within France Location within Occitanie
- Coordinates: 43°07′33″N 2°05′45″E
- Country: France
- Region: Occitania
- Department: Aude
- Arrondissement: Limoux
- Canton: La Piège au Razès

Government
  - Mayor (2020–2026): André Amat
- Area^{1}: 4.52 km^{2} (1.75 sq mi)
- Elevation: 236 m (774 ft)
- Highest elevation: 344 m (1,129 ft)
- Lowest elevation: 219 m (719 ft)
- Population (2023): 884
  - Density: 196/km^{2} (507/sq mi)
- Time zone: UTC+01:00 (CET)
  - Summer (DST): UTC+02:00 (CEST)
- INSEE/Postal code: 11034 /11240
- ^{1} French Land Register data, which excludes lakes, ponds, glaciers > 1 km^{2} (0.386 sq mi or 247 acres) and river estuaries.

Belvèze-du-Razès (French pronunciation: [bɛlvɛz dy ʁazɛs]; Occitan: Bèlvéser) is a commune in the Aude department in southern France.

== Population ==
Historical population
Year	Pop.	±% p.a.
1968	610	—
1975	666	+1.26%
1982	738	+1.48%
1990	836	+1.57%
1999	765	−0.98%
2007	797	+0.51%
2012	884	+2.09%
2017	868	−0.36%
2023	884	+0.30%
Source: INSEE

== See also ==
- Communes of the Aude department
