= Villautou =

Commune in Occitanie, France

- Commune
- Coat of arms
- Location of Villautou
- Location within France Location within Occitanie
- Coordinates: 43°09′37″N 1°49′57″E
- Country: France
- Region: Occitania
- Department: Aude
- Arrondissement: Carcassonne
- Canton: La Piège au Razès

Government
  - Mayor (2020–2026): Jean-Claude Maurette
- Area^{1}: 5.97 km^{2} (2.31 sq mi)
- Elevation: 330 m (1,080 ft)
- Highest elevation: 424 m (1,391 ft)
- Lowest elevation: 261 m (856 ft)
- Population (2023): 68
  - Density: 11/km^{2} (30/sq mi)
- Time zone: UTC+01:00 (CET)
  - Summer (DST): UTC+02:00 (CEST)
- INSEE/Postal code: 11419 /11420
- ^{1} French Land Register data, which excludes lakes, ponds, glaciers > 1 km^{2} (0.386 sq mi or 247 acres) and river estuaries.

Villautou (French pronunciation: [vilotu]; Occitan: Vilauton) is a commune in the Aude department in southern France.

== Population ==
Historical population
Year	Pop.	±% p.a.
1968	67	—
1975	44	−5.83%
1982	43	−0.33%
1990	44	+0.29%
1999	50	+1.43%
2007	47	−0.77%
2012	58	+4.30%
2017	63	+1.67%
2023	68	+1.28%
Source: INSEE

== See also ==
- Communes of the Aude department
