= Ferran =

Commune in Occitanie, France

- Commune
- Coat of arms
- Location of Ferran
- Location within France Location within Occitanie
- Coordinates: 43°09′12″N 2°05′26″E
- Country: France
- Region: Occitania
- Department: Aude
- Arrondissement: Carcassonne
- Canton: La Piège au Razès

Government
  - Mayor (2020–2026): Dominique Fromilhague
- Area^{1}: 5.86 km^{2} (2.26 sq mi)
- Elevation: 260 m (850 ft)
- Highest elevation: 300 m (980 ft)
- Lowest elevation: 209 m (686 ft)
- Population (2023): 125
  - Density: 21.3/km^{2} (55.2/sq mi)
- Time zone: UTC+01:00 (CET)
  - Summer (DST): UTC+02:00 (CEST)
- INSEE/Postal code: 11141 /11240
- ^{1} French Land Register data, which excludes lakes, ponds, glaciers > 1 km^{2} (0.386 sq mi or 247 acres) and river estuaries.

Ferran (French pronunciation: [feʁɑ̃]) is a commune in the Aude department in southern France.

== Population ==
Historical population
Year	Pop.	±% p.a.
1968	83	—
1975	59	−4.76%
1982	70	+2.47%
1990	57	−2.54%
1999	64	+1.30%
2007	99	+5.60%
2012	103	+0.80%
2017	111	+1.51%
2023	125	+2.00%
Source: INSEE

== See also ==
- Communes of the Aude department
