= Sainte-Camelle =

Commune in Occitanie, France

- Commune
- Coat of arms
- Location of Sainte-Camelle
- Location within France Location within Occitanie
- Coordinates: 43°16′11″N 1°48′23″E
- Country: France
- Region: Occitania
- Department: Aude
- Arrondissement: Carcassonne
- Canton: La Piège au Razès

Government
  - Mayor (2020–2026): Bernard Vidal
- Area^{1}: 9.52 km^{2} (3.68 sq mi)
- Elevation: 230 m (750 ft)
- Highest elevation: 360 m (1,180 ft)
- Lowest elevation: 227 m (745 ft)
- Population (2023): 127
  - Density: 13.3/km^{2} (34.6/sq mi)
- Time zone: UTC+01:00 (CET)
  - Summer (DST): UTC+02:00 (CEST)
- INSEE/Postal code: 11334 /11410
- ^{1} French Land Register data, which excludes lakes, ponds, glaciers > 1 km^{2} (0.386 sq mi or 247 acres) and river estuaries.

Sainte-Camelle (French pronunciation: [sɛ̃t kamɛl]; Occitan: Santa Camèla) is a municipality in the Aude department, Occitanie region, in the southern part of France at 45 km from Carcassonne, the department capital. Sainte-Camelle is 623 km from Paris.

== Population ==
Historical population
Year	Pop.	±% p.a.
1968	129	—
1975	111	−2.12%
1982	95	−2.20%
1990	94	−0.13%
1999	102	+0.91%
2007	112	+1.18%
2012	112	+0.00%
2017	119	+1.22%
2023	127	+1.09%
Source: INSEE

== See also ==
- Communes of the Aude department
