= Pomy, Aude =

Commune in Occitanie, France

Pomy
- Commune
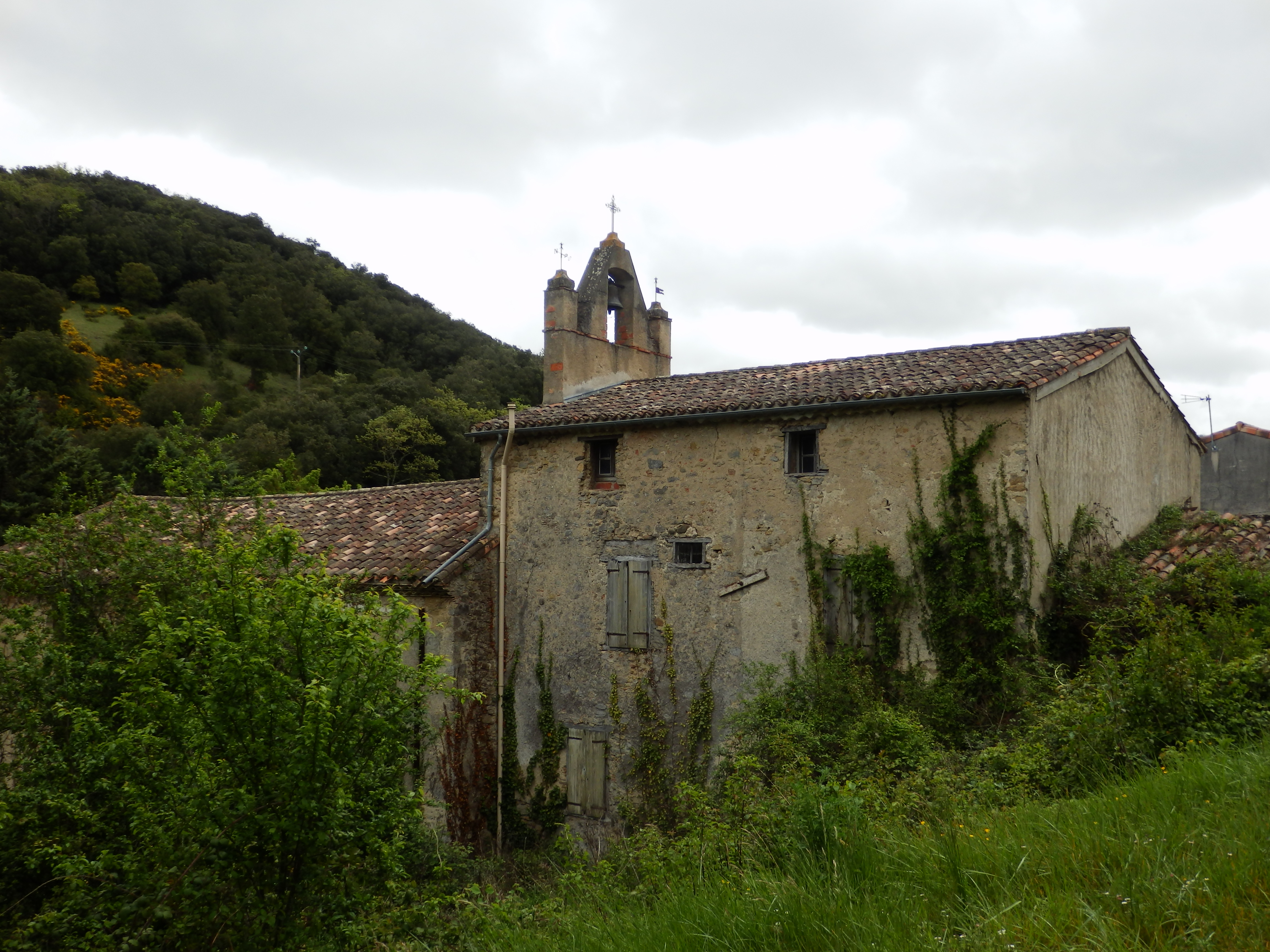
- The church in Pomy

- Coat of arms
- Location of Pomy
- Location within France Location within Occitanie
- Coordinates: 43°03′34″N 2°03′52″E
- Country: France
- Region: Occitania
- Department: Aude
- Arrondissement: Limoux
- Canton: La Piège au Razès

Government
  - Mayor (2020–2026): Alain Bouille
- Area^{1}: 6 km^{2} (2.3 sq mi)
- Highest elevation: 560 m (1,840 ft)
- Lowest elevation: 297 m (974 ft)
- Population (2023): 51
  - Density: 8.5/km^{2} (22/sq mi)
- Time zone: UTC+01:00 (CET)
  - Summer (DST): UTC+02:00 (CEST)
- INSEE/Postal code: 11294 /11300
- ^{1} French Land Register data, which excludes lakes, ponds, glaciers > 1 km^{2} (0.386 sq mi or 247 acres) and river estuaries.

Pomy (French pronunciation: [pɔmi]; Occitan: Pontmir) is a commune in the Aude department in southern France.

== Population ==
Historical population
Year	Pop.	±% p.a.
1968	20	—
1975	21	+0.70%
1982	65	+17.52%
1990	62	−0.59%
1999	49	−2.58%
2007	47	−0.52%
2012	58	+4.30%
2017	59	+0.34%
2023	51	−2.40%
Source: INSEE

== Heraldry ==
Arms of Pomy	Blazon: Or, Bordure sable.

== See also ==
- Communes of the Aude department
