= Gramazie =

Commune in Occitanie, France

- Commune
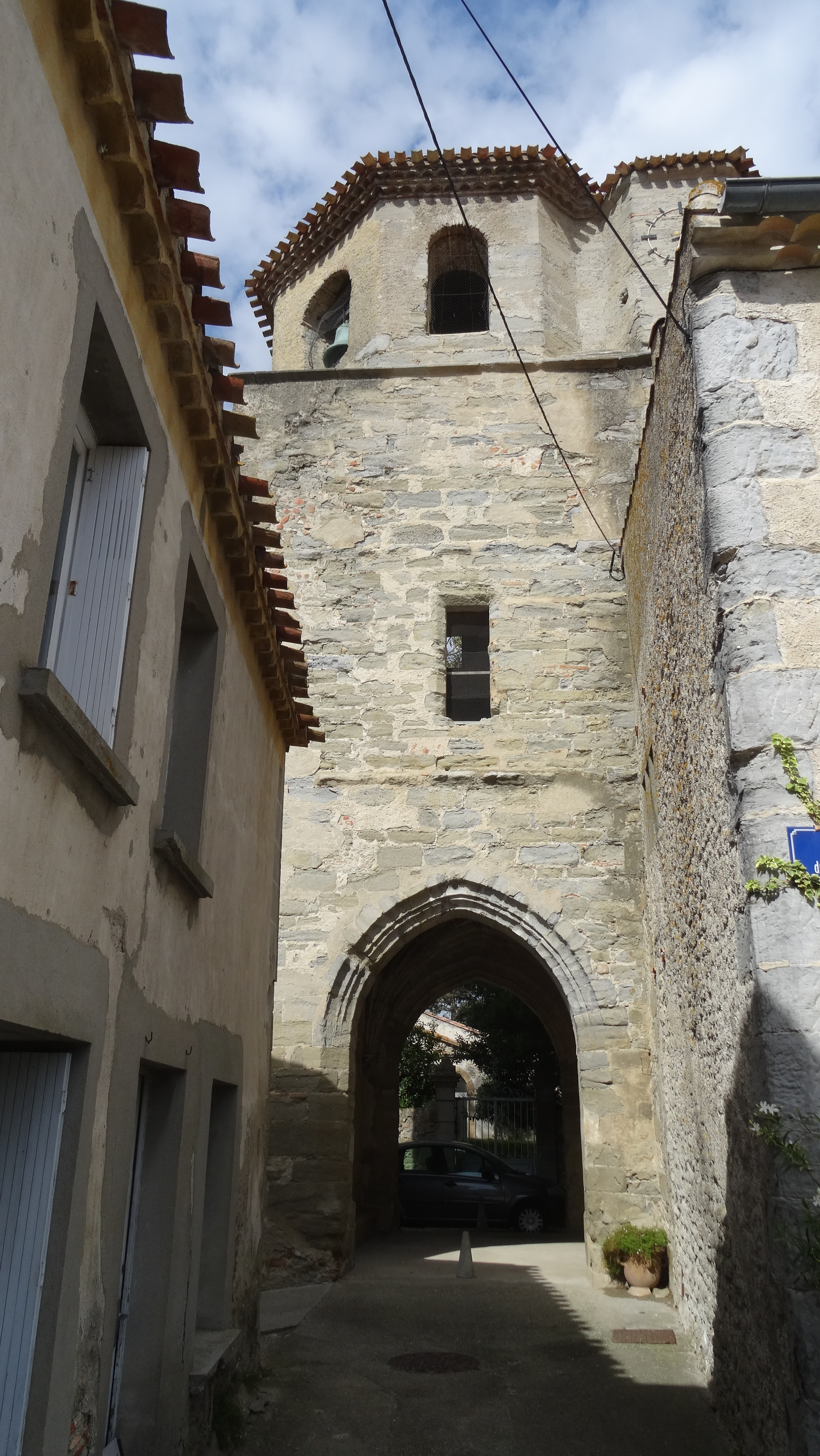
- The church in Gramazie

- Coat of arms
- Location of Gramazie
- Location within France Location within Occitanie
- Coordinates: 43°08′24″N 2°05′52″E
- Country: France
- Region: Occitania
- Department: Aude
- Arrondissement: Limoux
- Canton: La Piège au Razès
- Intercommunality: Limouxin

Government
  - Mayor (2020–2026): Pierre Rainier
- Area^{1}: 2 km^{2} (0.77 sq mi)
- Elevation: 220 m (720 ft)
- Highest elevation: 253 m (830 ft)
- Lowest elevation: 210 m (690 ft)
- Population (2023): 130
  - Density: 65/km^{2} (170/sq mi)
- Time zone: UTC+01:00 (CET)
  - Summer (DST): UTC+02:00 (CEST)
- INSEE/Postal code: 11167 /11240
- ^{1} French Land Register data, which excludes lakes, ponds, glaciers > 1 km^{2} (0.386 sq mi or 247 acres) and river estuaries.

Gramazie (French pronunciation: [ɡʁamazi]; Occitan: Gramàsia) is a commune in the Aude department in southern France.

== Population ==
Historical population
Year	Pop.	±% p.a.
1968	84	—
1975	71	−2.37%
1982	59	−2.61%
1990	89	+5.27%
1999	71	−2.48%
2007	98	+4.11%
2012	103	+1.00%
2017	117	+2.58%
2023	130	+1.77%
Source: INSEE

== See also ==
- Communes of the Aude department
