= Brézilhac =

Commune in Occitanie, France

- Commune
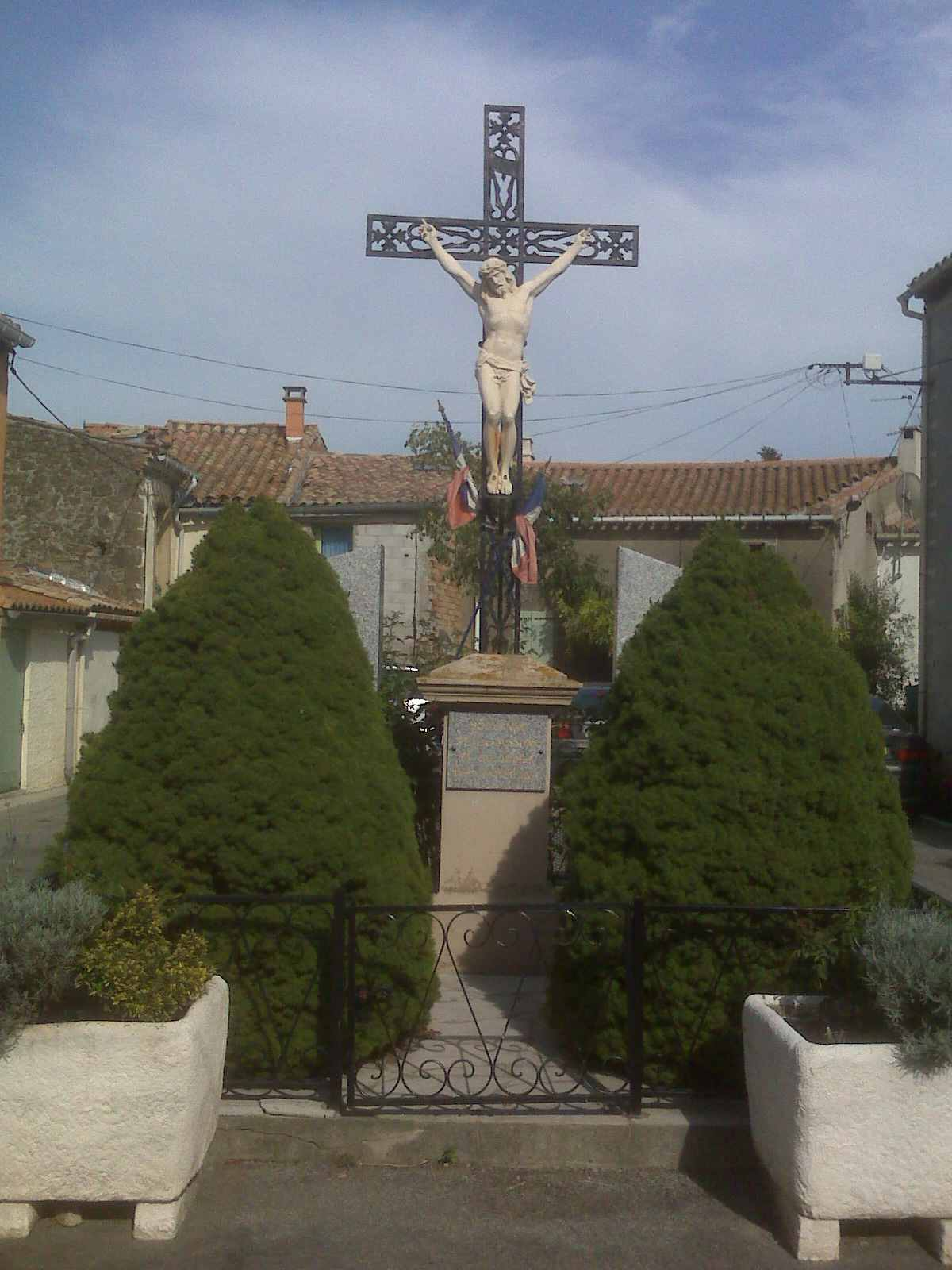
- War memorial on the Place de la Liberation

- Coat of arms
- Location of Brézilhac
- Location within France Location within Occitanie
- Coordinates: 43°10′08″N 2°04′49″E
- Country: France
- Region: Occitania
- Department: Aude
- Arrondissement: Carcassonne
- Canton: La Piège au Razès

Government
  - Mayor (2020–2026): Alexis Chavardès
- Area^{1}: 6.82 km^{2} (2.63 sq mi)
- Elevation: 125 m (410 ft)
- Highest elevation: 353 m (1,158 ft)
- Lowest elevation: 210 m (690 ft)
- Population (2023): 172
  - Density: 25.2/km^{2} (65.3/sq mi)
- Time zone: UTC+01:00 (CET)
  - Summer (DST): UTC+02:00 (CEST)
- INSEE/Postal code: 11051 /11270
- ^{1} French Land Register data, which excludes lakes, ponds, glaciers > 1 km^{2} (0.386 sq mi or 247 acres) and river estuaries.

Brézilhac (French pronunciation: [bʁezijak]; Occitan: Bresilhac) is a commune in the Aude department in southern France.

== Population ==
Historical population
Year	Pop.	±% p.a.
1968	193	—
1975	177	−1.23%
1982	132	−4.10%
1990	114	−1.82%
1999	118	+0.38%
2007	156	+3.55%
2012	181	+3.02%
2017	174	−0.79%
2023	172	−0.19%
Source: INSEE

=== Heraldry ===
Arms of Aude	Blazon: Or, Bordure vert.

== See also ==
- Communes of the Aude department
