= Donazac =

Commune in Occitanie, France

- Commune
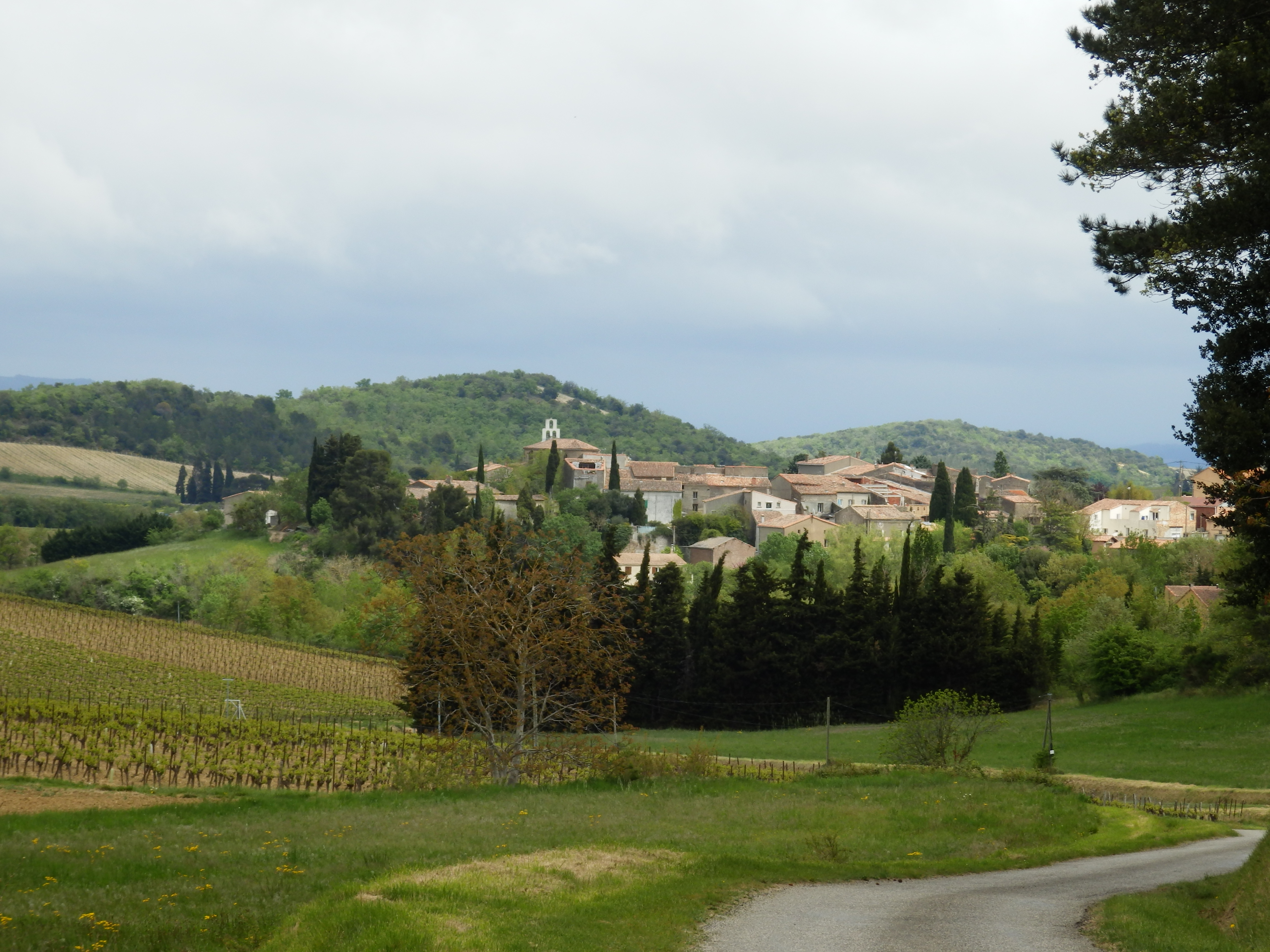
- A general view of Donazac

- Coat of arms
- Location of Donazac
- Location within France Location within Occitanie
- Coordinates: 43°04′41″N 2°07′12″E
- Country: France
- Region: Occitania
- Department: Aude
- Arrondissement: Limoux
- Canton: La Piège au Razès

Government
  - Mayor (2020–2026): Jean-Pierre Mestre
- Area^{1}: 5.06 km^{2} (1.95 sq mi)
- Elevation: 285 m (935 ft)
- Highest elevation: 388 m (1,273 ft)
- Lowest elevation: 203 m (666 ft)
- Population (2023): 110
  - Density: 22/km^{2} (56/sq mi)
- Time zone: UTC+01:00 (CET)
  - Summer (DST): UTC+02:00 (CEST)
- INSEE/Postal code: 11121 /11240
- ^{1} French Land Register data, which excludes lakes, ponds, glaciers > 1 km^{2} (0.386 sq mi or 247 acres) and river estuaries.

Donazac (French pronunciation: [dɔnazak]; Occitan: Donasac) is a commune in the Aude department in southern France.

== Population ==
Historical population
Year	Pop.	±% p.a.
1968	144	—
1975	104	−4.54%
1982	122	+2.31%
1990	89	−3.87%
1999	88	−0.13%
2007	95	+0.96%
2012	98	+0.62%
2017	109	+2.15%
2023	110	+0.15%
Source: INSEE

== See also ==
- Communes of the Aude department
