= Gourvieille =

Commune in Occitanie, France

- Commune
- Location of Gourvieille
- Location within France Location within Occitanie
- Coordinates: 43°20′25″N 1°46′59″E
- Country: France
- Region: Occitania
- Department: Aude
- Arrondissement: Carcassonne
- Canton: La Piège au Razès

Government
  - Mayor (2020–2026): René Méric
- Area^{1}: 3.09 km^{2} (1.19 sq mi)
- Elevation: 214 m (702 ft)
- Highest elevation: 275 m (902 ft)
- Lowest elevation: 197 m (646 ft)
- Population (2023): 68
  - Density: 22/km^{2} (57/sq mi)
- Time zone: UTC+01:00 (CET)
  - Summer (DST): UTC+02:00 (CEST)
- INSEE/Postal code: 11166 /11410
- ^{1} French Land Register data, which excludes lakes, ponds, glaciers > 1 km^{2} (0.386 sq mi or 247 acres) and river estuaries.

Gourvieille (French pronunciation: [ɡuʁvjɛj]; Occitan: Gorvièla) is a commune in the Aude department in southern France.

== Population ==
Historical population
Year	Pop.	±% p.a.
1968	43	—
1975	42	−0.34%
1982	45	+0.99%
1990	43	−0.57%
1999	55	+2.77%
2007	57	+0.45%
2012	58	+0.35%
2017	76	+5.55%
2023	68	−1.84%
Source: INSEE

== See also ==
- Communes of the Aude department
