= Cumiès =

Commune in Occitanie, France

- Commune
- Coat of arms
- Location of Cumiès
- Location within France Location within Occitanie
- Coordinates: 43°17′50″N 1°50′31″E
- Country: France
- Region: Occitania
- Department: Aude
- Arrondissement: Carcassonne
- Canton: La Piège au Razès

Government
  - Mayor (2020–2026): Thierry Malleville
- Area^{1}: 3.92 km^{2} (1.51 sq mi)
- Elevation: 230 m (750 ft)
- Highest elevation: 313 m (1,027 ft)
- Lowest elevation: 224 m (735 ft)
- Population (2023): 44
  - Density: 11/km^{2} (29/sq mi)
- Time zone: UTC+01:00 (CET)
  - Summer (DST): UTC+02:00 (CEST)
- INSEE/Postal code: 11114 /11410
- ^{1} French Land Register data, which excludes lakes, ponds, glaciers > 1 km^{2} (0.386 sq mi or 247 acres) and river estuaries.

Cumiès (French pronunciation: [kymjɛs]; Occitan: Cumièrs) is a commune in the Aude department in southern France.

== Population ==
Historical population
Year	Pop.	±% p.a.
1968	34	—
1975	36	+0.82%
1982	43	+2.57%
1990	36	−2.20%
1999	40	+1.18%
2007	38	−0.64%
2012	34	−2.20%
2017	36	+1.15%
2023	44	+3.40%
Source: INSEE

== See also ==
- Communes of the Aude department
