= Cambieure =

Commune in Occitanie, France

- Commune
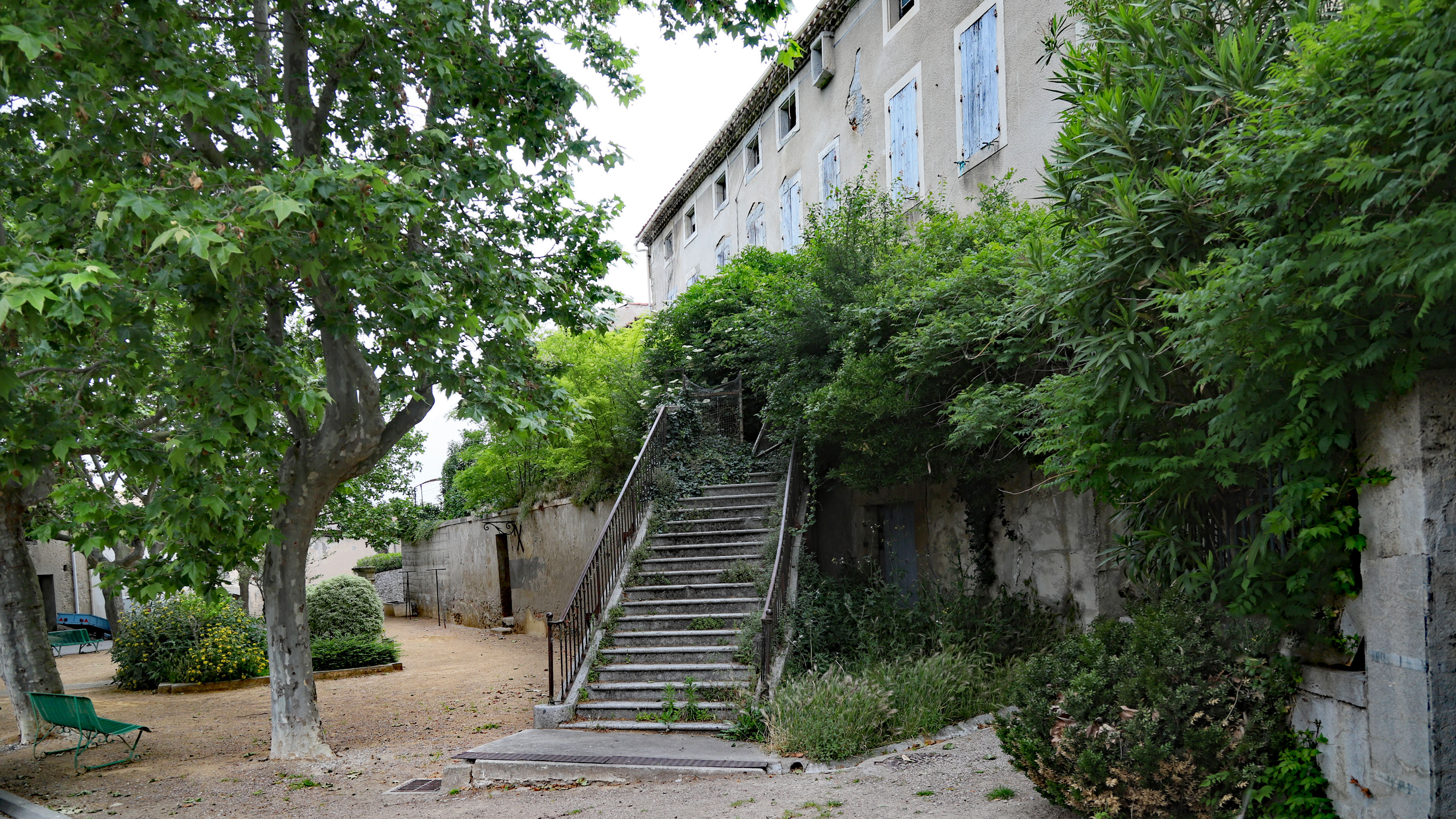
- The village square

- Coat of arms
- Location of Cambieure
- Location within France Location within Occitanie
- Coordinates: 43°07′38″N 2°08′02″E
- Country: France
- Region: Occitania
- Department: Aude
- Arrondissement: Limoux
- Canton: La Piège au Razès

Government
  - Mayor (2020–2026): Pierre Jouy
- Area^{1}: 3.19 km^{2} (1.23 sq mi)
- Highest elevation: 283 m (928 ft)
- Lowest elevation: 188 m (617 ft)
- Population (2023): 327
  - Density: 103/km^{2} (265/sq mi)
- Time zone: UTC+01:00 (CET)
  - Summer (DST): UTC+02:00 (CEST)
- INSEE/Postal code: 11061 /11240
- ^{1} French Land Register data, which excludes lakes, ponds, glaciers > 1 km^{2} (0.386 sq mi or 247 acres) and river estuaries.

Cambieure (French pronunciation: [kɑ̃bjœʁ]; Occitan: Campbiure) is a commune in the Aude department in southern France.

== Population ==
Historical population
Year	Pop.	±% p.a.
1968	160	—
1975	129	−3.03%
1982	147	+1.88%
1990	236	+6.10%
1999	214	−1.08%
2007	234	+1.12%
2012	288	+4.24%
2017	304	+1.09%
2023	327	+1.22%
Source: INSEE

== See also ==
- Communes of the Aude department
