= Laurabuc =

Commune in Occitanie, France

- Commune
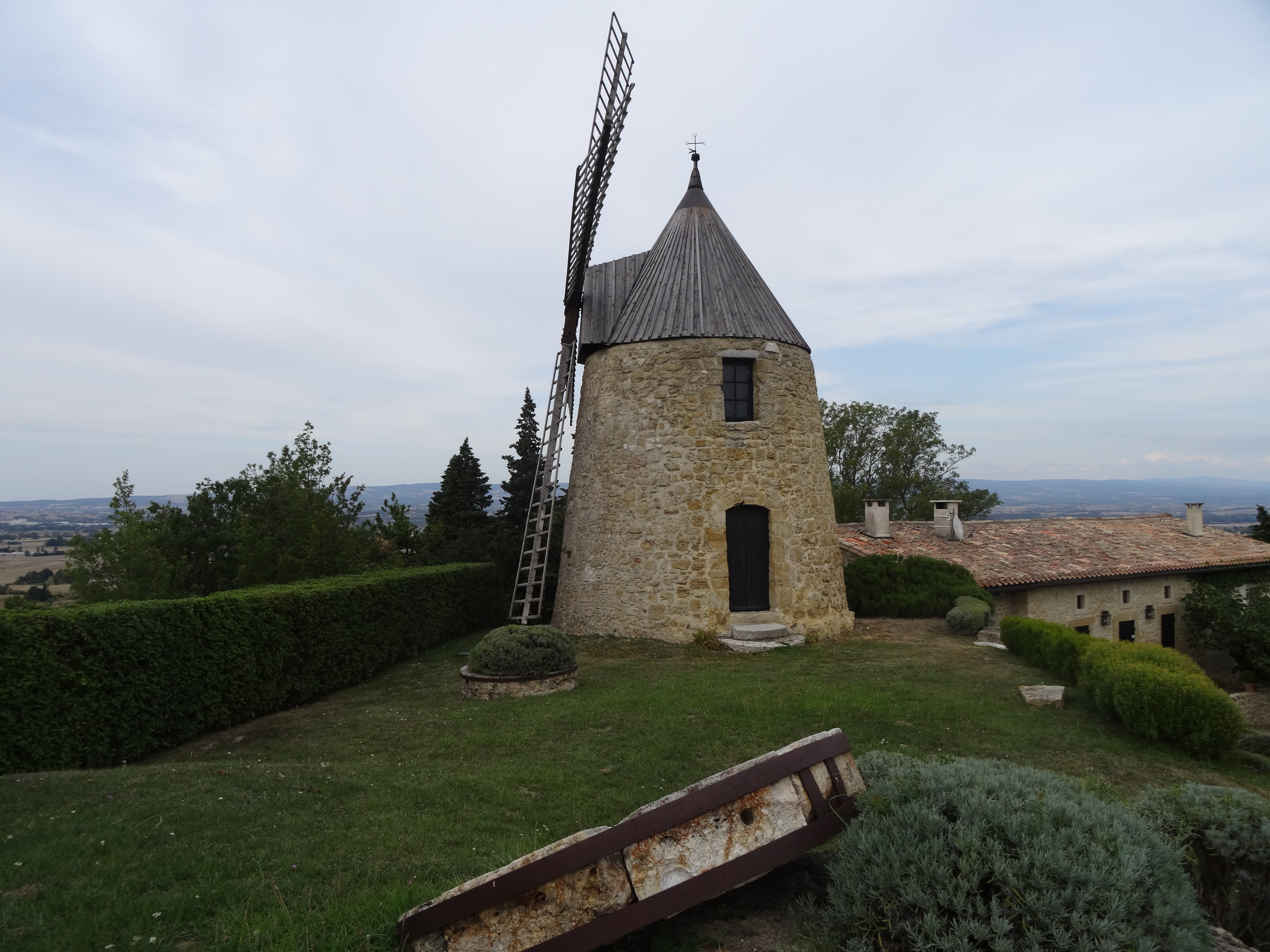
- The windmill in Laurabuc

- Coat of arms
- Location of Laurabuc
- Location within France Location within Occitanie
- Coordinates: 43°14′53″N 1°58′53″E
- Country: France
- Region: Occitania
- Department: Aude
- Arrondissement: Carcassonne
- Canton: La Piège au Razès
- Intercommunality: Castelnaudary Lauragais Audois

Government
  - Mayor (2020–2026): Cedric Lemoine
- Area^{1}: 8.04 km^{2} (3.10 sq mi)
- Elevation: 201 m (659 ft)
- Highest elevation: 231 m (758 ft)
- Lowest elevation: 143 m (469 ft)
- Population (2023): 431
  - Density: 53.6/km^{2} (139/sq mi)
- Time zone: UTC+01:00 (CET)
  - Summer (DST): UTC+02:00 (CEST)
- INSEE/Postal code: 11195 /11400
- ^{1} French Land Register data, which excludes lakes, ponds, glaciers > 1 km^{2} (0.386 sq mi or 247 acres) and river estuaries.

Laurabuc (French pronunciation: [loʁabyk]; Occitan: Laurapuc) is a commune in the Aude department in southern France.

== Population ==
Historical population
Year	Pop.	±% p.a.
1968	249	—
1975	233	−0.94%
1982	235	+0.12%
1990	288	+2.57%
1999	308	+0.75%
2007	379	+2.63%
2012	404	+1.29%
2017	412	+0.39%
2023	431	+0.75%
Source: INSEE

== See also ==
- Communes of the Aude department
