= Cailhavel =

Commune in Occitanie, France

- Commune
- Coat of arms
- Location of Cailhavel
- Location within France Location within Occitanie
- Coordinates: 43°09′47″N 2°07′38″E
- Country: France
- Region: Occitania
- Department: Aude
- Arrondissement: Limoux
- Canton: La Piège au Razès

Government
  - Mayor (2020–2026): Danielle Bonnet
- Area^{1}: 5.34 km^{2} (2.06 sq mi)
- Elevation: 250 m (820 ft)
- Highest elevation: 301 m (988 ft)
- Lowest elevation: 194 m (636 ft)
- Population (2023): 154
  - Density: 28.8/km^{2} (74.7/sq mi)
- Time zone: UTC+01:00 (CET)
  - Summer (DST): UTC+02:00 (CEST)
- INSEE/Postal code: 11059 /11240
- ^{1} French Land Register data, which excludes lakes, ponds, glaciers > 1 km^{2} (0.386 sq mi or 247 acres) and river estuaries.

Cailhavel (French pronunciation: [kajavɛl]; Occitan: Calhavèl) is a commune in the Aude department in southern France.

== Population ==
Historical population
Year	Pop.	±% p.a.
1968	151	—
1975	140	−1.07%
1982	135	−0.52%
1990	129	−0.57%
1999	111	−1.66%
2007	102	−1.05%
2012	111	+1.71%
2017	132	+3.53%
2023	154	+2.60%
Source: INSEE

== See also ==
- Communes of the Aude department
