= La Courtète =

Commune in Occitanie, France

- Commune
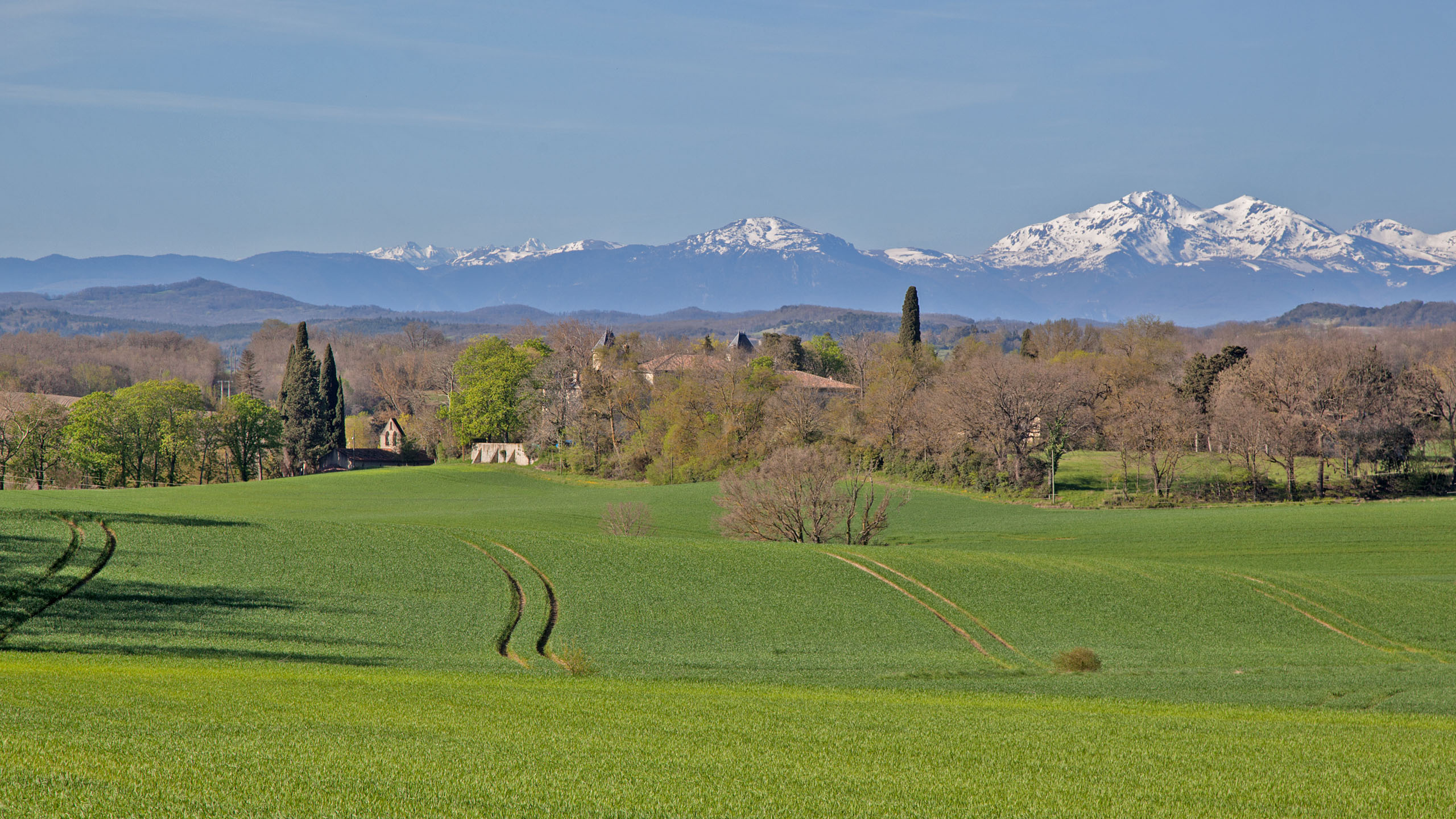
- The north view of La Courtète

- Coat of arms
- Location of La Courtète
- Location within France Location within Occitanie
- Coordinates: 43°08′50″N 2°02′40″E
- Country: France
- Region: Occitania
- Department: Aude
- Arrondissement: Limoux
- Canton: La Piège au Razès

Government
  - Mayor (2020–2026): Lionel d'Uston de Villereglan
- Area^{1}: 5.47 km^{2} (2.11 sq mi)
- Elevation: 260 m (850 ft)
- Highest elevation: 390 m (1,280 ft)
- Lowest elevation: 245 m (804 ft)
- Population (2023): 50
  - Density: 9.1/km^{2} (24/sq mi)
- Time zone: UTC+01:00 (CET)
  - Summer (DST): UTC+02:00 (CEST)
- INSEE/Postal code: 11108 /11240
- ^{1} French Land Register data, which excludes lakes, ponds, glaciers > 1 km^{2} (0.386 sq mi or 247 acres) and river estuaries.

La Courtète (French pronunciation: [kuʁtɛt]; Occitan: La Corteta) is a commune in the Aude department in southern France.

== Population ==
Historical population
Year	Pop.	±% p.a.
1968	62	—
1975	51	−2.75%
1982	60	+2.35%
1990	61	+0.21%
1999	56	−0.95%
2007	46	−2.43%
2012	44	−0.89%
2017	45	+0.45%
2023	50	+1.77%
Source: INSEE

== See also ==
- Communes of the Aude department
