= Generville =

Commune in Occitanie, France

- Commune
- Location of Generville
- Location within France Location within Occitanie
- Coordinates: 43°12′48″N 1°55′59″E
- Country: France
- Region: Occitania
- Department: Aude
- Arrondissement: Carcassonne
- Canton: La Piège au Razès
- Intercommunality: Piège Lauragais Malepère

Government
  - Mayor (2020–2026): Jean Henry Farné
- Area^{1}: 10.21 km^{2} (3.94 sq mi)
- Elevation: 325 m (1,066 ft)
- Highest elevation: 413 m (1,355 ft)
- Lowest elevation: 293 m (961 ft)
- Population (2023): 48
  - Density: 4.7/km^{2} (12/sq mi)
- Time zone: UTC+01:00 (CET)
  - Summer (DST): UTC+02:00 (CEST)
- INSEE/Postal code: 11162 /11270
- ^{1} French Land Register data, which excludes lakes, ponds, glaciers > 1 km^{2} (0.386 sq mi or 247 acres) and river estuaries.

Generville (French pronunciation: [ʒənɛʁvil]; Occitan: Genervila) is a commune in the Aude department in southern France.

== Population ==
Historical population
Year	Pop.	±% p.a.
1968	76	—
1975	56	−4.27%
1982	67	+2.60%
1990	64	−0.57%
1999	64	+0.00%
2007	60	−0.80%
2012	62	+0.66%
2017	60	−0.65%
2023	48	−3.65%
Source: INSEE

== See also ==
- Communes of the Aude department
