= Escueillens-et-Saint-Just-de-Bélengard =

Commune in Occitanie, France

- Commune
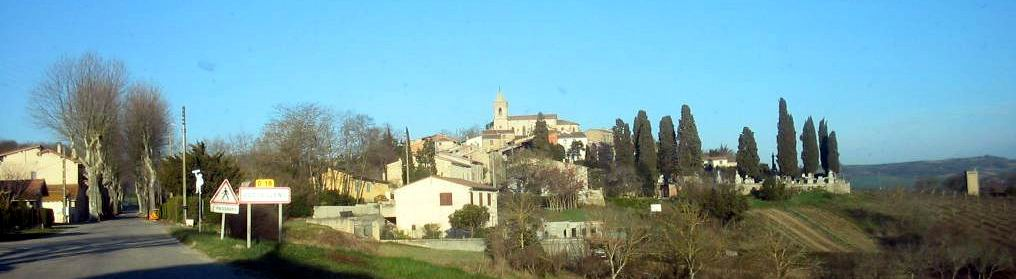
- A general view of Escueillens

- Coat of arms
- Location of Escueillens-et-Saint-Just-de-Bélengard
- Location within France Location within Occitanie
- Coordinates: 43°06′36″N 2°01′15″E
- Country: France
- Region: Occitania
- Department: Aude
- Arrondissement: Limoux
- Canton: La Piège au Razès

Government
  - Mayor (2020–2026): Didier Rieu
- Area^{1}: 11.2 km^{2} (4.3 sq mi)
- Elevation: 328 m (1,076 ft)
- Highest elevation: 520 m (1,710 ft)
- Lowest elevation: 285 m (935 ft)
- Population (2023): 160
  - Density: 14/km^{2} (37/sq mi)
- Time zone: UTC+01:00 (CET)
  - Summer (DST): UTC+02:00 (CEST)
- INSEE/Postal code: 11128 /11240
- ^{1} French Land Register data, which excludes lakes, ponds, glaciers > 1 km^{2} (0.386 sq mi or 247 acres) and river estuaries.

Escueillens-et-Saint-Just-de-Bélengard (French pronunciation: [ɛskœjɛ̃s e sɛ̃ ʒyst də belɑ̃ɡaʁ]; Occitan: Esculhens e Sant Just de Belengard) is a commune in the Aude department in southern France.

== Population ==
Historical population
Year	Pop.	±% p.a.
1968	221	—
1975	168	−3.84%
1982	158	−0.87%
1990	140	−1.50%
1999	140	+0.00%
2007	178	+3.05%
2012	177	−0.11%
2017	156	−2.49%
2023	160	+0.42%
Source: INSEE

== See also ==
- Communes of the Aude department
