= La Louvière-Lauragais =

Commune in Occitanie, France

- Commune
- Coat of arms
- Location of La Louvière-Lauragais
- Location within France Location within Occitanie
- Coordinates: 43°15′51″N 1°45′07″E
- Country: France
- Region: Occitania
- Department: Aude
- Arrondissement: Carcassonne
- Canton: La Piège au Razès

Government
  - Mayor (2020–2026): Charles Pauly
- Area^{1}: 6.25 km^{2} (2.41 sq mi)
- Elevation: 339 m (1,112 ft)
- Highest elevation: 342 m (1,122 ft)
- Lowest elevation: 235 m (771 ft)
- Population (2023): 80
  - Density: 13/km^{2} (33/sq mi)
- Time zone: UTC+01:00 (CET)
  - Summer (DST): UTC+02:00 (CEST)
- INSEE/Postal code: 11208 /11410
- ^{1} French Land Register data, which excludes lakes, ponds, glaciers > 1 km^{2} (0.386 sq mi or 247 acres) and river estuaries.

La Louvière-Lauragais (French pronunciation: [la luvjɛʁ loʁaɡɛ]; Occitan: La Lobièra Lauragués) is a commune in the Aude department in southern France.

== Population ==
Historical population
Year	Pop.	±% p.a.
1968	136	—
1975	95	−5.00%
1982	93	−0.30%
1990	83	−1.41%
1999	79	−0.55%
2007	91	+1.78%
2012	78	−3.04%
2017	77	−0.26%
2023	80	+0.64%
Source: INSEE

== See also ==
- Communes of the Aude department
