= Pexiora =

Commune in Occitanie, France

- Commune
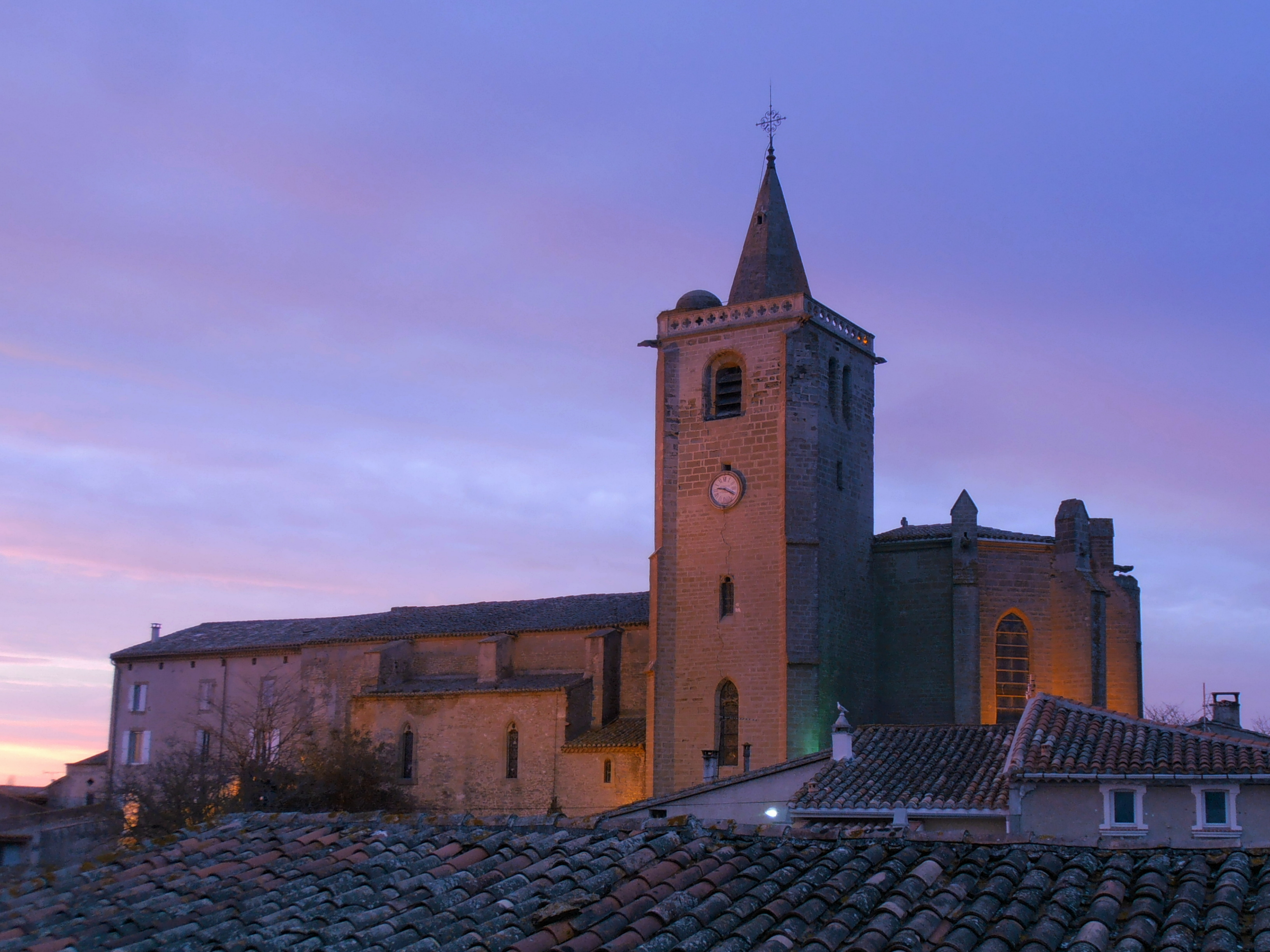
- The church in Pexiora

- Coat of arms
- Location of Pexiora
- Location within France Location within Occitanie
- Coordinates: 43°16′09″N 2°02′15″E
- Country: France
- Region: Occitania
- Department: Aude
- Arrondissement: Carcassonne
- Canton: La Piège au Razès

Government
  - Mayor (2020–2026): Serge Cazenave
- Area^{1}: 13.16 km^{2} (5.08 sq mi)
- Elevation: 142 m (466 ft)
- Highest elevation: 160 m (520 ft)
- Lowest elevation: 130 m (430 ft)
- Population (2023): 1,266
  - Density: 96.20/km^{2} (249.2/sq mi)
- Time zone: UTC+01:00 (CET)
  - Summer (DST): UTC+02:00 (CEST)
- INSEE/Postal code: 11281 /11150
- ^{1} French Land Register data, which excludes lakes, ponds, glaciers > 1 km^{2} (0.386 sq mi or 247 acres) and river estuaries.

Pexiora (French pronunciation: [pɛksjɔʁa]; Occitan: Puègsiuran) is a commune in the Aude department in southern France.

== Population ==
Historical population
Year	Pop.	±% p.a.
1968	854	—
1975	753	−1.78%
1982	751	−0.04%
1990	709	−0.72%
1999	814	+1.55%
2007	992	+2.50%
2012	1,289	+5.38%
2017	1,226	−1.00%
2023	1,266	+0.54%
Source: INSEE

== See also ==
- Communes of the Aude department
