= Canton of La Piège au Razès =

Coordinates: 43.24°N 2.11°E

- Canton
- Situation of the canton of La Piège au Razès in the department of Aude
- Country: France
- Region: Occitania
- Department: Aude
- No. of communes: {{{nbcomm}}}
- Population (2023): 20,541
- INSEE code: 1101

The canton of La Piège au Razès is an administrative division of the Aude department, southern France. It was created at the French canton reorganisation which came into effect in March 2015. Its seat is in Bram.

It consists of the following communes:

1. Alaigne
2. Baraigne
3. Belflou
4. Bellegarde-du-Razès
5. Belpech
6. Belvèze-du-Razès
7. Bram
8. Brézilhac
9. Brugairolles
10. Cahuzac
11. Cailhau
12. Cailhavel
13. Cambieure
14. La Cassaigne
15. Cazalrenoux
16. La Courtète
17. Cumiès
18. Donazac
19. Escueillens-et-Saint-Just-de-Bélengard
20. Fajac-la-Relenque
21. Fanjeaux
22. Fenouillet-du-Razès
23. Ferran
24. Fonters-du-Razès
25. La Force
26. Gaja-la-Selve
27. Generville
28. Gourvieille
29. Gramazie
30. Hounoux
31. Lafage
32. Lasserre-de-Prouille
33. Laurabuc
34. Laurac
35. Lauraguel
36. Lignairolles
37. La Louvière-Lauragais
38. Malviès
39. Marquein
40. Mayreville
41. Mazerolles-du-Razès
42. Mézerville
43. Mireval-Lauragais
44. Molandier
45. Molleville
46. Montauriol
47. Montgradail
48. Monthaut
49. Orsans
50. Payra-sur-l'Hers
51. Pech-Luna
52. Pécharic-et-le-Py
53. Pexiora
54. Peyrefitte-sur-l'Hers
55. Plaigne
56. Plavilla
57. Pomy
58. Ribouisse
59. Routier
60. Saint-Amans
61. Sainte-Camelle
62. Saint-Gaudéric
63. Saint-Julien-de-Briola
64. Saint-Michel-de-Lanès
65. Saint-Sernin
66. Salles-sur-l'Hers
67. Seignalens
68. Villarzel-du-Razès
69. Villasavary
70. Villautou
71. Villepinte
72. Villesiscle
