= Brugairolles =

Commune in Occitanie, France

- Commune
- Coat of arms
- Location of Brugairolles
- Location within France Location within Occitanie
- Coordinates: 43°07′32″N 2°09′33″E
- Country: France
- Region: Occitania
- Department: Aude
- Arrondissement: Limoux
- Canton: La Piège au Razès

Government
  - Mayor (2020–2026): Simon Sire
- Area^{1}: 8.47 km^{2} (3.27 sq mi)
- Elevation: 183 m (600 ft)
- Highest elevation: 386 m (1,266 ft)
- Lowest elevation: 184 m (604 ft)
- Population (2023): 308
  - Density: 36.4/km^{2} (94.2/sq mi)
- Time zone: UTC+01:00 (CET)
  - Summer (DST): UTC+02:00 (CEST)
- INSEE/Postal code: 11053 /11300
- ^{1} French Land Register data, which excludes lakes, ponds, glaciers > 1 km^{2} (0.386 sq mi or 247 acres) and river estuaries.

Brugairolles (French pronunciation: [bʁyɡɛʁɔl]; Occitan: Brugairòlas) is a commune in the Aude department in southern France.

== Population ==
Historical population
Year	Pop.	±% p.a.
1968	267	—
1975	221	−2.67%
1982	199	−1.49%
1990	207	+0.49%
1999	196	−0.60%
2007	242	+2.67%
2012	258	+1.29%
2017	273	+1.14%
2023	308	+2.03%
Source: INSEE

== See also ==
- Communes of the Aude department
