= Monthaut =

Commune in Occitanie, France

- Commune
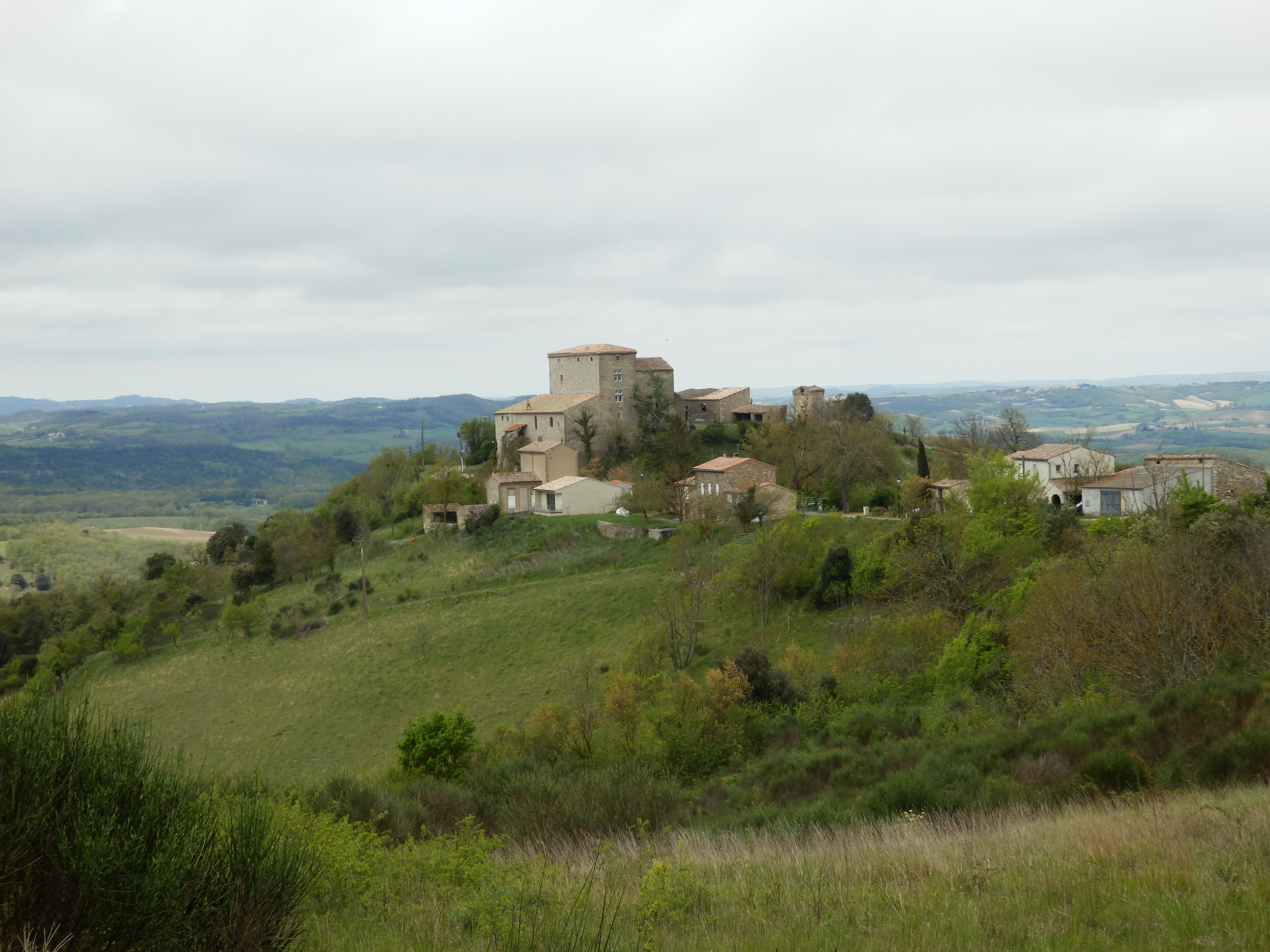
- A general view of Monthaut

- Coat of arms
- Location of Monthaut
- Location within France Location within Occitanie
- Coordinates: 43°04′41″N 2°03′46″E
- Country: France
- Region: Occitania
- Department: Aude
- Arrondissement: Limoux
- Canton: La Piège au Razès

Government
  - Mayor (2020–2026): Claude Marty
- Area^{1}: 7.01 km^{2} (2.71 sq mi)
- Elevation: 526 m (1,726 ft)
- Highest elevation: 551 m (1,808 ft)
- Lowest elevation: 279 m (915 ft)
- Population (2023): 37
  - Density: 5.3/km^{2} (14/sq mi)
- Time zone: UTC+01:00 (CET)
  - Summer (DST): UTC+02:00 (CEST)
- INSEE/Postal code: 11247 /11240
- ^{1} French Land Register data, which excludes lakes, ponds, glaciers > 1 km^{2} (0.386 sq mi or 247 acres) and river estuaries.

Monthaut is a commune in the Aude department in southern France.

== Population ==
Historical population
| Year | Pop. | ±% p.a. |
|---|---|---|
| 1968 | 43 | — |
| 1975 | 39 | −1.39% |
| 1982 | 31 | −3.23% |
| 1990 | 35 | +1.53% |
| 1999 | 42 | +2.05% |
| 2007 | 46 | +1.14% |
| 2012 | 42 | −1.80% |
| 2017 | 38 | −1.98% |
| 2023 | 37 | −0.44% |
Source: INSEE

== See also ==
- Communes of the Aude department
