= Hounoux =

Commune in Occitanie, France

- Commune
- Coat of arms
- Location of Hounoux
- Location within France Location within Occitanie
- Coordinates: 43°07′47″N 2°00′05″E
- Country: France
- Region: Occitania
- Department: Aude
- Arrondissement: Carcassonne
- Canton: La Piège au Razès

Government
  - Mayor (2020–2026): Paul Painco
- Area^{1}: 7.62 km^{2} (2.94 sq mi)
- Elevation: 370 m (1,210 ft)
- Highest elevation: 420 m (1,380 ft)
- Lowest elevation: 270 m (890 ft)
- Population (2023): 135
  - Density: 17.7/km^{2} (45.9/sq mi)
- Time zone: UTC+01:00 (CET)
  - Summer (DST): UTC+02:00 (CEST)
- INSEE/Postal code: 11173 /11240
- ^{1} French Land Register data, which excludes lakes, ponds, glaciers > 1 km^{2} (0.386 sq mi or 247 acres) and river estuaries.

Hounoux (French pronunciation: [unu]; Occitan: Onós) is a commune in the Aude department in southern France.

== Population ==
Historical population
Year	Pop.	±% p.a.
1968	137	—
1975	125	−1.30%
1982	108	−2.07%
1990	106	−0.23%
1999	101	−0.54%
2007	127	+2.90%
2012	144	+2.54%
2017	136	−1.14%
2023	135	−0.12%
Source: INSEE

== See also ==
- Communes of the Aude department
