= Villesiscle =

Commune in Occitanie, France

- Commune
- Location of Villesiscle
- Location within France Location within Occitanie
- Coordinates: 43°13′44″N 2°05′40″E
- Country: France
- Region: Occitania
- Department: Aude
- Arrondissement: Carcassonne
- Canton: La Piège au Razès
- Intercommunality: Piège Lauragais Malepère

Government
  - Mayor (2020–2026): Rachel Stremler
- Area^{1}: 5.46 km^{2} (2.11 sq mi)
- Elevation: 162 m (531 ft)
- Highest elevation: 193 m (633 ft)
- Lowest elevation: 137 m (449 ft)
- Population (2023): 362
  - Density: 66.3/km^{2} (172/sq mi)
- Time zone: UTC+01:00 (CET)
  - Summer (DST): UTC+02:00 (CEST)
- INSEE/Postal code: 11438 /11150
- ^{1} French Land Register data, which excludes lakes, ponds, glaciers > 1 km^{2} (0.386 sq mi or 247 acres) and river estuaries.

Villesiscle (French pronunciation: [vilsiskl]; Occitan: La Mòta) is a commune in the Aude department in southern France.

== Population ==
Historical population
Year	Pop.	±% p.a.
1968	247	—
1975	183	−4.19%
1982	217	+2.46%
1990	267	+2.63%
1999	280	+0.53%
2007	323	+1.80%
2012	369	+2.70%
2017	383	+0.75%
2023	362	−0.94%
Source: INSEE

== See also ==
- Communes of the Aude department
