= Saint-Amans, Aude =

Commune in Occitanie, France

Saint-Amans
- Commune
- Coat of arms
- Location of Saint-Amans
- Location within France Location within Occitanie
- Coordinates: 43°13′40″N 1°53′14″E
- Country: France
- Region: Occitania
- Department: Aude
- Arrondissement: Carcassonne
- Canton: La Piège au Razès

Government
  - Mayor (2020–2026): Michel Galant
- Area^{1}: 8.16 km^{2} (3.15 sq mi)
- Elevation: 285 m (935 ft)
- Highest elevation: 376 m (1,234 ft)
- Lowest elevation: 258 m (846 ft)
- Population (2023): 63
  - Density: 7.7/km^{2} (20/sq mi)
- Time zone: UTC+01:00 (CET)
  - Summer (DST): UTC+02:00 (CEST)
- INSEE/Postal code: 11331 /11270
- ^{1} French Land Register data, which excludes lakes, ponds, glaciers > 1 km^{2} (0.386 sq mi or 247 acres) and river estuaries.

Saint-Amans (French pronunciation: [sɛ̃t‿amɑ̃]; Languedocien: Sant Amanç) is a commune in the Aude department in southern France.

== Population ==
Historical population
Year	Pop.	±% p.a.
1968	75	—
1975	69	−1.18%
1982	58	−2.45%
1990	81	+4.26%
1999	74	−1.00%
2007	63	−1.99%
2012	64	+0.32%
2017	64	+0.00%
2023	63	−0.26%
Source: INSEE

== See also ==
- Communes of the Aude department
