= Cahuzac, Aude =

Commune in Occitanie, France

Cahuzac
- Commune
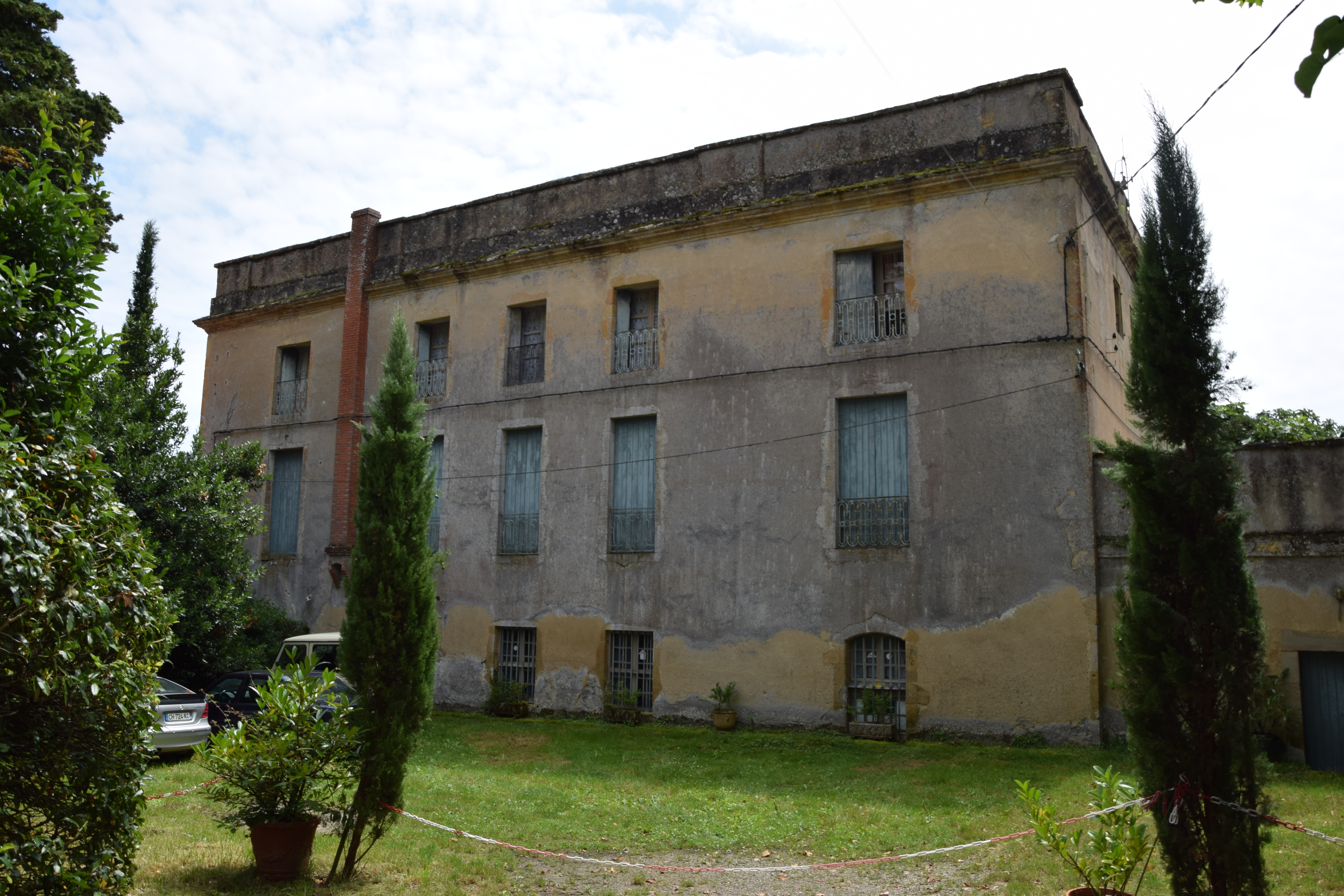
- The chateau in Cahuzac

- Coat of arms
- Location of Cahuzac
- Location within France Location within Occitanie
- Coordinates: 43°11′35″N 1°51′04″E
- Country: France
- Region: Occitania
- Department: Aude
- Arrondissement: Carcassonne
- Canton: La Piège au Razès

Government
  - Mayor (2020–2026): Didier Mattia
- Area^{1}: 3.04 km^{2} (1.17 sq mi)
- Elevation: 342 m (1,122 ft)
- Highest elevation: 361 m (1,184 ft)
- Lowest elevation: 266 m (873 ft)
- Population (2023): 33
  - Density: 11/km^{2} (28/sq mi)
- Time zone: UTC+01:00 (CET)
  - Summer (DST): UTC+02:00 (CEST)
- INSEE/Postal code: 11057 /11420
- ^{1} French Land Register data, which excludes lakes, ponds, glaciers > 1 km^{2} (0.386 sq mi or 247 acres) and river estuaries.

Cahuzac (French pronunciation: [ka.yzak]; Occitan: Causac) is a commune in the Aude department in southern France.

== Population ==
Historical population
Year	Pop.	±% p.a.
1968	46	—
1975	32	−5.05%
1982	29	−1.40%
1990	32	+1.24%
1999	38	+1.93%
2007	34	−1.38%
2012	34	+0.00%
2017	32	−1.21%
2023	33	+0.51%
Source: INSEE

== See also ==
- Communes of the Aude department
