= Cazalrenoux =

Commune in Occitanie, France

- Commune
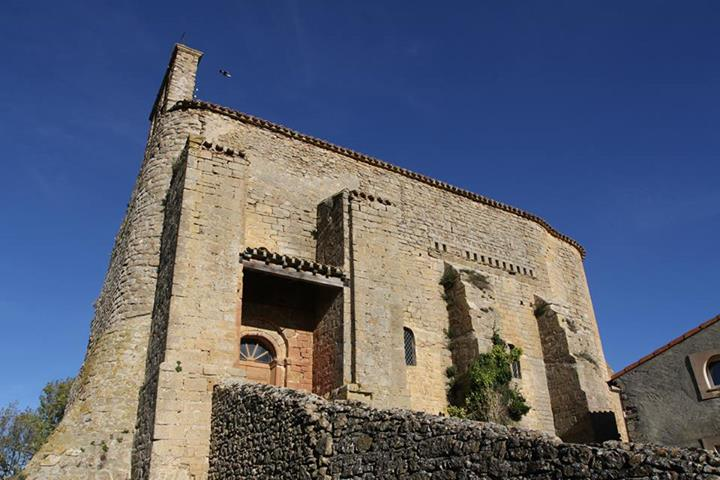
- The church in Cazalrenoux

- Coat of arms
- Location of Cazalrenoux
- Location within France Location within Occitanie
- Coordinates: 43°11′59″N 1°57′01″E
- Country: France
- Region: Occitania
- Department: Aude
- Arrondissement: Carcassonne
- Canton: La Piège au Razès

Government
  - Mayor (2020–2026): Brice Asensio
- Area^{1}: 13.35 km^{2} (5.15 sq mi)
- Elevation: 300 m (980 ft)
- Highest elevation: 410 m (1,350 ft)
- Lowest elevation: 285 m (935 ft)
- Population (2023): 105
  - Density: 7.87/km^{2} (20.4/sq mi)
- Time zone: UTC+01:00 (CET)
  - Summer (DST): UTC+02:00 (CEST)
- INSEE/Postal code: 11087 /11270
- ^{1} French Land Register data, which excludes lakes, ponds, glaciers > 1 km^{2} (0.386 sq mi or 247 acres) and river estuaries.

Cazalrenoux (French pronunciation: [kazalʁənu]; Occitan: Casalrenos) is a commune in the Aude department in southern France.

== Population ==
Historical population
Year	Pop.	±% p.a.
1968	92	—
1975	73	−3.25%
1982	78	+0.95%
1990	70	−1.34%
1999	84	+2.05%
2007	76	−1.24%
2012	81	+1.28%
2017	91	+2.36%
2023	105	+2.41%
Source: INSEE

== See also ==
- Communes of the Aude department
