= Pech-Luna =

Commune in Occitanie, France

- Commune
- Coat of arms
- Location of Pech-Luna
- Location within France Location within Occitanie
- Coordinates: 43°13′03″N 1°50′37″E
- Country: France
- Region: Occitania
- Department: Aude
- Arrondissement: Carcassonne
- Canton: La Piège au Razès
- Intercommunality: Piège Lauragais Malepère

Government
  - Mayor (2020–2026): Regis Bruty
- Area^{1}: 6.57 km^{2} (2.54 sq mi)
- Elevation: 310 m (1,020 ft)
- Highest elevation: 360 m (1,180 ft)
- Lowest elevation: 279 m (915 ft)
- Population (2023): 76
  - Density: 12/km^{2} (30/sq mi)
- Time zone: UTC+01:00 (CET)
  - Summer (DST): UTC+02:00 (CEST)
- INSEE/Postal code: 11278 /11420
- ^{1} French Land Register data, which excludes lakes, ponds, glaciers > 1 km^{2} (0.386 sq mi or 247 acres) and river estuaries.

Pech-Luna (French pronunciation: [pɛʃ lyna]; Occitan: Puèglunan) is a commune in the Aude department in southern France.

== Population ==
Historical population
Year	Pop.	±% p.a.
1968	114	—
1975	99	−2.00%
1982	112	+1.78%
1990	93	−2.30%
1999	80	−1.66%
2007	97	+2.44%
2012	100	+0.61%
2017	75	−5.59%
2023	76	+0.22%
Source: INSEE

== See also ==
- Communes of the Aude department
