= La Cassaigne =

Commune in Occitanie, France

- Commune
- Coat of arms
- Location of La Cassaigne
- Location within France Location within Occitanie
- Coordinates: 43°12′13″N 1°59′40″E
- Country: France
- Region: Occitania
- Department: Aude
- Arrondissement: Carcassonne
- Canton: La Piège au Razès

Government
  - Mayor (2020–2026): Benjamin Peyras
- Area^{1}: 12.13 km^{2} (4.68 sq mi)
- Elevation: 253 m (830 ft)
- Highest elevation: 410 m (1,350 ft)
- Lowest elevation: 209 m (686 ft)
- Population (2023): 200
  - Density: 16/km^{2} (43/sq mi)
- Time zone: UTC+01:00 (CET)
  - Summer (DST): UTC+02:00 (CEST)
- INSEE/Postal code: 11072 /11270
- ^{1} French Land Register data, which excludes lakes, ponds, glaciers > 1 km^{2} (0.386 sq mi or 247 acres) and river estuaries.

La Cassaigne (French pronunciation: [la kasɛɲ]; Occitan: La Cassanha) is a commune in the Aude department in southern France. It lies 749 km (465 mi) south of Paris.

== Population ==
Historical population
Year	Pop.	±% p.a.
1968	203	—
1975	182	−1.55%
1982	171	−0.89%
1990	158	−0.98%
1999	183	+1.65%
2007	189	+0.40%
2012	212	+2.32%
2017	169	−4.43%
2023	200	+2.85%
Source: INSEE

== See also ==
- Communes of the Aude department
