= Marquein =

Commune in Occitanie, France

- Commune
- Coat of arms
- Location of Marquein
- Location within France Location within Occitanie
- Coordinates: 43°18′22″N 1°43′38″E
- Country: France
- Region: Occitania
- Department: Aude
- Arrondissement: Carcassonne
- Canton: La Piège au Razès

Government
  - Mayor (2020–2026): Dominique Dublois
- Area^{1}: 5.49 km^{2} (2.12 sq mi)
- Elevation: 250 m (820 ft)
- Highest elevation: 311 m (1,020 ft)
- Lowest elevation: 210 m (690 ft)
- Population (2023): 78
  - Density: 14/km^{2} (37/sq mi)
- Time zone: UTC+01:00 (CET)
  - Summer (DST): UTC+02:00 (CEST)
- INSEE/Postal code: 11218 /11410
- ^{1} French Land Register data, which excludes lakes, ponds, glaciers > 1 km^{2} (0.386 sq mi or 247 acres) and river estuaries.

Marquein (French pronunciation: [maʁkɛ̃]; Occitan: Marquènh) is a commune in the Aude department in southern France.

== Population ==
Historical population
Year	Pop.	±% p.a.
1968	85	—
1975	53	−6.53%
1982	42	−3.27%
1990	42	+0.00%
1999	59	+3.85%
2007	73	+2.70%
2012	76	+0.81%
2017	82	+1.53%
2023	78	−0.83%
Source: INSEE

== See also ==
- Communes of the Aude department
