= Mézerville =

Commune in Occitanie, France

- Commune
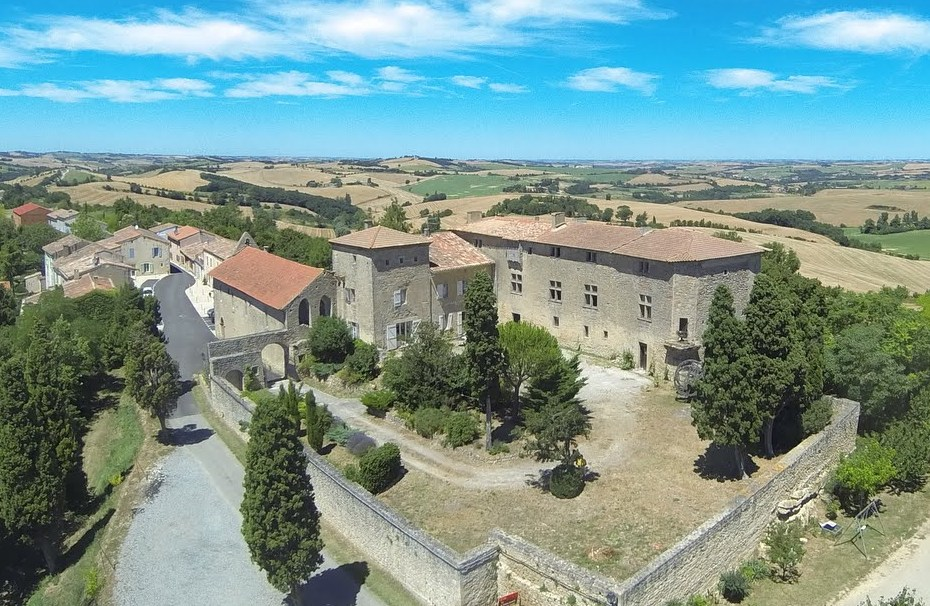
- The chateau and surroundings in Mézerville

- Coat of arms
- Location of Mézerville
- Location within France Location within Occitanie
- Coordinates: 43°15′39″N 1°47′33″E
- Country: France
- Region: Occitania
- Department: Aude
- Arrondissement: Carcassonne
- Canton: La Piège au Razès

Government
  - Mayor (2020–2026): Marc Tardieu
- Area^{1}: 7.3 km^{2} (2.8 sq mi)
- Elevation: 330 m (1,080 ft)
- Highest elevation: 360 m (1,180 ft)
- Lowest elevation: 251 m (823 ft)
- Population (2023): 96
  - Density: 13/km^{2} (34/sq mi)
- Time zone: UTC+01:00 (CET)
  - Summer (DST): UTC+02:00 (CEST)
- INSEE/Postal code: 11231 /11410
- ^{1} French Land Register data, which excludes lakes, ponds, glaciers > 1 km^{2} (0.386 sq mi or 247 acres) and river estuaries.

Mézerville (French pronunciation: [mezɛʁvil]) is a commune in the Aude department in southern France.

== Population ==
Historical population
Year	Pop.	±% p.a.
1968	87	—
1975	84	−0.50%
1982	87	+0.50%
1990	70	−2.68%
1999	81	+1.63%
2007	101	+2.80%
2012	83	−3.85%
2017	95	+2.74%
2023	96	+0.17%
Source: INSEE

== See also ==
- Communes of the Aude department
