= Lignairolles =

Commune in Occitanie, France

- Commune
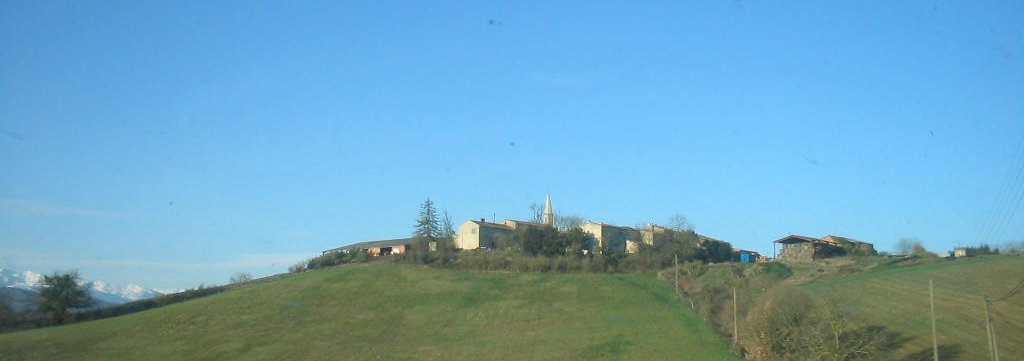
- A general view of Lignairolles

- Coat of arms
- Location of Lignairolles
- Location within France Location within Occitanie
- Coordinates: 43°05′54″N 1°59′41″E
- Country: France
- Region: Occitania
- Department: Aude
- Arrondissement: Limoux
- Canton: La Piège au Razès
- Intercommunality: Limouxin

Government
  - Mayor (2020–2026): Henri Tisseyre
- Area^{1}: 7.31 km^{2} (2.82 sq mi)
- Elevation: 352 m (1,155 ft)
- Highest elevation: 450 m (1,480 ft)
- Lowest elevation: 324 m (1,063 ft)
- Population (2023): 33
  - Density: 4.5/km^{2} (12/sq mi)
- Demonym(s): Lignairollois, Lignairolloises
- Time zone: UTC+01:00 (CET)
  - Summer (DST): UTC+02:00 (CEST)
- INSEE/Postal code: 11204 /11240
- ^{1} French Land Register data, which excludes lakes, ponds, glaciers > 1 km^{2} (0.386 sq mi or 247 acres) and river estuaries.

Lignairolles (French pronunciation: [liɲɛʁɔl]; Occitan: Linhairòlas) is a commune in the Aude department in southern France.

== Population ==
Historical population
Year	Pop.	±% p.a.
1968	59	—
1975	64	+1.17%
1982	51	−3.19%
1990	35	−4.60%
1999	30	−1.70%
2007	37	+2.66%
2012	36	−0.55%
2017	43	+3.62%
2023	33	−4.32%
Source: INSEE

== See also ==
- Communes of the Aude department
