= Lauraguel =

Commune in Occitanie, France

- Commune
- Coat of arms
- Location of Lauraguel
- Location within France Location within Occitanie
- Coordinates: 43°05′58″N 2°10′31″E
- Country: France
- Region: Occitania
- Department: Aude
- Arrondissement: Limoux
- Canton: La Piège au Razès

Government
  - Mayor (2020–2026): Joël Cathala
- Area^{1}: 7.01 km^{2} (2.71 sq mi)
- Elevation: 185 m (607 ft)
- Highest elevation: 286 m (938 ft)
- Lowest elevation: 166 m (545 ft)
- Population (2023): 622
  - Density: 88.7/km^{2} (230/sq mi)
- Time zone: UTC+01:00 (CET)
  - Summer (DST): UTC+02:00 (CEST)
- INSEE/Postal code: 11197 /11300
- ^{1} French Land Register data, which excludes lakes, ponds, glaciers > 1 km^{2} (0.386 sq mi or 247 acres) and river estuaries.

Lauraguel (French pronunciation: [loʁaɡɛl]; Languedocien: Lauraguèl) is a commune in the Aude department in southern France.

== Population ==
Historical population
Year	Pop.	±% p.a.
1968	404	—
1975	368	−1.32%
1982	431	+2.28%
1990	416	−0.44%
1999	461	+1.15%
2007	515	+1.39%
2012	644	+4.57%
2017	609	−1.11%
2023	622	+0.35%
Source: INSEE

== See also ==
- Communes of the Aude department
