= Orsans, Aude =

Commune in Occitanie, France

Orsans
- Commune
- Location of Orsans
- Location within France Location within Occitanie
- Coordinates: 43°09′44″N 1°58′59″E
- Country: France
- Region: Occitania
- Department: Aude
- Arrondissement: Carcassonne
- Canton: La Piège au Razès

Government
  - Mayor (2020–2026): Jean Bonnafil
- Area^{1}: 9.94 km^{2} (3.84 sq mi)
- Elevation: 355 m (1,165 ft)
- Highest elevation: 400 m (1,300 ft)
- Lowest elevation: 304 m (997 ft)
- Population (2023): 87
  - Density: 8.8/km^{2} (23/sq mi)
- Time zone: UTC+01:00 (CET)
  - Summer (DST): UTC+02:00 (CEST)
- INSEE/Postal code: 11268 /11270
- ^{1} French Land Register data, which excludes lakes, ponds, glaciers > 1 km^{2} (0.386 sq mi or 247 acres) and river estuaries.

Orsans is a commune in the Aude department in southern France.

Orsans is a small hamlet in the south of France, it used to be an important village with a school and many farming supplies, but now is just a small farming community. There is a medieval church and there used to be a large windmill on the hill, which is now gone; however, the storage house (which was also a cowshed for a while) remains, now converted into a house. There is a statue in the square which celebrates the ceased or injured form Orsans in World War I. A small stream runs through the hills that are used for farming. On top of the largest hill in or sans there is a large old water tower, that is surrounded by cows.

== Population ==
Historical population
Year	Pop.	±% p.a.
1968	141	—
1975	93	−5.77%
1982	93	+0.00%
1990	76	−2.49%
1999	101	+3.21%
2007	90	−1.43%
2012	95	+1.09%
2017	104	+1.83%
2023	87	−2.93%
Source: INSEE

== See also ==
- Communes of the Aude department
