= Montauriol, Aude =

Commune in Occitanie, France

Montauriol
- Commune
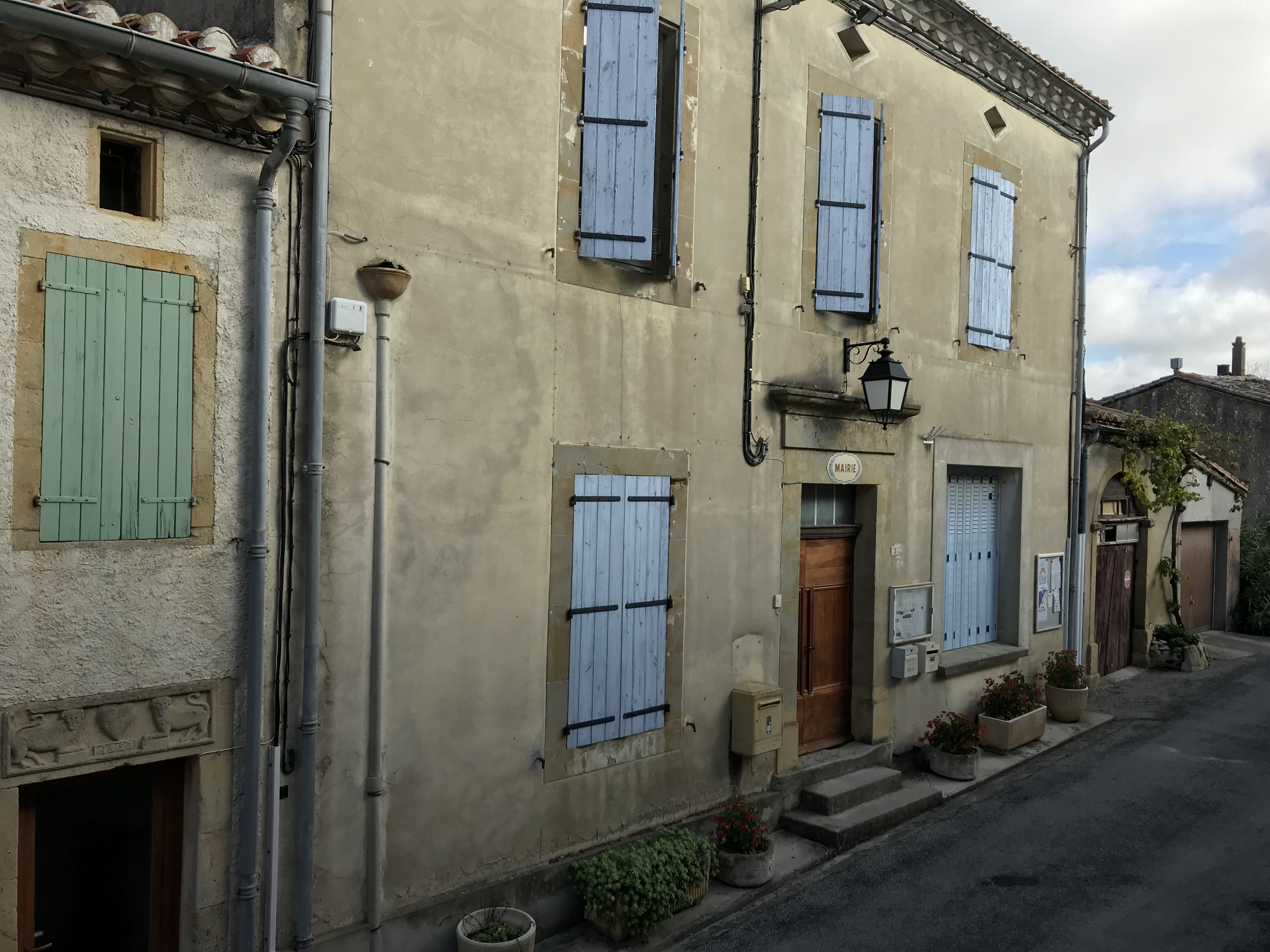
- The town hall in Montauriol

- Coat of arms
- Location of Montauriol
- Location within France Location within Occitanie
- Coordinates: 43°16′43″N 1°50′11″E
- Country: France
- Region: Occitania
- Department: Aude
- Arrondissement: Carcassonne
- Canton: La Piège au Razès

Government
  - Mayor (2020–2026): Alain Carbon
- Area^{1}: 8.47 km^{2} (3.27 sq mi)
- Elevation: 252 m (827 ft)
- Highest elevation: 313 m (1,027 ft)
- Lowest elevation: 225 m (738 ft)
- Population (2023): 85
  - Density: 10/km^{2} (26/sq mi)
- Time zone: UTC+01:00 (CET)
  - Summer (DST): UTC+02:00 (CEST)
- INSEE/Postal code: 11239 /11410
- ^{1} French Land Register data, which excludes lakes, ponds, glaciers > 1 km^{2} (0.386 sq mi or 247 acres) and river estuaries.

Montauriol (French pronunciation: [mɔ̃toʁjɔl]; Occitan: Montauriòl) is a commune in the Aude department in southern France.

== Population ==
Historical population
Year	Pop.	±% p.a.
1968	93	—
1975	74	−3.21%
1982	74	+0.00%
1990	75	+0.17%
1999	74	−0.15%
2007	79	+0.82%
2012	78	−0.25%
2017	88	+2.44%
2023	85	−0.58%
Source: INSEE

== See also ==
- Communes of the Aude department
