= Aunat =

Commune in Occitanie, France

- Commune
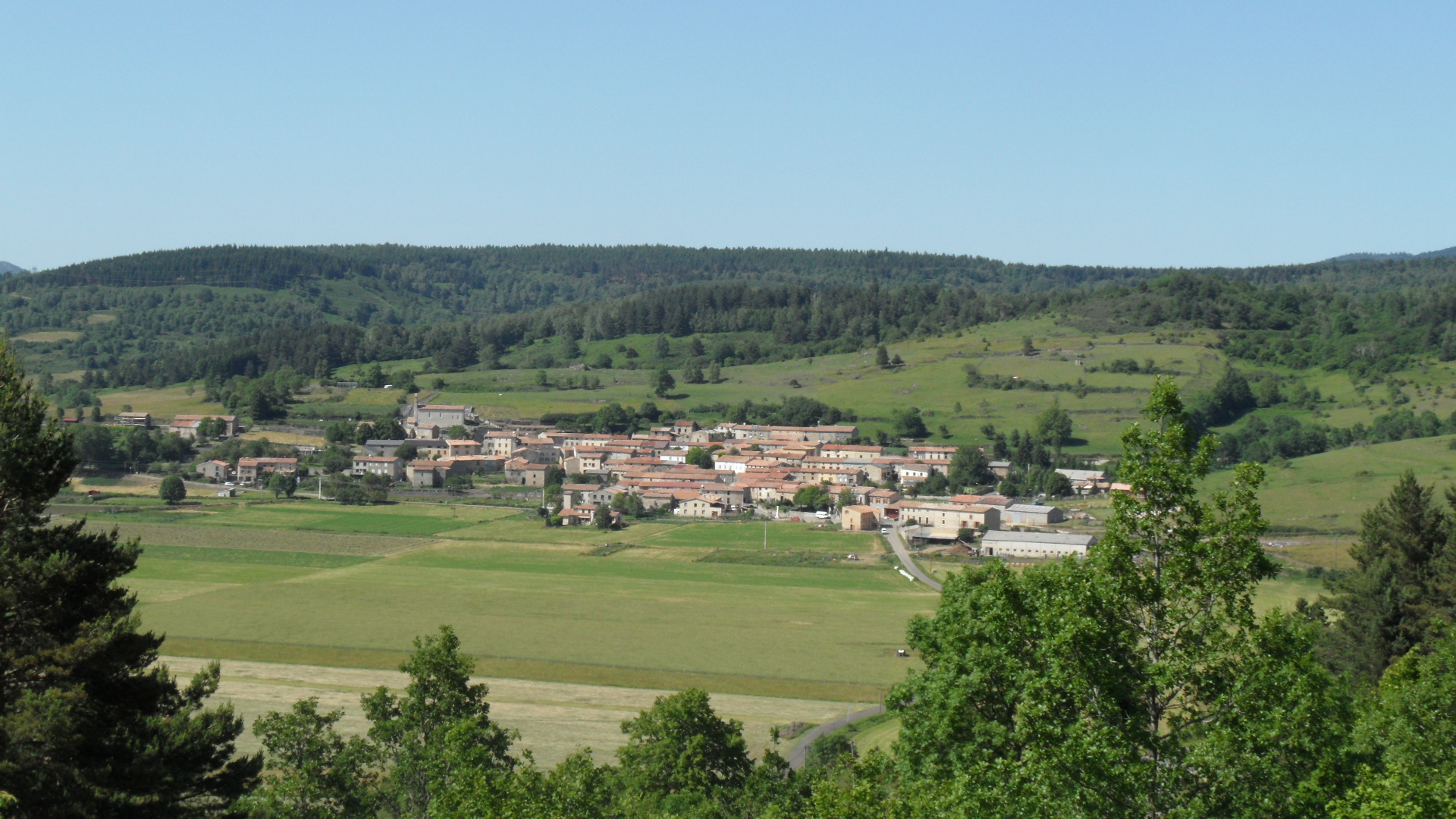
- A general view of Aunat

- Coat of arms
- Location of Aunat
- Location within France Location within Occitanie
- Coordinates: 42°47′41″N 2°05′46″E
- Country: France
- Region: Occitania
- Department: Aude
- Arrondissement: Limoux
- Canton: La Haute-Vallée de l'Aude
- Intercommunality: CC Pyrénées Audoises

Government
  - Mayor (2020–2026): Christophe Piquemal
- Area^{1}: 10.62 km^{2} (4.10 sq mi)
- Elevation: 936 m (3,071 ft)
- Highest elevation: 1,200 m (3,900 ft)
- Lowest elevation: 593 m (1,946 ft)
- Population (2023): 61
  - Density: 5.7/km^{2} (15/sq mi)
- Time zone: UTC+01:00 (CET)
  - Summer (DST): UTC+02:00 (CEST)
- INSEE/Postal code: 11019 /11140
- ^{1} French Land Register data, which excludes lakes, ponds, glaciers > 1 km^{2} (0.386 sq mi or 247 acres) and river estuaries.

Aunat (French pronunciation: [onat]) is a commune in the Aude department in the Occitanie region of southern France.

== Geography ==
Aunat is located some 60 km west by north-west of Perpignan and 25 km east by north-east of Ax-les-Thermes. Access to the commune is by the D20 road from Rodome in the west which passes through the village and continues east to Bessède-de-Sault. The D29 road comes from Fontanès-de-Sault in the south and passes through the length of the commune and the village before continuing north-west to join the D107 north-east of Belfort-sur-Rebenty. The commune is mostly rugged and forested but with farmland in the valley around the village.

The Ruisseau du Mouillou rises in the north-east of the commune and flows west gathering several tributaries from the north including the Ruisseau du Bernet and the Ruisseau de Valmajou before joining the Ruisseau de Romanis on the western border of the commune.

=== Heraldry ===
Arms of Aunat	Blazon: Or, an alder tree eradicated of Gules.

== Administration ==
List of Successive Mayors

From	To	Name
2001	2008	Lucien Faure
2008	2014	Jean Séguéla
2014	2020	Henri Vaquer
2020	2026	Christophe Piquemal

== Demography ==
The inhabitants of the commune are known as Aunatois or Aunatoises in French.

Historical population

Year	Pop.	±% p.a.
1793	354	—
1821	481	+1.10%
1846	498	+0.14%
1872	469	−0.23%
1901	403	−0.52%
1926	253	−1.84%
1946	200	−1.17%
1962	150	−1.78%
1968	134	−1.86%

Year	Pop.	±% p.a.
1975	119	−1.68%
1982	82	−5.18%
1990	55	−4.87%
1999	52	−0.62%
2007	49	−0.74%
2012	40	−3.98%
2017	67	+10.87%
2023	61	−1.55%

Source: EHESS and INSEE

== Notable people linked to the commune ==
The paternal side of Edgar Faure originated from this commune for many generations before 1850.

== See also ==
- Communes of the Aude department
