= Alaigne =

Commune in Occitanie, France

- Commune
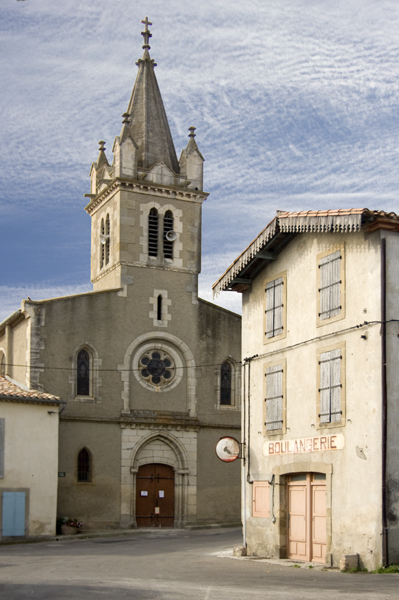
- The church in Alaigne

- Coat of arms
- Location of Alaigne
- Location within France Location within Occitanie
- Coordinates: 43°06′08″N 2°05′30″E
- Country: France
- Region: Occitania
- Department: Aude
- Arrondissement: Limoux
- Canton: La Piège au Razès
- Intercommunality: Limouxin

Government
  - Mayor (2020–2026): Jean Périllou
- Area^{1}: 13.86 km^{2} (5.35 sq mi)
- Elevation: 330 m (1,080 ft)
- Highest elevation: 444 m (1,457 ft)
- Lowest elevation: 244 m (801 ft)
- Population (2023): 327
  - Density: 23.6/km^{2} (61.1/sq mi)
- Time zone: UTC+01:00 (CET)
  - Summer (DST): UTC+02:00 (CEST)
- INSEE/Postal code: 11004 /11240
- ^{1} French Land Register data, which excludes lakes, ponds, glaciers > 1 km^{2} (0.386 sq mi or 247 acres) and river estuaries.

Alaigne (French pronunciation: [alɛɲ]; Occitan: Alanha) is a commune in the Aude department in the Occitanie region of southern France.

== Geography ==
The commune is located some 10 km north-west of Limoux and 20 km east of Mirepoix. A number of district roads all converge on the village of Alaigne: the D102 south from Belvèze-du-Razès, the D702 west from Routier, the D102 north-west from Limoux, and the D52 which comes east from Bellegarde-du-Razès then continues south to Villelongue-d'Aude.

The village itself is a traditional Circulade located in the historical region of Razès.

Located in the AOP Malepere wine growing area, the commune is mostly vineyards and farmland for wheat, rape and sunflowers with a few scattered forests. There are no villages or hamlets other than Alaigne.

=== Heraldry ===
Arms of Alaigne	This is the arms of the last Archbishop of Narbonne, Arthur Richard Dillon. The communes of Bize-Minervois, Gruissan, Pieusse, and Routier which were also strongholds of the Archbishop of Narbonne have the same arms. Blazon: Argent, a lion passant of gules between three crescents 2 and 1 the same.

== History ==
Before the Revolution, Alaigne was a part of Pieusse and Routier was a barony of the Archbishop of Narbonne.

== Administration ==
List of Successive Mayors of Alaigne

From	To	Name	Party	Position
1906	1912	Urbain Frontil		General Councillor
2001	2026	Jean Périllou		

== Population ==
The inhabitants of the commune are known as Alaignois or Alaignoises in French.

Historical population
Year	Pop.	±% p.a.
1968	385	—
1975	366	−0.72%
1982	330	−1.47%
1990	290	−1.60%
1999	300	+0.38%
2007	337	+1.46%
2012	343	+0.35%
2017	326	−1.01%
2023	327	+0.05%
Source: INSEE

== Culture and heritage ==
=== Civil heritage ===
- The Porte de Papi Fortified door (15th century) is registered as an historical monument.

=== Religious heritage ===
- The Cemetery contains a number of items that are registered as historical objects:
  - A Funeral Stèle (1668)
  - A Funeral Stèle (16th century)
  - A Funeral Stèle (17th century)
  - 2 Funeral Stèles (16th century)
- The Parish Church of Saint-Pierre es Liens contains a number of items that are registered as historical objects:
  - A Chalice with Paten (18th century)
  - A Chalice with Paten (1798 & 1809)
  - 2 Stoups (18th century)
  - The facing of the Altar and the communion table (18th century)
  - A Reliquary Cross of Saint Julie (17th century)

== See also ==
- Communes of the Aude department
