= Razès =

Historical area in southwestern France

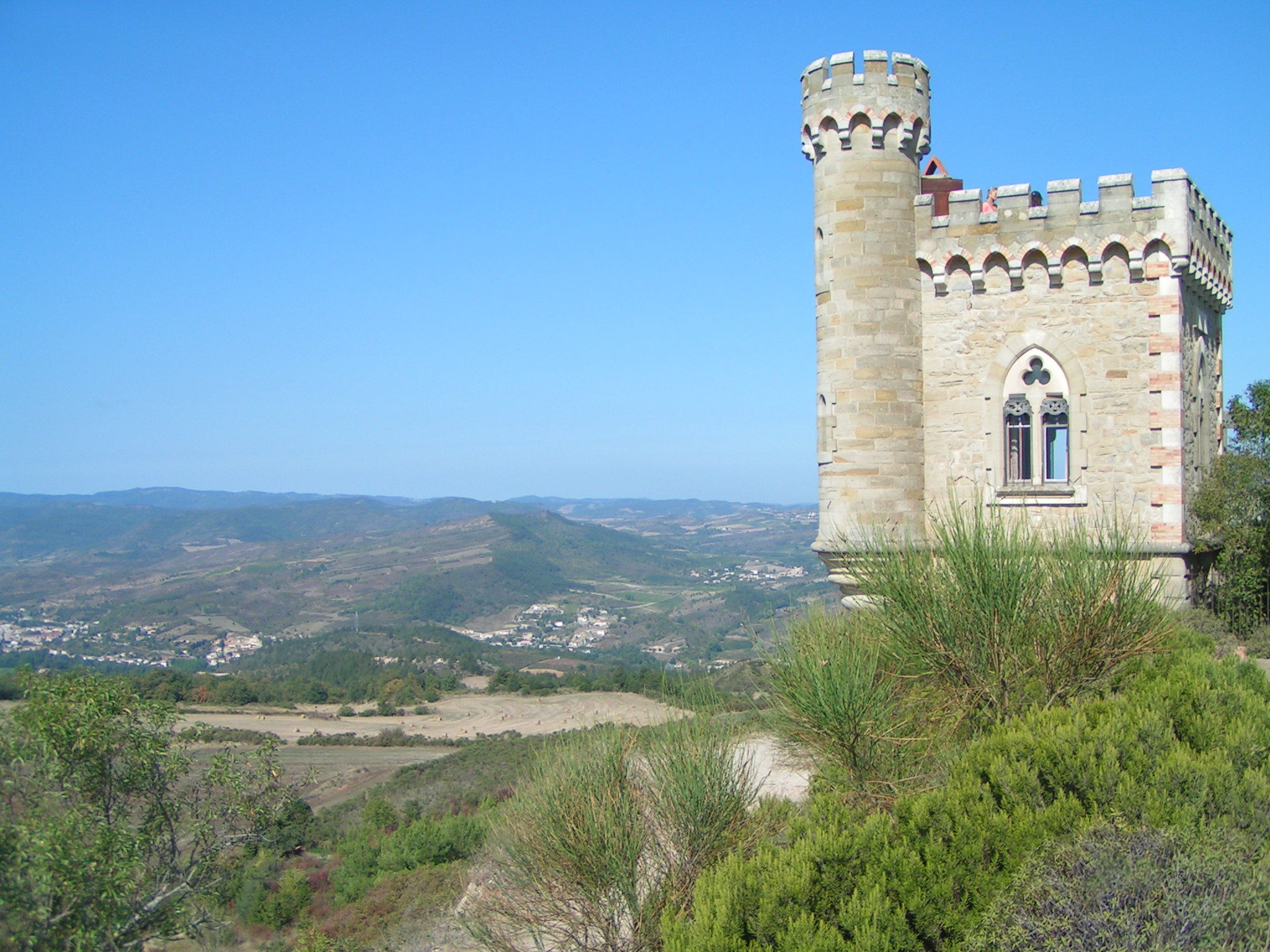
Razès, viewed from Rennes-le-Château

Razès (French pronunciation: [ʁazɛs]; Occitan: Rasés; Catalan: Rasès) is a historical area in southwestern France, in today's Aude département.

Several communes of the département include Razès in their name:

- Bellegarde-du-Razès
- Belvèze-du-Razès
- Fenouillet-du-Razès
- Fonters-du-Razès
- Mazerolles-du-Razès
- Peyrefitte-du-Razès
- Saint-Couat-du-Razès
- Villarzel-du-Razès

== See also ==
- County of Razès
