= Artigues =

Artigues is the name or part of the name of several communes in France:

- Artigues, Ariège, in the Ariège department
- Artigues, Aude, in the Aude department
- Artigues, Hautes-Pyrénées, in the Hautes-Pyrénées department
- Artigues, Var, in the Var department
- Artigues-près-Bordeaux, in the Gironde department
- Les Artigues-de-Lussac, in the Gironde department

It may also refer to a locality in the metropolitan area of Barcelona:

- Artigues, Badalona
- The Barcelona Metro station Artigues-Sant Adrià

== See also ==
- Artigue, in the Haute-Garonne department
