= Nébias =

Commune in Occitanie, France

- Commune
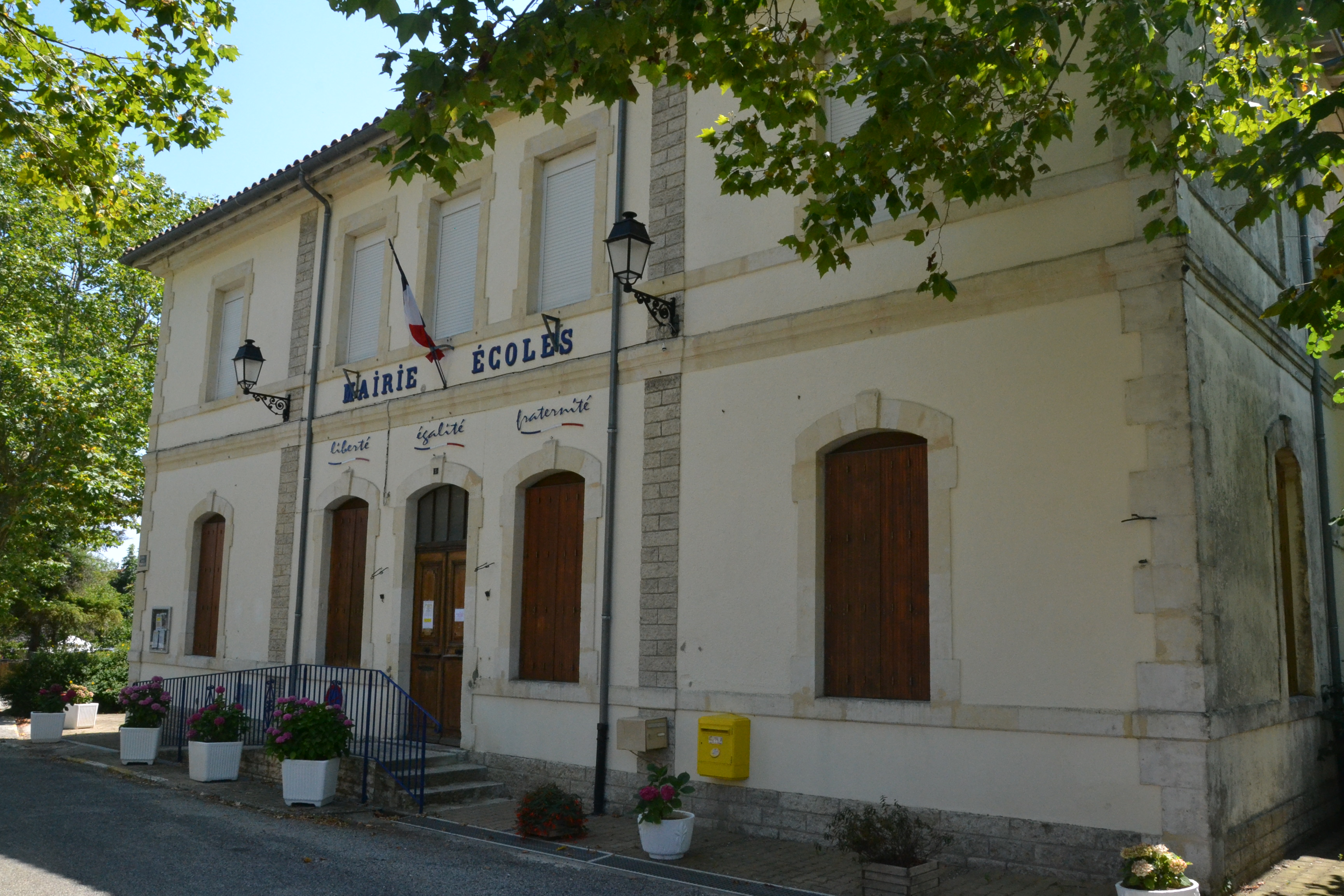
- The town hall and school in Nébias

- Coat of arms
- Location of Nébias
- Location within France Location within Occitanie
- Coordinates: 42°53′51″N 2°06′59″E
- Country: France
- Region: Occitania
- Department: Aude
- Arrondissement: Limoux
- Canton: La Haute-Vallée de l'Aude
- Intercommunality: Pyrénées audoises

Government
  - Mayor (2020–2026): Alain Bonnéry (PCF)
- Area^{1}: 12.69 km^{2} (4.90 sq mi)
- Elevation: 581 m (1,906 ft)
- Highest elevation: 1,121 m (3,678 ft)
- Lowest elevation: 509 m (1,670 ft)
- Population (2023): 262
  - Density: 20.6/km^{2} (53.5/sq mi)
- Time zone: UTC+01:00 (CET)
  - Summer (DST): UTC+02:00 (CEST)
- INSEE/Postal code: 11263 /11500
- ^{1} French Land Register data, which excludes lakes, ponds, glaciers > 1 km^{2} (0.386 sq mi or 247 acres) and river estuaries.

Nébias (French pronunciation: [nebjas]; Occitan: Nebiàs) is a commune in the Aude department in southern France. Its inhabitants are called Nébiassais.

== Geography ==
The commune of Nébias is crossed by the Atlantic-Mediterranean Drainage divide that separates the village in two halves. It is symbolized by a particular fountain. The area is under three different climatic influences : mediterranean, oceanic and alpine. The south of the commune (common beech-fir tree forest) is part of the forest of the fr:pays de Sault. There is no river present in the area other than seasonal streams.

== Coat of arms ==

Heraldry of the commune : Sinople, a pale bretessé silver.

== Population ==
Historical population
Year	Pop.	±% p.a.
1968	237	—
1975	285	+2.67%
1982	284	−0.05%
1990	247	−1.73%
1999	244	−0.14%
2007	260	+0.80%
2012	261	+0.08%
2017	246	−1.18%
2023	262	+1.06%
Source: INSEE

== Sites and monuments ==
- Castle from the 13th century, modified until the 19th century, belonging to the de Mauléon family.
- Church very ancient, rebuilt in the late 19th century, one bell and two chandeliers as well as the altar table listed in the historical furniture register.
- Chapel Sainte-Claire from the 16th century with older non-dated foundations.
- Many fountains and a communal lavoir within the village and the hamlet of Lafage (Round fountain-abreuvoir said to be "of the church", a fountain-abreuvoir with 3 rectangular basins "of the Griffoul" below the village (to the south), very old twin basin lavoir at the Lafage hamlet).
- The site of the windmill overlooking the village, starting point of the "Sentier Nature" contains very old remains. The ruins of two windmills restored in 1997 and 2003 as well as the fort built by the Wehrmacht for Anti-aircraft warfare in 1942.
- From here a trek, the Sentier Nature, forms a loop leading to the natural site of the Labyrinthe Vert. It consists of a meandering path across a very characteristic karstic maze, lost in a forest of oak and boxwood, among other mediterranean plants. Along the path, you will discover beautiful clearings. Human presence in this landscape is so ancient that the modern walker is following the footsteps of medieval shepherds and even beyond. Within le Labyrinthe Vert are the "Cami Salvatge" with its "named boulders", "le Grand Lapiaz" (the Great rock field) and the "Clot des Encantados" (the Fairies den), not far from the "Sapin Harpe" (harp fir tree).

The trek opened in 1987, and continues to the château de Puivert, either by a forest track bordering the Sentier Nature next to the Borde d'en Dominique, or by the sentier Cathare at the south coming from the chapelle Sainte-Claire.

- Scenic forest path of the lac du Tury leading to the Montmija observation platform (1000m) then further to the "Sapin Géant" (giant fir tree), in the forest domainiale of Callong.

== See also ==
- Communes of the Aude department
