= Artigues, Aude =

Commune in Occitanie, France

Artigues
- Commune
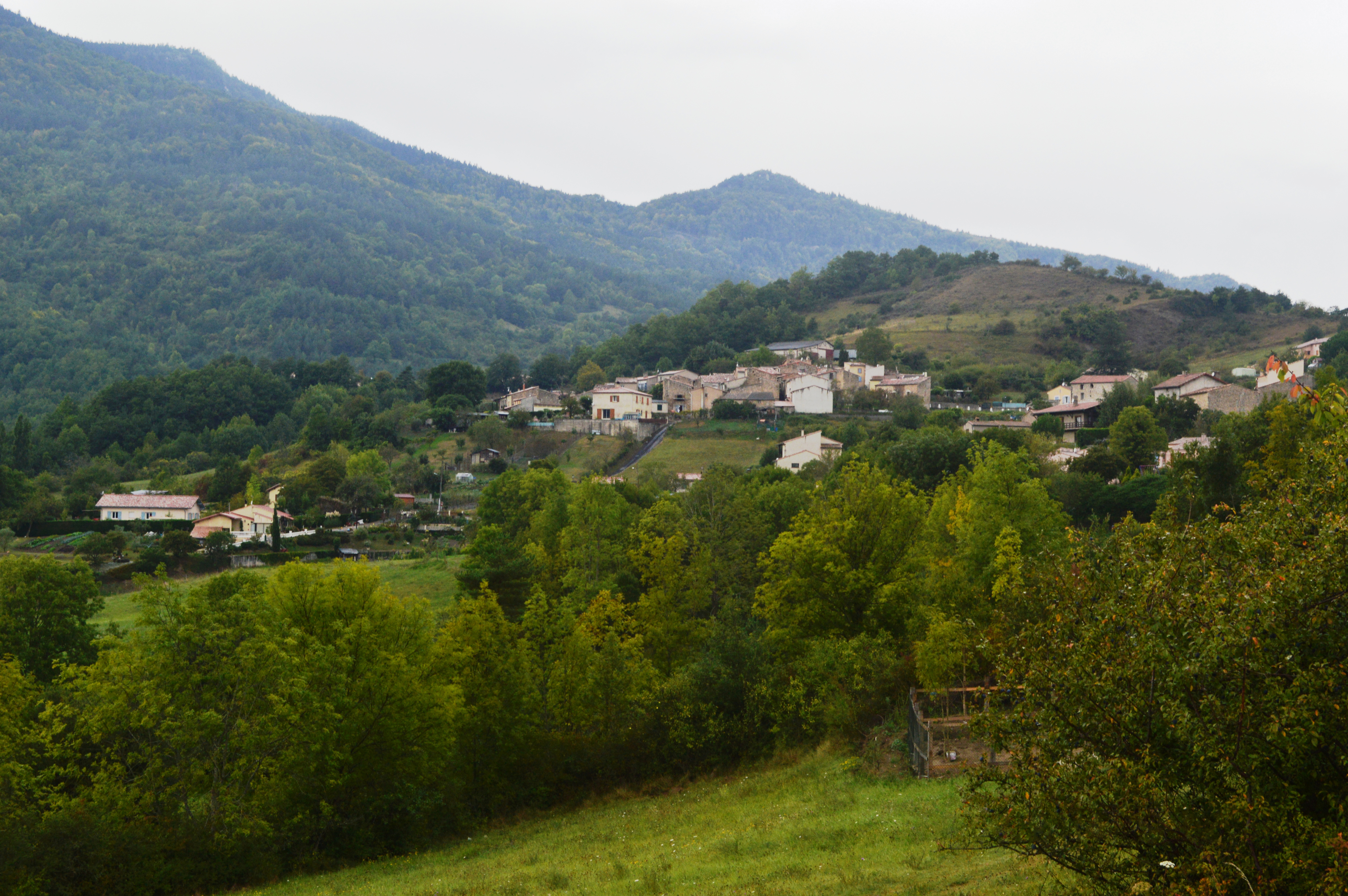
- A general view of Artigues

- Coat of arms
- Location of Artigues
- Location within France Location within Occitanie
- Coordinates: 42°48′00″N 2°13′00″E
- Country: France
- Region: Occitania
- Department: Aude
- Arrondissement: Limoux
- Canton: La Haute-Vallée de l'Aude
- Intercommunality: CC Pyrénées Audoises

Government
  - Mayor (2020–2026): Serge Mounié
- Area^{1}: 6.38 km^{2} (2.46 sq mi)
- Elevation: 450 m (1,480 ft)
- Population (2023): 72
  - Density: 11/km^{2} (29/sq mi)
- Time zone: UTC+01:00 (CET)
  - Summer (DST): UTC+02:00 (CEST)
- INSEE/Postal code: 11017 /11140
- ^{1} French Land Register data, which excludes lakes, ponds, glaciers > 1 km^{2} (0.386 sq mi or 247 acres) and river estuaries.

Artigues (French pronunciation: [aʁtiɡ]; Occitan: Artigas) is a commune in the Aude department in the Occitanie region of southern France.

== Geography ==
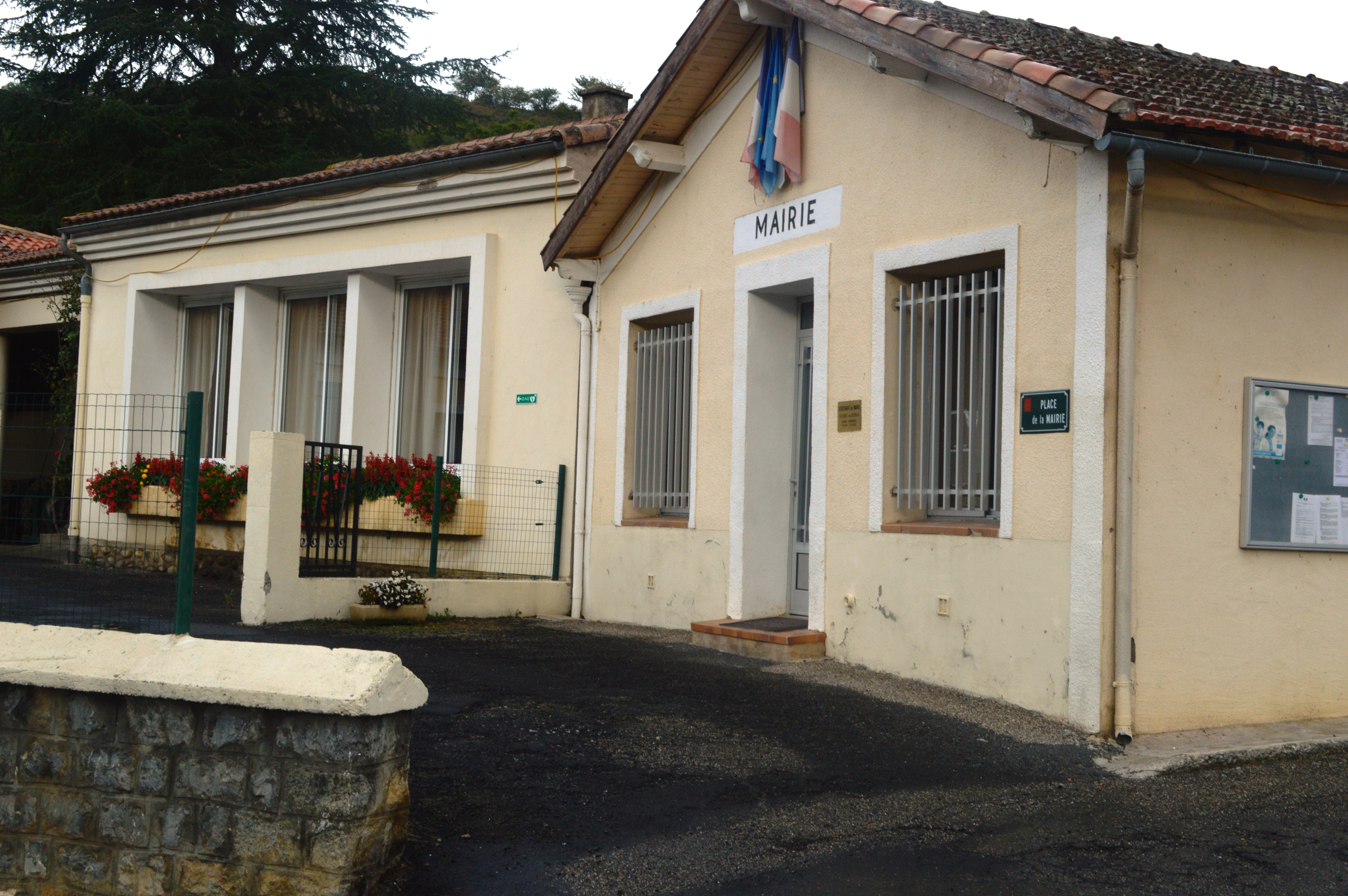
Artigues Mairie

Artigues is located some 10 km south by south-east of Quillan and 2 km west of Axat. Access to the commune is by the D83 road from Axat in the east passing through the village and continuing west then south by a tortuous route to Le Clat. The commune is rugged and heavily forested but with a little farming activity near the village.

The river Aude forms the south-eastern border of the commune as it flows north. The Ruisseau de l'Esteille rises in the south of the commune and flows east to join the Aude east of the commune. The Ruisseau de la Fage rises in the south of the commune and flows north to join the Ruisseau d'Artigues just south of the village which flows east to join the Aude.

=== Heraldry ===
Arms of Artigues	The official status of the blazon remains to be determined Blazon: Party per fesse, Or and Azure.

== Administration ==
List of Successive Mayors

From	To	Name	Party
2001	2008	Christian Domingo	
2001	2026	Serge Mounié	PS

== Demography ==
The inhabitants of the commune are known as Artiguais or Artiguaises in French.

Historical population

Year	Pop.	±% p.a.
1793	134	—
1821	204	+1.51%
1846	206	+0.04%
1872	184	−0.43%
1901	164	−0.40%
1926	125	−1.08%
1946	125	+0.00%
1962	92	−1.90%
1968	102	+1.73%

Year	Pop.	±% p.a.
1975	95	−1.01%
1982	94	−0.15%
1990	83	−1.54%
1999	82	−0.13%
2007	88	+0.89%
2012	82	−1.40%
2017	73	−2.30%
2023	72	−0.23%

Source: EHESS and INSEE

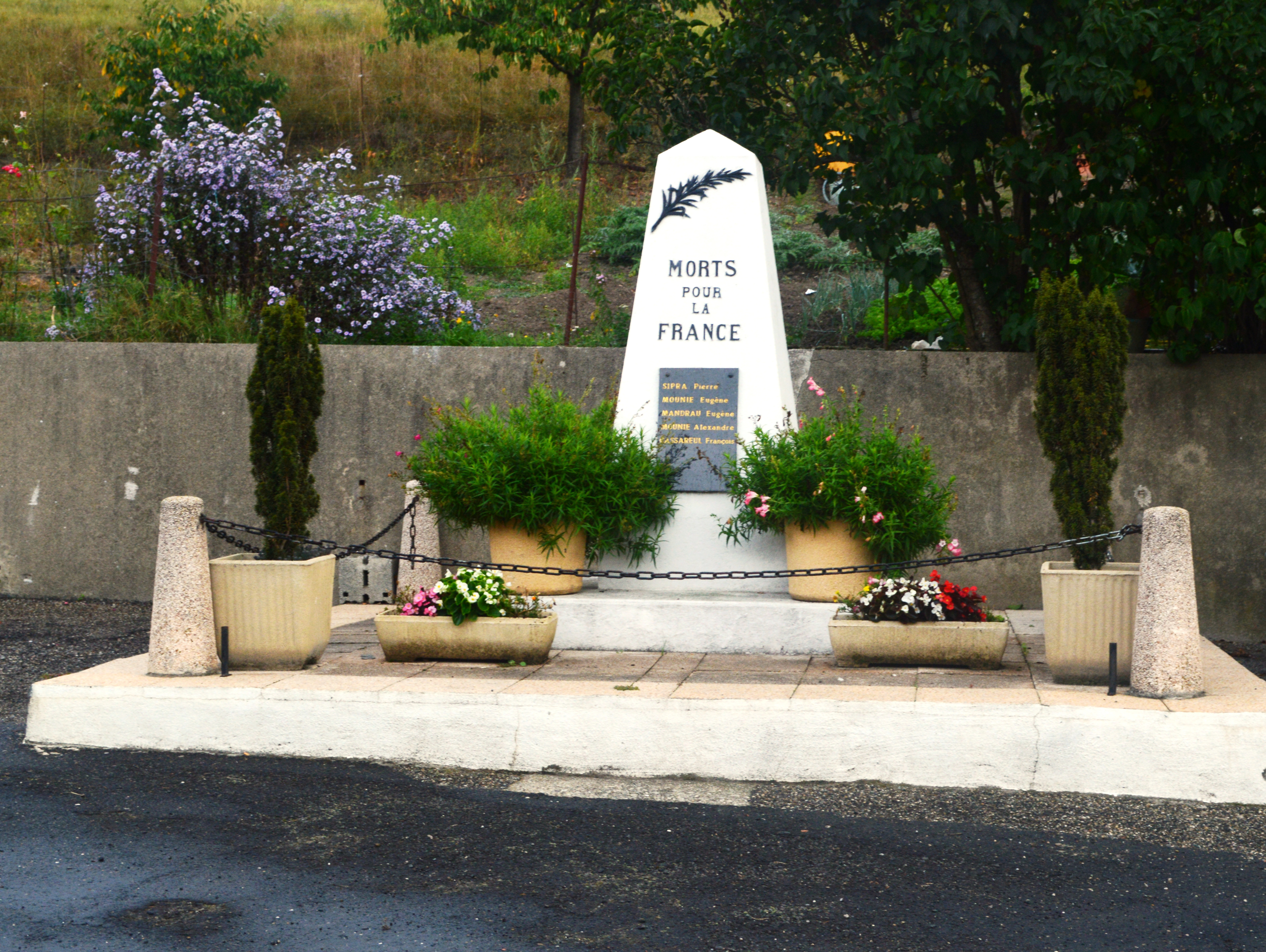
Artigues War Memorial

== Sites and monuments ==
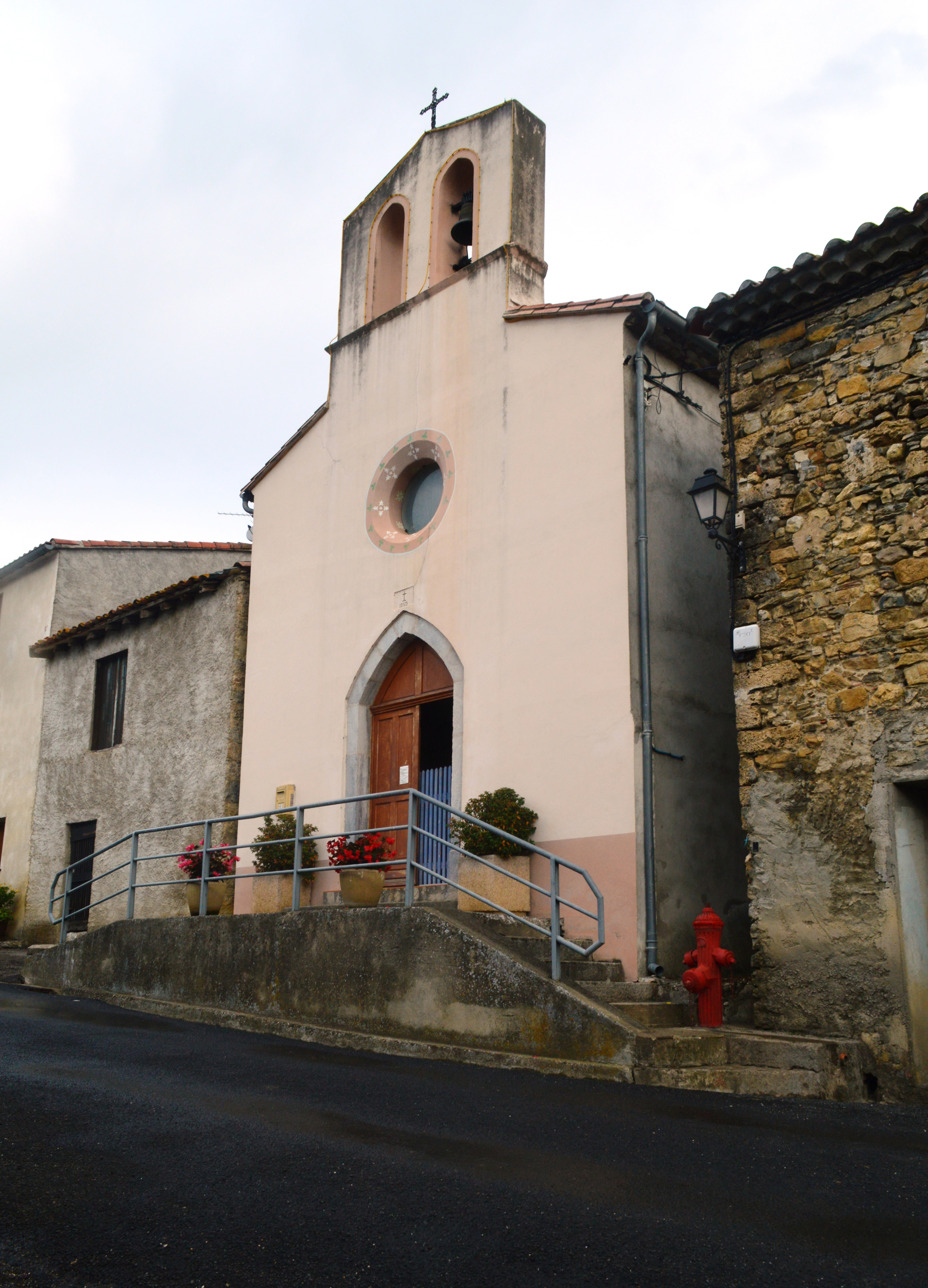
The Church of Saint Nicolas

- The Church of Saint-Nicolas (1830);
- The Gorge of Saint-Georges, with cliffs 300m high;
- The Col du Garabeil.

=== Church Picture Gallery ===
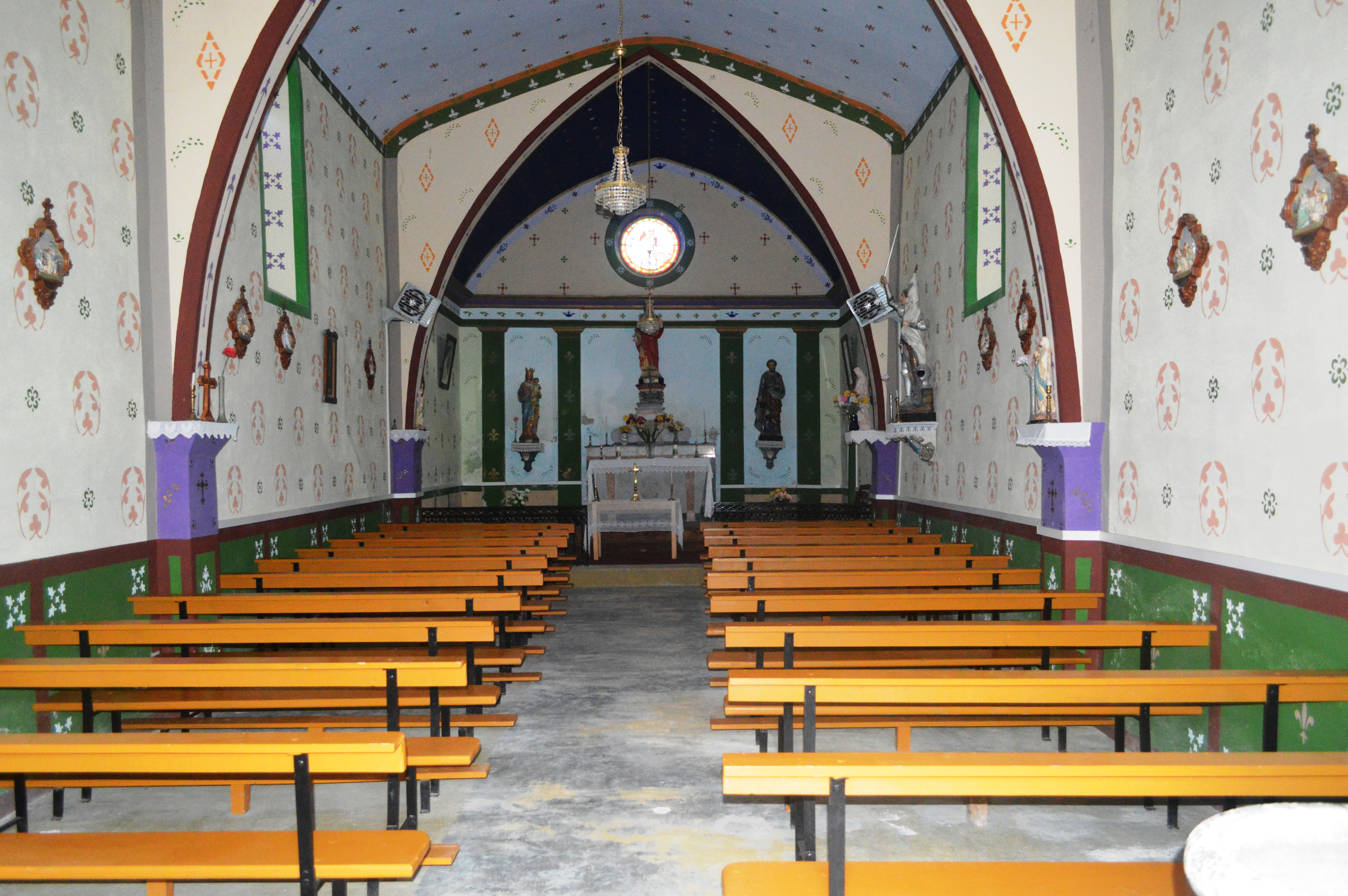
Artigues Church Interior

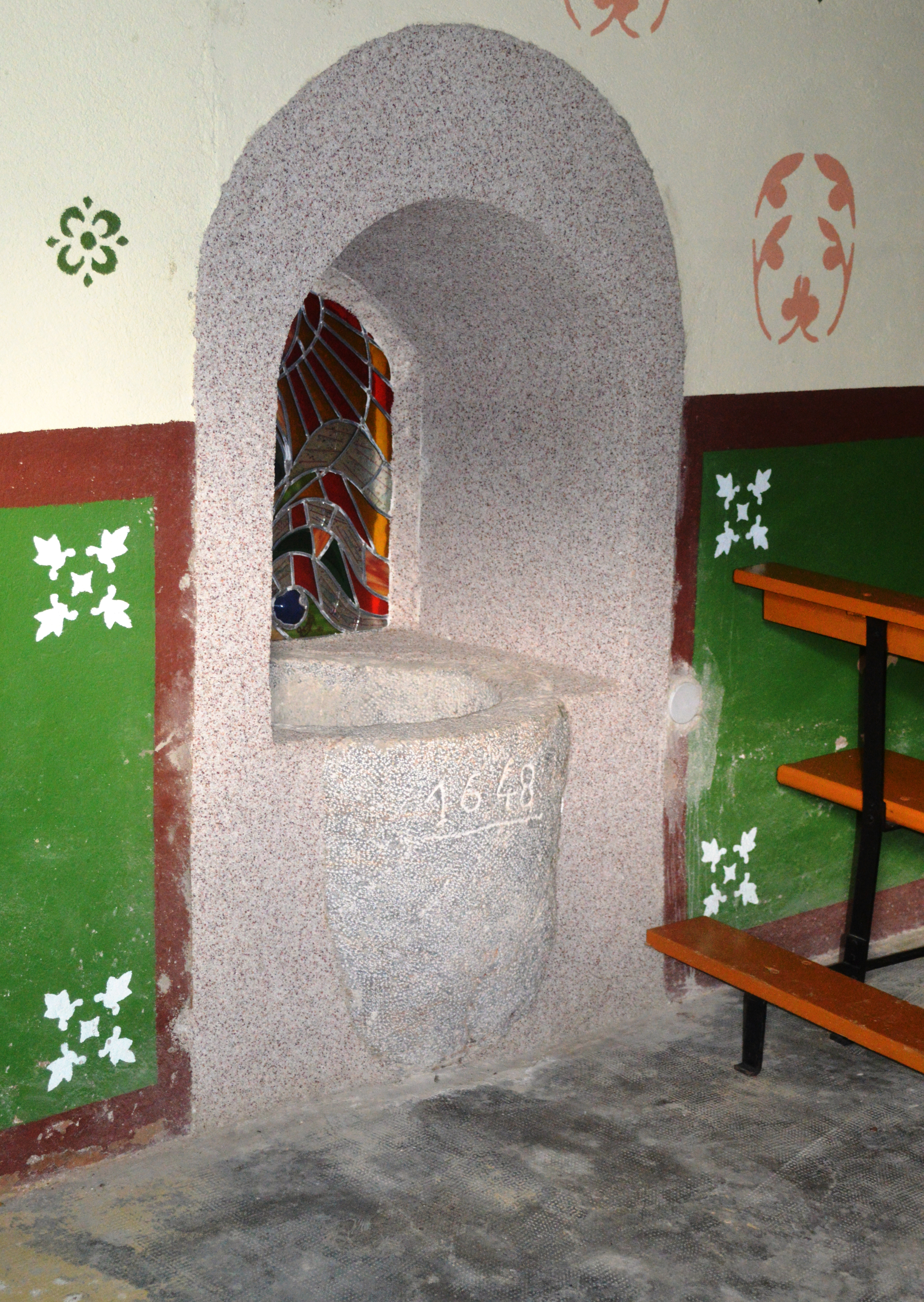
Baptismal Font from 1648

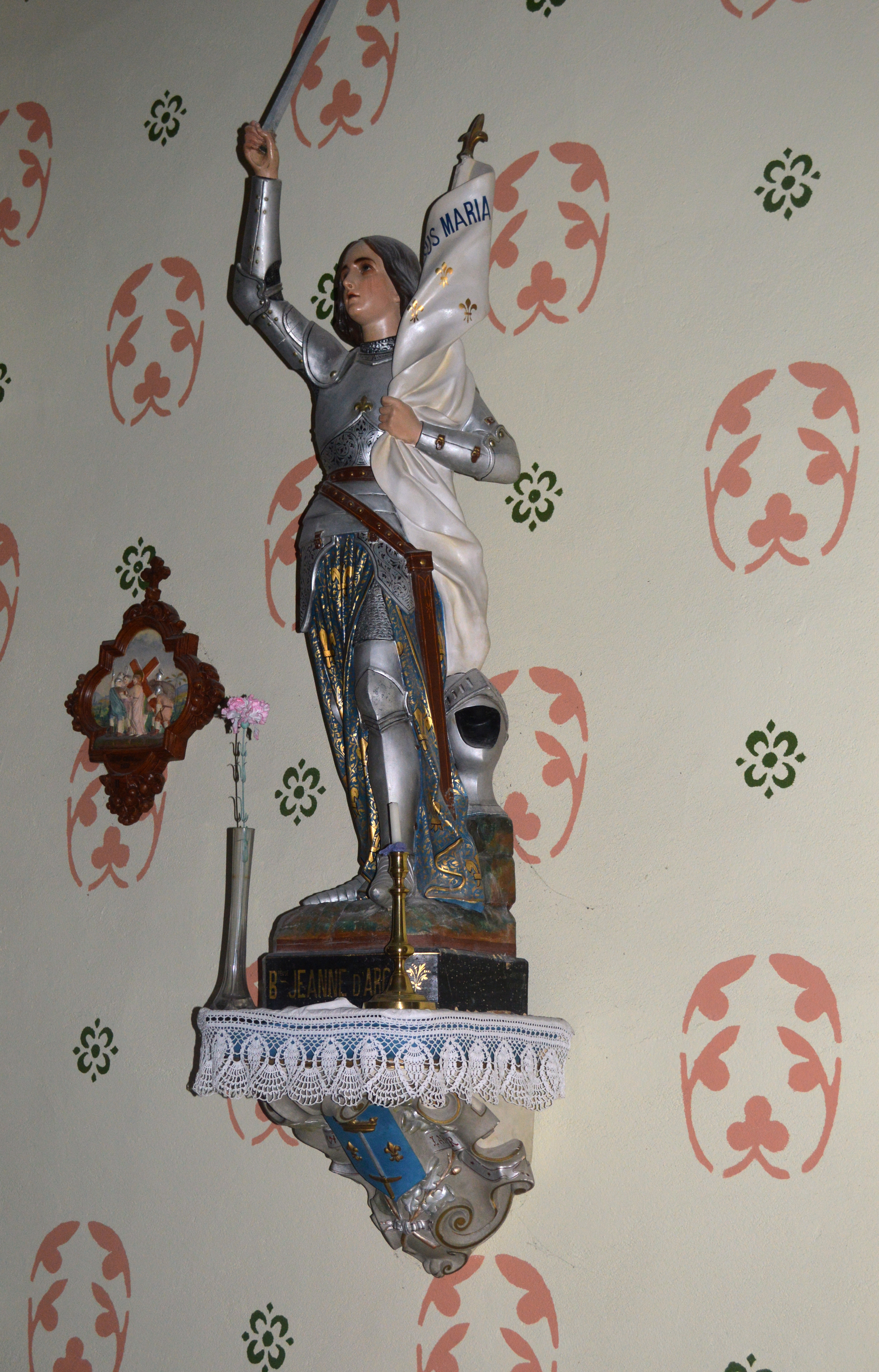
A statue of Joan of Arc in the Church

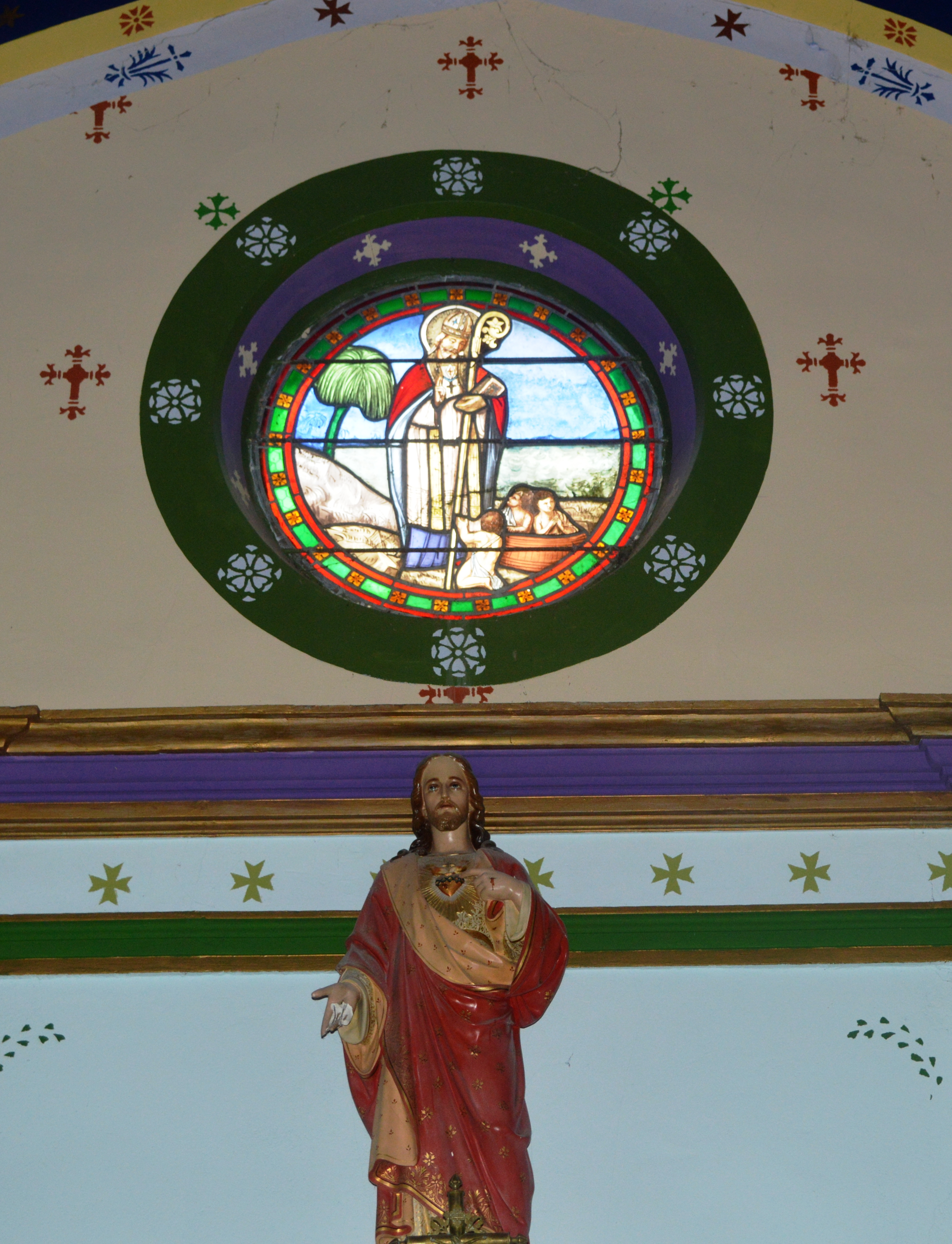
Stained Glass in the Church

== See also ==
- Communes of the Aude department
