= Saint-Martin-Lys =

Commune in Occitanie, France

- Commune
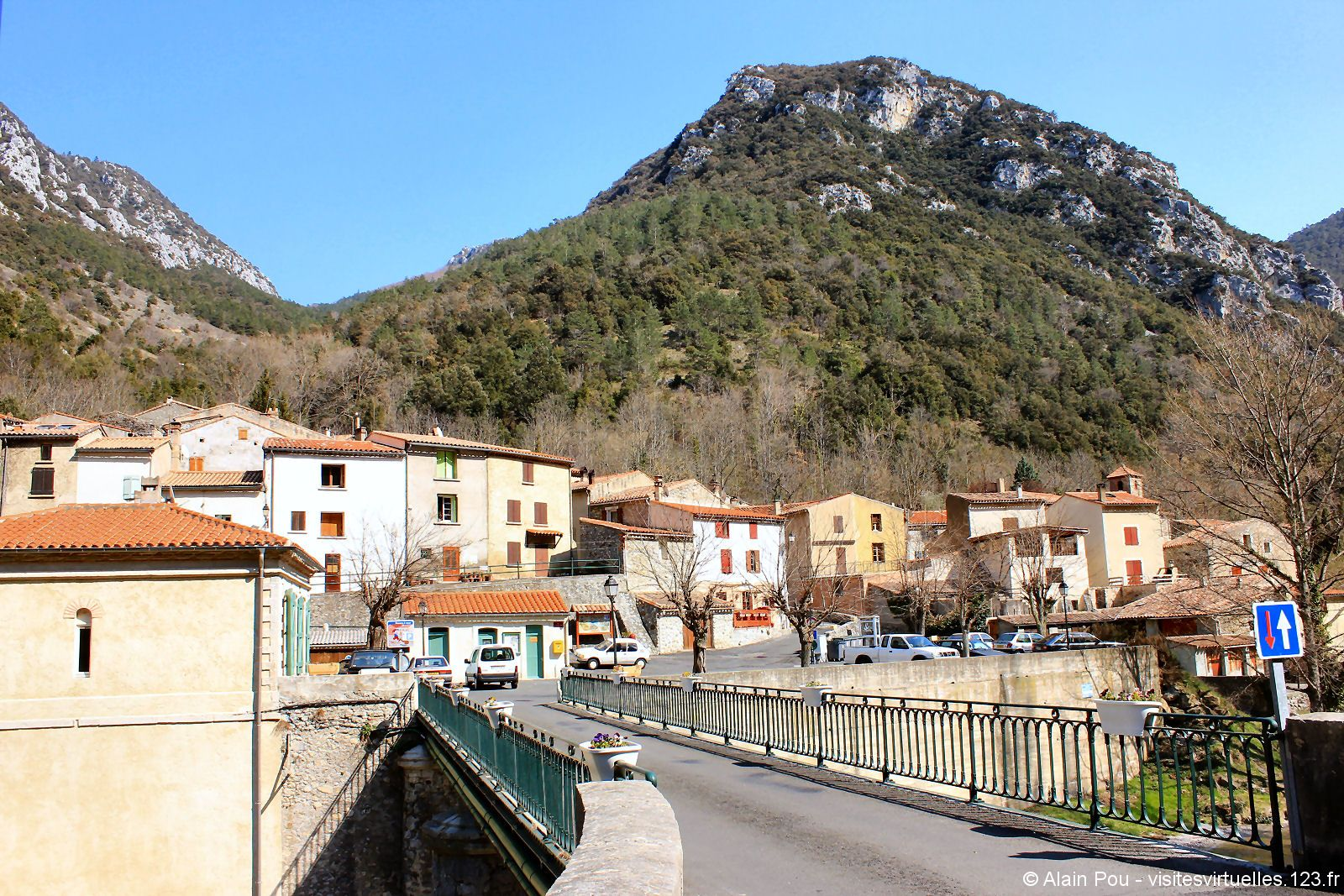
- A general view of Saint-Martin-Lys
- Location of Saint-Martin-Lys
- Location within France Location within Occitanie
- Coordinates: 42°49′42″N 2°13′36″E
- Country: France
- Region: Occitania
- Department: Aude
- Arrondissement: Limoux
- Canton: La Haute-Vallée de l'Aude
- Intercommunality: Pyrénées Audoises

Government
  - Mayor (2020–2026): Rose-Marie Manaud
- Area^{1}: 9.99 km^{2} (3.86 sq mi)
- Elevation: 362 m (1,188 ft)
- Highest elevation: 1,041 m (3,415 ft)
- Lowest elevation: 340 m (1,120 ft)
- Population (2023): 23
  - Density: 2.3/km^{2} (6.0/sq mi)
- Time zone: UTC+01:00 (CET)
  - Summer (DST): UTC+02:00 (CEST)
- INSEE/Postal code: 11358 /11500
- ^{1} French Land Register data, which excludes lakes, ponds, glaciers > 1 km^{2} (0.386 sq mi or 247 acres) and river estuaries.

Saint-Martin-Lys (French pronunciation: [sɛ̃ maʁtɛ̃ lis]; Languedocien: Sant Martin de Les) is a commune in the Aude department in southern France.

== Population ==
Historical population
Year	Pop.	±% p.a.
1968	67	—
1975	44	−5.83%
1982	40	−1.35%
1990	31	−3.14%
1999	46	+4.48%
2007	49	+0.79%
2012	34	−7.05%
2017	25	−5.96%
2023	23	−1.38%
Source: INSEE

== History ==
The abbey of Saint-Martin-Lys appears in the texts in 898 when the monk Leuva gave the monastery a vineyard located in Cailla. She then receives many donations throughout the Viscount Fenouillèdes. Pope Agapet II confirmed his possessions in 954. The monks then cultivate vineyards, olive trees and cereals. The monastery has a tine or cellars where are brought to Brugens crops in the region, today in the municipality of Caudies Fenouilledes.

== Geography ==
Municipality located in the upper valley of the Aude, legally part of the Fenouillèdes, the small village of Saint-Martin-Lys is between two gorges (near the parade of Pierre-Lys ). Overlooked by two mountains, the village borders the Aude.

== See also ==
- Communes of the Aude department
