= Marsa, Aude =

Commune in Occitanie, France

Marsa
- Commune
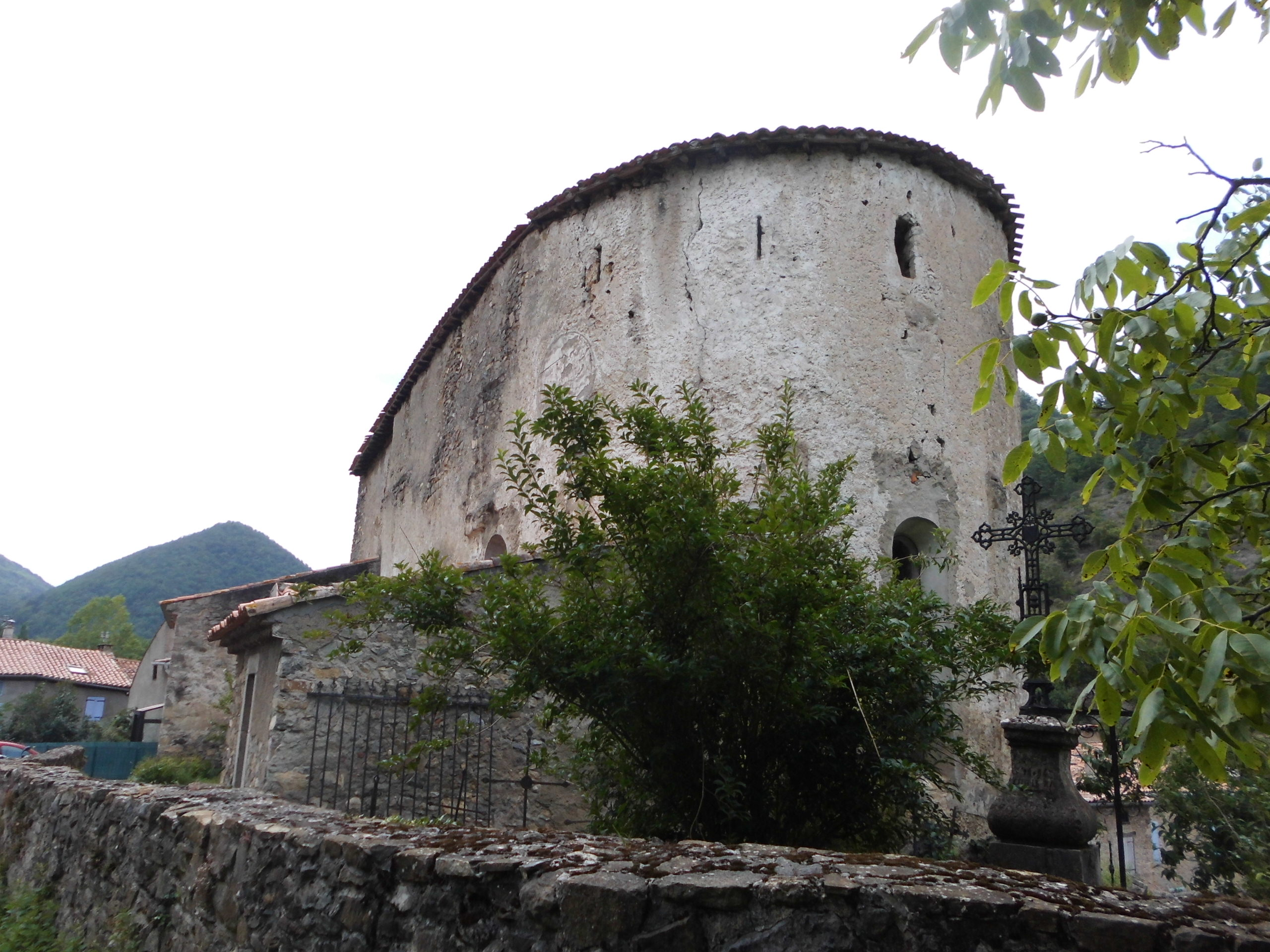
- The church in Marsa

- Coat of arms
- Location of Marsa
- Location within France Location within Occitanie
- Coordinates: 42°49′24″N 2°09′23″E
- Country: France
- Region: Occitania
- Department: Aude
- Arrondissement: Limoux
- Canton: La Haute-Vallée de l'Aude
- Intercommunality: Pyrénées Audoises

Government
  - Mayor (2023–2026): Sauveur Traniello
- Area^{1}: 19.17 km^{2} (7.40 sq mi)
- Elevation: 492 m (1,614 ft)
- Highest elevation: 1,241 m (4,072 ft)
- Lowest elevation: 461 m (1,512 ft)
- Population (2023): 24
  - Density: 1.3/km^{2} (3.2/sq mi)
- Time zone: UTC+01:00 (CET)
  - Summer (DST): UTC+02:00 (CEST)
- INSEE/Postal code: 11219 /11140
- ^{1} French Land Register data, which excludes lakes, ponds, glaciers > 1 km^{2} (0.386 sq mi or 247 acres) and river estuaries.

Marsa (French pronunciation: [maʁsa]; Occitan: Marçan) is a commune in the Aude department in southern France.

== Population ==
Historical population
Year	Pop.	±% p.a.
1968	55	—
1975	61	+1.49%
1982	50	−2.80%
1990	45	−1.31%
1999	26	−5.91%
2007	28	+0.93%
2012	23	−3.86%
2017	18	−4.78%
2023	24	+4.91%
Source: INSEE

== See also ==
- Communes of the Aude department
