= Communes of the Aude department =

The following is a list of the 433 communes of the Aude department of France.

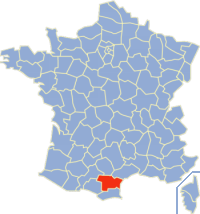
Location of the Aude département within France

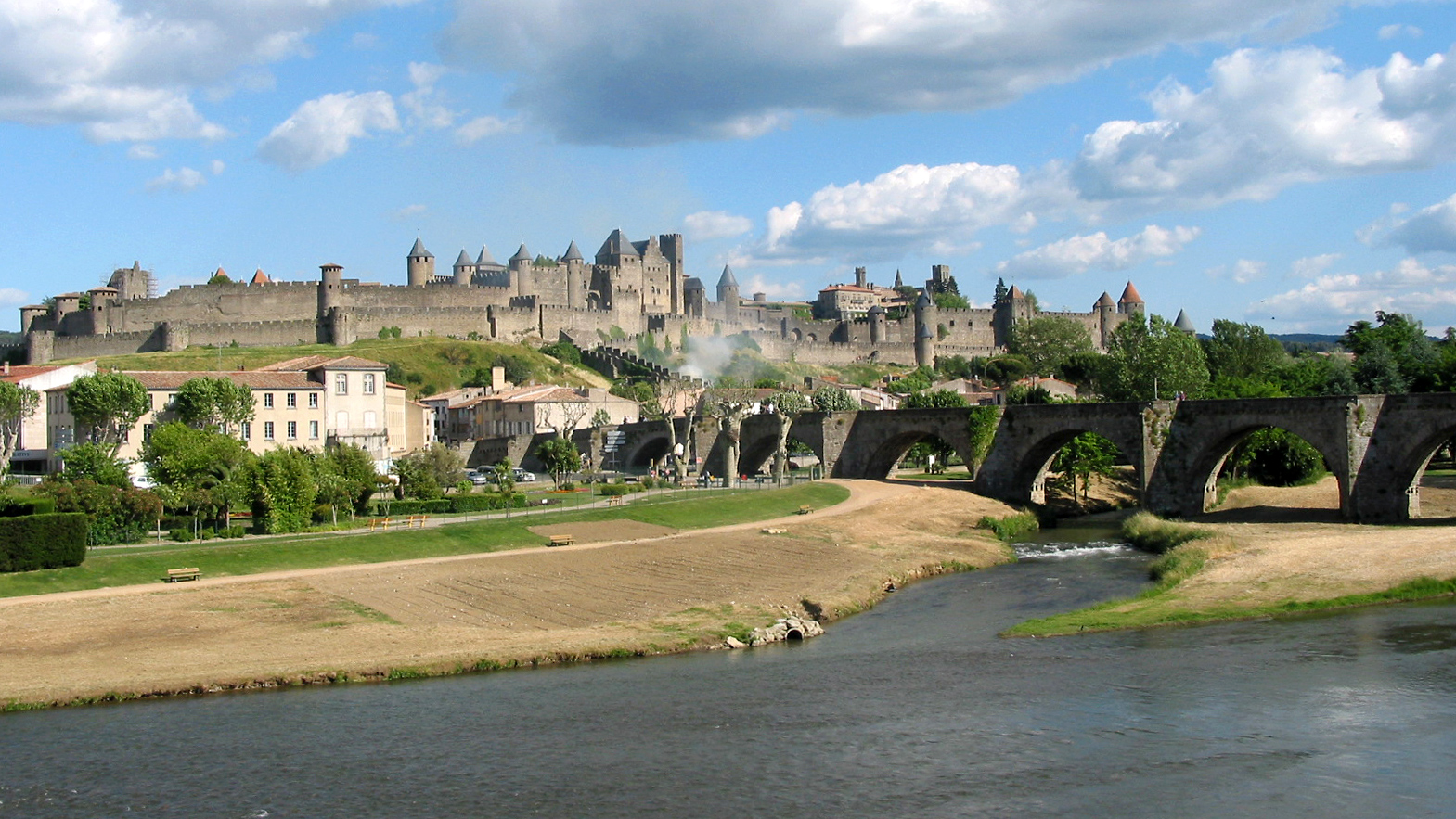

The communes cooperate in the following intercommunalities (as of 2025):

- Communauté d'agglomération Carcassonne Agglo
- Communauté d'agglomération Le Grand Narbonne
- Communauté de communes Castelnaudary Lauragais Audois
- Communauté de communes Corbières Salanque Méditerranée (partly)
- Communauté de communes du Limouxin
- Communauté de communes de la Montagne Noire
- Communauté de communes Piège-Lauragais-Malepère
- Communauté de communes des Pyrénées Audoises
- Communauté de communes Région Lézignanaise, Corbières et Minervois
- Communauté de communes aux sources du Canal du Midi (partly)

INSEE	Postal	Commune
11001	11800	Aigues-Vives
11002	11320	Airoux
11003	11300	Ajac
11004	11240	Alaigne
11005	11290	Alairac
11006	11360	Albas
11007	11330	Albières
11008	11580	Alet-les-Bains
11009	11170	Alzonne
11010	11190	Antugnac
11011	11600	Aragon
11012	11120	Argeliers
11013	11200	Argens-Minervois
11014	11110	Armissan
11015	11190	Arques
11016	11220	Arquettes-en-Val
11017	11140	Artigues
11018	11290	Arzens
11019	11140	Aunat
11020	11330	Auriac
11021	11140	Axat
11022	11700	Azille
11023	11800	Badens
11024	11100	Bages
11025	11600	Bagnoles
11026	11410	Baraigne
11027	11800	Barbaira
11028	11340	Belcaire
11029	11580	Belcastel-et-Buc
11030	11410	Belflou
11031	11140	Belfort-sur-Rebenty
11032	11240	Bellegarde-du-Razès
11033	11420	Belpech
11034	11240	Belvèze-du-Razès
11035	11500	Belvianes-et-Cavirac
11036	11340	Belvis
11037	11090	Berriac
11038	11140	Bessède-de-Sault
11039	11300	La Bezole
11040	11200	Bizanet
11041	11120	Bize-Minervois
11042	11700	Blomac
11043	11800	Bouilhonnac
11044	11190	Bouisse
11045	11300	Bouriège
11046	11300	Bourigeole
11047	11140	Le Bousquet
11048	11200	Boutenac
11049	11150	Bram
11051	11270	Brézilhac
11052	11390	Brousses-et-Villaret
11053	11300	Brugairolles
11054	11400	Les Brunels
11055	11190	Bugarach
11056	11160	Cabrespine
11057	11420	Cahuzac
11058	11240	Cailhau
11059	11240	Cailhavel
11060	11140	Cailla
11061	11240	Cambieure
11062	11140	Campagna-de-Sault
11063	11260	Campagne-sur-Aude
11064	11200	Camplong-d'Aude
11065	11190	Camps-sur-l'Agly
11066	11340	Camurac
11067	11200	Canet
11068	11700	Capendu
11069	11000	Carcassonne
11070	11170	Carlipa
11071	11360	Cascastel-des-Corbières
11072	11270	La Cassaigne
11073	11190	Cassaignes
11074	11320	Les Cassés
11075	11160	Castans
11076	11400	Castelnaudary
11077	11700	Castelnau-d'Aude
11078	11300	Castelreng
11079	11390	Caudebronde
11081	11160	Caunes-Minervois
11083	11220	Caunettes-en-Val
11082	11250	Caunette-sur-Lauquet
11084	11170	Caux-et-Sauzens
11085	11570	Cavanac
11086	11510	Caves
11087	11270	Cazalrenoux
11088	11570	Cazilhac
11089	11170	Cenne-Monestiés
11090	11300	Cépie
11091	11230	Chalabre
11092	11160	Citou
11093	11140	Le Clat
11094	11250	Clermont-sur-Lauquet
11095	11700	Comigne
11096	11340	Comus
11098	11200	Conilhac-Corbières
11099	11600	Conques-sur-Orbiel
11100	11230	Corbières
11101	11500	Coudons
11102	11250	Couffoulens
11103	11190	Couiza
11104	11140	Counozouls
11105	11300	Cournanel
11106	11110	Coursan
11107	11230	Courtauly
11108	11240	La Courtète
11109	11190	Coustaussa
11110	11220	Coustouge
11111	11200	Cruscades
11112	11190	Cubières-sur-Cinoble
11113	11350	Cucugnan
11114	11410	Cumiès
11115	11390	Cuxac-Cabardès
11116	11590	Cuxac-d'Aude
11117	11330	Davejean
11118	11330	Dernacueillette
11119	11300	La Digne-d'Amont
11120	11300	La Digne-d'Aval
11121	11240	Donazac
11122	11700	Douzens
11123	11350	Duilhac-sous-Peyrepertuse
11124	11360	Durban-Corbières
11125	11360	Embres-et-Castelmaure
11126	11200	Escales
11127	11140	Escouloubre
11128	11240	Escueillens-et-Saint-Just-de-Bélengard
11129	11260	Espéraza
11130	11340	Espezel
11132	11200	Fabrezan
11133	11220	Fajac-en-Val
11134	11410	Fajac-la-Relenque
11135	11140	La Fajolle
11136	11270	Fanjeaux
11137	11330	Félines-Termenès
11138	11400	Fendeille
11139	11240	Fenouillet-du-Razès
11140	11200	Ferrals-les-Corbières
11141	11240	Ferran
11142	11300	Festes-et-Saint-André
11143	11510	Feuilla
11144	11510	Fitou
11145	11560	Fleury
11146	11800	Floure
11147	11140	Fontanès-de-Sault
11148	11700	Fontcouverte
11149	11400	Fonters-du-Razès
11150	11310	Fontiers-Cabardès
11151	11800	Fontiès-d'Aude
11152	11360	Fontjoncouse
11153	11270	La Force
11154	11600	Fournes-Cabardès
11155	11190	Fourtou
11156	11600	Fraisse-Cabardès
11157	11360	Fraissé-des-Corbières
11158	11300	Gaja-et-Villedieu
11159	11270	Gaja-la-Selve
11160	11140	Galinagues
11161	11250	Gardie
11162	11270	Generville
11163	11140	Gincla
11164	11120	Ginestas
11165	11500	Ginoles
11166	11410	Gourvieille
11167	11240	Gramazie
11168	11500	Granès
11169	11250	Greffeil
11170	11430	Gruissan
11172	11200	Homps
11173	11240	Hounoux
11174	11380	Les Ilhes
11175	11400	Issel
11176	11220	Jonquières
11177	11140	Joucou
11178	11320	Labastide-d'Anjou
11179	11220	Labastide-en-Val
11180	11380	Labastide-Esparbairenque
11181	11400	Labécède-Lauragais
11182	11310	Lacombe
11183	11250	Ladern-sur-Lauquet
11184	11420	Lafage
11185	11220	Lagrasse
11186	11330	Lairière
11187	11330	Lanet
11189	11390	Laprade
11191	11330	Laroque-de-Fa
11192	11400	Lasbordes
11193	11270	Lasserre-de-Prouille
11194	11600	Lastours
11195	11400	Laurabuc
11196	11270	Laurac
11197	11300	Lauraguel
11198	11800	Laure-Minervois
11199	11290	Lavalette
11200	11160	Lespinassière
11201	11250	Leuc
11202	11370	Leucate
11203	11200	Lézignan-Corbières
11204	11240	Lignairolles
11205	11600	Limousis
11206	11300	Limoux
11207	11300	Loupia
11208	11410	La Louvière-Lauragais
11209	11190	Luc-sur-Aude
11210	11200	Luc-sur-Orbieu

INSEE	Postal	Commune
11211	11300	Magrie
11212	11120	Mailhac
11213	11330	Maisons
11214	11300	Malras
11215	11600	Malves-en-Minervois
11216	11300	Malviès
11217	11120	Marcorignan
11218	11410	Marquein
11219	11140	Marsa
11220	11800	Marseillette
11221	11390	Les Martys
11222	11380	Mas-Cabardès
11223	11570	Mas-des-Cours
11224	11330	Massac
11225	11400	Mas-Saintes-Puelles
11226	11420	Mayreville
11227	11220	Mayronnes
11228	11240	Mazerolles-du-Razès
11229	11140	Mazuby
11230	11140	Mérial
11231	11410	Mézerville
11232	11380	Miraval-Cabardes
11233	11120	Mirepeisset
11234	11400	Mireval-Lauragais
11235	11580	Missègre
11236	11420	Molandier
11238	11410	Molleville
11239	11410	Montauriol
11240	11190	Montazels
11241	11700	Montbrun-des-Corbières
11242	11250	Montclar
11243	11320	Montferrand
11244	11140	Montfort-sur-Boulzane
11245	11330	Montgaillard
11246	11240	Montgradail
11247	11240	Monthaut
11248	11800	Montirat
11249	11230	Montjardin
11250	11330	Montjoi
11252	11320	Montmaur
11253	11170	Montolieu
11254	11290	Montréal
11255	11100	Montredon-des-Corbières
11256	11200	Montséret
11257	11800	Monze
11258	11120	Moussan
11259	11170	Moussoulens
11260	11330	Mouthoumet
11261	11700	Moux
11262	11100	Narbonne
11263	11500	Nébias
11264	11200	Névian
11265	11140	Niort-de-Sault
11267	11200	Ornaisons
11268	11270	Orsans
11269	11590	Ouveillan
11270	11350	Padern
11271	11330	Palairac
11272	11570	Palaja
11188	11480	La Palme
11273	11200	Paraza
11274	11300	Pauligne
11275	11410	Payra-sur-l'Hers
11276	11350	Paziols
11277	11420	Pécharic-et-le-Py
11278	11420	Pech-Luna
11279	11610	Pennautier
11280	11700	Pépieux
11281	11150	Pexiora
11282	11230	Peyrefitte-du-Razès
11283	11420	Peyrefitte-sur-l'Hers
11284	11400	Peyrens
11285	11440	Peyriac-de-Mer
11286	11160	Peyriac-Minervois
11287	11190	Peyrolles
11288	11170	Pezens
11289	11300	Pieusse
11290	11420	Plaigne
11291	11270	Plavilla
11292	11400	La Pomarède
11293	11250	Pomas
11294	11300	Pomy
11295	11490	Portel-des-Corbières
11266	11210	Port-la-Nouvelle
11296	11120	Pouzols-Minervois
11297	11380	Pradelles-Cabardès
11299	11250	Preixan
11300	11400	Puginier
11301	11700	Puichéric
11302	11140	Puilaurens
11303	11230	Puivert
11304	11500	Quillan
11305	11360	Quintillan
11306	11500	Quirbajou
11307	11200	Raissac-d'Aude
11308	11170	Raissac-sur-Lampy
11190	11700	La Redorte
11309	11190	Rennes-le-Château
11310	11190	Rennes-les-Bains
11311	11220	Ribaute
11312	11270	Ribouisse
11313	11400	Ricaud
11314	11220	Rieux-en-Val
11315	11160	Rieux-Minervois
11316	11230	Rivel
11317	11140	Rodome
11318	11700	Roquecourbe-Minervois
11319	11380	Roquefère
11320	11340	Roquefeuil
11321	11140	Roquefort-de-Sault
11322	11540	Roquefort-des-Corbières
11323	11300	Roquetaillade-et-Conilhac
11324	11200	Roubia
11325	11250	Rouffiac-d'Aude
11326	11350	Rouffiac-des-Corbières
11327	11290	Roullens
11328	11240	Routier
11330	11800	Rustiques
11331	11270	Saint-Amans
11332	11200	Saint-André-de-Roquelongue
11333	11230	Saint-Benoît
11337	11700	Saint-Couat-d'Aude
11338	11300	Saint-Couat-du-Razès
11339	11310	Saint-Denis
11334	11410	Sainte-Camelle
11335	11140	Sainte-Colombe-sur-Guette
11336	11230	Sainte-Colombe-sur-l'Hers
11340	11170	Sainte-Eulalie
11366	11120	Sainte-Valière
11341	11500	Saint-Ferriol
11342	11800	Saint-Frichoux
11343	11270	Saint-Gaudéric
11344	11250	Saint-Hilaire
11345	11360	Saint-Jean-de-Barrou
11346	11260	Saint-Jean-de-Paracol
11347	11500	Saint-Julia-de-Bec
11348	11270	Saint-Julien-de-Briola
11350	11500	Saint-Just-et-le-Bézu
11351	11220	Saint-Laurent-de-la-Cabrerisse
11352	11500	Saint-Louis-et-Parahou
11353	11120	Saint-Marcel-sur-Aude
11354	11220	Saint-Martin-des-Puits
11355	11300	Saint-Martin-de-Villereglan
11356	11400	Saint-Martin-Lalande
11357	11170	Saint-Martin-le-Vieil
11358	11500	Saint-Martin-Lys
11359	11410	Saint-Michel-de-Lanès
11360	11120	Saint-Nazaire-d'Aude
11361	11400	Saint-Papoul
11362	11320	Saint-Paulet
11363	11220	Saint-Pierre-des-Champs
11364	11300	Saint-Polycarpe
11365	11420	Saint-Sernin
11367	11310	Saissac
11368	11600	Sallèles-Cabardès
11369	11590	Sallèles-d'Aude
11370	11110	Salles-d'Aude
11371	11410	Salles-sur-l'Hers
11372	11600	Salsigne
11373	11140	Salvezines
11374	11330	Salza
11375	11240	Seignalens
11376	11190	La Serpent
11377	11190	Serres
11378	11220	Serviès-en-Val
11379	11130	Sigean
11380	11230	Sonnac-sur-l'Hers
11381	11190	Sougraigne
11382	11400	Souilhanels
11383	11400	Souilhe
11384	11350	Soulatgé
11385	11320	Soupex
11386	11220	Talairan
11387	11220	Taurize
11388	11330	Termes
11389	11580	Terroles
11390	11200	Thézan-des-Corbières
11391	11380	La Tourette-Cabardès
11392	11220	Tournissan
11393	11200	Tourouzelle
11394	11300	Tourreilles
11395	11160	Trassanel
11396	11160	Trausse
11397	11800	Trèbes
11398	11510	Treilles
11399	11400	Tréville
11400	11230	Tréziers
11401	11350	Tuchan
11251	11220	Val-de-Dagne
11080	11230	Val-de-Lambronne
11131	11260	Val-du-Faby
11402	11580	Valmigère
11404	11610	Ventenac-Cabardès
11405	11120	Ventenac-en-Minervois
11406	11580	Véraza
11407	11400	Verdun-en-Lauragais
11408	11250	Verzeille
11409	11330	Vignevieille
11410	11600	Villalier
11411	11600	Villanière
11412	11580	Villardebelle
11413	11600	Villardonnel
11414	11220	Villar-en-Val
11415	11250	Villar-Saint-Anselme
11416	11600	Villarzel-Cabardès
11417	11300	Villarzel-du-Razès
11418	11150	Villasavary
11419	11420	Villautou
11420	11250	Villebazy
11421	11200	Villedaigne
11422	11800	Villedubert
11423	11570	Villefloure
11424	11230	Villefort
11425	11600	Villegailhenc
11426	11600	Villegly
11427	11300	Villelongue-d'Aude
11428	11310	Villemagne
11429	11620	Villemoustaussou
11430	11400	Villeneuve-la-Comptal
11431	11360	Villeneuve-les-Corbières
11432	11290	Villeneuve-lès-Montréal
11433	11160	Villeneuve-Minervois
11434	11150	Villepinte
11435	11330	Villerouge-Termenès
11436	11360	Villesèque-des-Corbières
11437	11170	Villesèquelande
11438	11150	Villesiscle
11439	11170	Villespy
11440	11220	Villetritouls
11441	11110	Vinassan
