= Belcaire =

Commune in Occitanie, France

- Commune
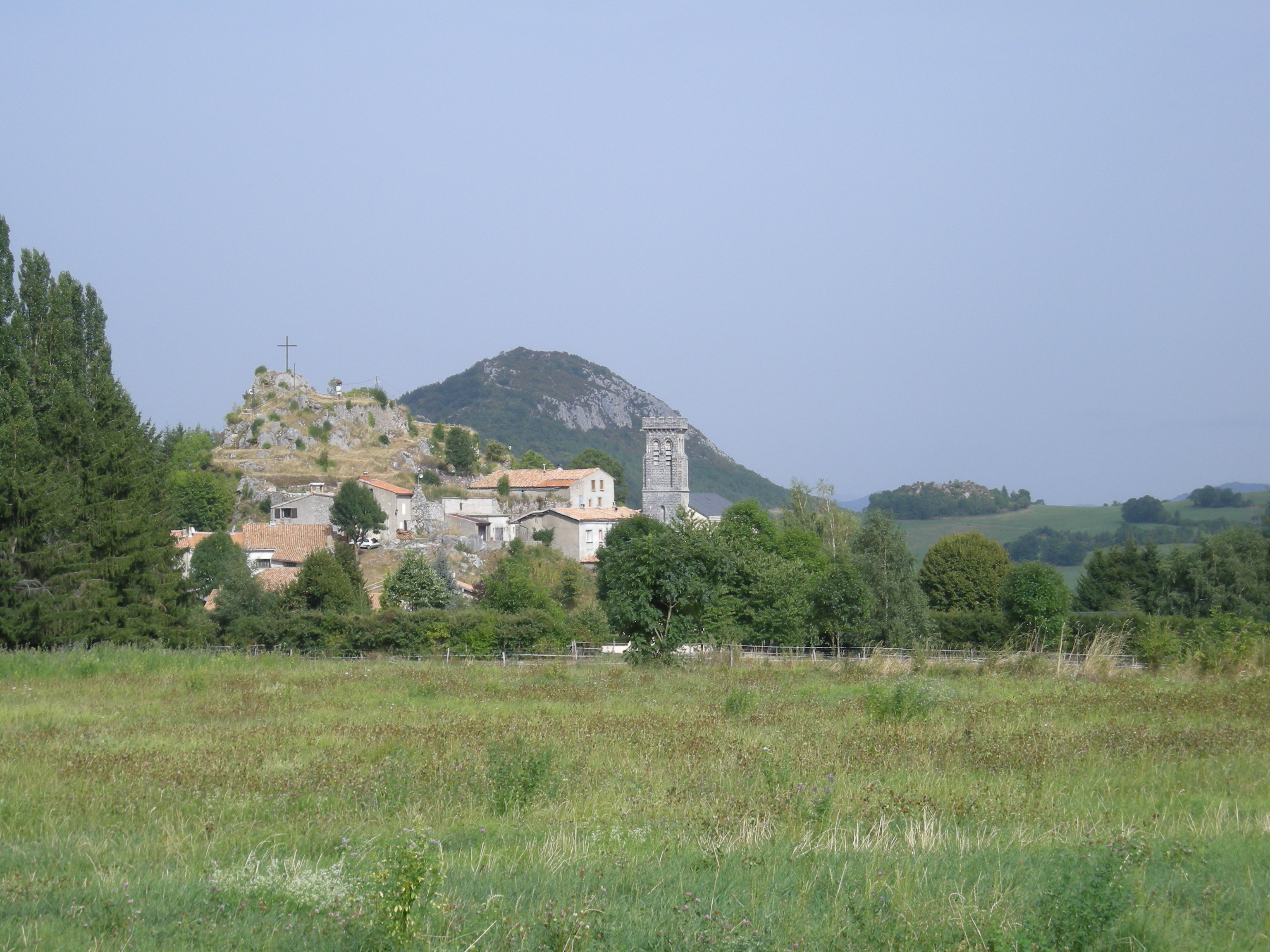
- A general view of Belcaire

- Coat of arms
- Location of Belcaire
- Location within France Location within Occitanie
- Coordinates: 42°48′58″N 1°57′25″E
- Country: France
- Region: Occitania
- Department: Aude
- Arrondissement: Limoux
- Canton: La Haute-Vallée de l'Aude

Government
  - Mayor (2023–2026): Jean-Pierre Adroit
- Area^{1}: 30.68 km^{2} (11.85 sq mi)
- Elevation: 1,052 m (3,451 ft)
- Highest elevation: 1,546 m (5,072 ft)
- Lowest elevation: 696 m (2,283 ft)
- Population (2023): 365
  - Density: 11.9/km^{2} (30.8/sq mi)
- Time zone: UTC+01:00 (CET)
  - Summer (DST): UTC+02:00 (CEST)
- INSEE/Postal code: 11028 /11340
- ^{1} French Land Register data, which excludes lakes, ponds, glaciers > 1 km^{2} (0.386 sq mi or 247 acres) and river estuaries.

Belcaire (French pronunciation: [bɛlkɛʁ]; Occitan: Bèlcaire) is a commune in the Aude department, part of the ancient Languedoc province and the present-day Occitanie region in southern France.

== Population ==
Historical population
Year	Pop.	±% p.a.
1968	504	—
1975	463	−1.20%
1982	421	−1.35%
1990	360	−1.94%
1999	392	+0.95%
2007	411	+0.59%
2012	461	+2.32%
2017	394	−3.09%
2023	365	−1.27%
Source: INSEE

== Climate ==
On average, Belcaire experiences 77.2 days per year with a minimum temperature below 0 °C (32.0 °F), 1.2 days per year with a minimum temperature below −10 °C (14.0 °F), 7.0 days per year with a maximum temperature below 0 °C (32.0 °F), and 5.6 days per year with a maximum temperature above 30 °C (86.0 °F). The record high temperature was 36.4 °C (97.5 °F) on 18 July 2023, while the record low temperature was −17.0 °C (1.4 °F) on 16 January 1985.

Climate data for Belcaire (1991–2020 normals, extremes 1979–present)
Month	Jan	Feb	Mar	Apr	May	Jun	Jul	Aug	Sep	Oct	Nov	Dec	Year
Record high °C (°F)	21.5 (70.7)	23.1 (73.6)	25.0 (77.0)	26.6 (79.9)	32.2 (90.0)	35.4 (95.7)	36.4 (97.5)	35.0 (95.0)	33.0 (91.4)	29.7 (85.5)	24.0 (75.2)	21.6 (70.9)	36.4 (97.5)
Mean daily maximum °C (°F)	7.7 (45.9)	7.9 (46.2)	10.6 (51.1)	12.6 (54.7)	16.2 (61.2)	20.0 (68.0)	22.6 (72.7)	23.0 (73.4)	19.3 (66.7)	15.9 (60.6)	10.8 (51.4)	8.5 (47.3)	14.6 (58.3)
Daily mean °C (°F)	3.3 (37.9)	3.4 (38.1)	6.0 (42.8)	7.9 (46.2)	11.4 (52.5)	15.1 (59.2)	17.4 (63.3)	17.7 (63.9)	14.3 (57.7)	11.0 (51.8)	6.3 (43.3)	4.1 (39.4)	9.8 (49.6)
Mean daily minimum °C (°F)	−1.1 (30.0)	−1.0 (30.2)	1.3 (34.3)	3.1 (37.6)	6.6 (43.9)	10.2 (50.4)	12.2 (54.0)	12.4 (54.3)	9.3 (48.7)	6.1 (43.0)	1.8 (35.2)	−0.3 (31.5)	5.0 (41.0)
Record low °C (°F)	−17.0 (1.4)	−15.6 (3.9)	−14.3 (6.3)	−5.8 (21.6)	−3.0 (26.6)	1.0 (33.8)	5.0 (41.0)	3.5 (38.3)	1.4 (34.5)	−4.5 (23.9)	−10.1 (13.8)	−13.0 (8.6)	−17.0 (1.4)
Average precipitation mm (inches)	100.3 (3.95)	77.8 (3.06)	79.3 (3.12)	108.5 (4.27)	108.4 (4.27)	83.1 (3.27)	53.5 (2.11)	57.6 (2.27)	73.2 (2.88)	84.2 (3.31)	114.1 (4.49)	92.4 (3.64)	1,032.4 (40.65)
Average precipitation days (≥ 1.0 mm)	10.9	10.4	10.1	12.0	11.8	9.4	7.3	7.7	8.5	9.6	11.4	10.3	119.4
Source: Meteociel

== See also ==
- Communes of the Aude department
