= Saint-Louis-et-Parahou =

Commune in Occitanie, France

- Commune
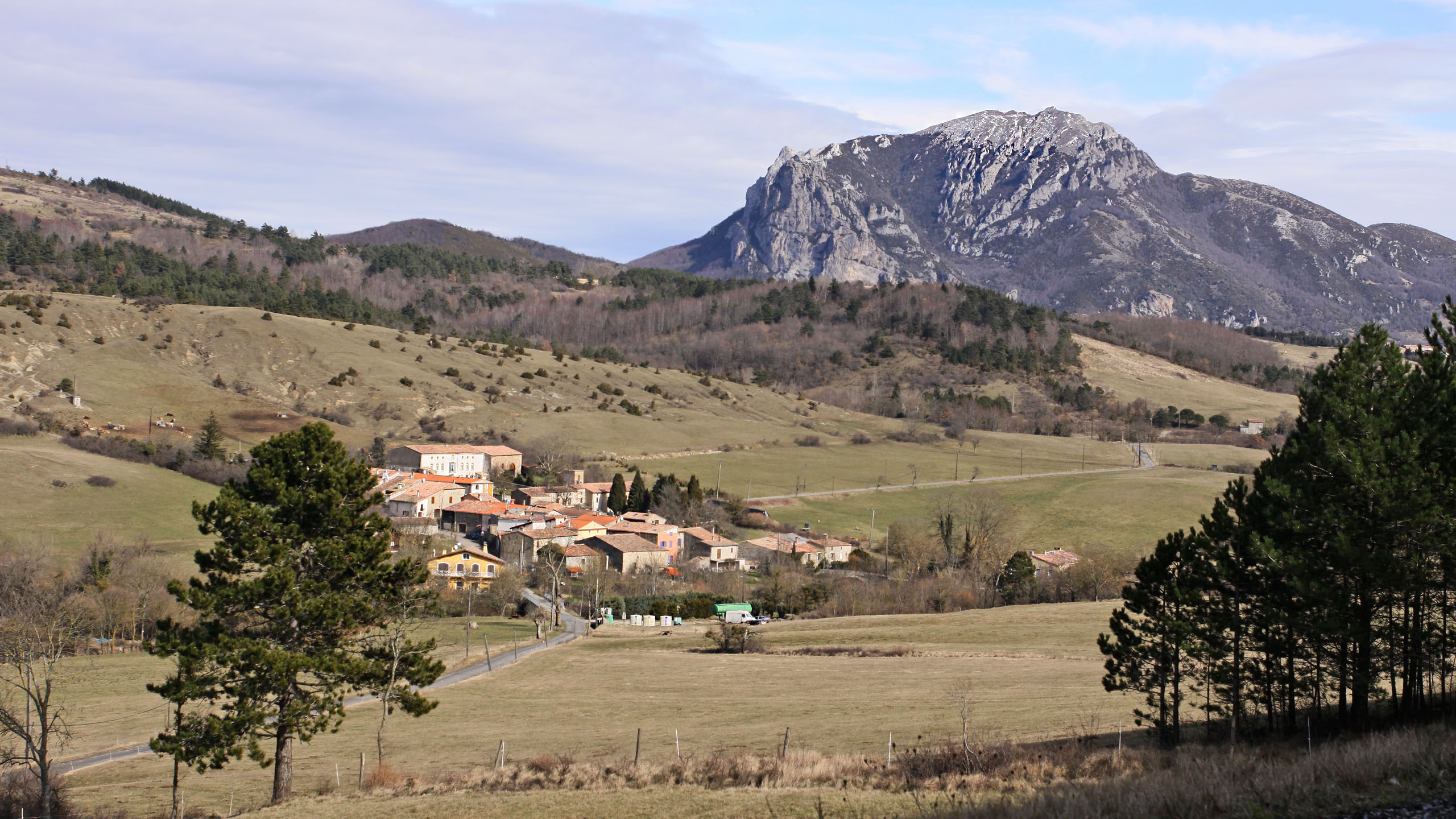

- Coat of arms
- Location of Saint-Louis-et-Parahou
- Location within France Location within Occitanie
- Coordinates: 42°50′54″N 2°19′11″E
- Country: France
- Region: Occitania
- Department: Aude
- Arrondissement: Limoux
- Canton: La Haute-Vallée de l'Aude

Government
  - Mayor (2020–2026): Marielle Bastou
- Area^{1}: 15.61 km^{2} (6.03 sq mi)
- Elevation: 615 m (2,018 ft)
- Highest elevation: 1,007 m (3,304 ft)
- Lowest elevation: 519 m (1,703 ft)
- Population (2023): 55
  - Density: 3.5/km^{2} (9.1/sq mi)
- Time zone: UTC+01:00 (CET)
  - Summer (DST): UTC+02:00 (CEST)
- INSEE/Postal code: 11352 /11500
- ^{1} French Land Register data, which excludes lakes, ponds, glaciers > 1 km^{2} (0.386 sq mi or 247 acres) and river estuaries.

Saint-Louis-et-Parahou (French pronunciation: [sɛ̃ lwi e paʁau]; Languedocien: Sant Loís e Paraon) is a commune in the Aude department in southern France.

== Population ==
Historical population
Year	Pop.	±% p.a.
1968	66	—
1975	41	−6.58%
1982	47	+1.97%
1990	42	−1.40%
1999	35	−2.01%
2007	57	+6.29%
2012	62	+1.70%
2017	55	−2.37%
2023	55	+0.00%
Source: INSEE

== See also ==
- Communes of the Aude department
