= Peyrefitte-sur-l'Hers =

Commune in Occitanie, France

- Commune
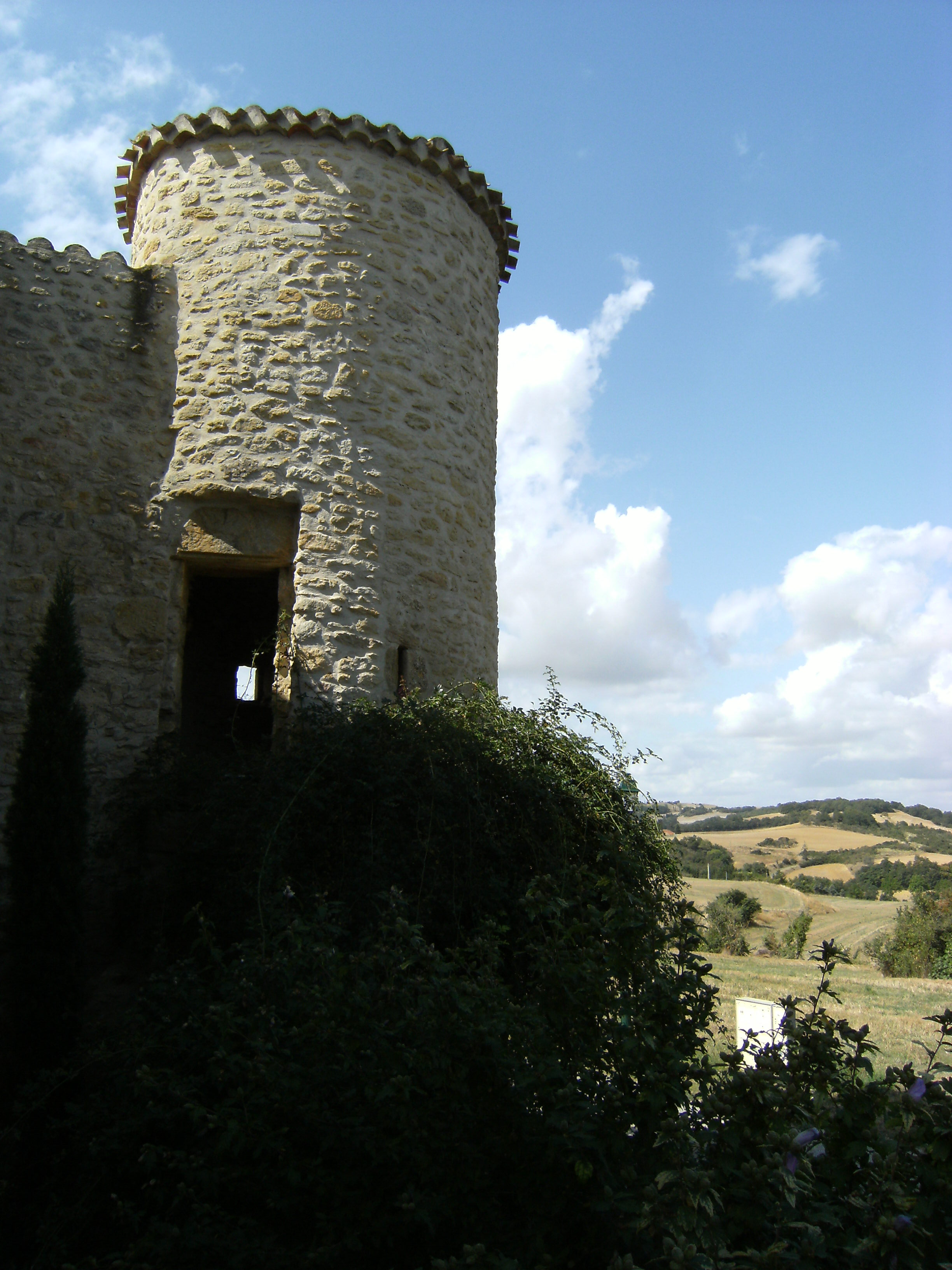
- The tower in Peyrefitte-sur-l'Hers

- Coat of arms
- Location of Peyrefitte-sur-l'Hers
- Location within France Location within Occitanie
- Coordinates: 43°15′N 1°50′E
- Country: France
- Region: Occitania
- Department: Aude
- Arrondissement: Carcassonne
- Canton: La Piège au Razès

Government
  - Mayor (2022–2026): Hubert Naudinat
- Area^{1}: 6.47 km^{2} (2.50 sq mi)
- Elevation: 322 m (1,056 ft)
- Highest elevation: 351 m (1,152 ft)
- Lowest elevation: 235 m (771 ft)
- Population (2023): 75
  - Density: 12/km^{2} (30/sq mi)
- Time zone: UTC+01:00 (CET)
  - Summer (DST): UTC+02:00 (CEST)
- INSEE/Postal code: 11283 /11410
- ^{1} French Land Register data, which excludes lakes, ponds, glaciers > 1 km^{2} (0.386 sq mi or 247 acres) and river estuaries.

Peyrefitte-sur-l'Hers (French pronunciation: [pɛʁfit syʁ lɛʁs], literally Peyrefitte on the Hers; Occitan: Pèirafita) is a commune in the Aude department in southern France.

== Population ==
Historical population
| Year | Pop. | ±% p.a. |
|---|---|---|
| 1968 | 64 | — |
| 1975 | 65 | +0.22% |
| 1982 | 64 | −0.22% |
| 1990 | 56 | −1.66% |
| 1999 | 58 | +0.39% |
| 2007 | 72 | +2.74% |
| 2012 | 73 | +0.28% |
| 2017 | 75 | +0.54% |
| 2023 | 75 | +0.00% |
Source: INSEE

== See also ==
- Communes of the Aude department
