= Sainte-Colombe-sur-l'Hers =

Commune in Occitanie, France

- Commune
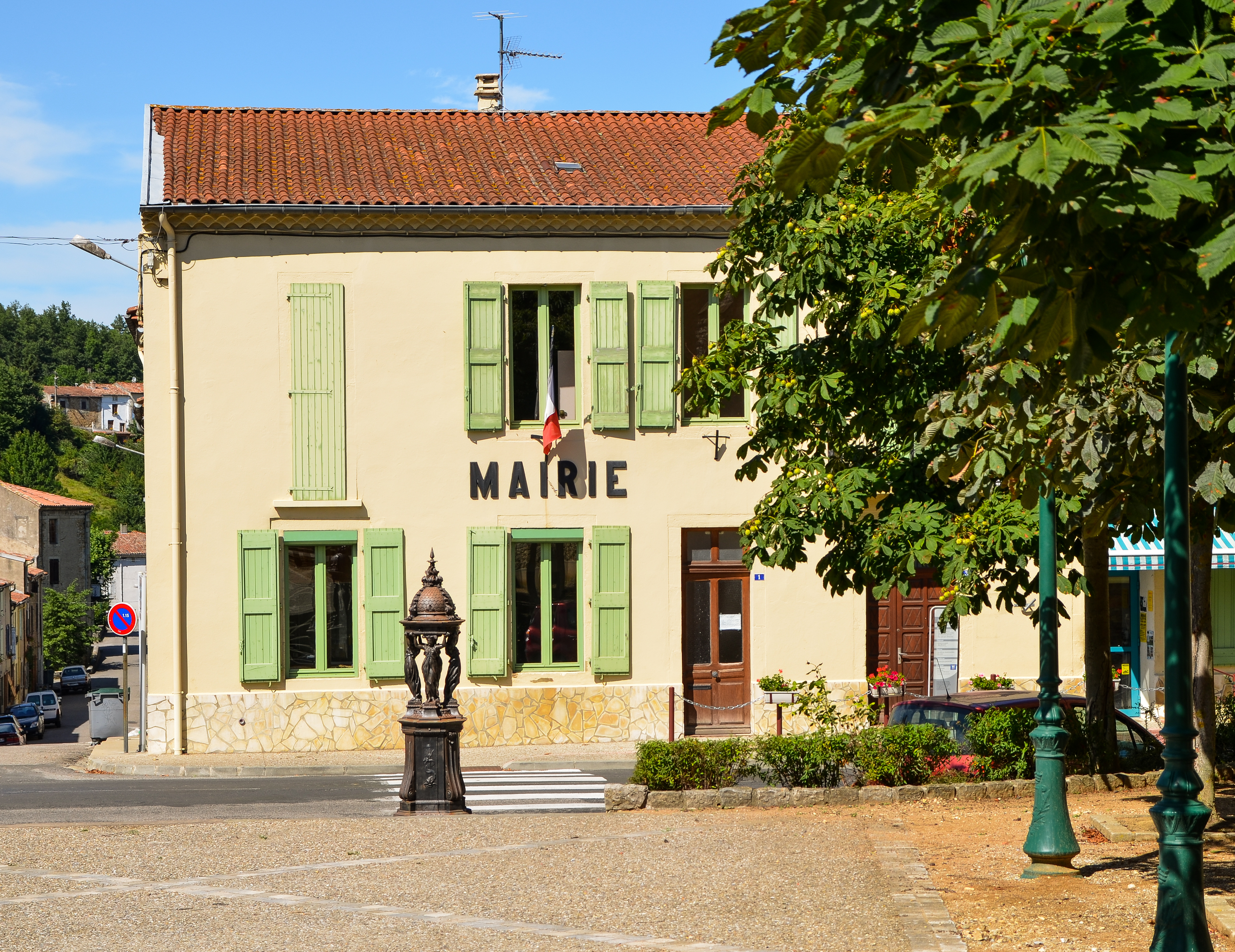
- The town hall in Sainte-Colombe-sur-l'Hers

- Coat of arms
- Location of Sainte-Colombe-sur-l'Hers
- Location within France Location within Occitanie
- Coordinates: 42°57′12″N 1°58′01″E
- Country: France
- Region: Occitania
- Department: Aude
- Arrondissement: Limoux
- Canton: La Haute-Vallée de l'Aude

Government
  - Mayor (2020–2026): Thierry Couteau
- Area^{1}: 10.61 km^{2} (4.10 sq mi)
- Elevation: 400 m (1,300 ft)
- Highest elevation: 764 m (2,507 ft)
- Lowest elevation: 389 m (1,276 ft)
- Population (2023): 441
  - Density: 41.6/km^{2} (108/sq mi)
- Time zone: UTC+01:00 (CET)
  - Summer (DST): UTC+02:00 (CEST)
- INSEE/Postal code: 11336 /11230
- ^{1} French Land Register data, which excludes lakes, ponds, glaciers > 1 km^{2} (0.386 sq mi or 247 acres) and river estuaries.

Sainte-Colombe-sur-l'Hers (French pronunciation: [sɛ̃t kɔlɔ̃b syʁ lɛʁs], literally Sainte-Colombe on the Hers; Languedocien: Santa Colomba d'Ers or Santa Colomba d'Èrs) is a commune in the Aude department in southern France.

== Population ==
Historical population
Year	Pop.	±% p.a.
1968	603	—
1975	544	−1.46%
1982	534	−0.26%
1990	530	−0.09%
1999	539	+0.19%
2007	514	−0.59%
2012	494	−0.79%
2017	435	−2.51%
2023	441	+0.23%
Source: INSEE

== See also ==
- Communes of the Aude department
