= Comus, Aude =

Commune in Occitanie, France

Comus
- Commune
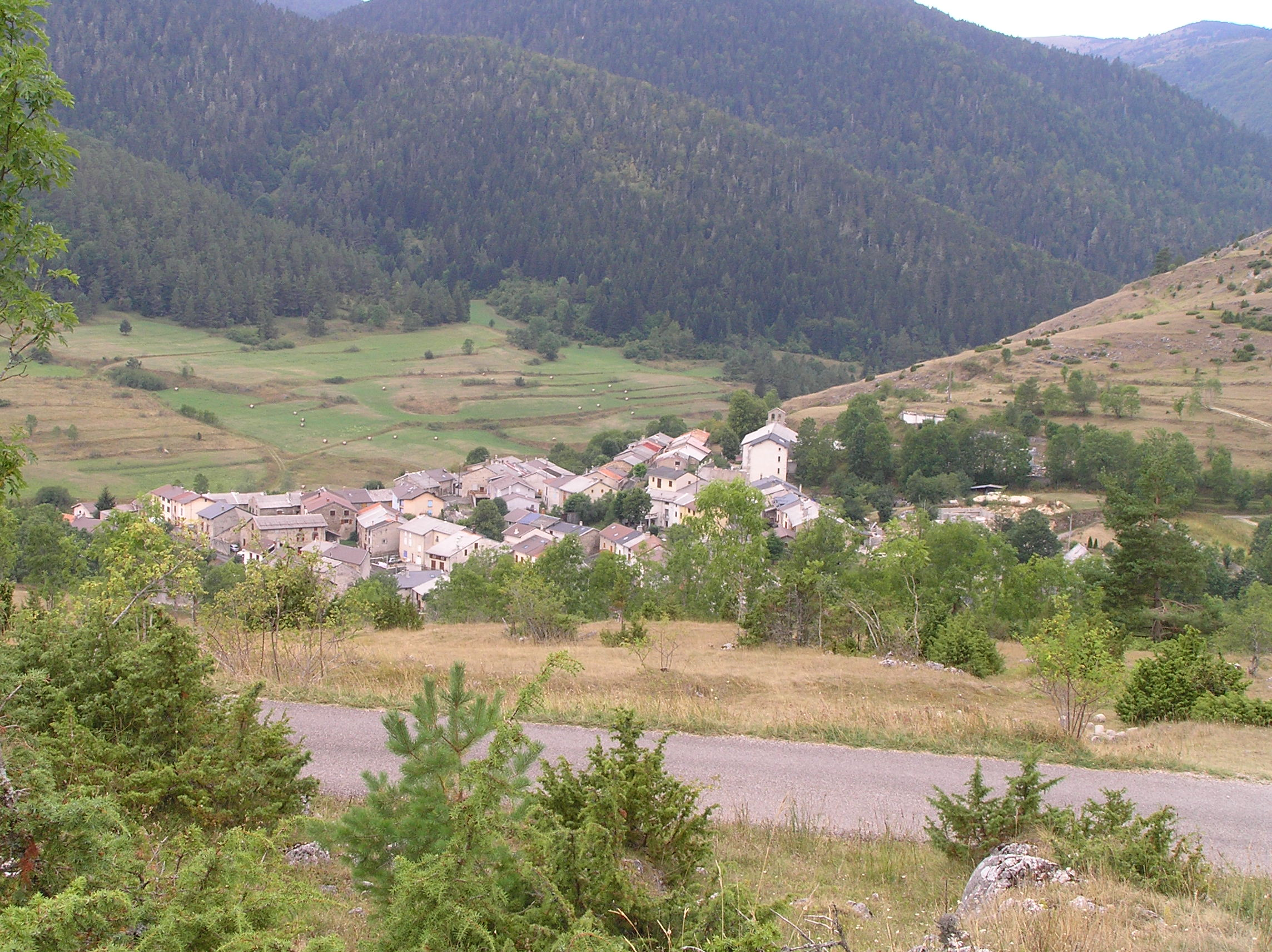
- A general view of Comus

- Coat of arms
- Location of Comus
- Location within France Location within Occitanie
- Coordinates: 42°48′48″N 1°53′28″E
- Country: France
- Region: Occitania
- Department: Aude
- Arrondissement: Limoux
- Canton: La Haute-Vallée de l'Aude

Government
  - Mayor (2020–2026): Jean-Claude Pélofi
- Area^{1}: 14.07 km^{2} (5.43 sq mi)
- Elevation: 1,150 m (3,770 ft)
- Highest elevation: 1,623 m (5,325 ft)
- Lowest elevation: 612 m (2,008 ft)
- Population (2023): 33
  - Density: 2.3/km^{2} (6.1/sq mi)
- Time zone: UTC+01:00 (CET)
  - Summer (DST): UTC+02:00 (CEST)
- INSEE/Postal code: 11096 /11340
- ^{1} French Land Register data, which excludes lakes, ponds, glaciers > 1 km^{2} (0.386 sq mi or 247 acres) and river estuaries.

Comus is a commune in the Aude department in southern France.

== Population ==
Historical population
| Year | Pop. | ±% p.a. |
|---|---|---|
| 1968 | 127 | — |
| 1975 | 96 | −3.92% |
| 1982 | 67 | −5.01% |
| 1990 | 46 | −4.59% |
| 1999 | 39 | −1.82% |
| 2007 | 45 | +1.80% |
| 2012 | 29 | −8.41% |
| 2017 | 43 | +8.20% |
| 2023 | 33 | −4.32% |
Source: INSEE

== See also ==
- Communes of the Aude department
