= Lazare Escarguel =

French politician (1816–1893)

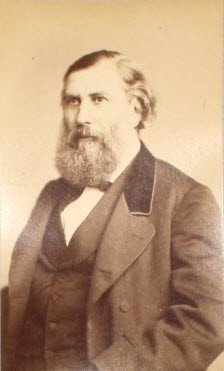
- Lazare Escarguel

French Senator
- In office 1882–1891

Member of the National Assembly of France
- In office 1871–1882

Mayor of Perpignan
- In office 1870–1874
- Preceded by: Joseph Tournal
- Succeeded by: Joseph Tournal

Personal details
- Born: 23 March 1816 Routier, France
- Died: 26 May 1893 (aged 77) Routier, France
- Party: Republican Union

Lazare Escarguel (1816–1893) was a French politician and newspaper editor.

== Biography ==
Elected as a councillor in Perpignan in 1865, Lazare Escarguel became the mayor of that city in 1870. The following year, he was elected as a member of the National Assembly for Pyrénées-Orientales, and was reelected in 1876, 1877 (against Colonel Falcon with 13,235 votes vs 8,276) and in 1881. Escarguel is then elected as a senator for Pyrénées-Orientales from 1882 to 1891. He finally retired in his birth town, where he died in 1893 of apoplexy.

Lazare Escarguel was also a founding member of the newspaper L'Indépendant for its second start in 1868.
