= Bessède-de-Sault =

Commune in Occitanie, France

- Commune
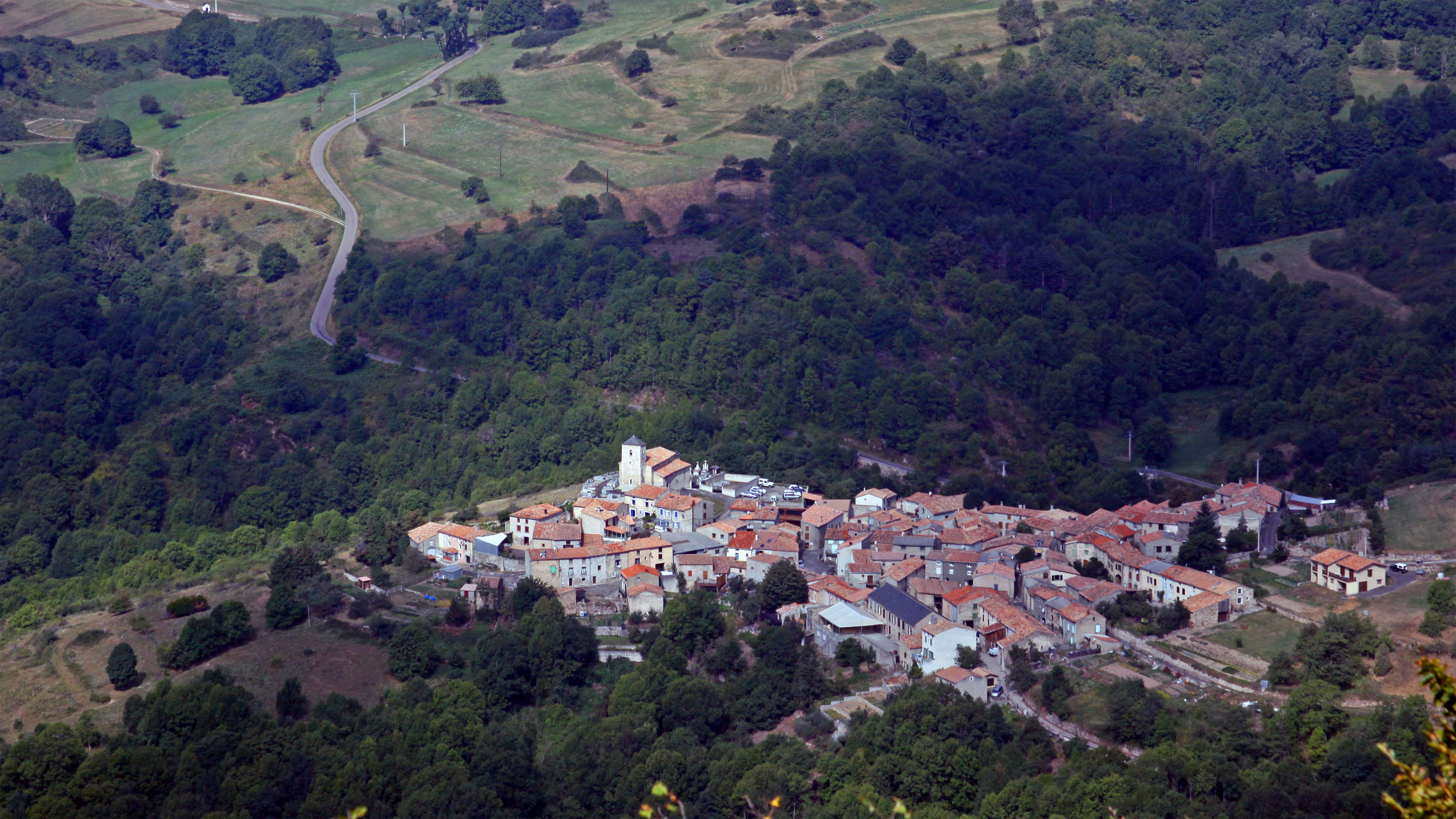
- The southern view of Bessède-de-Sault

- Coat of arms
- Location of Bessède-de-Sault
- Location within France Location within Occitanie
- Coordinates: 42°47′22″N 2°07′34″E
- Country: France
- Region: Occitania
- Department: Aude
- Arrondissement: Limoux
- Canton: La Haute-Vallée de l'Aude
- Intercommunality: Pyrénées Audoises

Government
  - Mayor (2020–2026): Sébastien Daigneaux
- Area^{1}: 15.04 km^{2} (5.81 sq mi)
- Elevation: 941 m (3,087 ft)
- Highest elevation: 1,412 m (4,633 ft)
- Lowest elevation: 512 m (1,680 ft)
- Population (2023): 63
  - Density: 4.2/km^{2} (11/sq mi)
- Time zone: UTC+01:00 (CET)
  - Summer (DST): UTC+02:00 (CEST)
- INSEE/Postal code: 11038 /11140
- ^{1} French Land Register data, which excludes lakes, ponds, glaciers > 1 km^{2} (0.386 sq mi or 247 acres) and river estuaries.

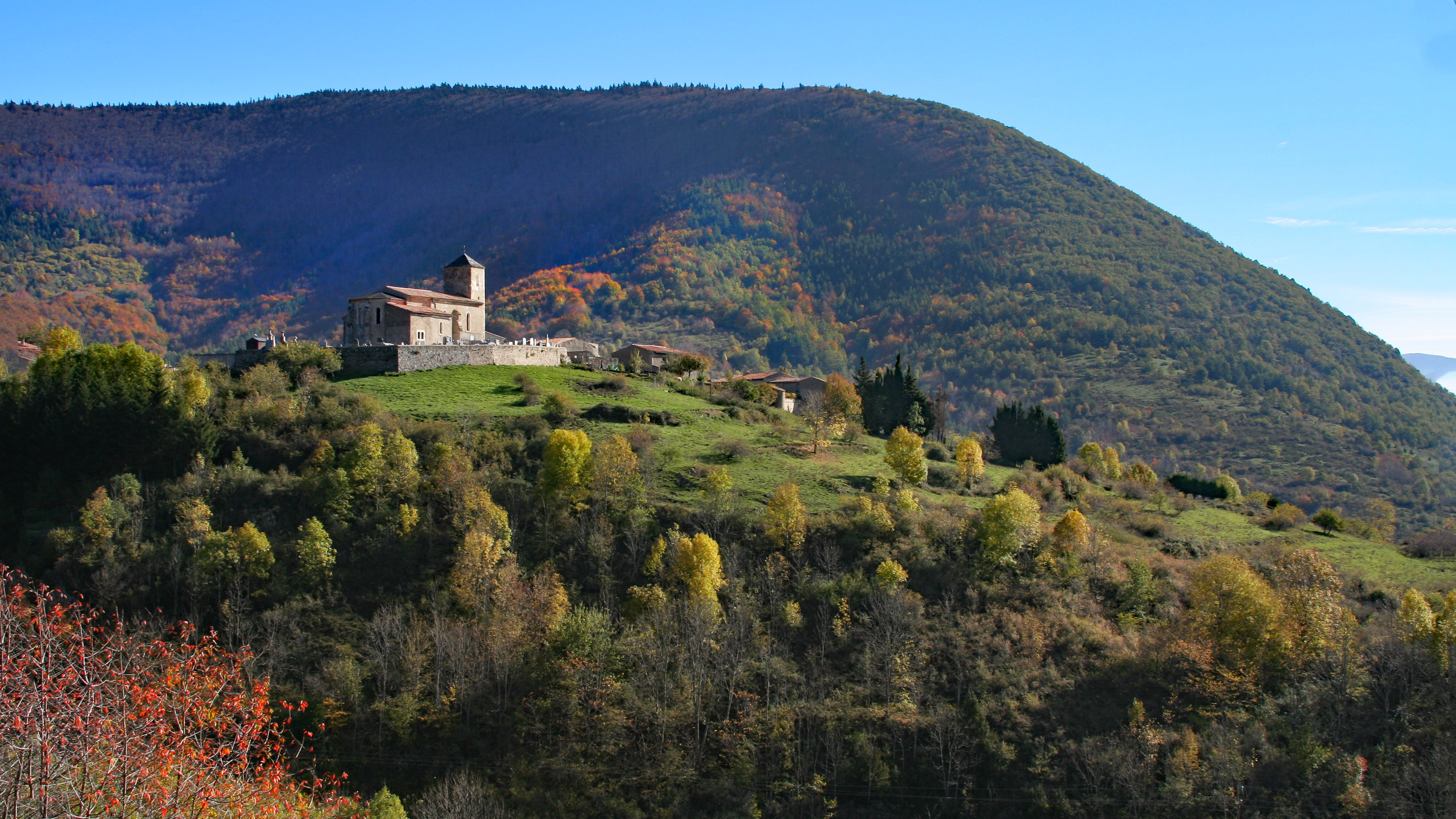
The view of a church in Bessède-de-Sault

Bessède-de-Sault (French pronunciation: [bɛsɛd də so]; Languedocien: Beceda de Saut) is a commune in the Aude department in southern France.

== Population ==
Historical population
| Year | Pop. | ±% p.a. |
|---|---|---|
| 1968 | 100 | — |
| 1975 | 73 | −4.40% |
| 1982 | 77 | +0.76% |
| 1990 | 56 | −3.90% |
| 1999 | 52 | −0.82% |
| 2007 | 53 | +0.24% |
| 2012 | 59 | +2.17% |
| 2017 | 47 | −4.45% |
| 2023 | 63 | +5.00% |
Source: INSEE

== See also ==
- Communes of the Aude department
