= Mazerolles-du-Razès =

Commune in Occitanie, France

- Commune
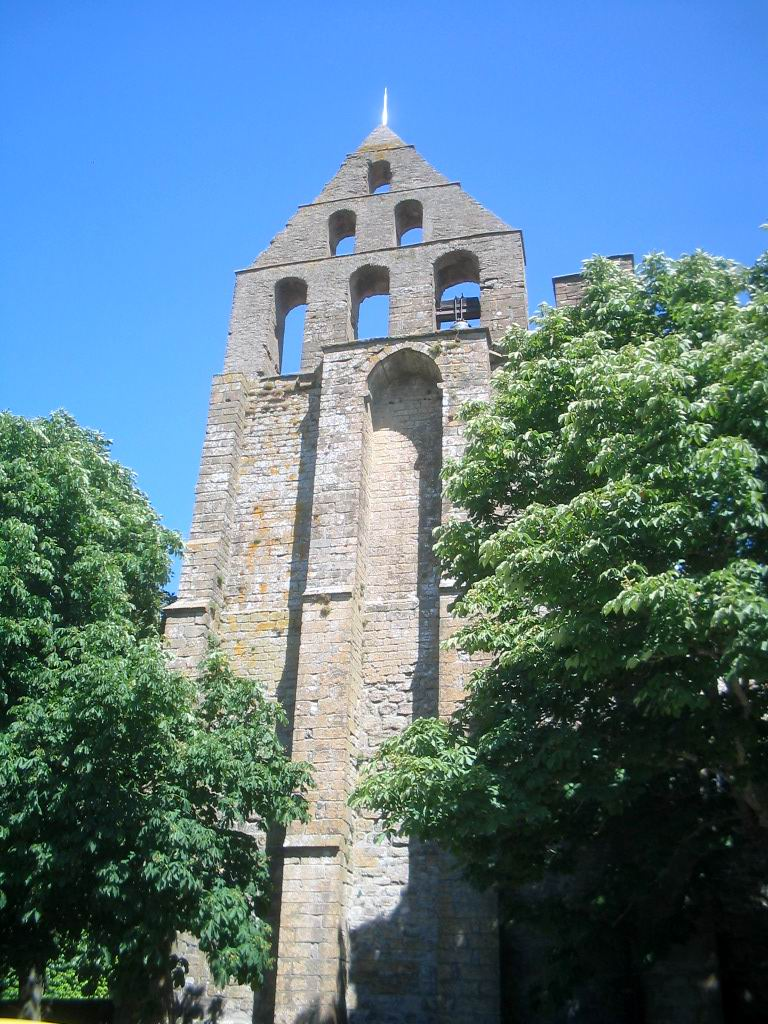
- The church in Mazerolles-du-Razès

- Coat of arms
- Location of Mazerolles-du-Razès
- Location within France Location within Occitanie
- Coordinates: 43°08′22″N 2°04′21″E
- Country: France
- Region: Occitania
- Department: Aude
- Arrondissement: Limoux
- Canton: La Piège au Razès

Government
  - Mayor (2020–2026): Jean-Pierre Gleizes
- Area^{1}: 8.22 km^{2} (3.17 sq mi)
- Elevation: 234 m (768 ft)
- Highest elevation: 320 m (1,050 ft)
- Lowest elevation: 219 m (719 ft)
- Population (2023): 157
  - Density: 19.1/km^{2} (49.5/sq mi)
- Time zone: UTC+01:00 (CET)
  - Summer (DST): UTC+02:00 (CEST)
- INSEE/Postal code: 11228 /11240
- ^{1} French Land Register data, which excludes lakes, ponds, glaciers > 1 km^{2} (0.386 sq mi or 247 acres) and river estuaries.

Mazerolles-du-Razès (French pronunciation: [mazʁɔl dy ʁazɛs]; Occitan: Maseròlas) is a commune in the Aude department in southern France.

== Population ==
Historical population
Year	Pop.	±% p.a.
1968	265	—
1975	213	−3.07%
1982	180	−2.38%
1990	179	−0.07%
1999	181	+0.12%
2007	173	−0.56%
2012	180	+0.80%
2017	154	−3.07%
2023	157	+0.32%
Source: INSEE

== See also ==
- Communes of the Aude department
