= Villarzel-du-Razès =

Commune in Occitanie, France

- Commune
- Coat of arms
- Location of Villarzel-du-Razès
- Location within France Location within Occitanie
- Coordinates: 43°08′24″N 2°12′27″E
- Country: France
- Region: Occitania
- Department: Aude
- Arrondissement: Limoux
- Canton: La Piège au Razès

Government
  - Mayor (2020–2026): Guy Vimal du Monteil
- Area^{1}: 12.6 km^{2} (4.9 sq mi)
- Elevation: 280 m (920 ft)
- Highest elevation: 446 m (1,463 ft)
- Lowest elevation: 215 m (705 ft)
- Population (2023): 100
  - Density: 7.9/km^{2} (21/sq mi)
- Time zone: UTC+01:00 (CET)
  - Summer (DST): UTC+02:00 (CEST)
- INSEE/Postal code: 11417 /11300
- ^{1} French Land Register data, which excludes lakes, ponds, glaciers > 1 km^{2} (0.386 sq mi or 247 acres) and river estuaries.

Villarzel-du-Razès (French pronunciation: [vilaʁzɛl dy ʁazɛs]; Languedocien: Vilarzèl de Rasés) is a commune in the Aude department in southern France.

== Population ==
Historical population
Year	Pop.	±% p.a.
1968	120	—
1975	108	−1.49%
1982	109	+0.13%
1990	89	−2.50%
1999	91	+0.25%
2007	89	−0.28%
2012	103	+2.96%
2017	103	+0.00%
2023	100	−0.49%
Source: INSEE

== See also ==
- Communes of the Aude department
