= Le Clat =

Commune in Occitanie, France

- Commune
- Coat of arms
- Location of Le Clat
- Location within France Location within Occitanie
- Coordinates: 42°47′12″N 2°10′06″E
- Country: France
- Region: Occitania
- Department: Aude
- Arrondissement: Limoux
- Canton: La Haute-Vallée de l'Aude
- Intercommunality: Pyrénées Audoises

Government
  - Mayor (2020–2026): Honoré Gervais
- Area^{1}: 10.25 km^{2} (3.96 sq mi)
- Elevation: 1,086 m (3,563 ft)
- Highest elevation: 1,394 m (4,573 ft)
- Lowest elevation: 466 m (1,529 ft)
- Population (2023): 28
  - Density: 2.7/km^{2} (7.1/sq mi)
- Time zone: UTC+01:00 (CET)
  - Summer (DST): UTC+02:00 (CEST)
- INSEE/Postal code: 11093 /11140
- ^{1} French Land Register data, which excludes lakes, ponds, glaciers > 1 km^{2} (0.386 sq mi or 247 acres) and river estuaries.

Le Clat is a commune in the Aude department in southern France.

== Population ==
Historical population
Year	Pop.	±% p.a.
1968	66	—
1975	50	−3.89%
1982	46	−1.18%
1990	43	−0.84%
1999	33	−2.90%
2007	36	+1.09%
2012	34	−1.14%
2017	31	−1.83%
2023	28	−1.68%
Source: INSEE

== See also ==
- Communes of the Aude department
