= Belfort-sur-Rebenty =

Commune in Occitanie, France

- Commune
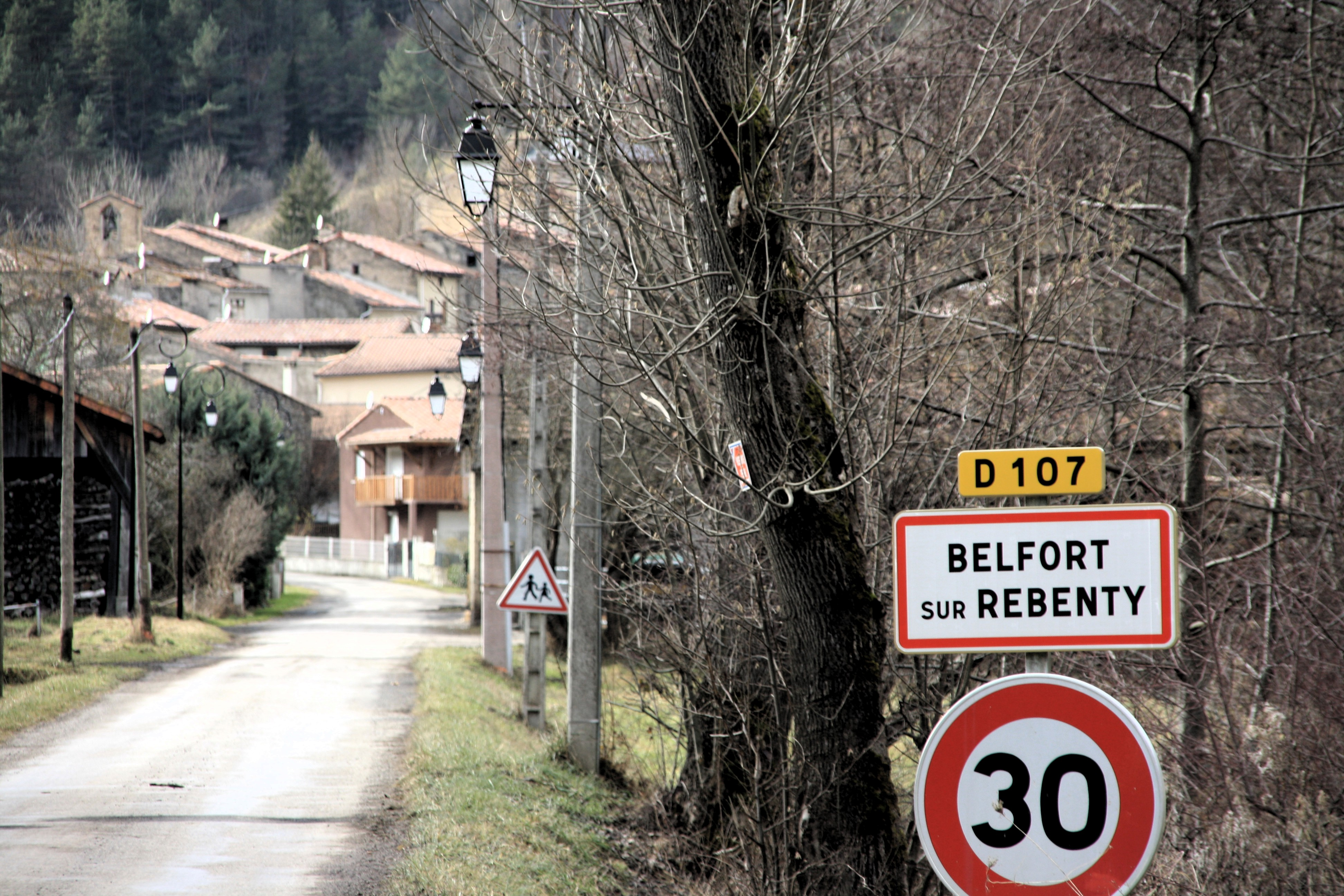
- The village entrance

- Coat of arms
- Location of Belfort-sur-Rebenty
- Location within France Location within Occitanie
- Coordinates: 42°49′36″N 2°02′55″E
- Country: France
- Region: Occitania
- Department: Aude
- Arrondissement: Limoux
- Canton: La Haute-Vallée de l'Aude

Government
  - Mayor (2020–2026): Lucien Rivie
- Area^{1}: 5.24 km^{2} (2.02 sq mi)
- Elevation: 710 m (2,330 ft)
- Highest elevation: 932 m (3,058 ft)
- Lowest elevation: 680 m (2,230 ft)
- Population (2023): 25
  - Density: 4.8/km^{2} (12/sq mi)
- Time zone: UTC+01:00 (CET)
  - Summer (DST): UTC+02:00 (CEST)
- INSEE/Postal code: 11031 /11140
- ^{1} French Land Register data, which excludes lakes, ponds, glaciers > 1 km^{2} (0.386 sq mi or 247 acres) and river estuaries.

Belfort-sur-Rebenty (Languedocien: Bèlfort de Rebentin) is a commune in the Aude department in southern France.

== Population ==
Historical population
Year	Pop.	±% p.a.
1968	66	—
1975	52	−3.35%
1982	42	−3.00%
1990	40	−0.61%
1999	37	−0.86%
2007	39	+0.66%
2012	39	+0.00%
2017	26	−7.79%
2023	25	−0.65%
Source: INSEE

== See also ==
- Communes of the Aude department
