= Fontanès-de-Sault =

Commune in Occitanie, France

- Commune
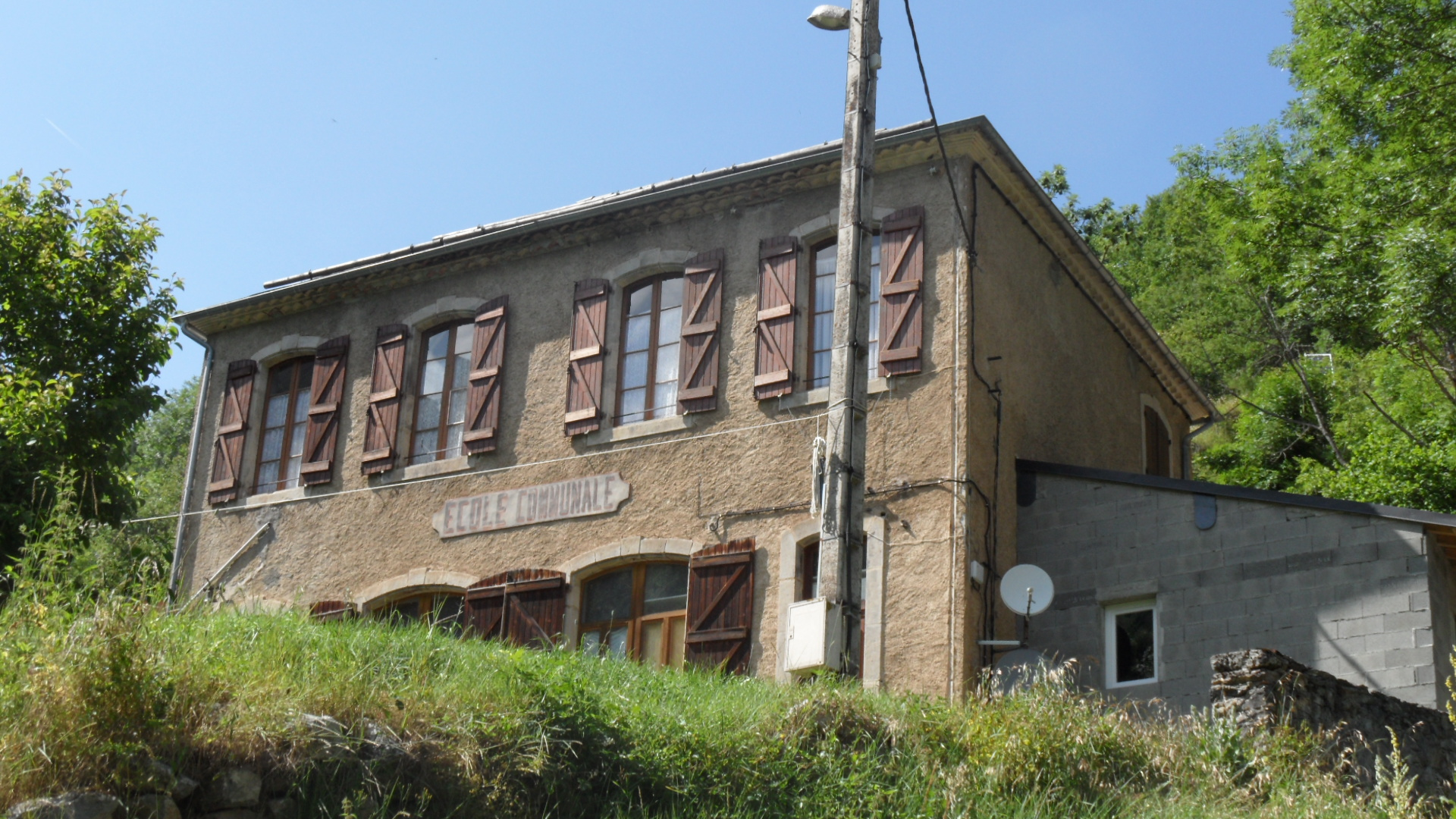
- The town hall in Fontanès-de-Sault

- Coat of arms
- Location of Fontanès-de-Sault
- Location within France Location within Occitanie
- Coordinates: 42°46′10″N 2°04′57″E
- Country: France
- Region: Occitania
- Department: Aude
- Arrondissement: Limoux
- Canton: La Haute-Vallée de l'Aude
- Intercommunality: Pyrénées Audoises

Government
  - Mayor (2020–2026): Didier Paris
- Area^{1}: 5.29 km^{2} (2.04 sq mi)
- Elevation: 912 m (2,992 ft)
- Highest elevation: 1,600 m (5,200 ft)
- Lowest elevation: 660 m (2,170 ft)
- Population (2023): 6
  - Density: 1.1/km^{2} (2.9/sq mi)
- Time zone: UTC+01:00 (CET)
  - Summer (DST): UTC+02:00 (CEST)
- INSEE/Postal code: 11147 /11140
- ^{1} French Land Register data, which excludes lakes, ponds, glaciers > 1 km^{2} (0.386 sq mi or 247 acres) and river estuaries.

Fontanès-de-Sault (French pronunciation: [fɔ̃tanɛs də so]; Occitan: Fontanes) is a commune in the Aude department in southern France.

== Population ==
Historical population
Year	Pop.	±% p.a.
1968	7	—
1975	8	+1.93%
1982	20	+13.99%
1990	6	−13.97%
1999	4	−4.41%
2007	11	+13.48%
2012	4	−18.32%
2017	5	+4.56%
2023	6	+3.09%
Source: INSEE

== See also ==
- Communes of the Aude department
