= Routier, Aude =

Commune in Occitanie, France

Routier
- Commune
- Coat of arms
- Location of Routier
- Location within France Location within Occitanie
- Coordinates: 43°06′31″N 2°07′39″E
- Country: France
- Region: Occitania
- Department: Aude
- Arrondissement: Limoux
- Canton: La Piège au Razès

Government
  - Mayor (2020–2026): Michèle Ancelle
- Area^{1}: 11.27 km^{2} (4.35 sq mi)
- Elevation: 195 m (640 ft)
- Highest elevation: 304 m (997 ft)
- Lowest elevation: 190 m (620 ft)
- Population (2023): 231
  - Density: 20.5/km^{2} (53.1/sq mi)
- Time zone: UTC+01:00 (CET)
  - Summer (DST): UTC+02:00 (CEST)
- INSEE/Postal code: 11328 /11240
- ^{1} French Land Register data, which excludes lakes, ponds, glaciers > 1 km^{2} (0.386 sq mi or 247 acres) and river estuaries.

Routier (French pronunciation: [ʁutje]; Occitan: Rotièr) is a commune in the Aude department in southern France.

== Population ==
Historical population
Year	Pop.	±% p.a.
1968	279	—
1975	262	−0.89%
1982	250	−0.67%
1990	237	−0.67%
1999	225	−0.58%
2007	259	+1.77%
2012	253	−0.47%
2017	248	−0.40%
2023	231	−1.18%
Source: INSEE

== Notable people ==
- Lazare Escarguel (1816-1893), politician and newspaper editor born and died in Routier.

== See also ==
- Communes of the Aude department
