= Rodome =

Commune in Occitanie, France

- Commune
- Coat of arms
- Location of Rodome
- Location within France Location within Occitanie
- Coordinates: 42°47′59″N 2°04′15″E
- Country: France
- Region: Occitania
- Department: Aude
- Arrondissement: Limoux
- Canton: La Haute-Vallée de l'Aude

Government
  - Mayor (2020–2026): Hervé Chaput
- Area^{1}: 11.77 km^{2} (4.54 sq mi)
- Elevation: 950 m (3,120 ft)
- Highest elevation: 1,631 m (5,351 ft)
- Lowest elevation: 718 m (2,356 ft)
- Population (2023): 96
  - Density: 8.2/km^{2} (21/sq mi)
- Time zone: UTC+01:00 (CET)
  - Summer (DST): UTC+02:00 (CEST)
- INSEE/Postal code: 11317 /11140
- ^{1} French Land Register data, which excludes lakes, ponds, glaciers > 1 km^{2} (0.386 sq mi or 247 acres) and river estuaries.

Rodome (French pronunciation: [ʁɔdɔm]; Occitan: Redoma) is a commune in the Aude department in southern France.

== Population ==
Historical population
| Year | Pop. | ±% p.a. |
|---|---|---|
| 1968 | 158 | — |
| 1975 | 135 | −2.22% |
| 1982 | 144 | +0.93% |
| 1990 | 124 | −1.85% |
| 1999 | 95 | −2.92% |
| 2007 | 120 | +2.96% |
| 2012 | 145 | +3.86% |
| 2017 | 124 | −3.08% |
| 2023 | 96 | −4.18% |
Source: INSEE

== See also ==
- Communes of the Aude department
