= Bellegarde-du-Razès =

Commune in Occitanie, France

- Commune
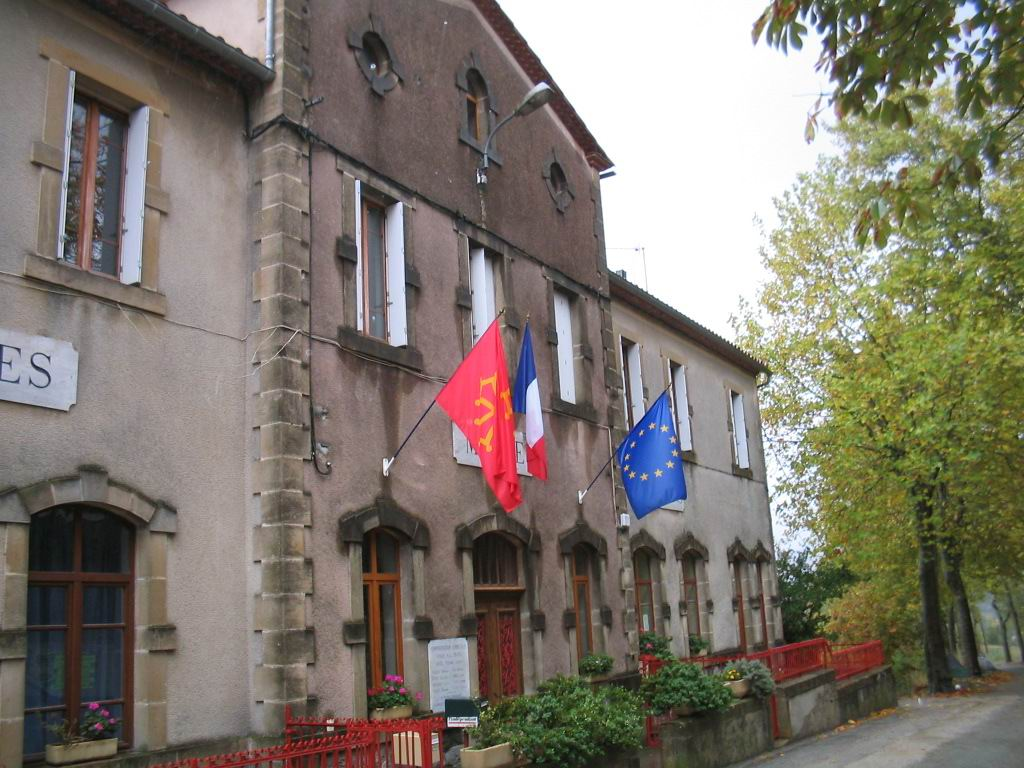
- The town hall in Bellegarde-du-Razès

- Coat of arms
- Location of Bellegarde-du-Razès
- Location within France Location within Occitanie
- Coordinates: 43°06′34″N 2°02′38″E
- Country: France
- Region: Occitania
- Department: Aude
- Arrondissement: Limoux
- Canton: La Piège au Razès

Government
  - Mayor (2020–2026): Roland Chaynes
- Area^{1}: 6.31 km^{2} (2.44 sq mi)
- Elevation: 330 m (1,080 ft)
- Highest elevation: 410 m (1,350 ft)
- Lowest elevation: 244 m (801 ft)
- Population (2023): 251
  - Density: 39.8/km^{2} (103/sq mi)
- Time zone: UTC+01:00 (CET)
  - Summer (DST): UTC+02:00 (CEST)
- INSEE/Postal code: 11032 /11240
- ^{1} French Land Register data, which excludes lakes, ponds, glaciers > 1 km^{2} (0.386 sq mi or 247 acres) and river estuaries.

Bellegarde-du-Razès (French pronunciation: [bɛlɡaʁd dy ʁazɛs]; Languedocien: Bèlagarda de Rasés) is a commune in the Aude department in southern France. The village reached its historical population peak in 1836, with a population of 499. The local residents are known in French as Bellegardiens.

== See also ==
- Communes of the Aude department
