= Montgeard Church =

16th century French church

Coordinates: 43.3390°N 1.6349°E

Church of Our Lady of the Assumption
- Église Notre-Dame-de-l'Assomption
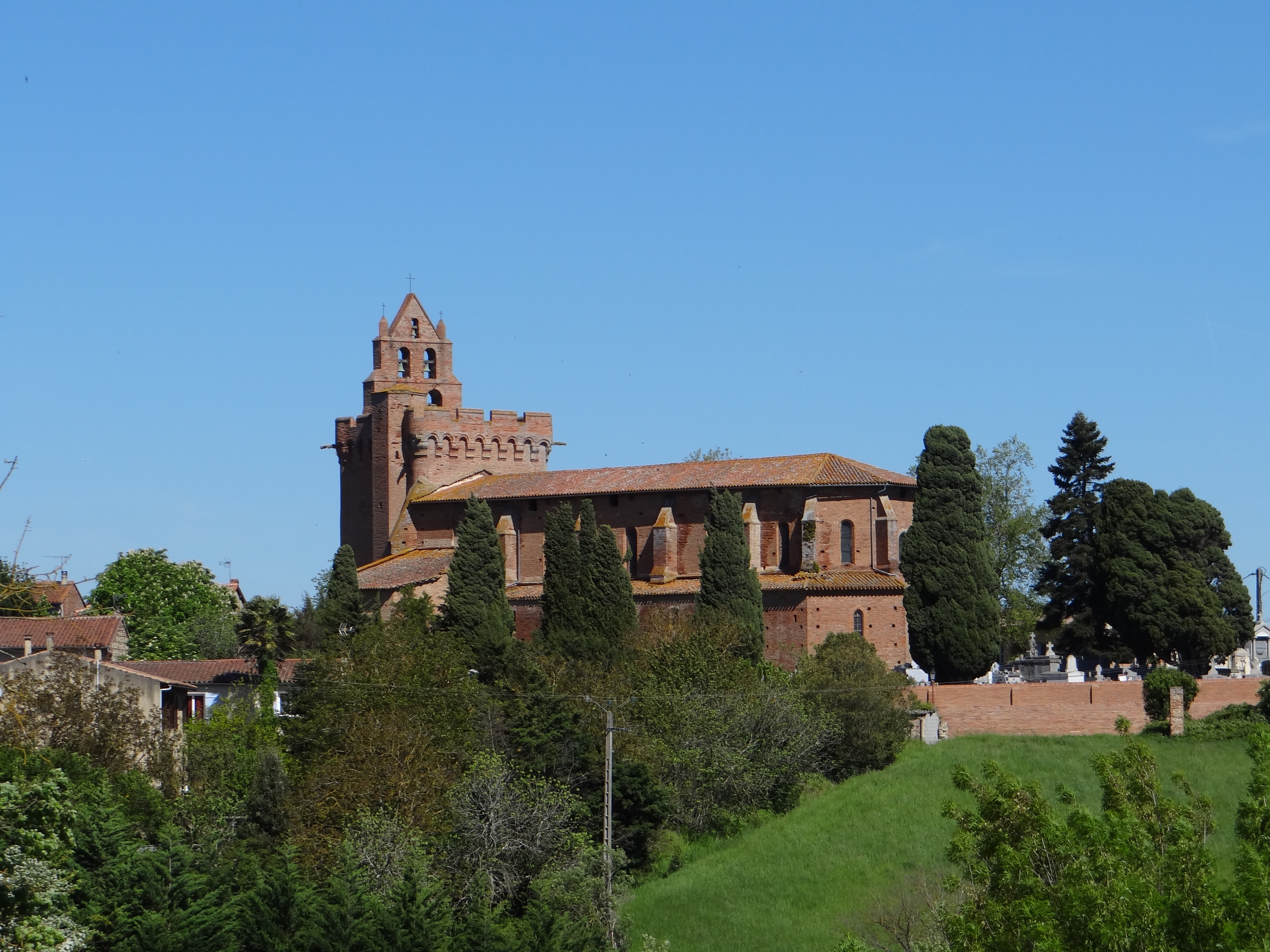
- Montgeard Church, seen from the South
- Church of Our Lady of the Assumption
- Location: Montgeard, Haute-Garonne, Occitanie
- Country: France
- Denomination: Roman Catholic

History
- Status: Parish church
- Dedication: Assumption of Mary

Architecture
- Functional status: Active
- Architectural type: Church
- Style: Southern French Gothic
- Years built: 1522–1561

Administration
- Diocese: Archdiocese of Toulouse

Monument historique
- Official name: Église Notre-Dame-de-l'Assomption
- Type: Église
- Designated: 1980
- Reference no.: PA00094393

The Church of Our Lady of the Assumption (French: Église Notre-Dame-de-l'Assomption) of Montgeard is a Roman Catholic parish church in the village of Montgeard, in the Haute-Garonne department of Occitanie, southwestern France. Built mainly between 1522 and 1561, during the height of the prosperous woad trade that made the Lauragais region famous as a mythical pays de cocagne, it is regarded by scholars as a well-preserved example of an église du pastel ("woad church"), a church financed by fortunes derived from the cultivation and trade of woad.

Designed in the Southern French Gothic style, the church was largely funded by merchant families enriched through the international trade in woad dye, particularly the Durand family. Its construction reflects the economic prosperity that transformed the Lauragais during the Renaissance and enabled the erection of unusually ambitious religious buildings in rural communities.

Although austere in appearance, the church contains works of Late Gothic, Renaissance and Baroque art, including a Tuscan marble stoup imported from Italy, English alabaster reliefs, Renaissance sculpture and an extensive nineteenth-century painted decoration inspired by Albi Cathedral.

The church is classified as a Monument Historique by the French Ministry of Culture since 1980. According to the art historian Pascal Julien, the ambitious design of its bell tower, the quality of its sculpture and the presence of imported works of art make it a monument unique among the churches erected in Languedoc during the same period.

== History ==
=== Origins and the first church ===
Montgeard is a royal bastide founded on 21 June 1317 by King Philip V of France. A bastide is a planned medieval town, typically laid out on a grid pattern around a central market square, created to encourage settlement and economic development in southwestern France.

Documentary evidence confirms the presence of a religious building on the site long before the construction of the present church.

A document dated 1218 mentions a sanctuary known as Notre-Dame-des-Cabanes ("Our Lady of the Huts") in the royal forest of Nailloux. A century later, in 1318, another document stated that Avignon Pope John XXII attached the priory of Montgeard to Saint Stephen's Cathedral in Toulouse. Further records from the early sixteenth century refer to works in a building already existing on the site, indicating that an earlier sanctuary stood there before the rebuilding campaign of the years 1520.

=== Economic prosperity and the "age of woad" ===
The fifteenth and sixteenth centuries were a period of economic prosperity for the Lauragais. The cultivation and export of woad (Isatis tinctoria), the plant from which a valuable blue dye was obtained, generated considerable wealth for local merchants. Montgeard became one of the wealthiest rural communities in the region.

Among the leading beneficiaries of the woad trade were the Durands, who financed much of the church and acquired the lordship of Montgeard in 1554.

=== Construction of the church ===
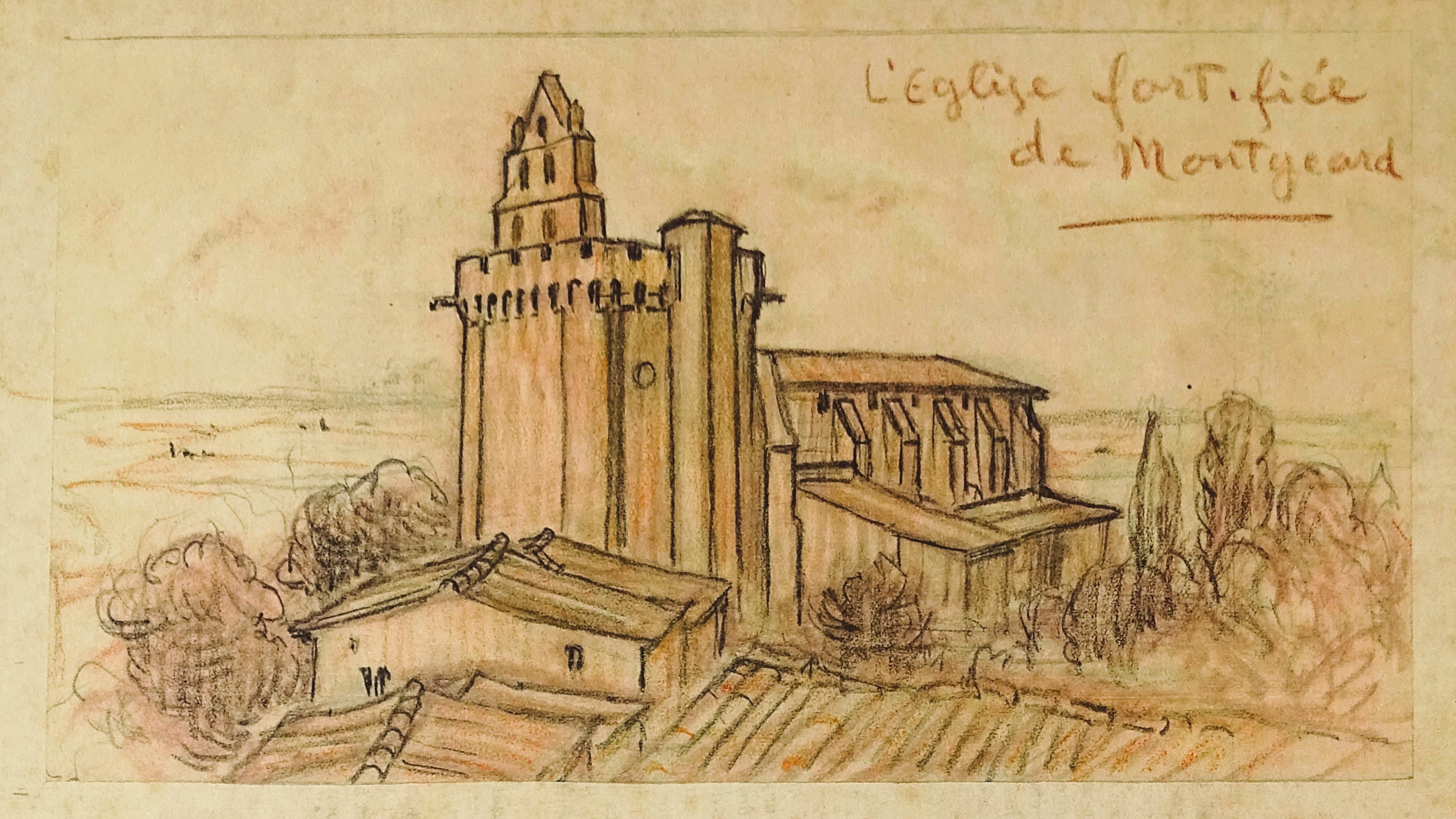
The church as depicted by the local painter Paul Sibra in 1926

The construction of the present church took place mainly between 1522 and 1561. A first building campaign, directed by the Toulouse master mason Pierre Gabriac between 1522 and 1524, saw the construction of the choir and part of the nave. After Gabriac's death, the works were continued by Jean d'Escalquens, known as Pothony ("Little kiss"), who completed most of the nave by 1528.

Although the church remained unfinished, it was consecrated in 1540. A third phase of construction, carried out between 1546 and 1561, added the bell tower-porch and the western bay connecting it to the nave. The original project was never fully completed, however, as the bell tower, intended to be taller, remained unfinished.

Owing to its size and architectural ambition, Montgeard Church ranks among the largest parish churches built in the Lauragais during the age of the woad trade.

=== Later modifications ===
The church underwent several alterations and restoration campaigns after its completion.

In the early eighteenth century, the original choir was completely remodelled in the French Baroque style, resulting in a sanctuary that contrasted markedly with the predominantly Southern Gothic character of the building.

Further changes occurred during the second half of the nineteenth century, when the interior was adorned with an extensive painted decoration inspired by Saint Cecilia Cathedral in Albi following the Neo-Renaissance fashion of the time.

The juxtaposition of Gothic structure, Renaissance ornament, Baroque furnishings and nineteenth-century decoration provides an unusually complete record of the church's artistic evolution.

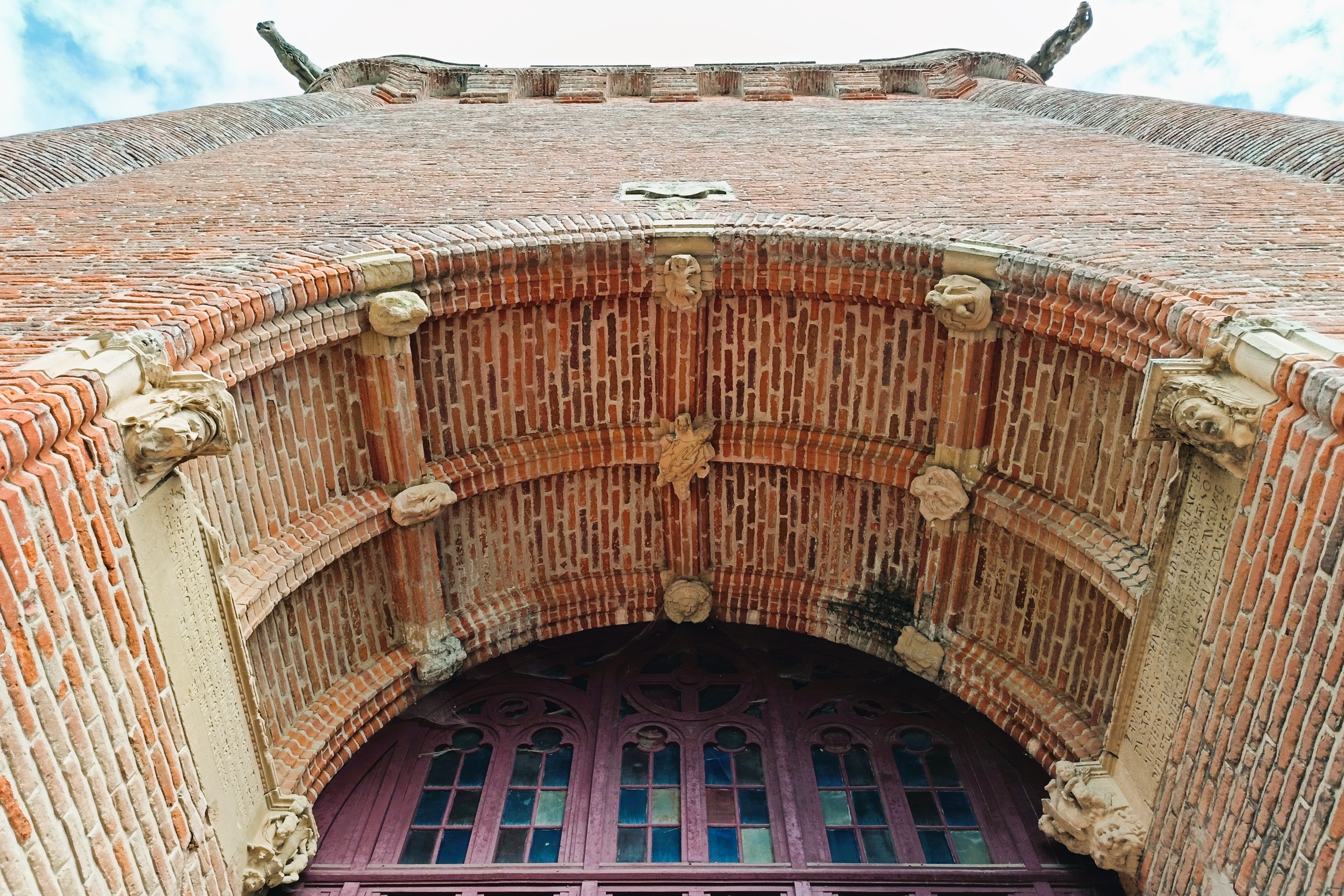
Renaissance coffered vault in the porch beneath the bell tower

== Architecture ==
=== Exterior ===
The church is a characteristic example of Southern French Gothic architecture. Constructed primarily of brick, it presents a remarkably austere appearance, with massive walls, narrow windows, powerful buttresses and defensive features that evoke a fortified structure.

The contrast between the severe exterior and the lavish interior recalls other major monuments of the Toulouse area.

==== Bell tower ====
The massive bell tower-porch, although never completed according to its original design, reflects the ambition of the church's wealthy patrons. Its porch preserves an important ensemble of Renaissance sculpture, including carved keystones and corbels decorated with putti, mythological figures, lion heads and other classical motifs. Among the most unusual features is a gargoyle representing a hybrid female creature, identified by various scholars as either a fauness or a harpy.

According to Pascal Julien, these decorations illustrate the rapid spread of Renaissance ornament into rural Lauragais during the sixteenth century.

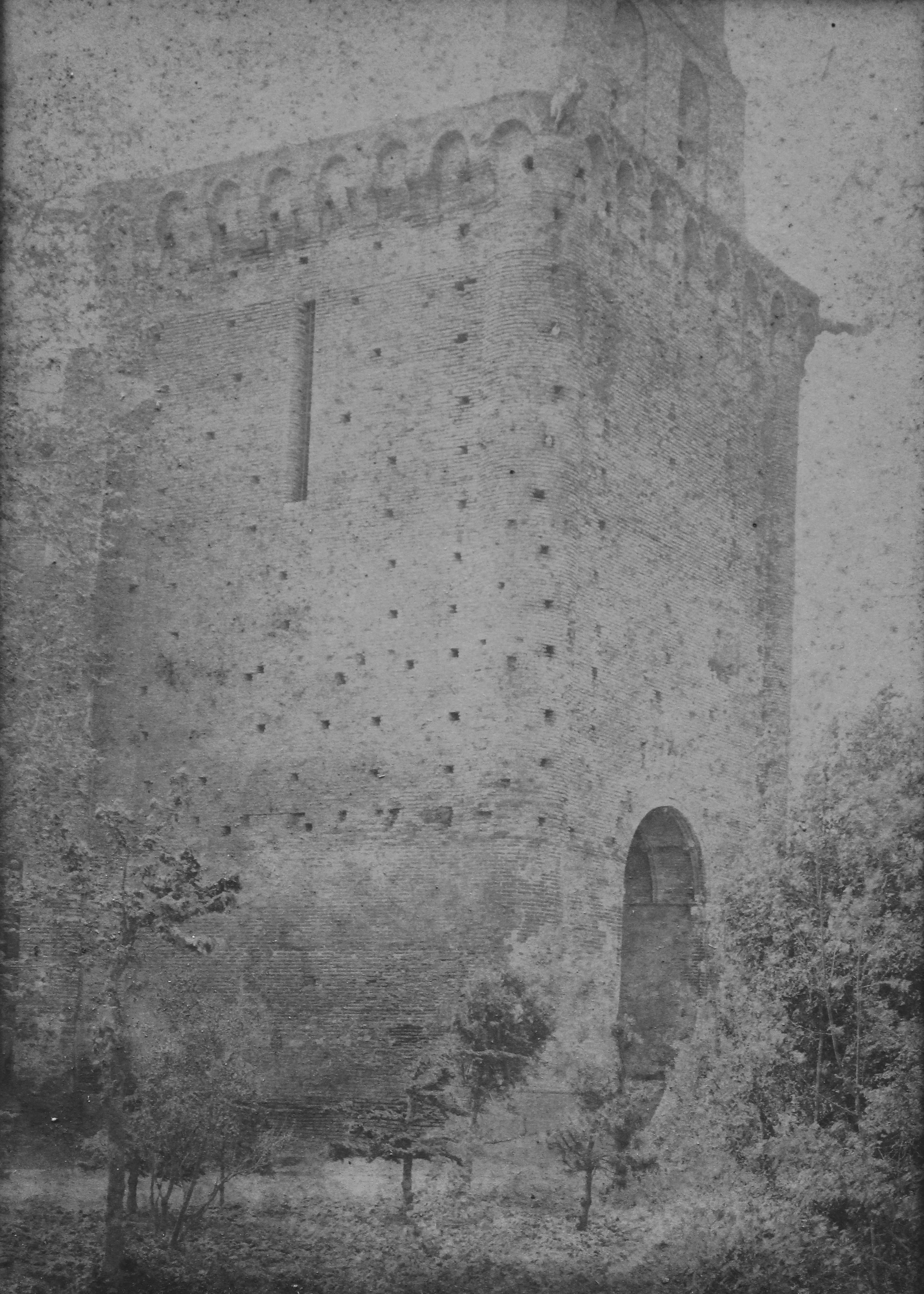
The bell tower before restoration, early 20th Century

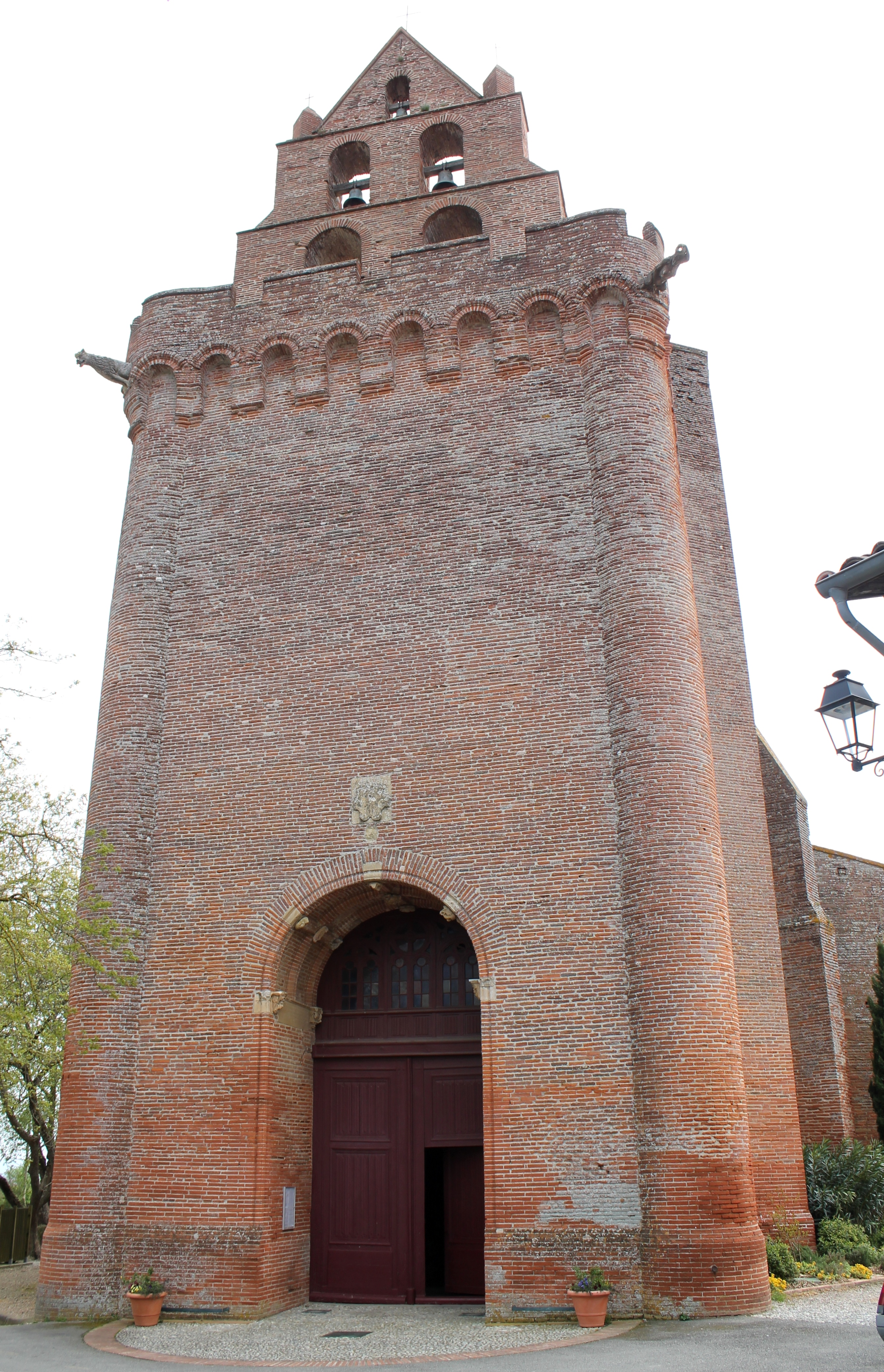
The bell tower seen from the west

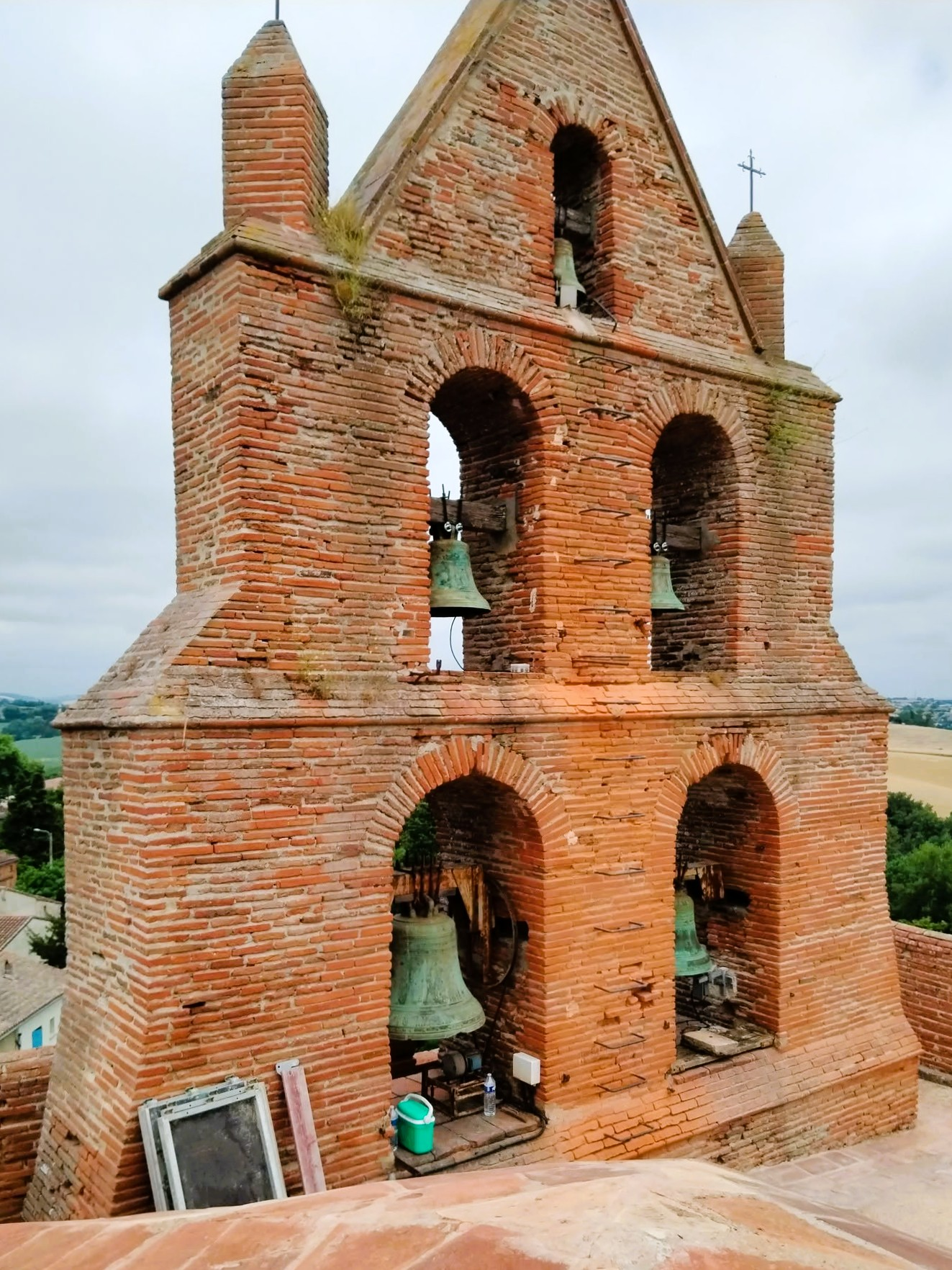
Pyramidal bell-gable on top of the bell tower

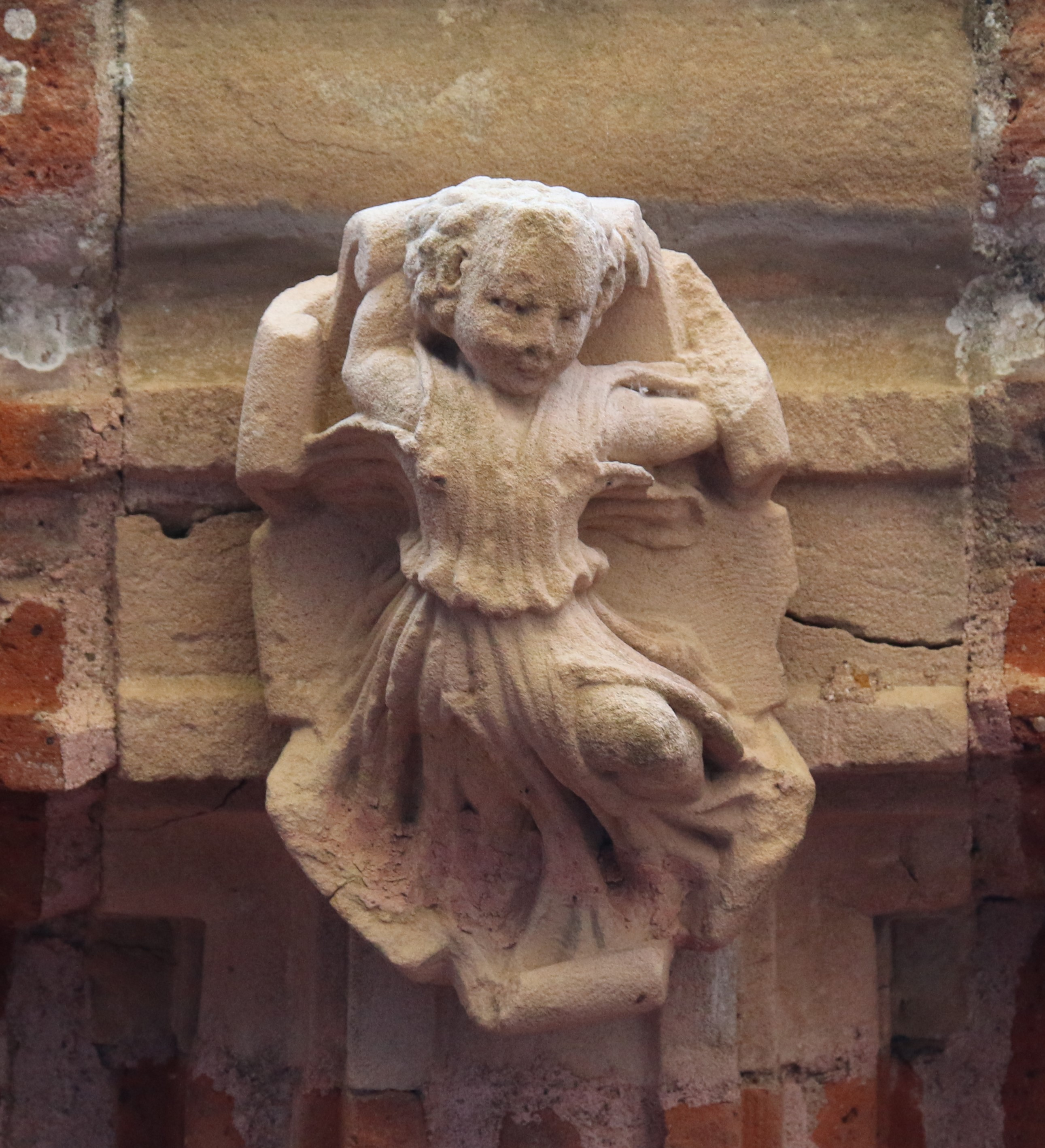
Keystone depicting a dancing fauness, mid-16th century

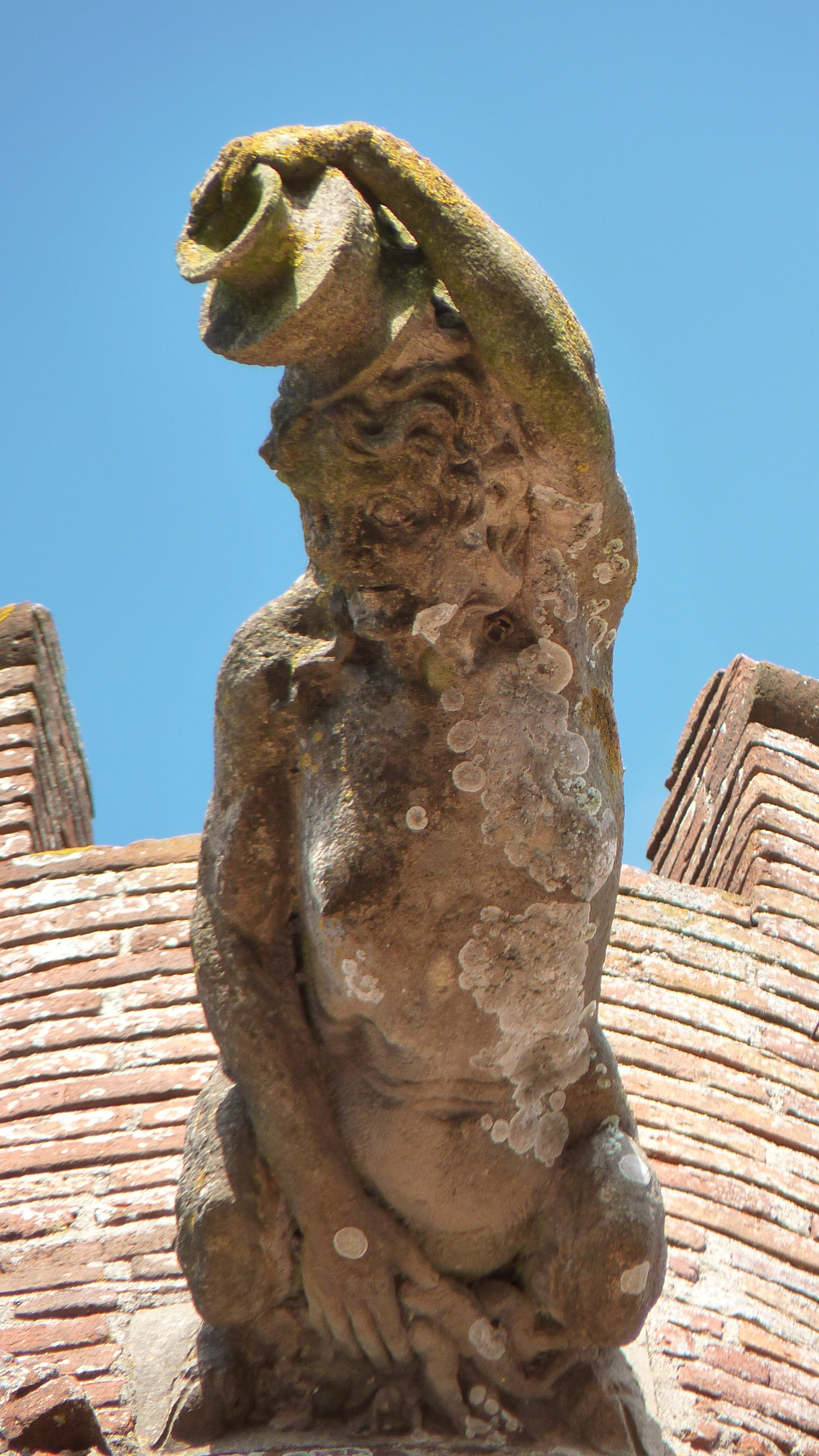
Gargoyle of a fauness giving birth, mid-16th Century

=== Interior ===
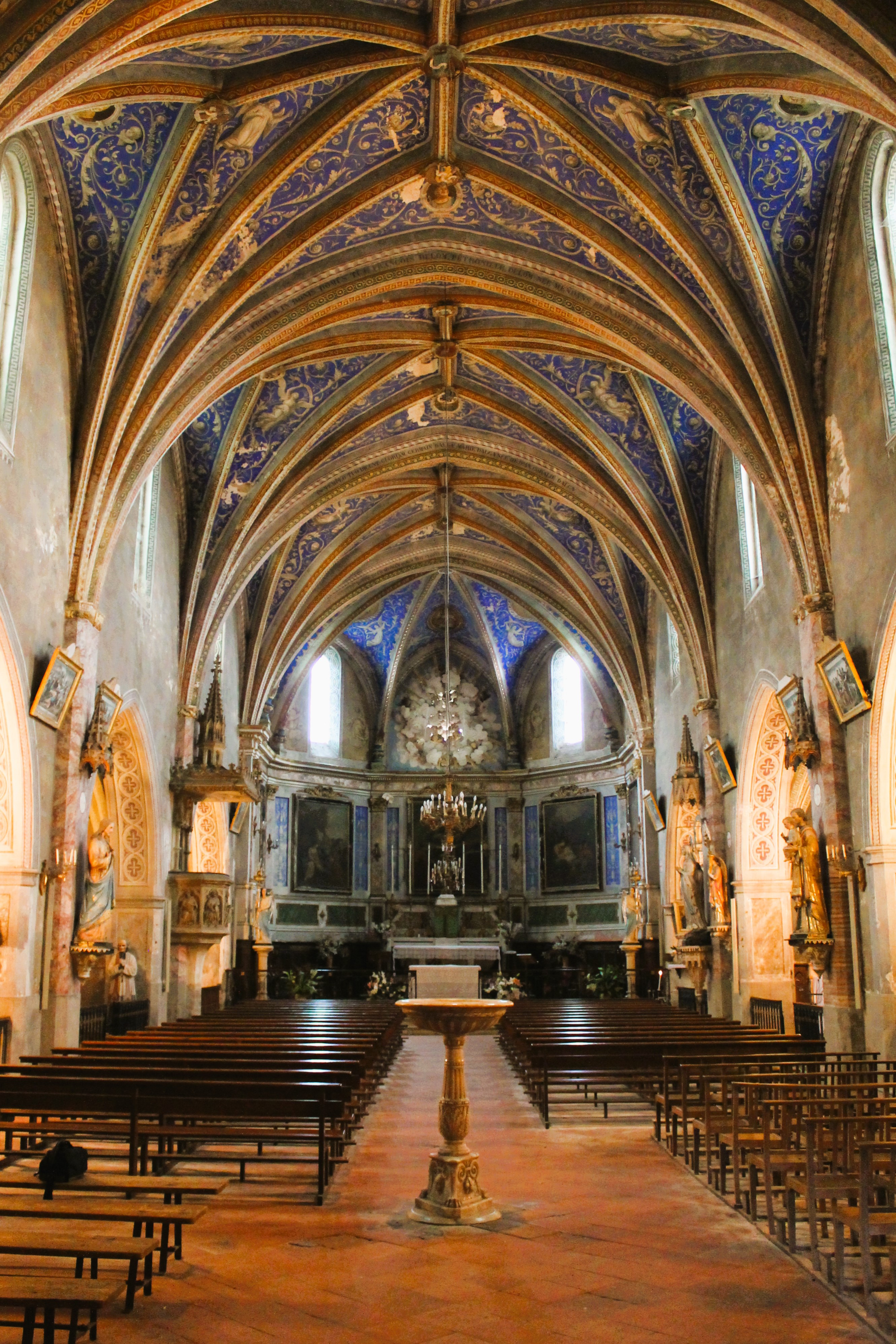
The nave with its Neo-Renaissance vaults; the Italian stoup at the centre

==== Nave and Vault ====
The church consists of a single nave flanked by side chapels opening between the buttresses, a characteristic arrangement of Southern French Gothic architecture. The nave terminates in a polygonal apse and is covered by tierceron vaulting. Its most striking feature is the extensive Neo-Renaissance painted decoration executed in the 1860s by the Italian-born brothers François and Jean-Antoine Pedoya, inspired by the painted vaults of Albi Cathedral and responsible for the church's nickname, "Little Albi".

==== Furnishings and works of art ====
The church preserves a rich collection of religious art dating from the sixteenth to the nineteenth centuries, including sculptures, paintings, funerary monuments and liturgical furnishings. Several works are protected as historic monuments.

Among the church's most notable furnishings is a Renaissance marble stoup commissioned by Jacmes Caussidières in 1516 and imported from Pisa. Its rich decoration, combining classical and Christian imagery, reflects the prosperity and international outlook of the Lauragais woad merchants.

Several fragments of a dismantled alabaster altarpiece depicting scenes from the life of the Virgin Mary survive in the church, embedded in the walls of the nave and chapels. Probably produced in the English Midlands and imported to France after the English Reformation, they belong to the small group of surviving English alabaster sculptures preserved in southwestern France.

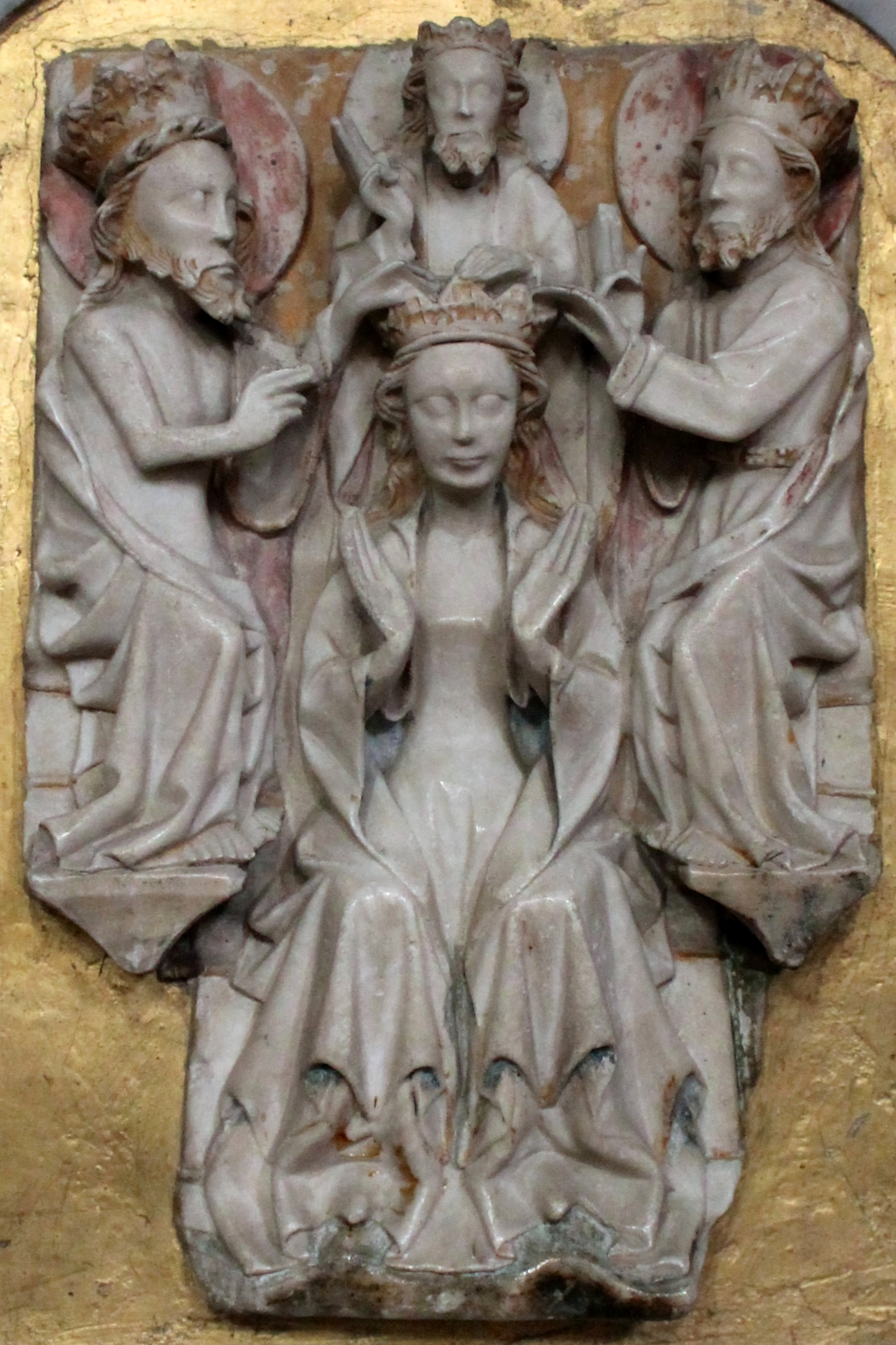
English alabaster carving, early 15th century

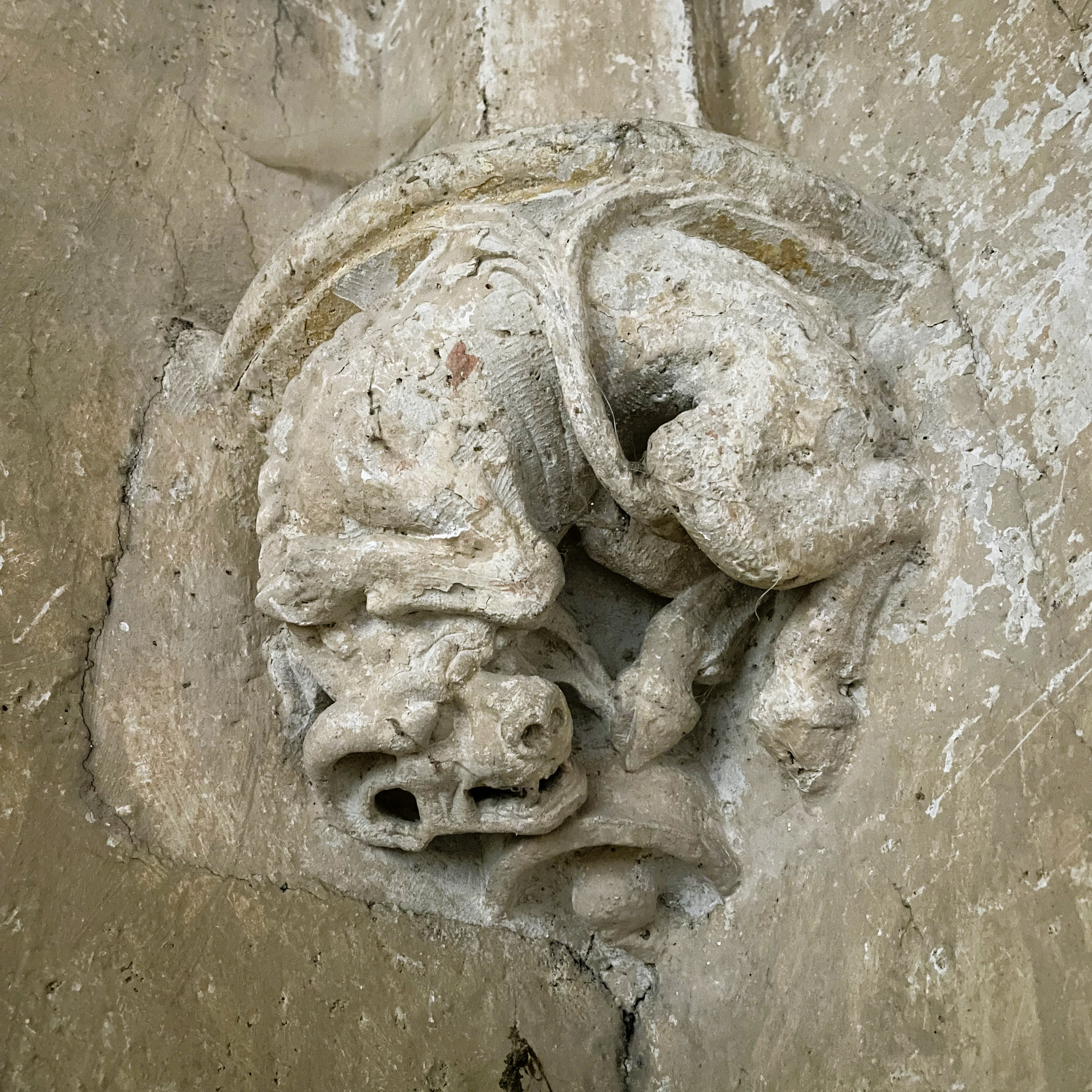
Corbel from the old sacristy, 1510s

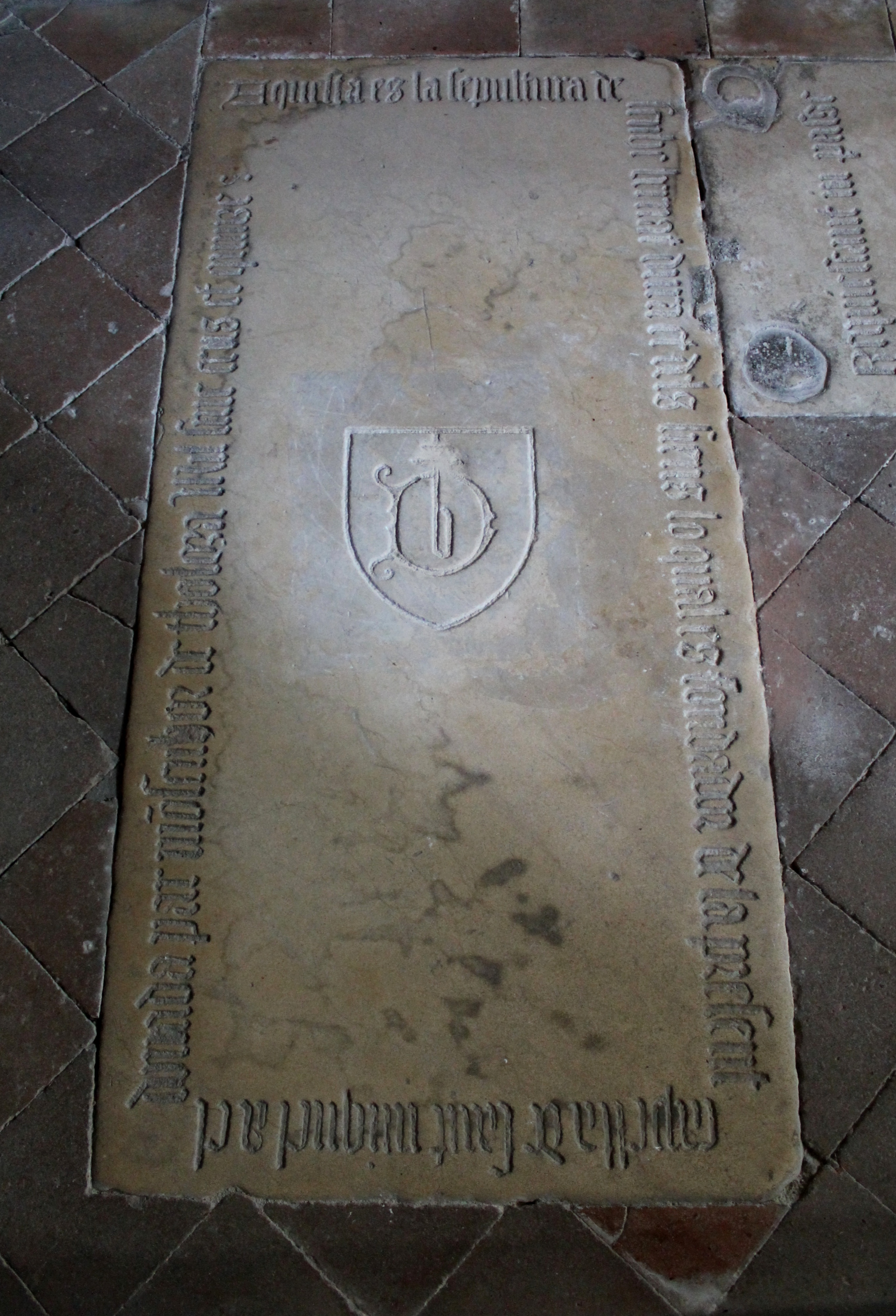
Tombstone of Bernat Durand and his descendants, 1515

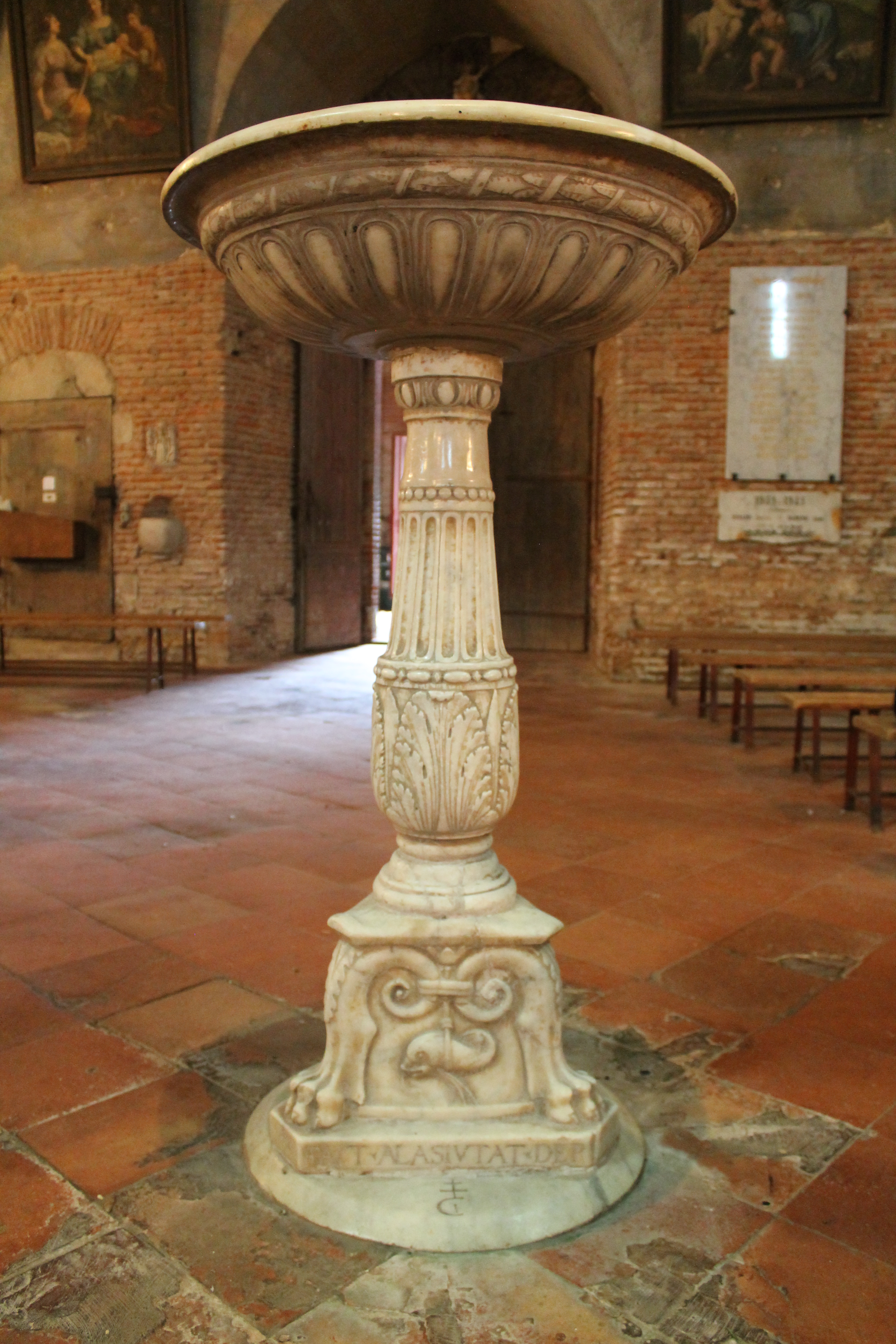
Tuscan marble stoup, 1516

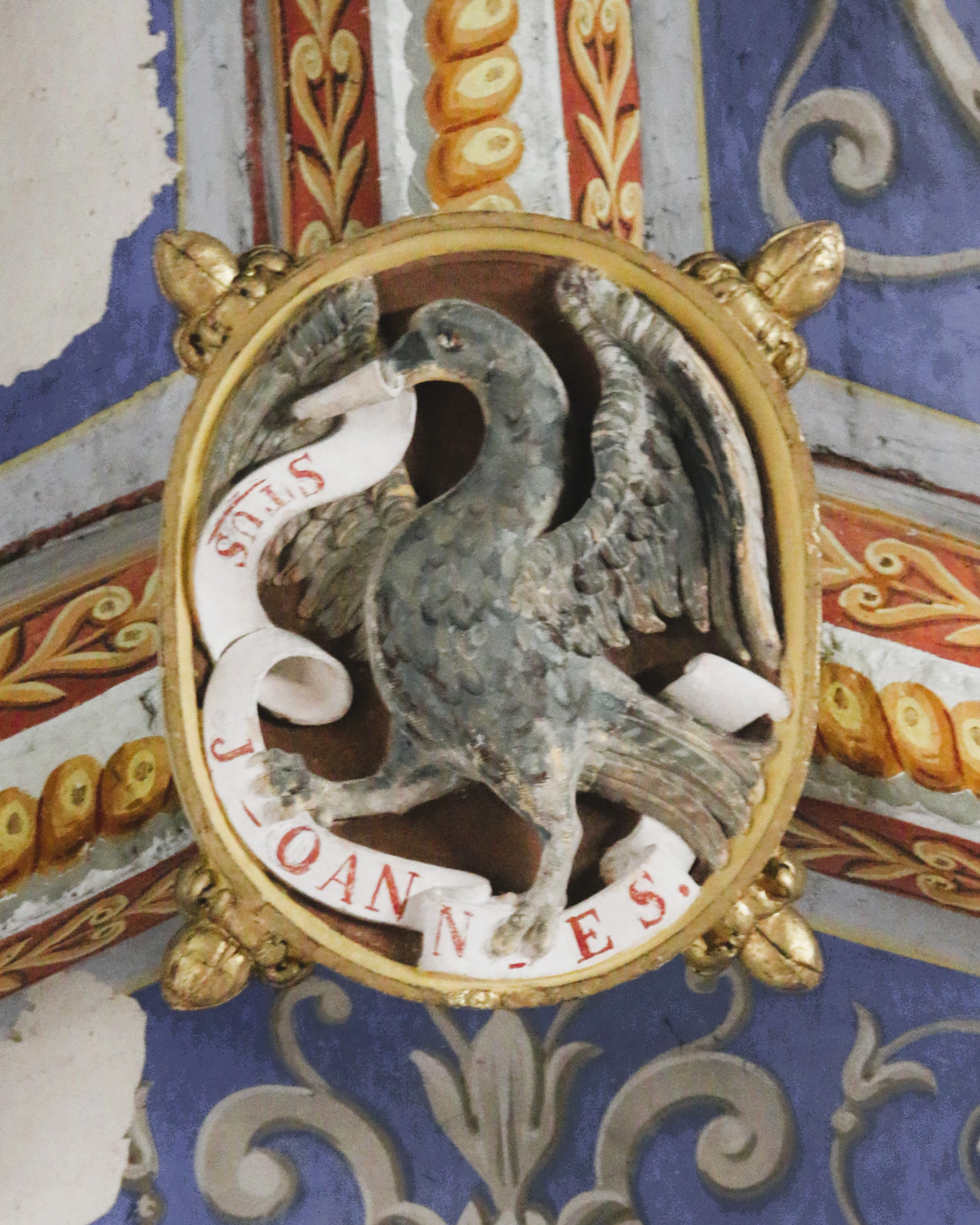
Keystone from the nave, 1520s

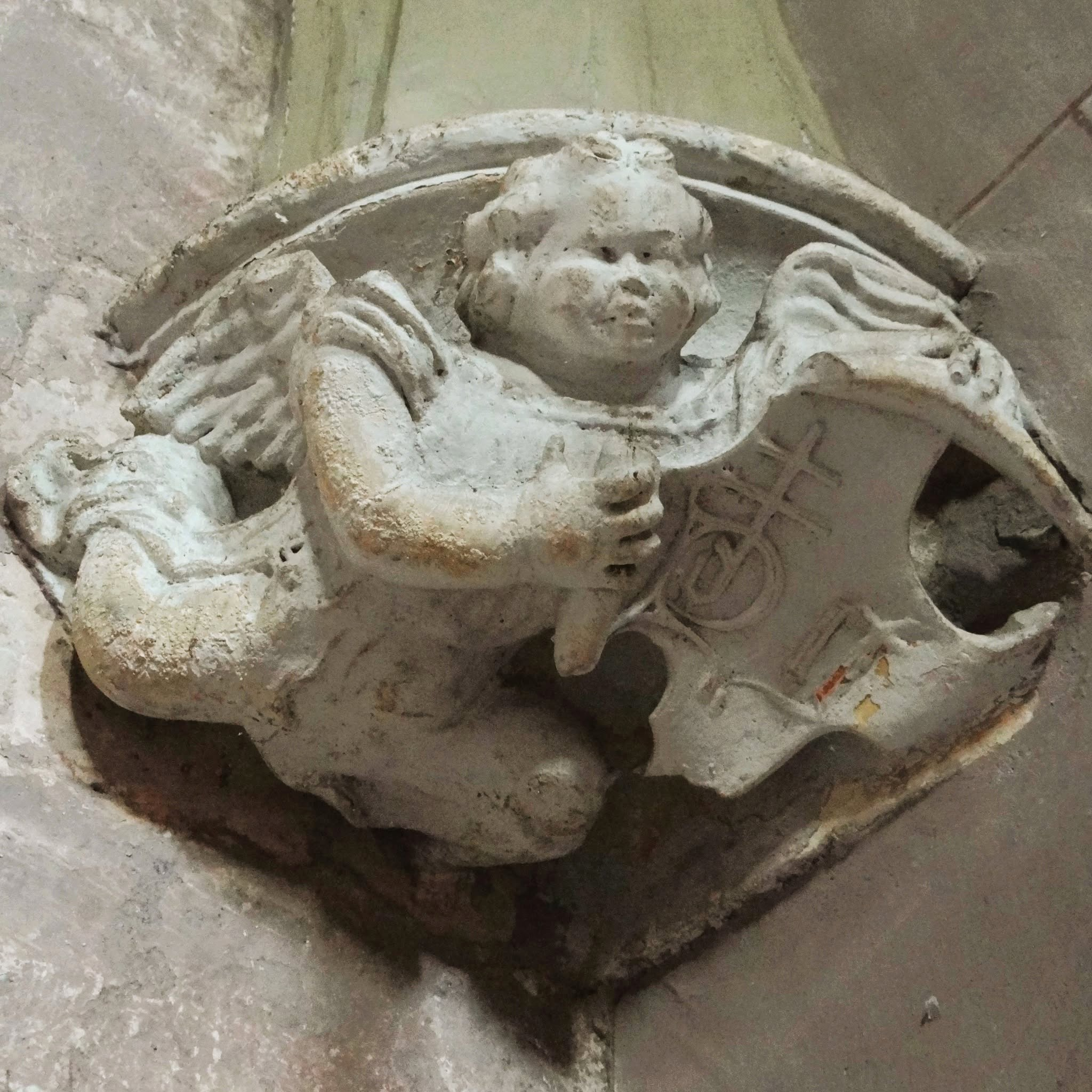
Corbel with an angel holding a strapwork cartouche with a family emblem, 1520s

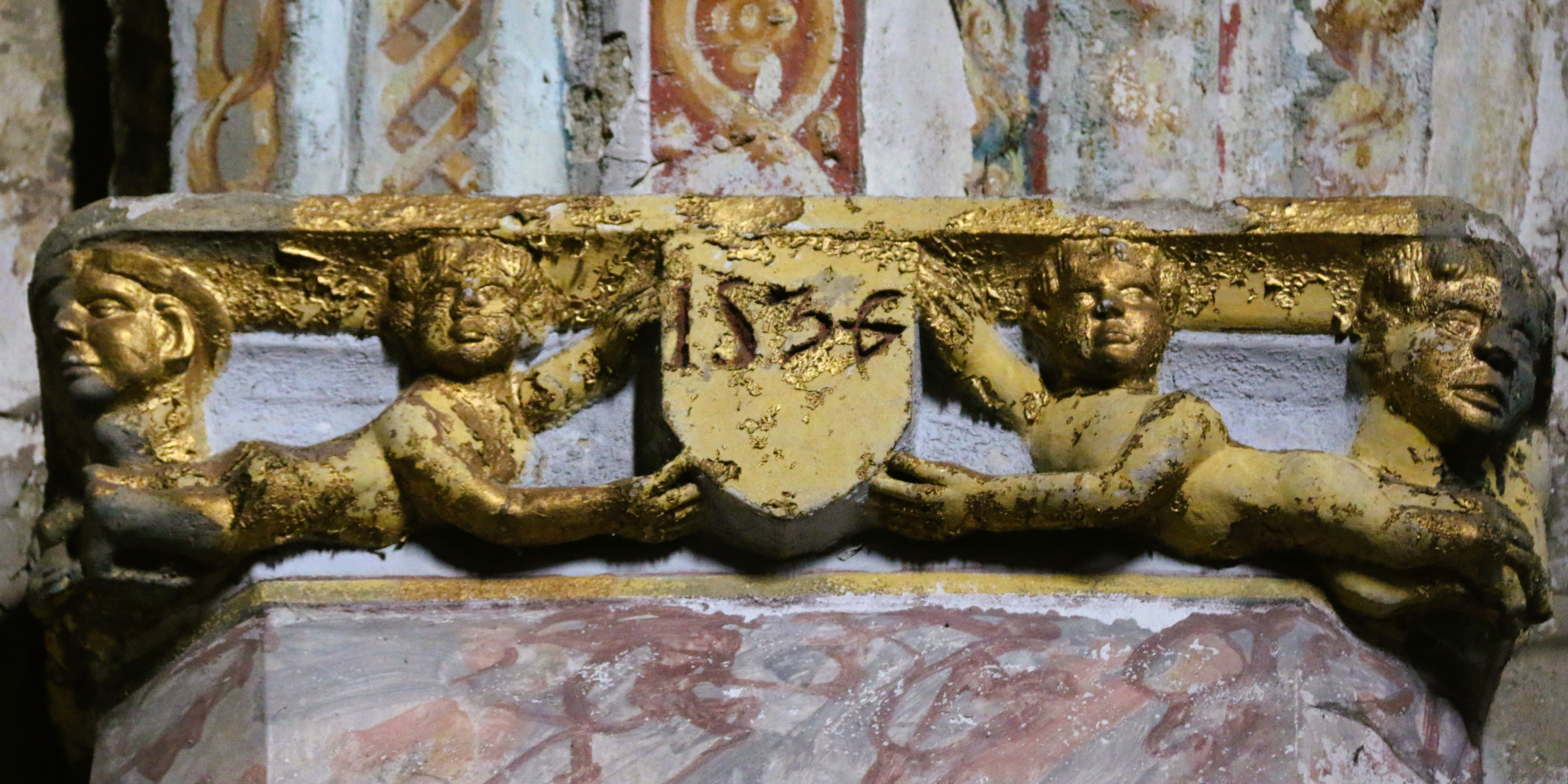
Capital from the nave

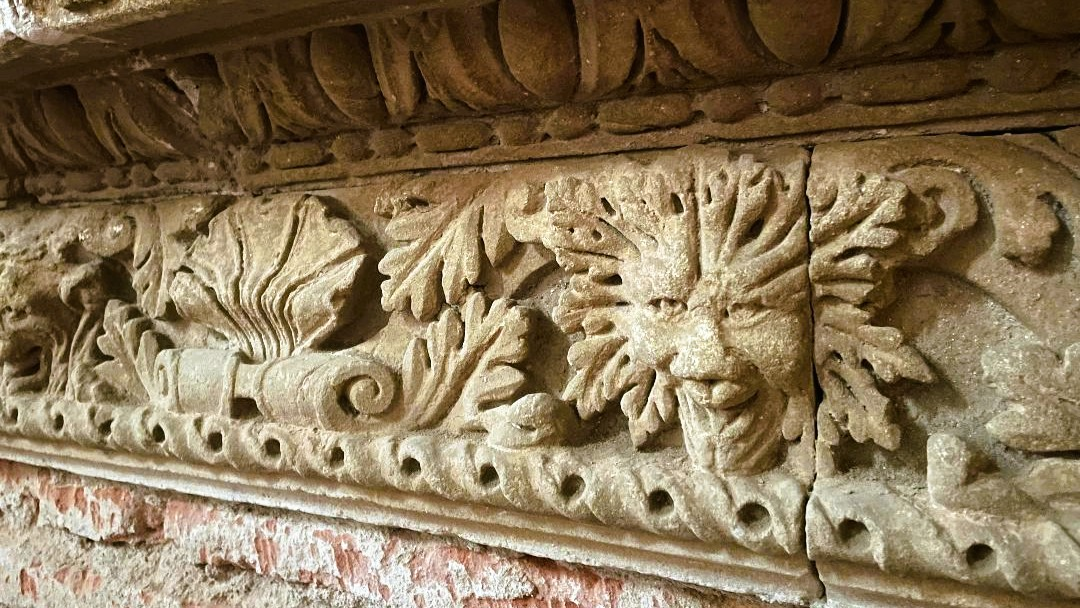
Detail of a mid-16^{th} Century frieze with a green man mask

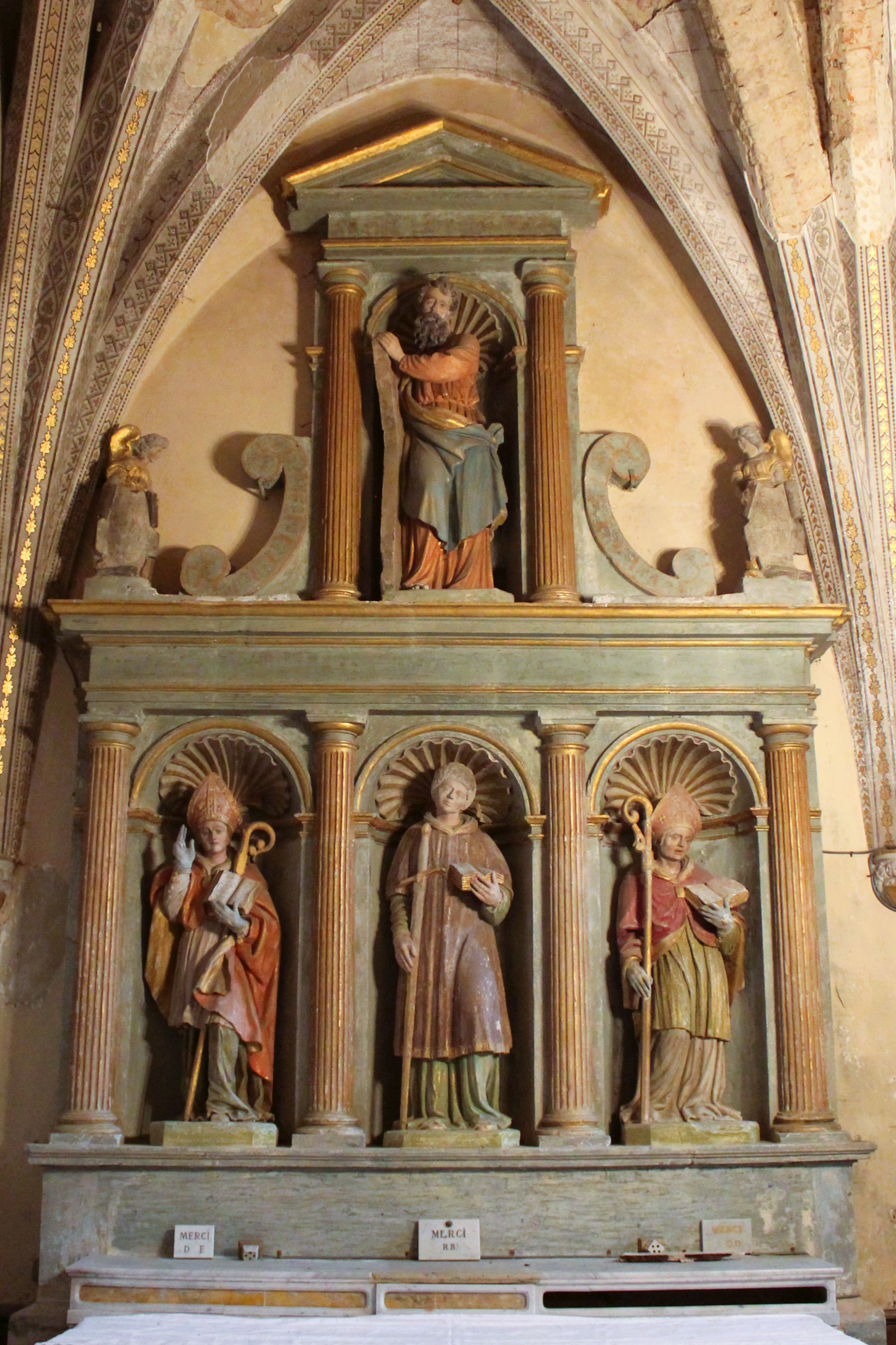
Altarpiece, late 16th Century

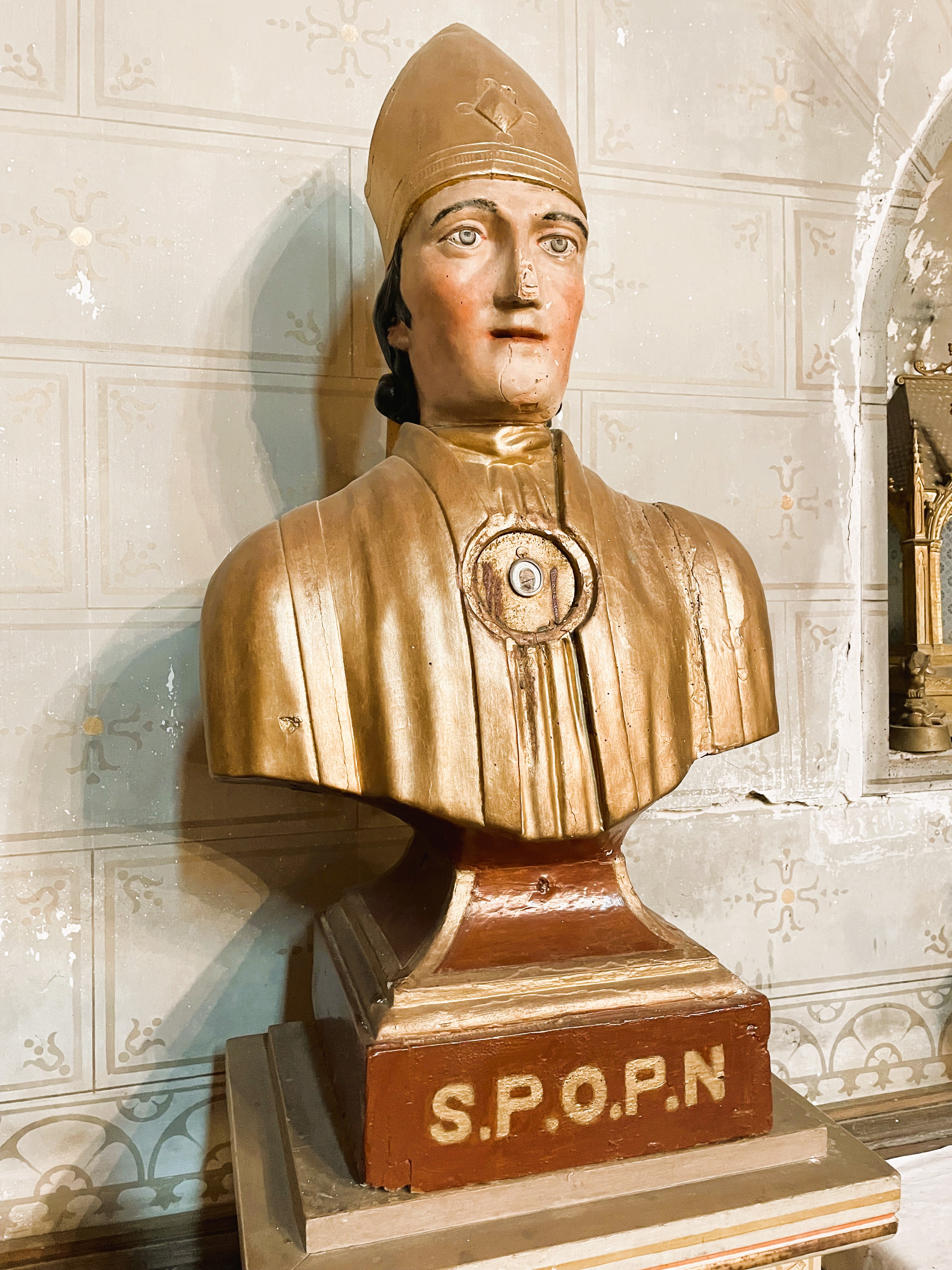
Reliquary bust, 19th Century

A late sixteenth-century stone altarpiece in one of the side chapels illustrates the spread of Renaissance and Mannerist artistic influences in the Toulouse region. It features several sculpted saints and ranks among the church's most significant works of monumental sculpture.

The church preserves a notable collection of sixteenth- and seventeenth-century funerary slabs associated with Montgeard's leading families. Several bear inscriptions in Occitan, illustrating the continued use of the language in local elite culture during the Renaissance. Among the most significant is the 1515 tombstone of Bernat Durand, founder of the Chapel of Saint Michael, which may predate the construction of the present church.

The church contains a significant collection of paintings dating mainly from the seventeenth and eighteenth centuries. The choir, remodelled in the Baroque period, is decorated with a Marian cycle centred on the Assumption and crowned by a monumental gloria (or "ray glory") above the high altar. The new sacristy preserves several religious paintings inspired by engraved models, illustrating the diffusion of Catholic imagery during the Early Modern period. Among the most notable works is Our Lady of the Rosary (1644), an original work donated by lord Jean Jacques Durand to commemorate the foundation of a Rosary confraternity in the church. Together, these paintings reflect the continued artistic enrichment of the building long after the great age of the woad trade.

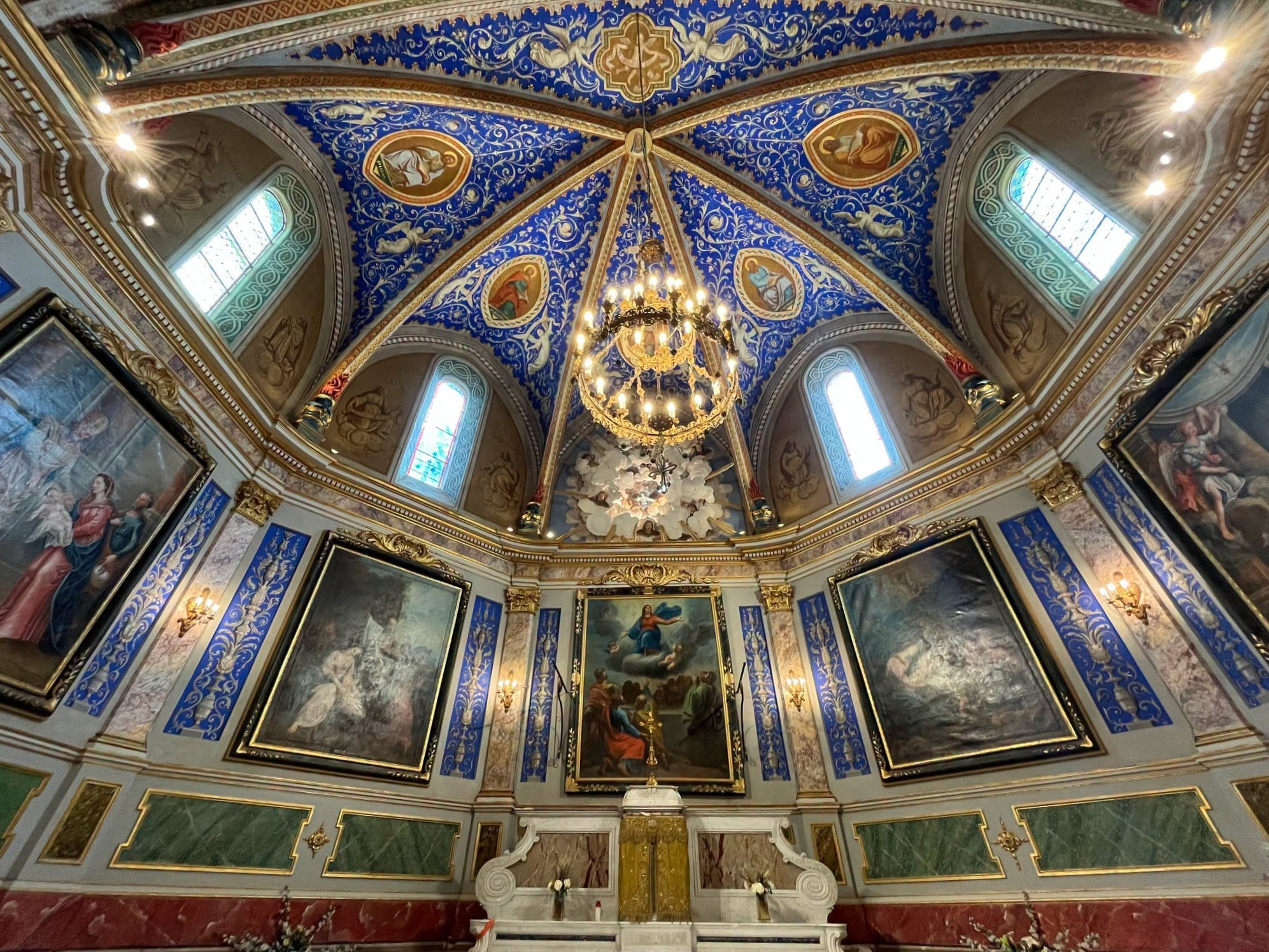
View of the restored choir

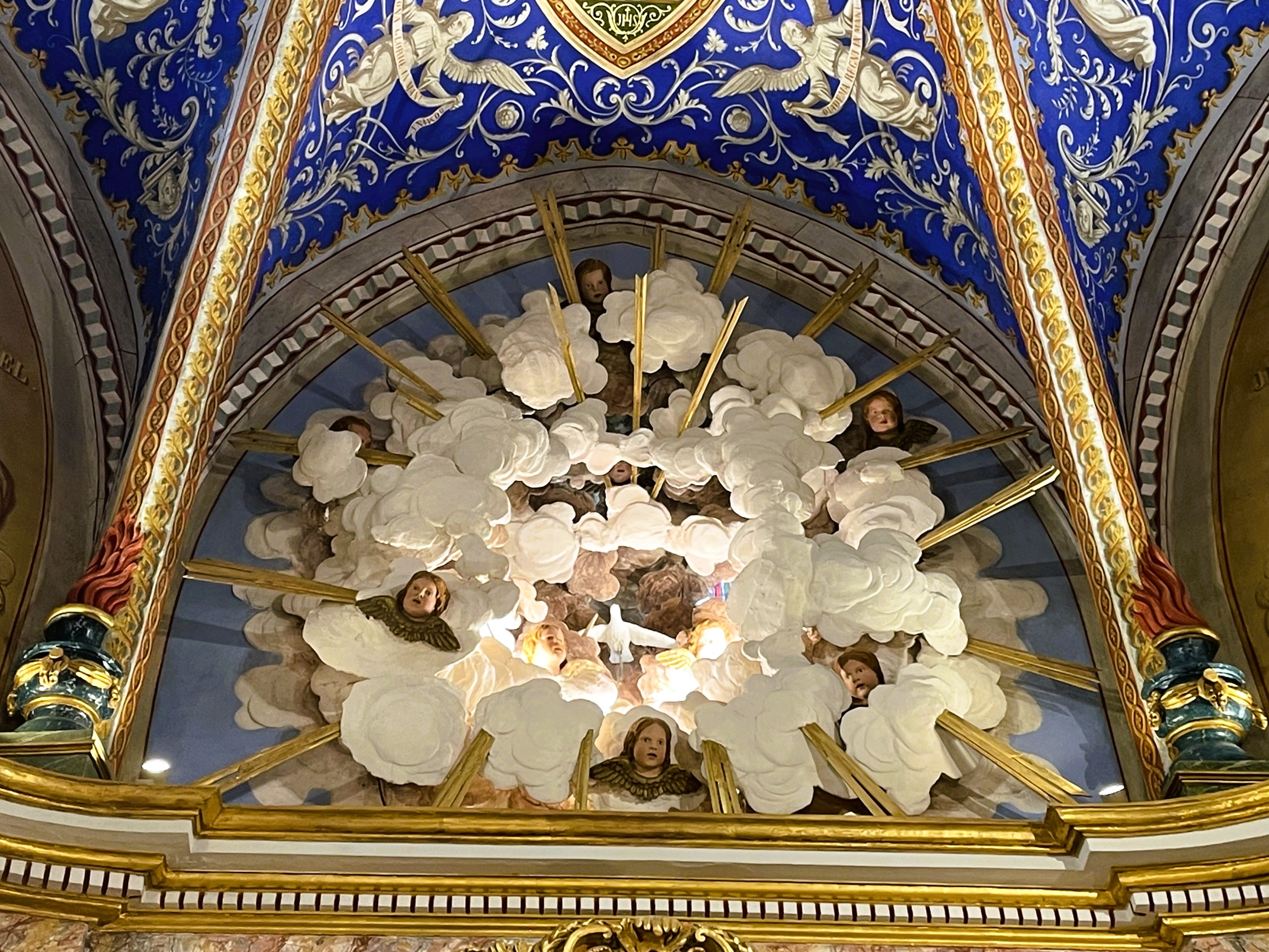
Detail of the ray glory above the choir

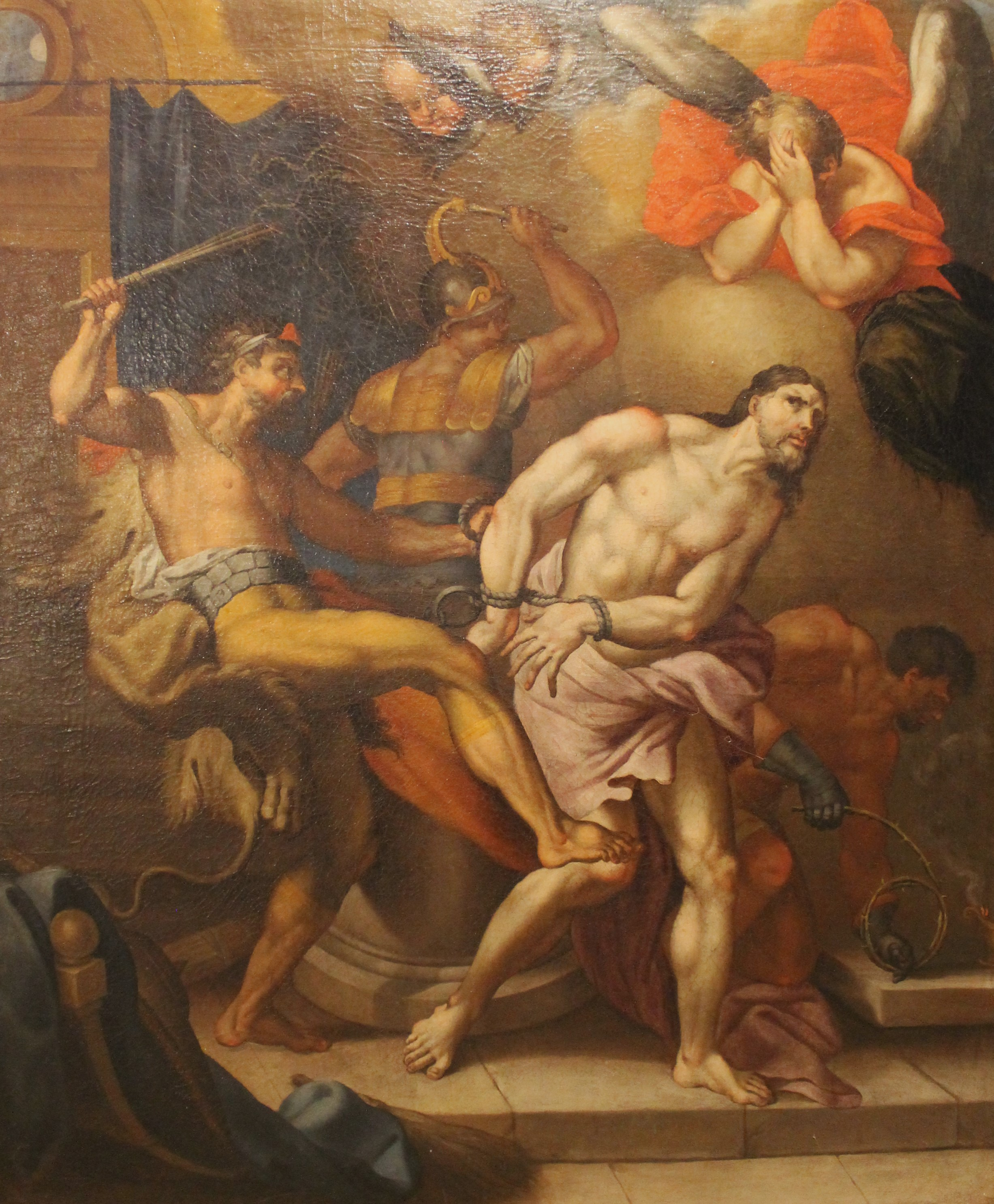
Flagellation of Christ, end of the 16th century

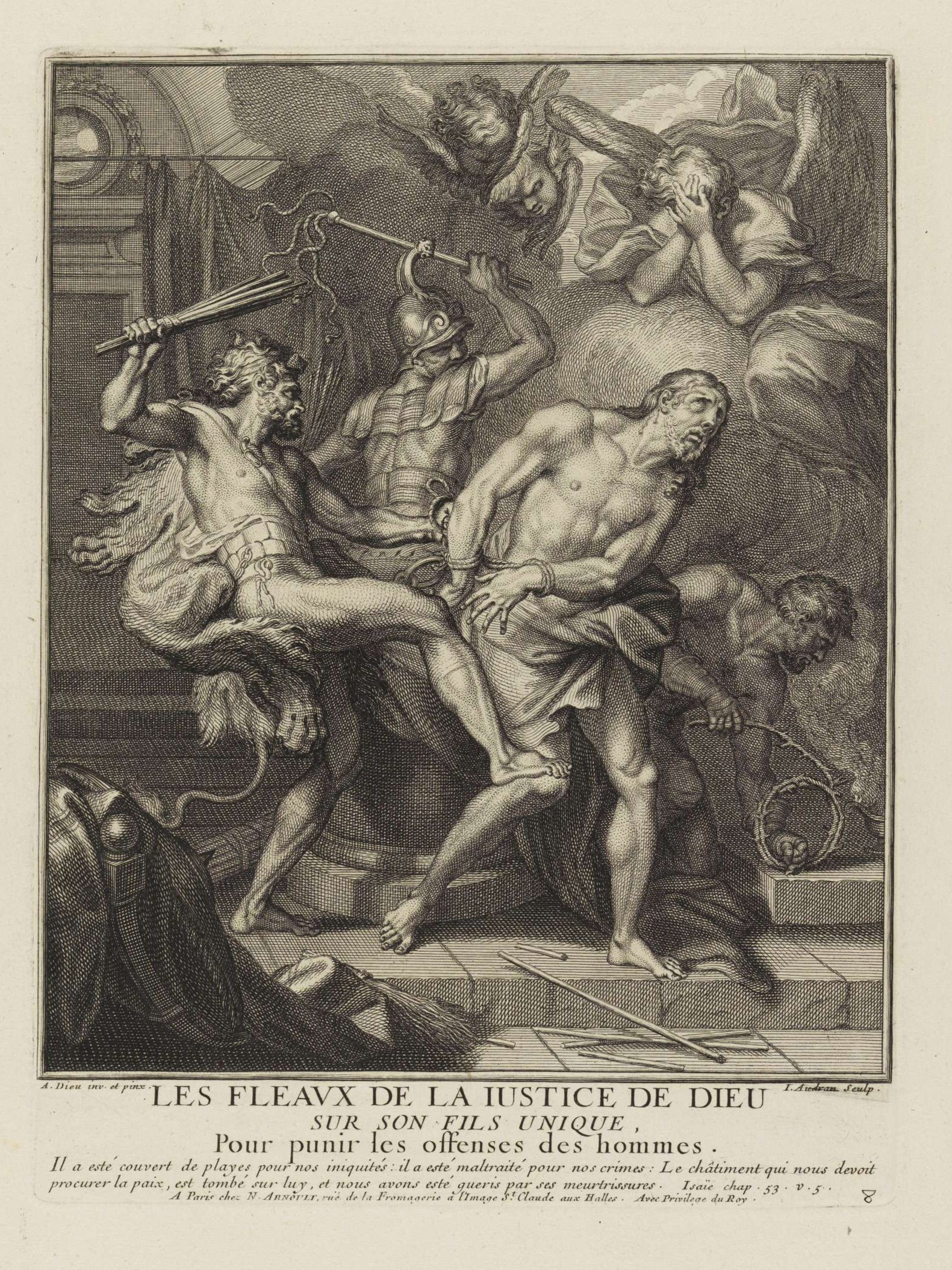
Engraving of the Flagellation, by Antoine Dieu

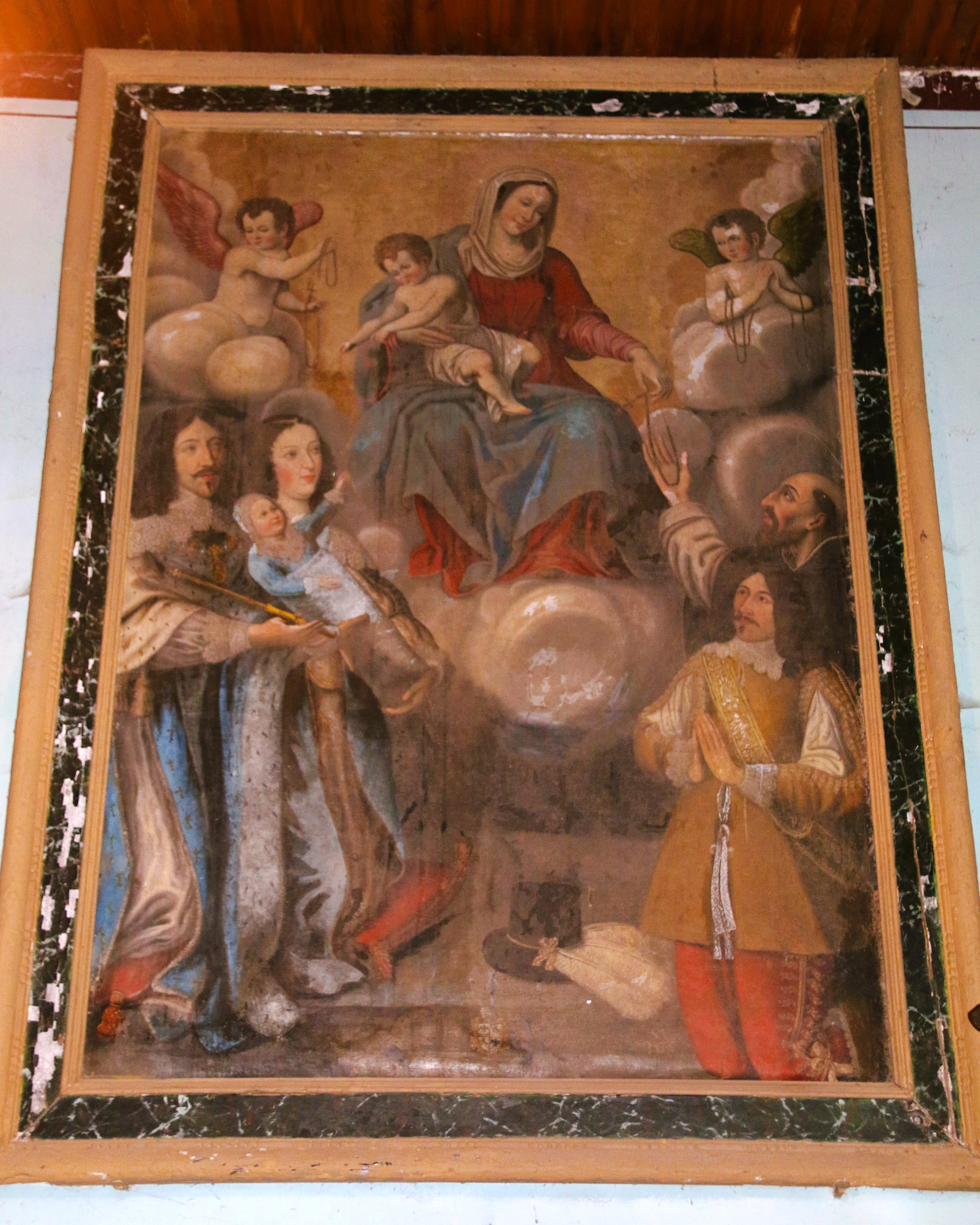
Our Lady of the Rosary, 1644

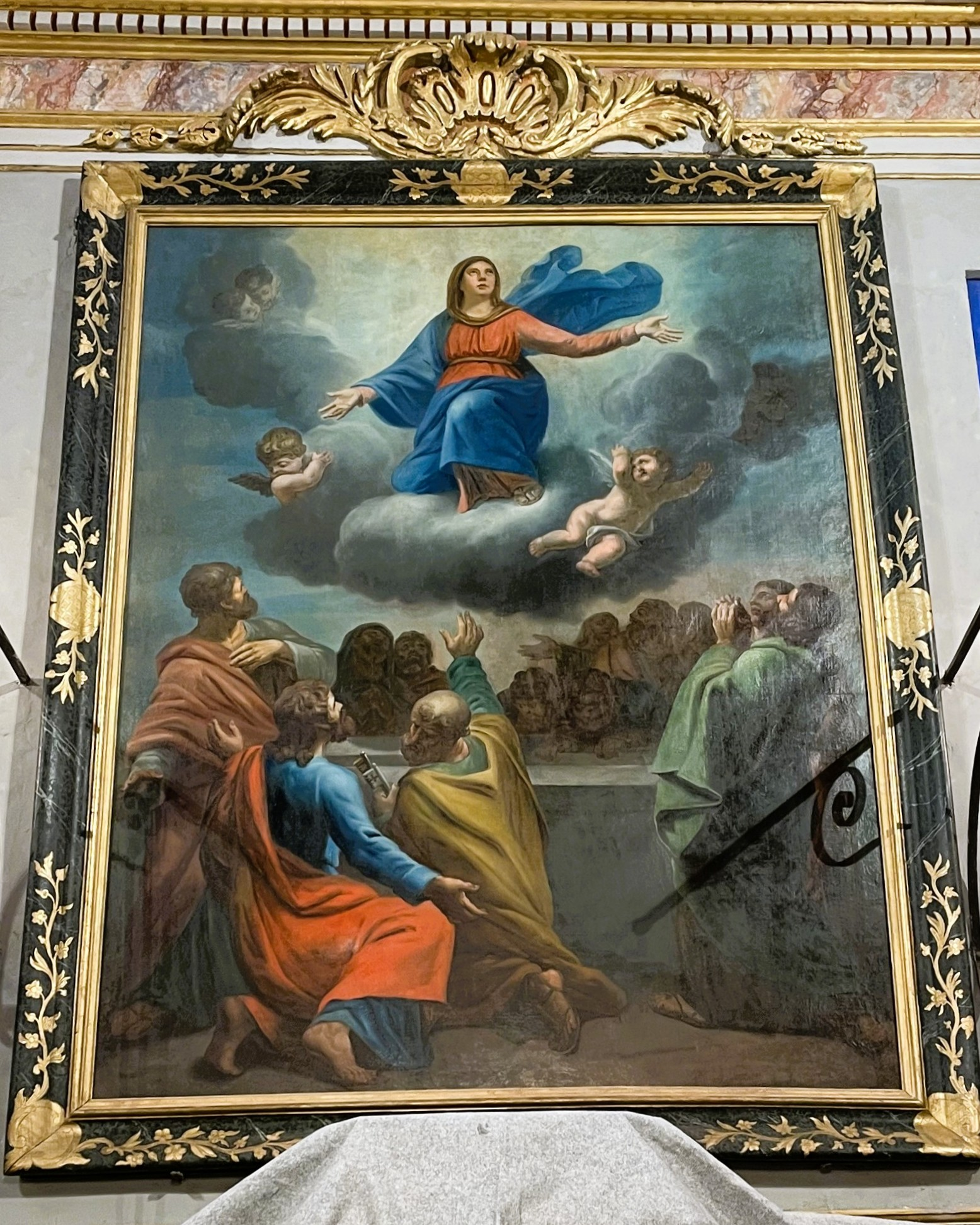
The Assumption of the Virgin, first quarter of the 18^{th} Century

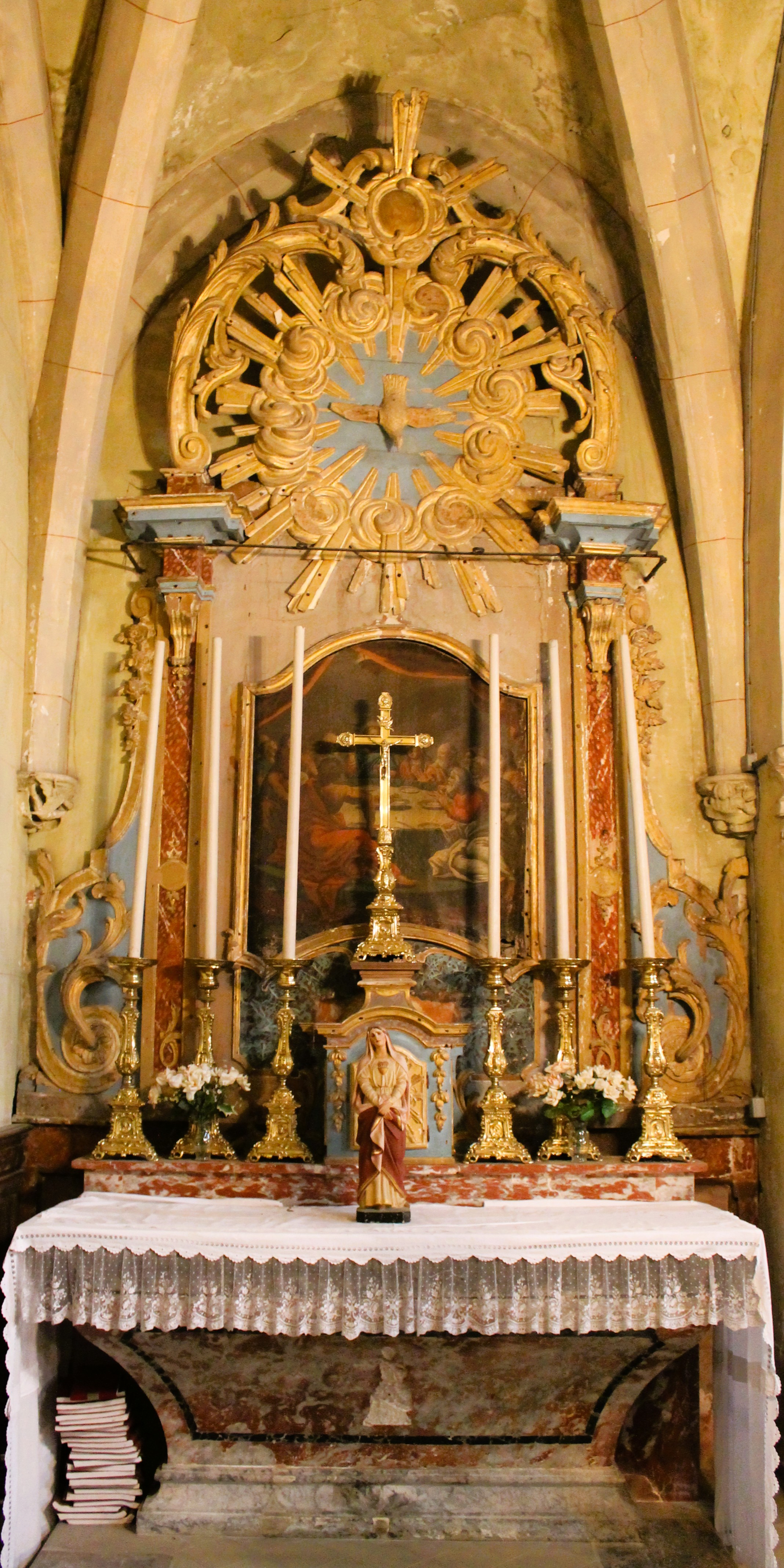
Rocaille-style altar decoration in a side chapel, mid-18th century

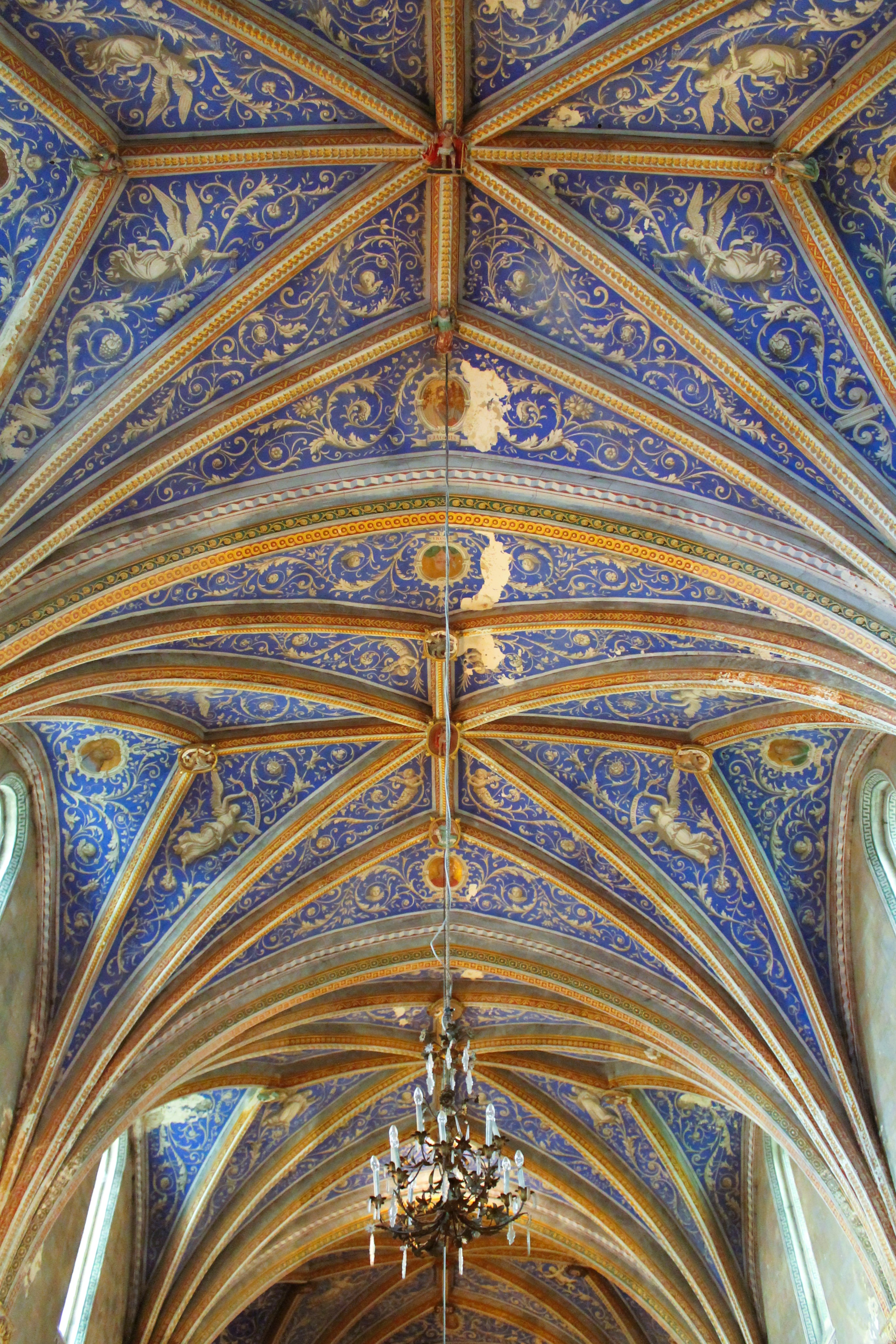
Neo-Renaissance painted ceiling, 1860s

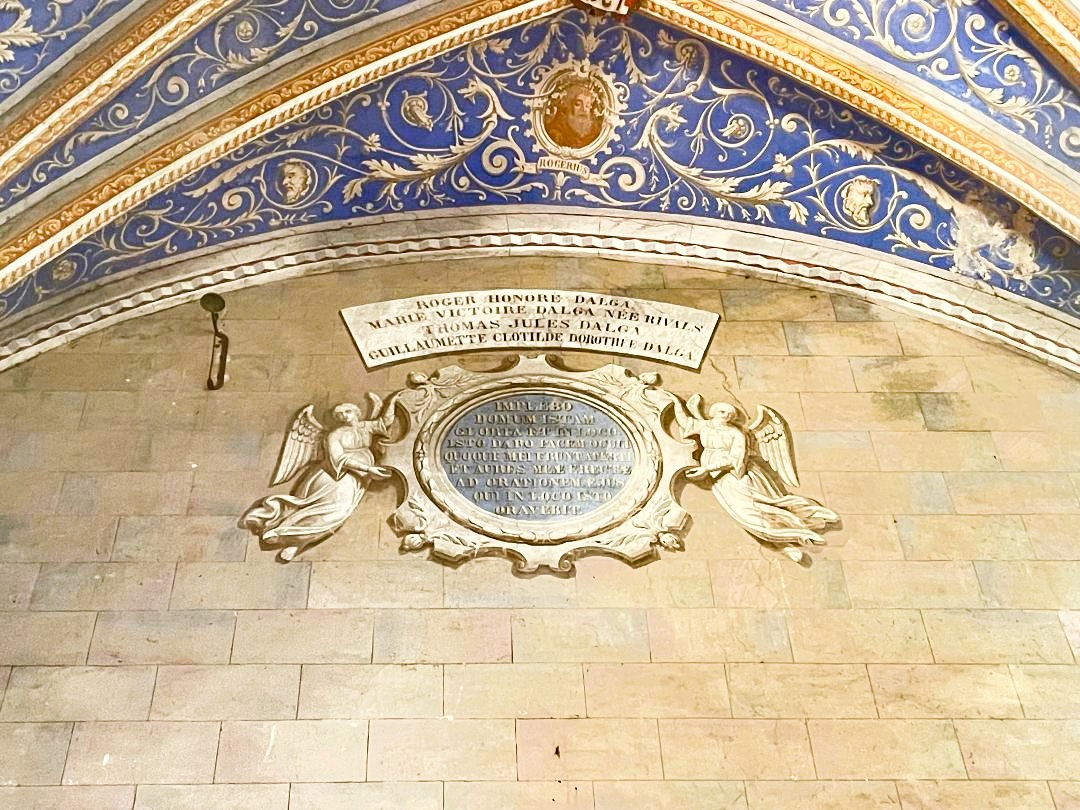
Painted inscription commemorating the patrons of the 19th-century restoration

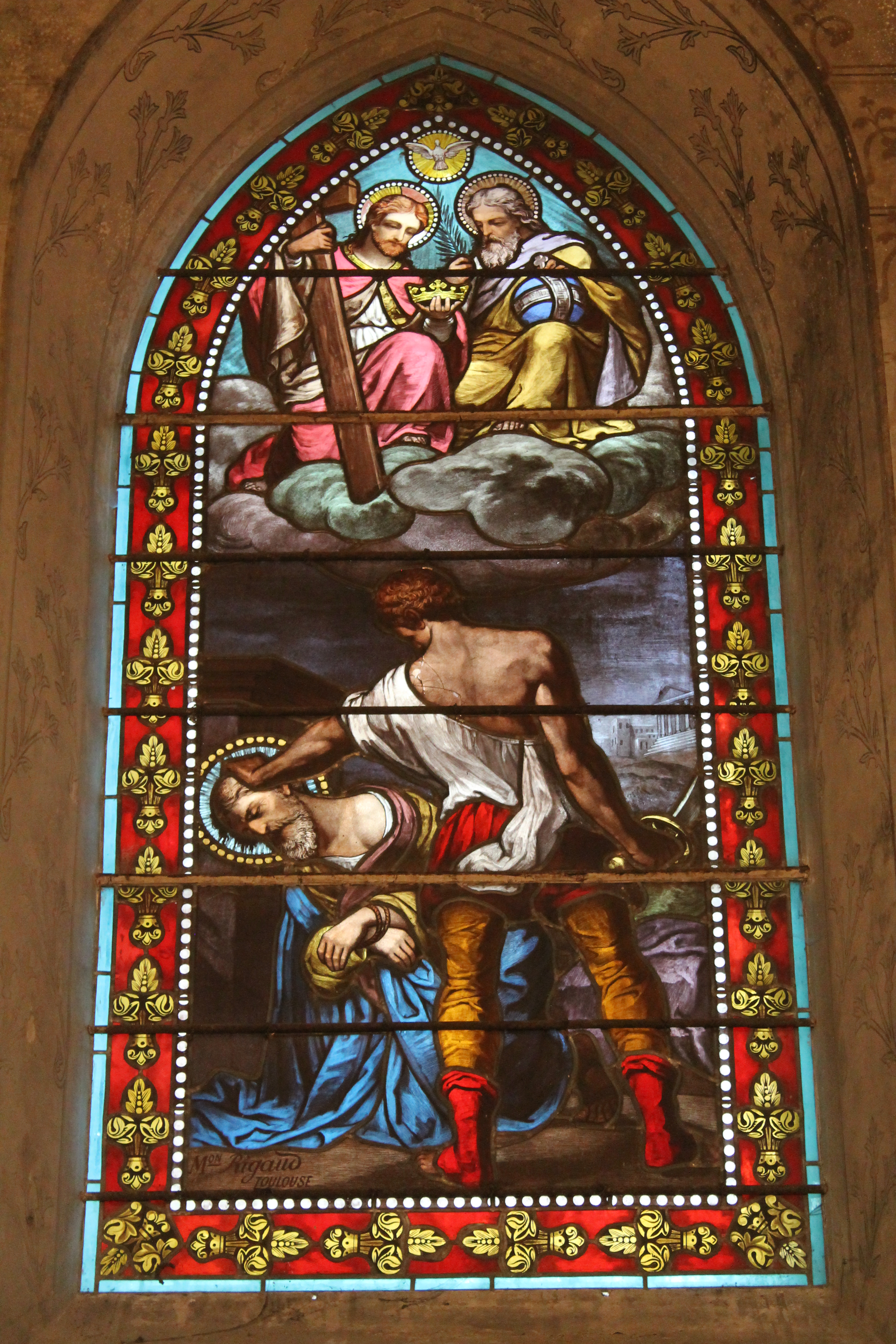
Stained-glass window of the martyrdom of Saint Primus, 1888

== See also ==
- Southern French Gothic
- Woad
- Lauragais
- Bastide
- Albi Cathedral
