= Lasserre-de-Prouille =

Commune in Occitanie, France

- Commune
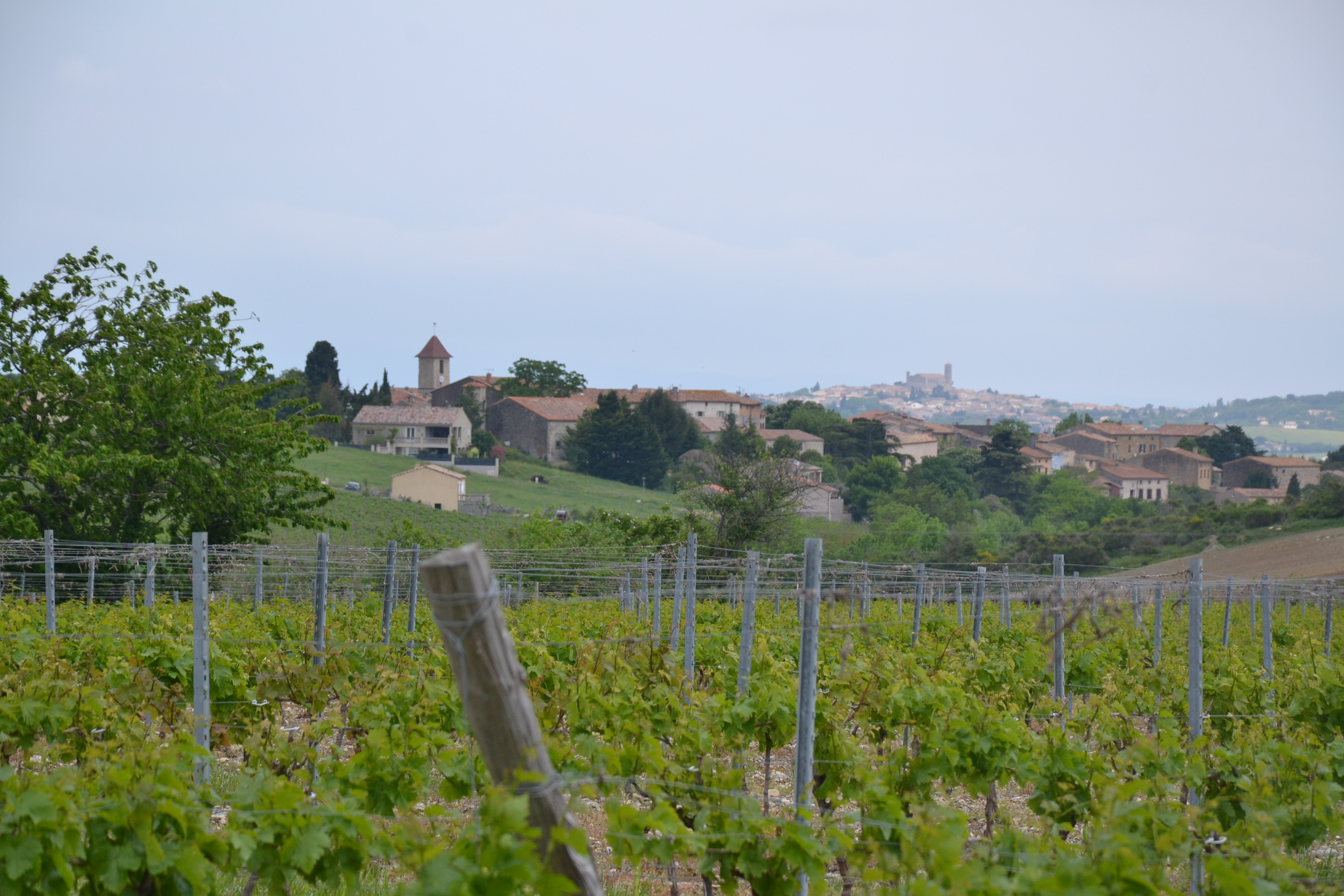
- A general view of Lasserre-de-Prouille

- Coat of arms
- Location of Lasserre-de-Prouille
- Location within France Location within Occitanie
- Coordinates: 43°10′49″N 2°05′01″E
- Country: France
- Region: Occitania
- Department: Aude
- Arrondissement: Carcassonne
- Canton: La Piège au Razès

Government
  - Mayor (2020–2026): Eric Lannes
- Area^{1}: 4.16 km^{2} (1.61 sq mi)
- Elevation: 200 m (660 ft)
- Highest elevation: 302 m (991 ft)
- Lowest elevation: 197 m (646 ft)
- Population (2023): 292
  - Density: 70.2/km^{2} (182/sq mi)
- Time zone: UTC+01:00 (CET)
  - Summer (DST): UTC+02:00 (CEST)
- INSEE/Postal code: 11193 /11270
- ^{1} French Land Register data, which excludes lakes, ponds, glaciers > 1 km^{2} (0.386 sq mi or 247 acres) and river estuaries.

Lasserre-de-Prouille (French pronunciation: [lasɛʁ də pʁuj]; Occitan: La Sèrra de Prolha) is a commune in the Aude department in southern France.

Historically, the village is part of Lauragais, which is known as an area which produces woad and grenier à blé du Languedoc ("Languedoc's granary"). The climate is typically Mediterranean.

== Population ==
Historical population
Year	Pop.	±% p.a.
1968	189	—
1975	199	+0.74%
1982	177	−1.66%
1990	174	−0.21%
1999	202	+1.67%
2007	224	+1.30%
2012	235	+0.96%
2017	267	+2.59%
2023	292	+1.50%
Source: INSEE

== Geography ==
The village is situated on the eastern end of a hill, culminating at Bon Majou at 305 metres above sea level.

== Hydrology ==
The village is located within the Rhone Mediterranean Corsica hydrological basin. It is irrigated by the surrounding streams of the "Ruisseau de la Force", "Ruisseau de Rivals" and "Ruisseau de Pradel", which together form a drainage network 6 km long.

== Transport ==
Lasserre-de-Prouille is served by the Route Départementale 623, which links Castelnaudary to the north-west and Limoux to the south-east. The closest train station is in the village of Bram (11.5 km).

== See also ==
- Communes of the Aude department
