= Paul Sibra =

French painter (1889-1951)

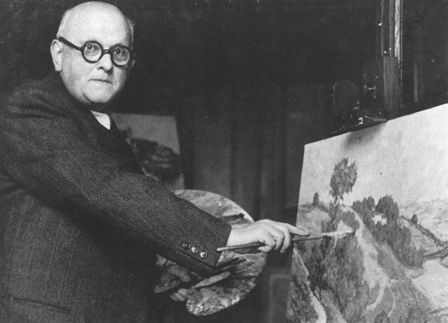
- Born: September 10, 1889; Castelnaudary, France
- Died: March 21, 1951 (aged 61)
- Other name: le peintre du Lauragais
- Occupation: Painter

Paul Sibra (10 September 1889 – 24 March 1951) was a French regionalist painter, painter of religious scenes, landscapes and portraits.

Paul Sibra is nicknamed "le peintre du Lauragais", after his native region.

== Biography ==
Paul Sibra was born in 1889 in Castelnaudary in a well-off family of fabric shopkeepers. After 4 years of training before and after First World War in the Académie Julian of Paris (his master was Jean-Paul Laurens), Sibra travelled in France, Belgium, Tunisia and later in Italy, creating many travel sketchbooks on the way. Following the Great War, Paul Sibra was part of the general movement called "return to order", that rejected the excesses of the avant-garde and encouraged a revival of classicism and realistic painting. Participating to the Salon's exhibitions, he spent some years living between Paris and Castelnaudary, before he turned back for good to his beloved Lauragais, in the Castelnaudary area at the end of the 1920s.

Sibra was close to the félibrige movement and he built his fame portraying defenders of the occitanian culture and language such as poets, writers and actors. During the 1930s, he had some success as a portraitist for military and clergy men. Through the same period, he started to document and paint Lauragais villages and rural landscapes. His masterpiece is a large landscape, with scenes of agricultural work, that can be understood as an allegory of "nurturing earth", alluding to the reputed abundant agricultural production of Lauragais (The Lauragais, 1929).

Paul Sibra died of a heart attack in 1951 at the age of 62. He left over 1,500 paintings and several thousands of drawings.

== See also ==
- Lauragais
