= Lauragais =

Parçan of Occitania

Coordinates: 43°15′N 01°55′E

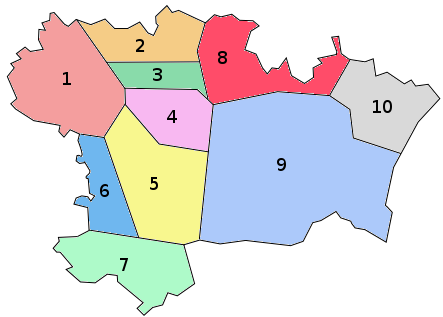
Map of the Aude department; the Lauragais is numbered 1.

The Lauragais (French pronunciation: [lɔʁaɡɛ]; Occitan: Lauragués) is an area of the south-west of France that is south-east of Toulouse.

The Lauragais, a former county in the south-west of France, takes its name from the town of Laurac and has a large area. It covers both sides of the Canal du Midi, between Toulouse in the north-west and Carcassonne in the south-east and between Castres in the north-east and Pamiers in the south-west.

Known from sources since the 11th century, the Lauragais has been alternately an archdeaconry, diocese, county and sénéchaussée (bailiwick). It has been divided up since the French Revolution into four départements: Haute-Garonne, Aude, Ariège and Tarn.

The rural area is known for its abundant agricultural production. The fact was evidenced in the Lauragais's past nicknames: "Pays de Cocagne" ("Cockaigne"), related to the growing of woad, and grenier à blé du Languedoc ("Languedoc's granary"), referring to the specialisation of its economy in wheat export since the 17th century because of the Canal du Midi. It is also famous for its dried haricot beans, the lingots de Lauragais, which are used in cassoulet.

The region is also famous for its history, especially the role that it played during religious conflicts (the Albigensian Crusade and the French Wars of Religion) and for its interesting local heritage: the Canal du Midi and its springs, abbeys and churches, castles, disk-shaped steles, dovecotes, windmills, bastides etc.

The local poet Auguste Fourès and painter Paul Sibra immortalised the Lauragais in their respective works.

== Bibliography ==
- Taylor, Colin Duncan (2018). Lauragais: Steeped in History, Soaked in Blood. Troubador Publishing. ISBN 1789015839.
