= List of châteaux in Languedoc-Roussillon =

This is the list of châteaux, which are located in the former region of Languedoc-Roussillon.

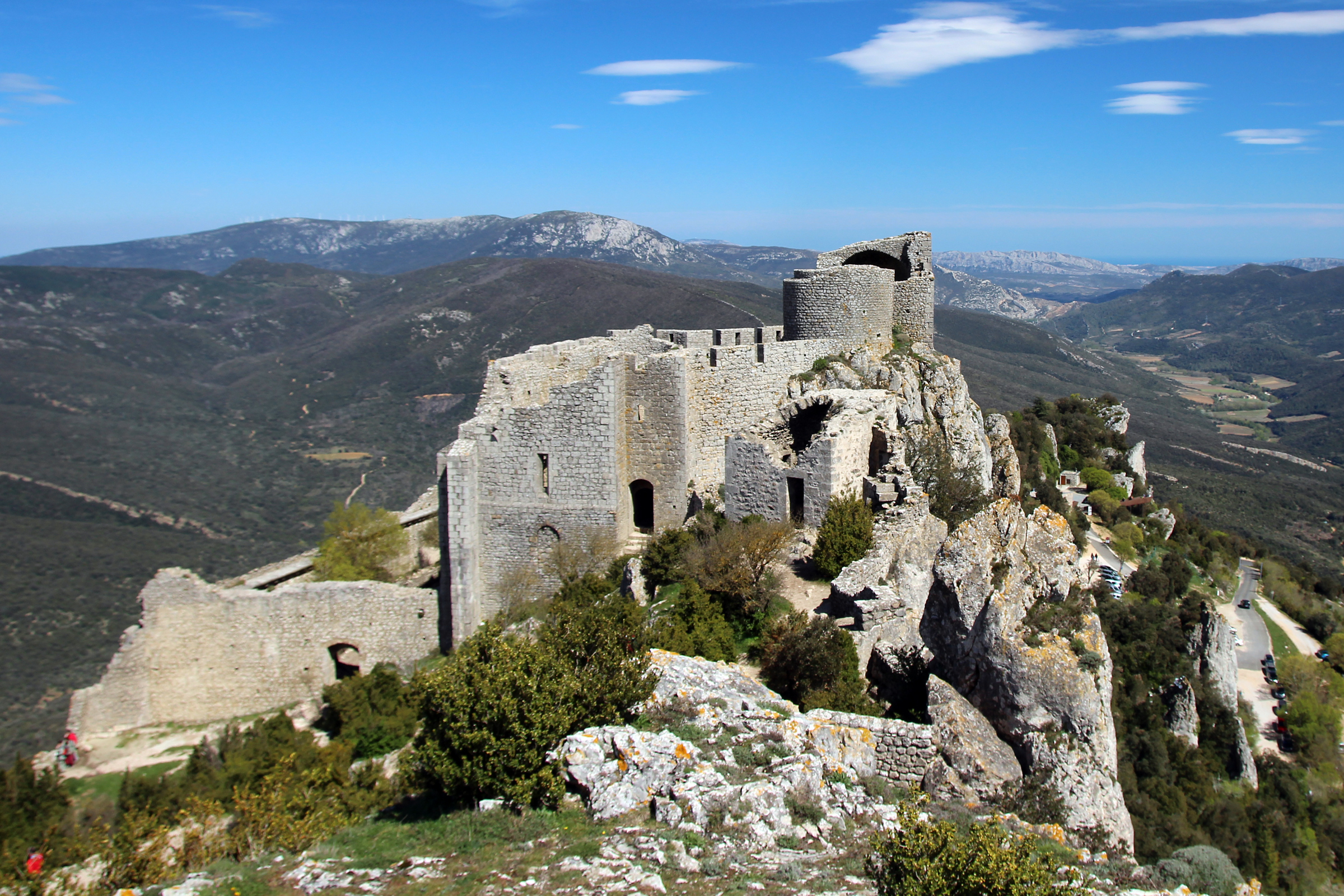
Château de Peyrepertuse

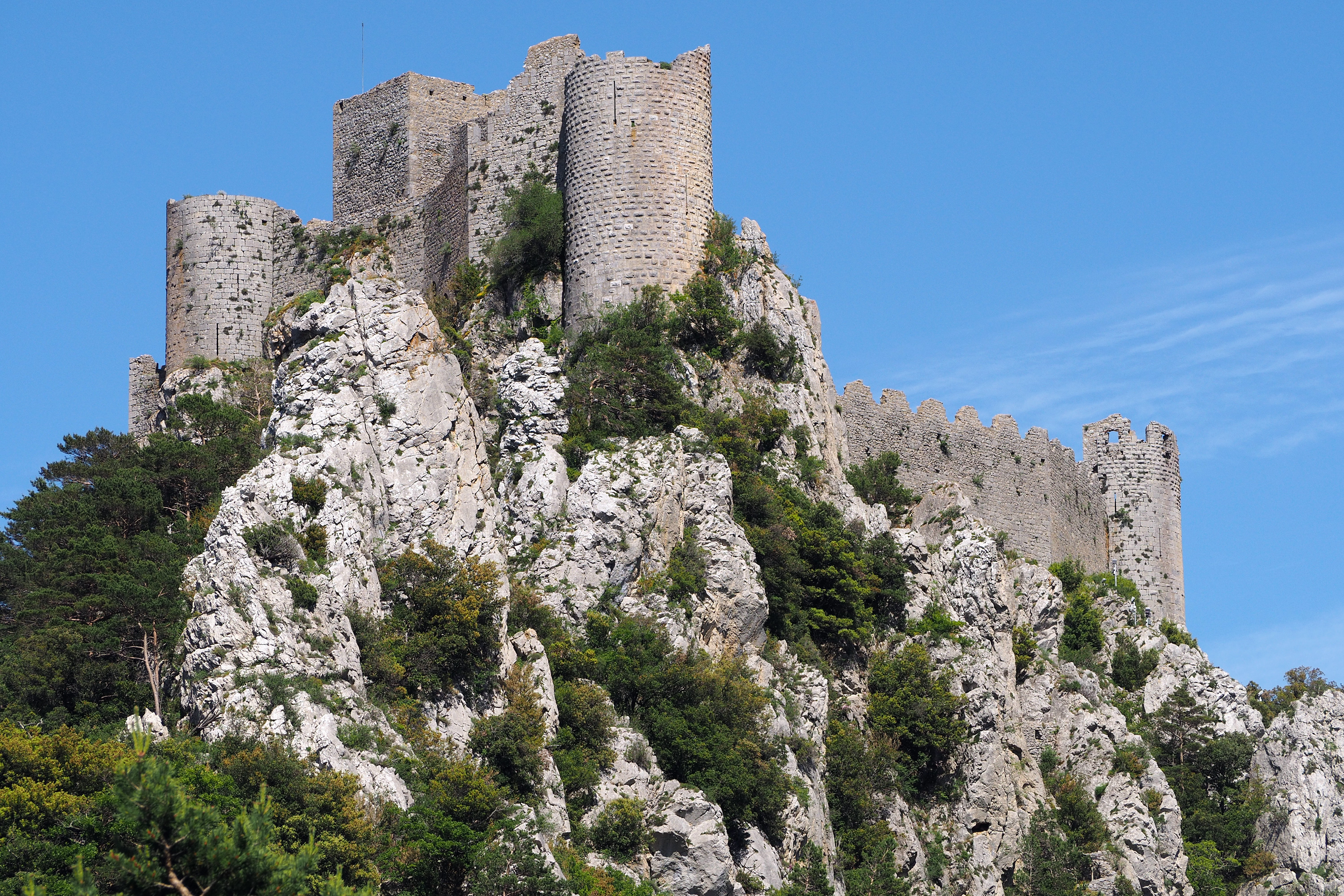
Château de Puilaurens

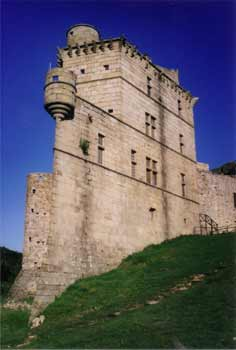
Château de Portes

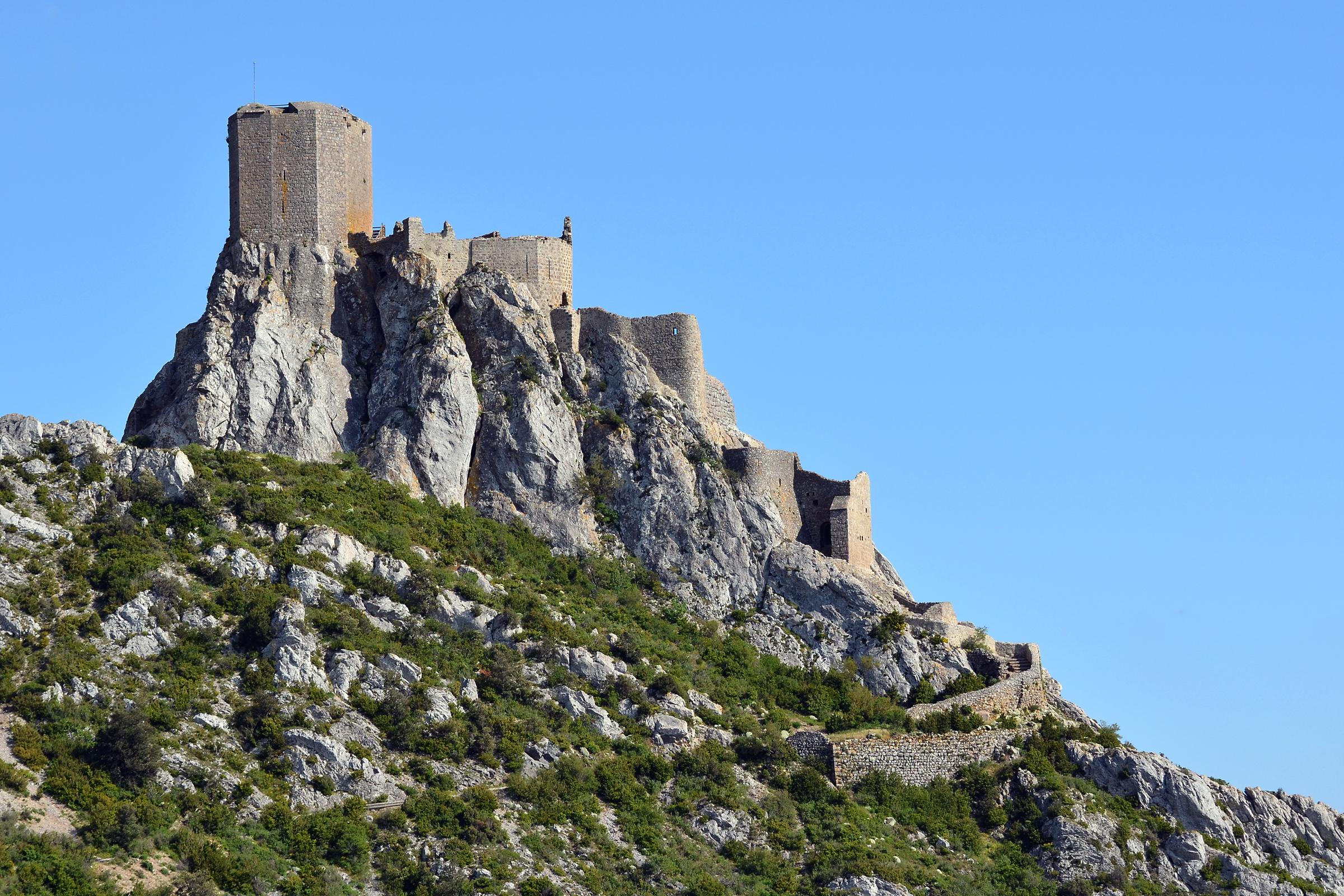
Château de Quéribus

== Aude ==
- Château d'Aguilar, in Tuchan
- Château d'Albières, in Albières
- Château d’Arques, in Arques
- Château d'Auriac, in Auriac
- Château de Blanchefort, in Rennes-les-Bains
- Château de Bouisse, in Bouisse
- Château de Bugarach, in Bugarach
- Château de Camps-sur-l'Agly, in Camps-sur-l'Agly
- Cité de Carcassonne, in Carcassonne
- Château de Castel d'Ase, in Soulatgé
- Château de Coustaussa, in Coustaussa
- Château de Cucugnan, in Cucugnan
- Château de Domneuve, in Tuchan
- Château de Durban-Corbières, in Durban-Corbières
- Château de Durfort, in Vignevieille
- Château de Fa, in Fa
- Tour Barberousse, in Gruissan
- Châteaux de Lastours, in Lastours (4 châteaux : Cabaret, Quertinheux, Surdespine and Tour Régine)
- Château de Montferrand, in Montferrand
- Château de Padern, in Padern
- Château de Paulignan, in Trausse
- Château de Peyrepertuse, in Duilhac-sous-Peyrepertuse
- Château de Pieusse, in Pieusse
- Château de Puilaurens, in Lapradelle-Puilaurens
- Château de Puivert, in Puivert
- Château de Quéribus, in Cucugnan
- Château de Quillan, in Quillan
- Château de Saissac, in Saissac
- Château de Saint-Ferriol, in Saint-Ferriol
- Château de Termes, in Termes
- Château de Villerouge la Crémade, in Fabrezan
- Château de Villerouge-Termenès, in Villerouge-Termenès

== Gard ==
- Ramparts of Aigues-Mortes, in Aigues-Mortes
- Château d'Allègre, in Allègre-les-Fumades
- Cheylard d'Aujac, in Aujac
- Château des Barbuts, in Saint-André-de-Valborgne
- Château de Boissières, in Boissières
- Château de Brésis, in Ponteils-et-Brésis
- Château de Candiac, in Vestric-et-Candiac
- Château d'Espeyran, in Saint-Gilles
- Château de Générac, in Générac
- Château de Mandajors, in Saint-Paul-la-Coste
- Château de Montdardier, in Montdardier
- Château de Pondres à Villevieille
- Château de Portes, in Portes
- Fort Saint-André à Villeneuve-lès-Avignon
- Château de Saint-Jean-du-Gard, in Saint-Jean-du-Gard
- Château de Saint-Laurent-Le-Minier, in Saint-Laurent-le-Minier
- Château d'Uzès, in Uzès
- Château de Vissec, in Vissec

== Hérault ==
- Château d'Aumelas, in Aumelas
- Château de Bouloc, in Ceilhes-et-Rocozels
- Château de Cabrières, in Cabrières
- Château de Capion, in Gignac
- Château de Castries, in Castries
- Château de Dio-et-Valquières, in Dio-et-Valquières
- Château du Géant, in Saint-Guilhem-le-Désert
- Château des Guilhem, in Clermont-l'Hérault
- Château de Lavagnac, in Montagnac
- Château de Malavieille, in Mérifons
- Château de Margon, in Margon
- Château de Marsillargues, in Marsillargues
- Château de Minerve, in Minerve
- Château de la Mogère, in Montpellier
- Château de Montferrand, in Saint-Mathieu-de-Tréviers
- Château de Montplaisir, in Lodève
- Château de Pézenas, in Pézenas
- Château de Ribaute, in Lieuran-lès-Béziers
- Château de Saint-Maurice, in Saint-Maurice-Navacelles
- Château de Flaugergues, near Montpellier

== Lozère ==
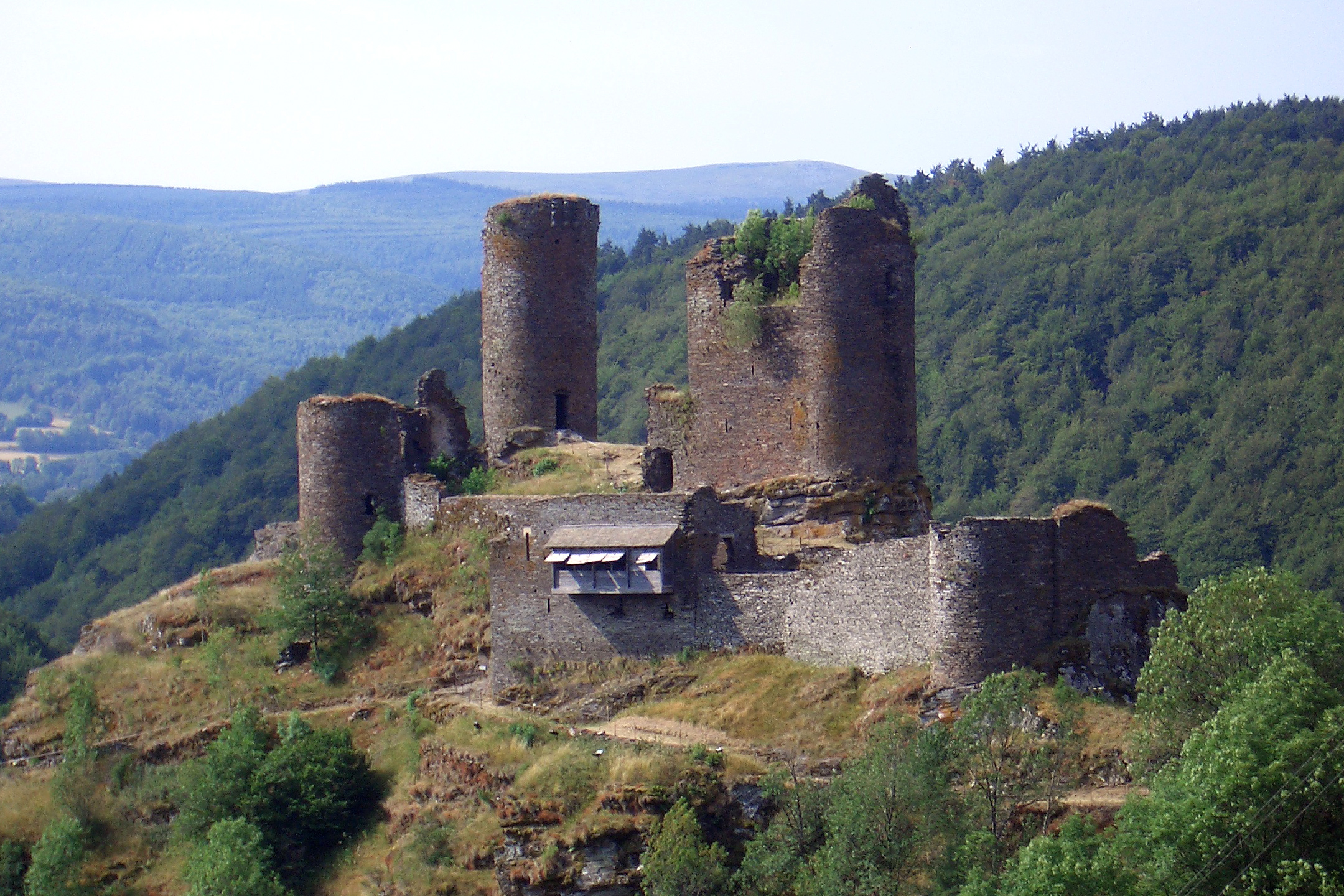
Le château féodal des barons du Tournel, en Gévaudan

Type	Nom	Commune	Notes
Ruin	Château d'Apcher	Prunières	An intact keep is almost the only remaining trace of the Château
Renaissance	Château d'Ayres	Meyrueis	Now a luxury hotel & restaurant
Renaissance	Château de la Baume	Prinsuéjols	The "Versailles of Lozère". Now a private home
Renaissance	Château du Boy	Lanuéjols	Now a drug rehabilitation centre
Castle	Château de Calberte	Saint-Germain-de-Calberte	Entirely restored
-	Château de Cambiaire	Saint-Étienne-Vallée-Française	-
Renaissance	Château de Castanet	Pourcharesses	Entirely restored
Ruin	Château de Castelbouc	Sainte-Enimie	-
Ruin	Château de Chanac	Chanac	An intact keep is almost the only remaining trace of the Château
Ruin	Château de Chapieu	Lanuéjols	-
Renaissance	Château de la Caze	Laval-du-Tarn	Now a luxury hotel & restaurant
-	Château du Champ	Altier	-
-	Château de Florac	Florac	Head office of the Cévennes National Park
Ruin	Château de la Garde	Albaret-Sainte-Marie	-
-	Château de Grizac	Le Pont-de-Montvert	-
Ruin	Château de Luc	Luc	-
Ruin	Château de Meyrueis	Meyrueis	Demolished in 1632 and replaced with the Notre-Dame du Rocher chapel (1875)
Castle	Château de Miral	Bédouès	-
Ruin	Château de Montferrand	La Canourgue	-
Renaissance	Château de Montjézieu	La Canourgue	-
Ruin	Château de Montialoux	Saint-Bauzile	-
Renaissance	Château de Roquedols	Meyrueis	Information centre for the Cévennes National Park
-	Château de Saint-Alban	Saint-Alban-sur-Limagnole	Now a psychiatric hospital, also houses the tourist office and part of the collection of the museum of Mende
Ruin	Château de Saint-Julien-d'Arpaon	Saint-Julien-d'Arpaon	-
Castle	Château de Saint-Saturnin	Saint-Saturnin	-
-	Château du Solier	Saint-Hilaire-de-Lavit	-
Castle	Château du Tournel	Saint-Julien-du-Tournel	-
Castle	Château de Villaret	Allenc	Centrepiece of the Vallon du Villaret park

== Pyrénées-Orientales ==
Type	Nom	Commune	Notes
	Château de Campôme	Campôme	-
Castle	Château de Canet-en-Roussillon	Canet-en-Roussillon	-
Castle	Château de Castelnou	Castelnou	-
Castle	Château Royal de Collioure	Collioure	-
	Château de Fenouillet	Fenouillet	-
	Fort Lagarde	Prats-de-Mollo-la-Preste	-
	Fort Libéria	Villefranche-de-Conflent	-
Palace	Palais des rois de Majorque	Perpignan	Classified as a Monument historique
	Fort de Salses	Salses-le-Château	-
Ruin	Château d'Ultrère	Argelès-sur-Mer	-

== See also ==
- List of castles in France
