= Château de Padern =

Ruined castle in Aude, France

Coordinates: 45°52′30″N 2°39′20″E

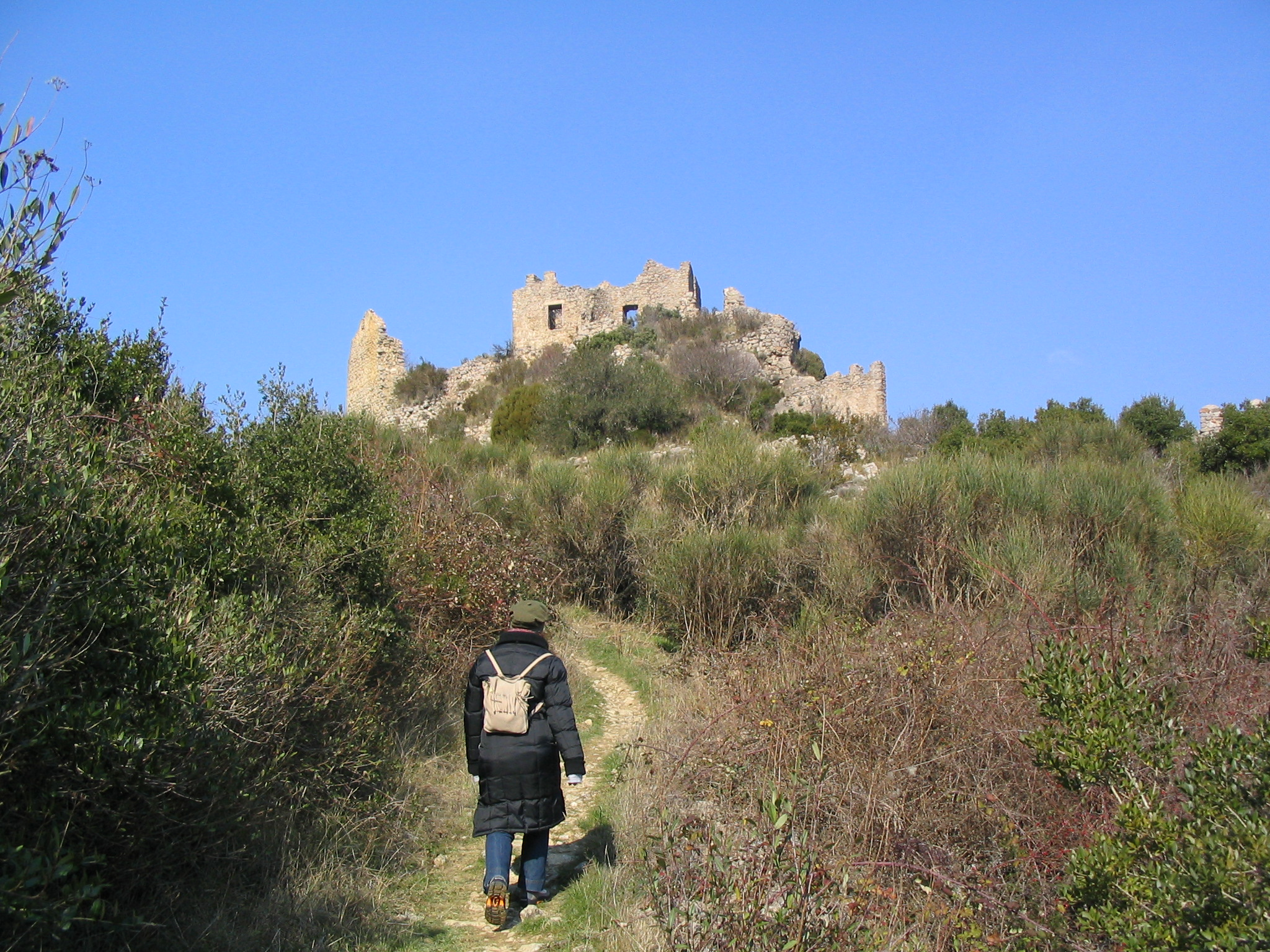

The Château de Padern is a ruined castle in the commune of Padern in the Aude département of France. It is one of the so-called Cathar castles.

== Position ==
The castle was built overlooking the village of Padern on a limestone peak that dominates the Verdouble river running past the village. The paths to reach it are very steep, which made it practically impregnable.

== History ==
The castle is little known in the area, because it did not play a very important part during the crusade against the Albigensians, unlike the neighbouring castles of Termes, Queribus or Peyrepertuse.

The exact year of construction is not known, but the village of Padern is recorded in 899, when Charles III, known as Charles the Simple, ceded the territory to Lagrasse Abbey, while the latter still belonged to the Counts of Toulouse, and not to the crown of France.

The fortification is mentioned for the first time in 1026, and a secondary fortification (forcia) at the end of the 12th century, placed under the control of the Abbey of Lagrasse.

During the Albigensian Crusade, Chabert de Barbeira, companion in arms of Olivier de Termes, protector of the Cathars and lord of Quéribus, seized the place. After the capture of Quéribus, he negotiated his freedom for the abandonment of the citadels to King Louis IX.

The Abbey of Lagrasse thus recovered the castle, and in 1283, became the official proprietor through a transaction with Philip III of France (Philippe the Bold). The abbey remained the owner until 1579.

At the end of the 16th century, after the Wars of Religion, Pierre de Vic, originally from Girona (Catalonia), acquired the castle and made some additions, though conserving its feudal aspect. In 1706, his descendants resold the whole property to the Abbey of Lagrasse, which abandoned it at the end of the 18th century.

== Today ==
The castle is no more that ruins. Not being classified as a monument historique, the site is completely forsaken, and its state worsens day by day.

== Gallery ==
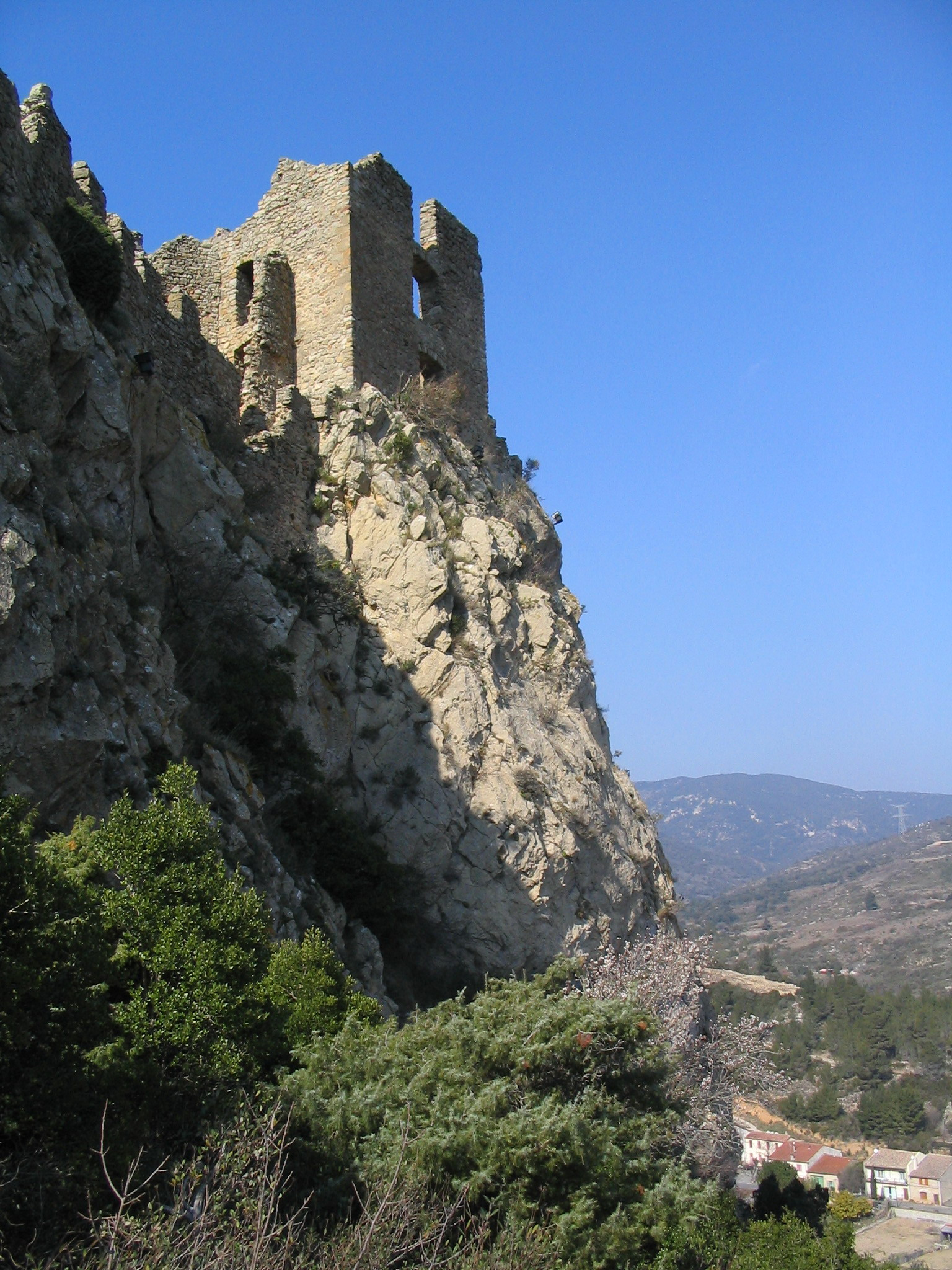
The castle

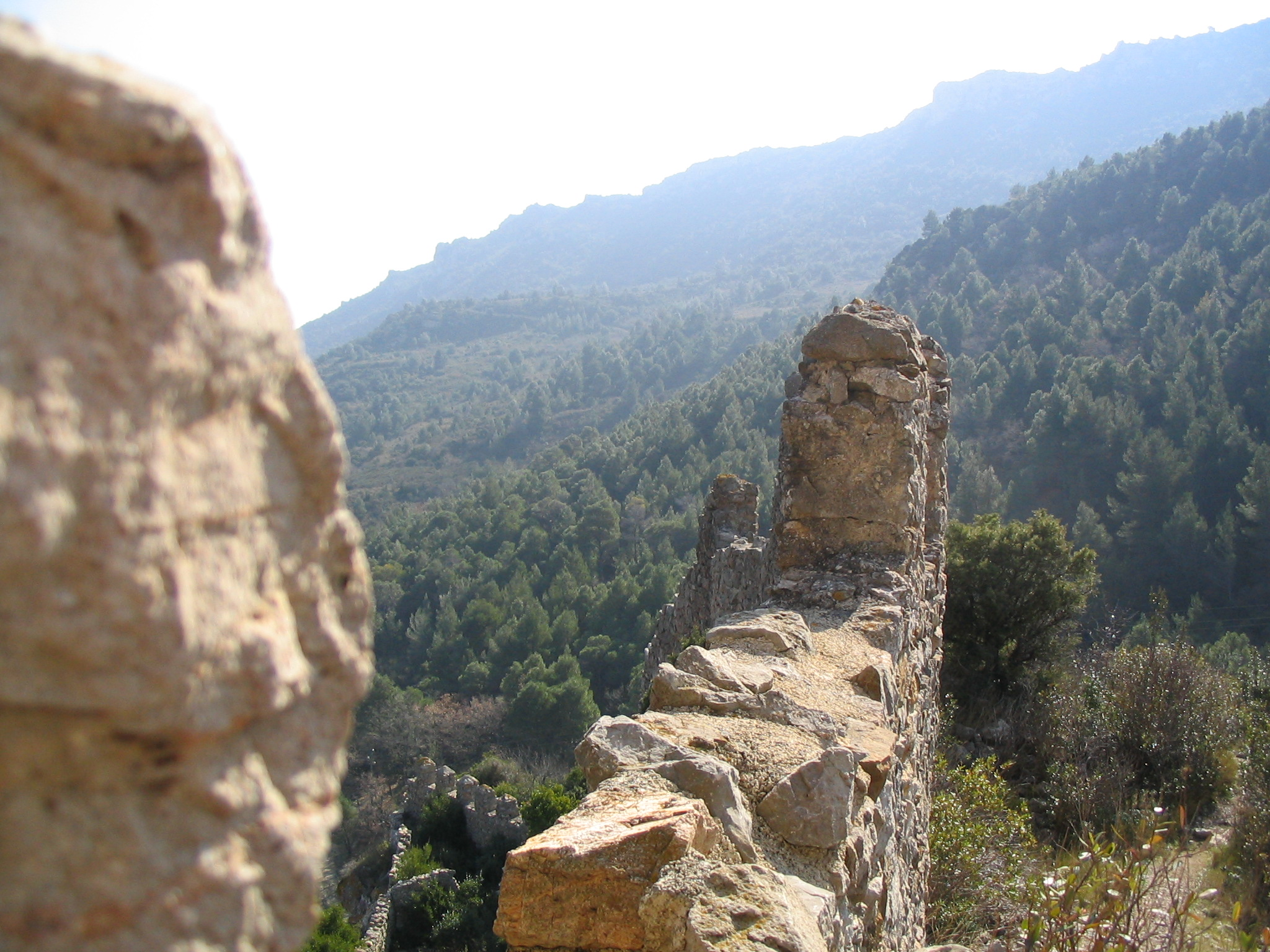
The castle

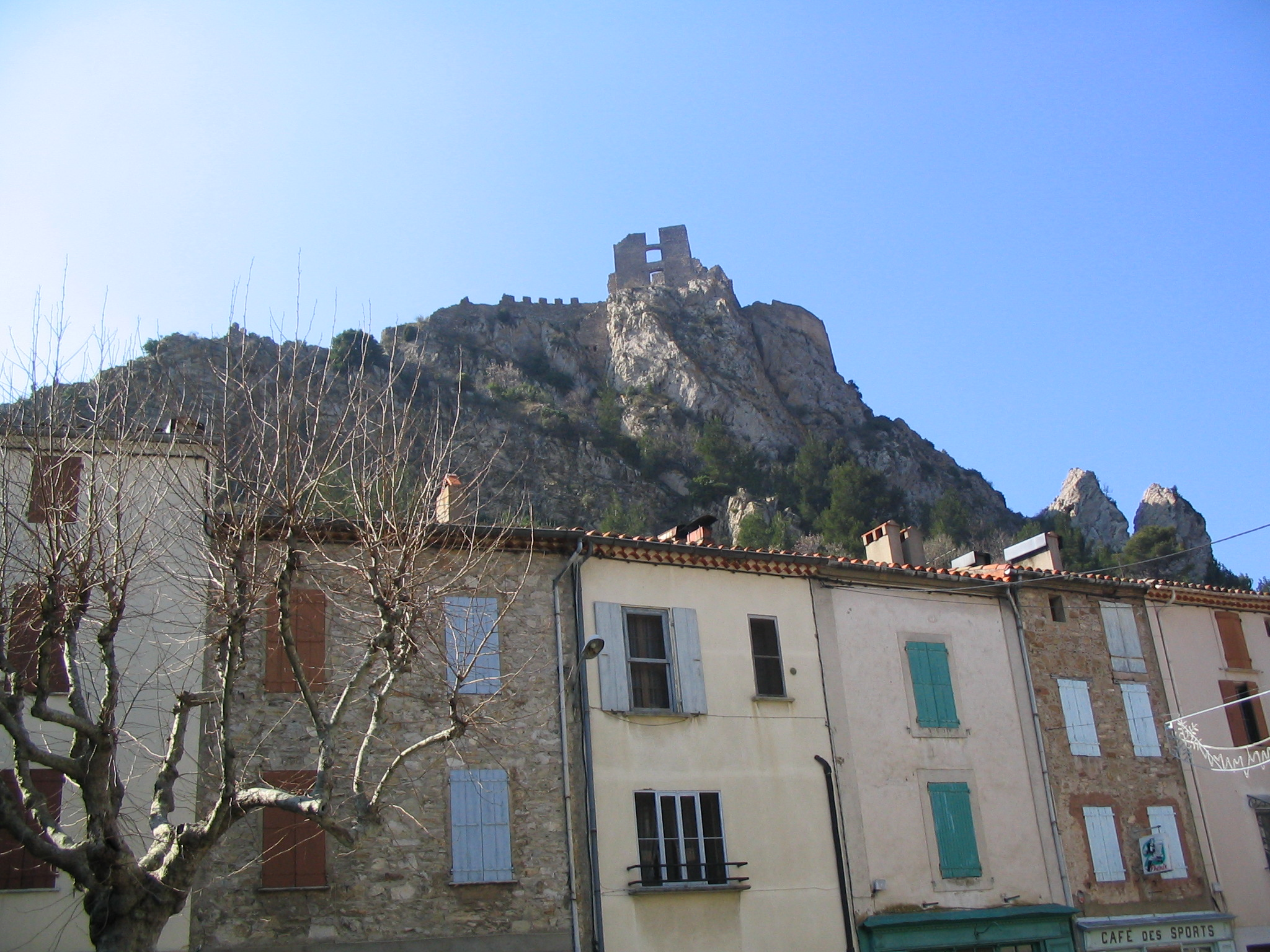
The village and the castle

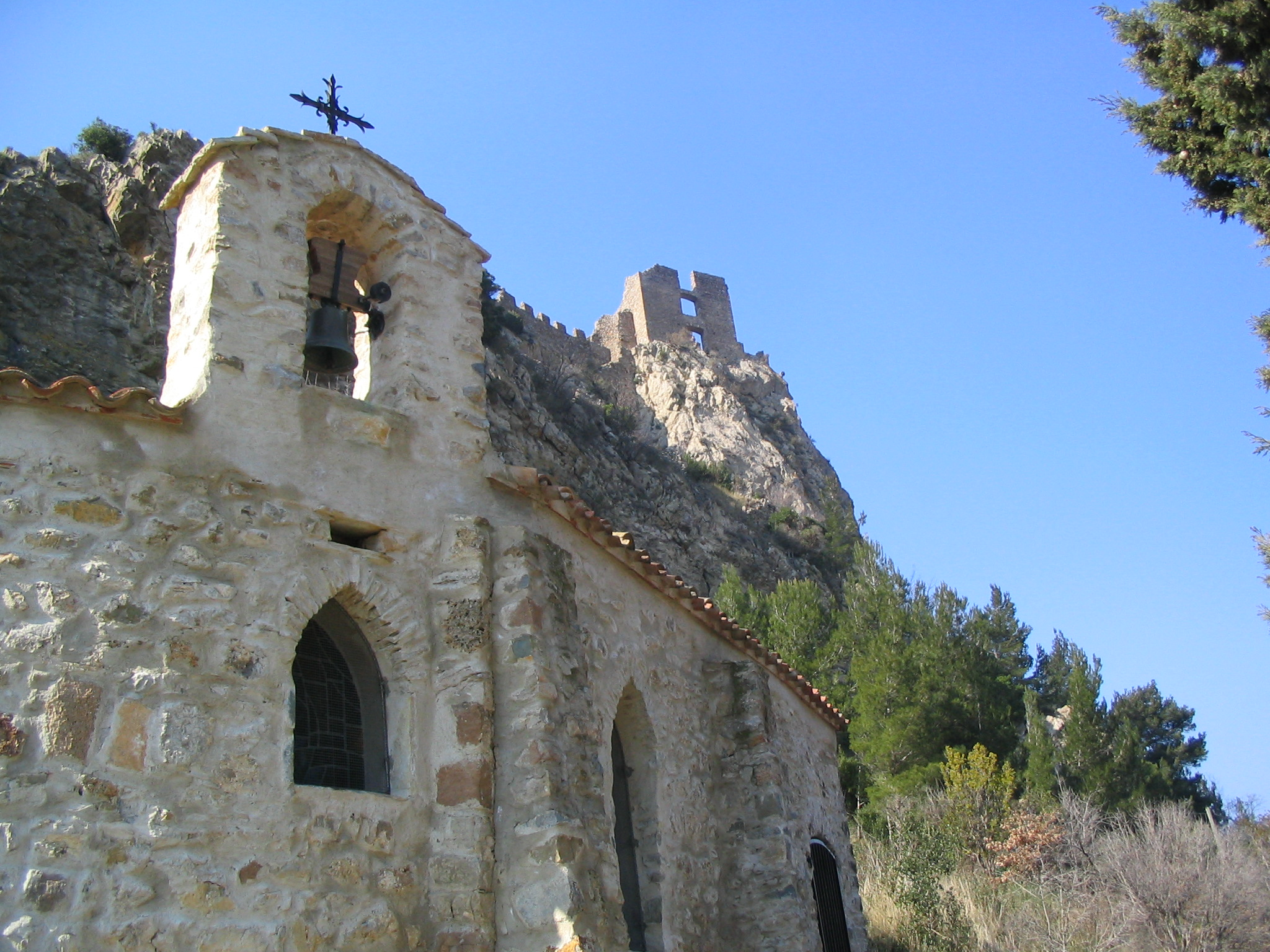
The village and the castle

== See also ==
- List of castles in France

== Bibliography ==
- Jacques-Alphonse Mahul : Cartulaire et Archives des communes de l'ancien diocèse et de l'arrondissement administratif de Carcassonne
- Gauthier Langlois (2001). Olivier de Termes, le cathare et le croisé (vers 1200-1274). Domaine cathare. Toulouse: Éditions Privat. p. 288. ISBN 2-7089-7520-X.
- Agnès and Robert Vinas : La conquête de Majorque
