= Château de Durfort =

Ruined castle of France

Coordinates: 43°01′02″N 2°32′55″E

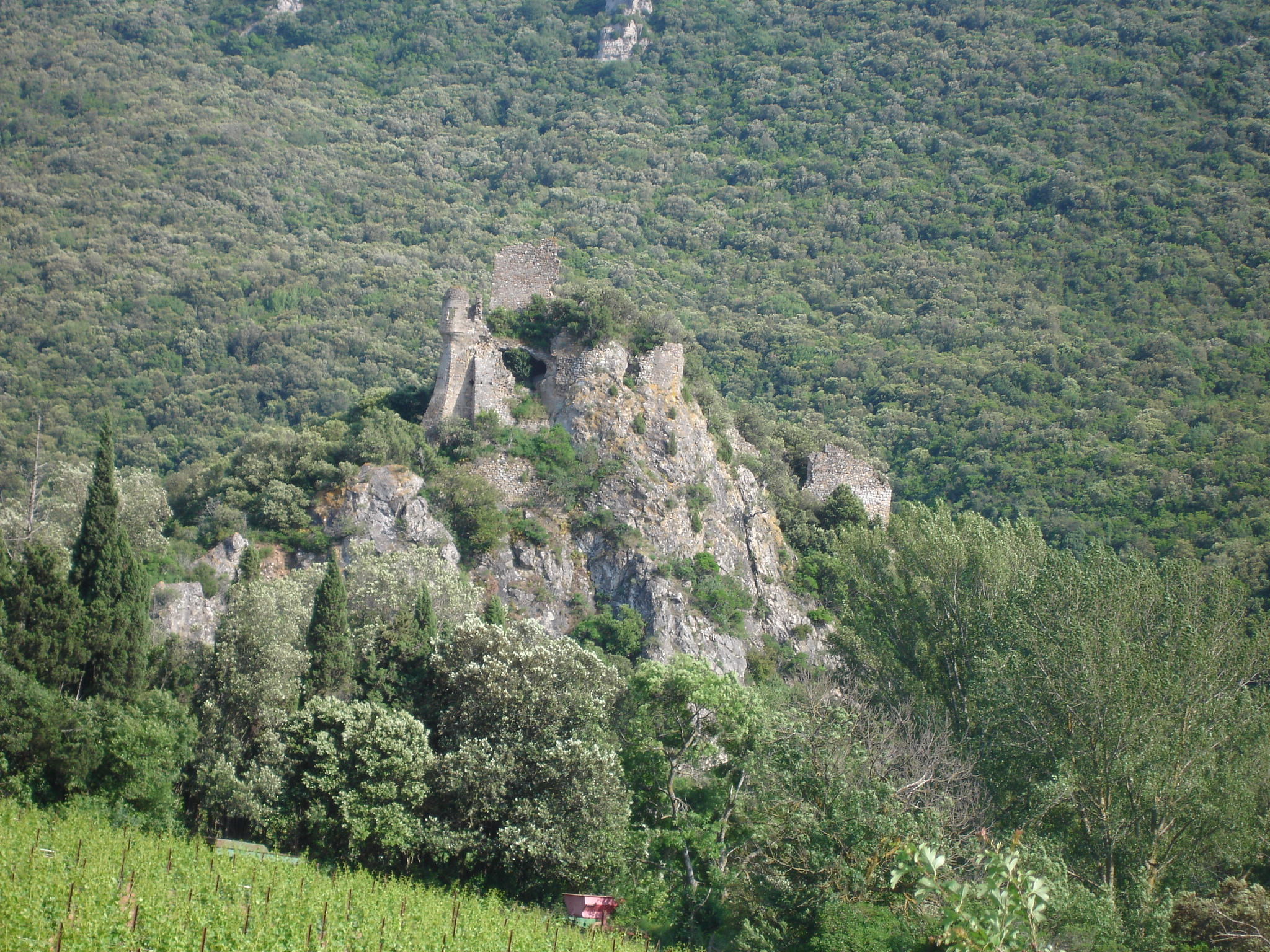
Château de Durfort

The Château de Durfort is a ruined castle in the commune of Vignevieille in the Aude département of France. It is 27 km east of Limoux and 3 km north of the Château de Termes.

It was erected on a rocky piton which overlooks the valley of the Orbieu. The present ruins are those of a strengthened habitat, including a chapel, dwellings with rectangular windows and a tower. High thick walls, cellars and wells, arched rooms of square buildings, corner turrets, watch towers and a main tower are still visible.

== History ==
=== Foundation ===
There is no documentary evidence for the initial construction of this fortress. Around 1000 in France, fortified houses evolved from simple towers encircled by wooden palisades (castral mounds), into the more resistant masonry structures (castles).

Durfort is built on a rocky site overlooking the gorges of the Orbieu, offering a good view of the valley. The first medieval forts were initially places for surveillance and residences for small garrisons of the local lords, ensuring the control of agricultural valleys and trade routes which they dominated. Durfort is located on a peak, surrounded on three sides by a loop of the Orbieu river, providing a good defensive position.

The earliest written references mentioning the castle date from the 11th century. In 1093, it was mentioned in a transaction between the son of the lord of Durfort, Bertrand, and the Abbey of Lagrasse. In 1124, Guillaume and Raymond, lords of Durfort, paid homage to Viscount Bernard Aton of Carcassonne, and in 1163, the lord of Terme paid homage to Viscount Raymond de Trencavel, for the castle of Durfort.

=== Fortified residence in the Cathar country ===
The Cathar castles are a recent description originating in the contemporary tourism trade. This entirely arbitrary term indicates the fortresses built in the 13th century by the King of France after the crusade against the Albigensians. In the case of Durfort, the castral type of village habitat predates even the Cathar heresy. Nevertheless, the ruins which remain today are more recent.

The Cathar doctrines originated in Bulgaria at the end of the 10th century. Cathar communities spread across Europe around 1000. Catharism reached the south of France in the 12th century. Albi being one of its most durable centres of establishment, the term Albigensian indicates in this context the Cathar. In the middle of the 12th century (1167) there were five Cathar Churches: Albi, Toulouse, Carcassonne, Agen (Aragnensis) and Épernon in France. It was only in the 13th century, in 1226, that the bishopric of Razès, the area of Limoux, was created.

Faced with a challenge to the Roman Catholic Church and the supremacy of the Pope, the Roman church responded with preaching and excommunication for heresy. The failure of this attempt led Pope Innocent III in 1209 to launch a crusade against the “Albigensians”, the first crusade on the territory of Western Christendom.

In 1209, the lord of Durfort sided with the Cathars through his alliance with Olivier de Termes (see Château de Termes). Simon de Montfort took command of the Crusade against the Albigensians and campaigned in the area. In 1215, the château de Durfort became the property of Alain de Roucy, one of his lieutenants.

The population of the region, nevertheless, remained Cathar at heart, and as peace returned to the region, the Cathar movement reformed. In 1225, the neighbouring village of Pieusse hosted a Cathar council whose goal was to reorganize the Cathar community of Razès. Benoît de Termes became its spiritual leader. In 1226, the “War of Limoux" started, during which Cathar and Louis VIII's troops clashed.

The royal power confirmed its conquest of the region by building five large fortresses and a network of watch towers. The Château de Durfort was written into this defensive system, aimed at protecting the new frontiers of the Kingdom of France. 3 km away, closest fortress at Termes was remodelled in 1299 to become a royal castle with a garrison.

In 1241, Olivier de Termes submitted to Louis IX, and thus recovered a portion of his lands and castles, including Durfort. He seems to have given them to the former lords of Durfort. In 1243, Hugues de Durfort swore allegiance to the king, and, the following year, took part with the Crusaders in the siege of Montségur.

In 1256, Gaucelin de Durfort joined with other lords against the authority of the king of France and so lost rights to his land, recovering them some months later after paying homage to the king.

=== 17th century to today ===
In 1659, Louis XIV signed the Treaty of the Pyrenees with the Kingdom of Spain, sealed by his marriage to the Infanta Maria Theresa. This treaty altered the borders, giving Roussillon to France. The frontier advanced to the crests of the Pyrenees and the various fortresses of the region lost their strategic importance. The Château de Durfort was, therefore, altered to make it more comfortable.

In the 18th century, the castle seems to have been abandoned but its isolated position served to preserve its ruins. Today, the castle is private property; it may be visited free of charge with prior authorisation from the owners. The building is not preserved or maintained; there is a risk of falling stones.

== See also ==
- List of castles in France
- Cathar castles
- Catharism
- Albigensian Crusade

== Bibliography ==
- Jean-Philippe Vidal Les 36 cités et citadelles du Pays Cathare. ISBN 2-7191-0751-4.
- Roquebert, Michel (2005). Simon de Montfort: bourreau et martyr. Paris: Perrin. ISBN 978-2-262-02287-7.
