= Châteaux de Lastours =

Four associated castles in Occitania, France

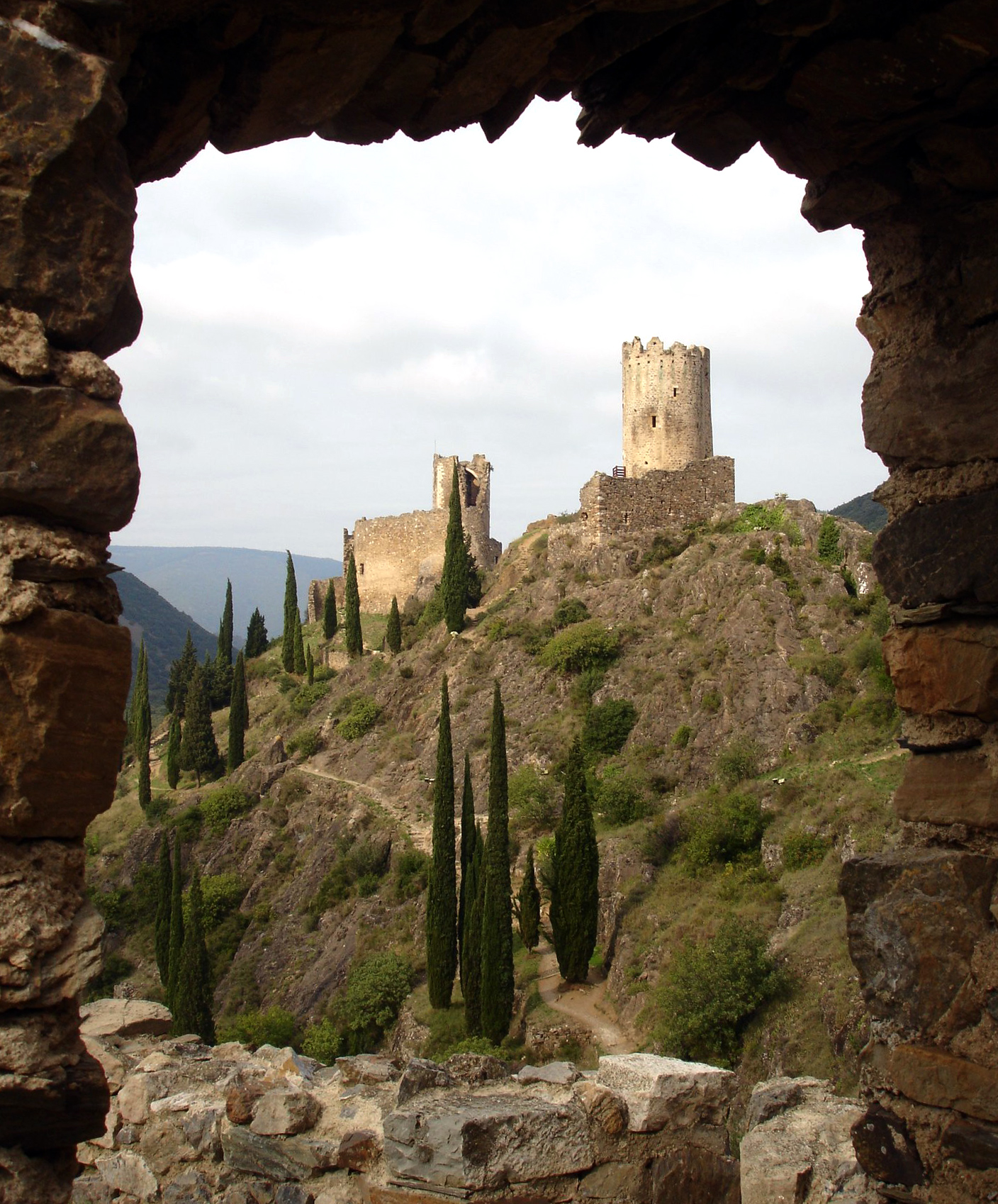
Châteaux de Lastours from a rampart of the château de Querthineux

The Châteaux de Lastours (in Occitan Lastors) are four so-called Cathar castles in the French commune of Lastours in the département of l'Aude. The four castles are on a rocky spur above the village of Lastours, isolated by the deep valleys of the Orbeil and Grésilhou rivers. They were built at an altitude of 300 m along a rock wall just 1,300 ft (400 m) long by 165 ft (50 m) wide. Cabaret, Surdespine and la Tour Régine stand in line, while Quertinheux is built on a separate pinnacle close by. The site has been classified monument historique (historic monument) by the French Ministry of Culture since 1905 and archaeological digs are still in progress. In July 2026, the Royal Capetian Fortresses of Languedoc (including these castles) were designated by UNESCO as a World Heritage Site.

These four castles constitute a single entity, even though they are not a single structure. The natural layout of the site permitted the economy of a fortress of great height. Plans were adapted to the rocks on which they were built. The construction of each is different reflecting the range of alterations made to the castles.

== History ==
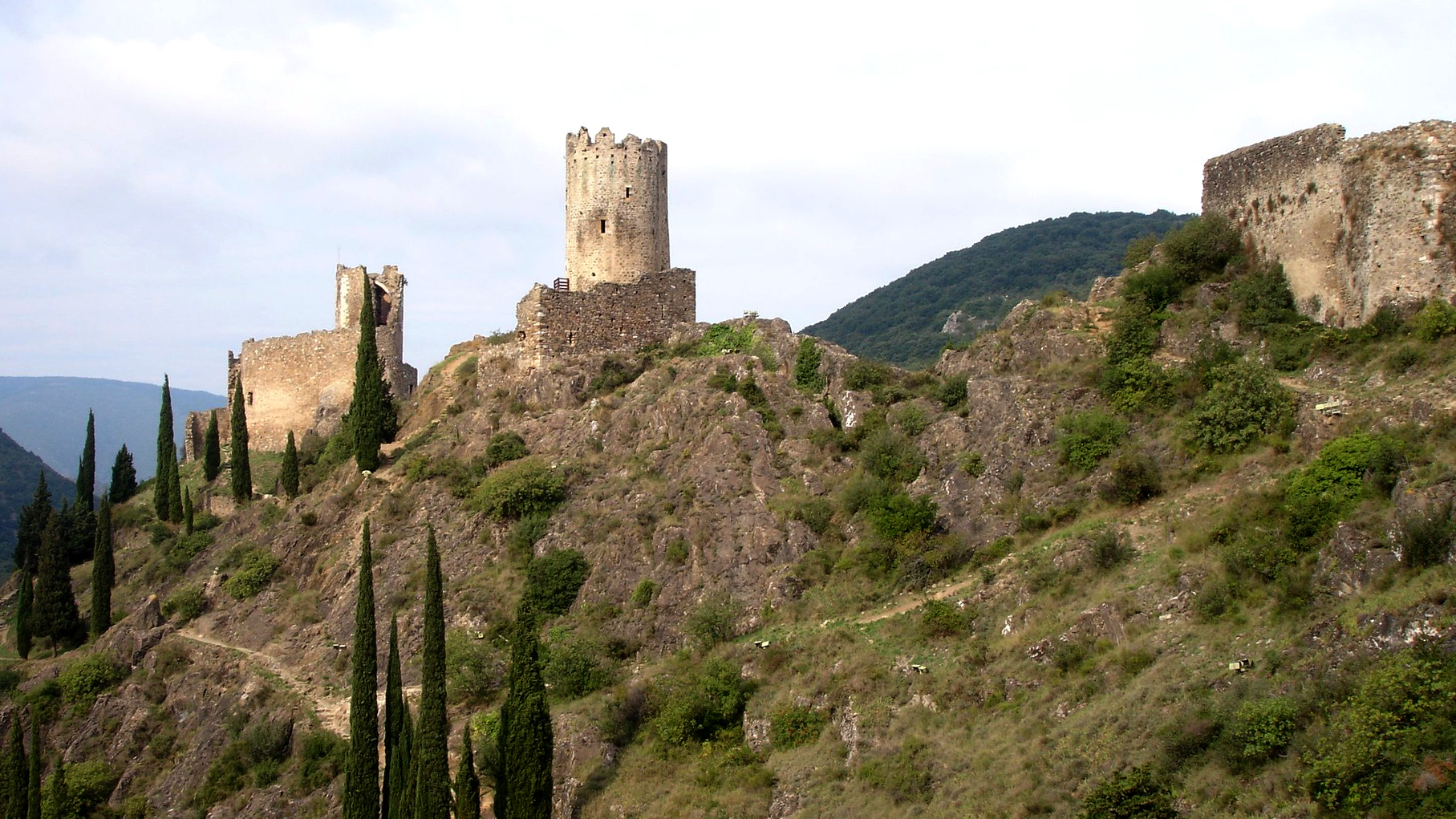
Cabaret, Tour Régine and Surdespine on the crest

In the Middle Ages, the site belonged to the lords of Cabaret, mentioned for the first time in 1067. Their wealth came mainly from the exploitation of iron mines. Probably only three castles were built in the 11th century and their sites evolved over the years following demolition and successive rebuilding. During this period, there were at least 22 lords of Cabaret.

The castles existed through the Albigensian Crusade. The lords of Cabaret were closely linked to the followers of Catharism and the villages surrounding the castles welcomed many Cathars. The fortress at this time belonged to Pierre-Roger de Cabaret follower of Raymond Roger Trencavel, who fought at his side during the defence of Carcassonne. In 1209, the site resisted the attacks of Simon de Montfort, 5th Earl of Leicester. But the crusader Bouchard de Marly, then lord of the Château de Saissac, was taken prisoner by Pierre-Roger. His freedom was negotiated against the surrender of Cabaret in 1211.

In 1223, the lords of Cabaret repossessed their lands and Cabaret became the seat of the Cathar bishop of Carcassès. Pierre-Roger resisted Simon de Montfort's attacks for many years, but in 1227, the castles were again besieged by Humbert de Beaujeu. In 1229, Cabaret capitulated.

The villages and the castles were plundered and then rebuilt to become royal fortresses. The Tour Régine was built by order of the king to affirm his supremacy. They became the administrative and military centre of six communities forming the châtellerie of Cabardès. In the 16th century, the castles were occupied by Protestants. They were dislodged by maréchal de Joyeuse in 1591.

== Organisation in the 11th century ==
Before the Crusade against the Albigensians, there were only three castles and they were not arranged on the crest. The surrounding villages were similar: houses, forges and cisterns around a high, narrow keep. Traces of the villages can be found on the west flank of the hill arranged in a semicircle following the contours around the manor house.

In the 13th century, the king decided on the destruction of the three towers and their houses so as to eliminate all refuges for the Cathars. The castles, however, were rebuilt on the crest so as to make them less accessible to enemy fire.

== Catharism at Cabaret ==
The castles at Lastours were a centre of Cathar religious activity during the 13th century. The castle village sheltered numerous 'Perfects' homes and the Cathar bishops went to stay in Cabaret: Arnaud Hot, Pierre Isarn and Guiraud Abith. In 1229, the fortress launched the Cathar resistance in the Languedoc. This period was called the Guerre de Cabaret (War of Cabaret).

The Lastours castles held out as a centre of opposition to the conquests of Simon de Montfort, who determined to wipe them out. In this, he was bound to fail, having to launch simultaneous attacks on three castles protected by sheer rockfaces and defended by a nobleman who, though not a Cathar, was aware of the importance of the campaign de Montfort was waging against his suzerain, the viscount of Carcassonne. De Montfort decided against attacking the castles and instead resorted to a cruel ploy that typifies the barbarity of this war. He brought prisoners from the village of Bram and had their eyes gouged out and their ears, noses and lips cut off. One prisoner, left with a single good eye, led them to Lastours as a warning. The ploy failed; the castles put up more resistance and held out until the supposedly impregnable fortress at Termes fell in November 1210. The lord of Cabaret then surrendered.

== Present description ==
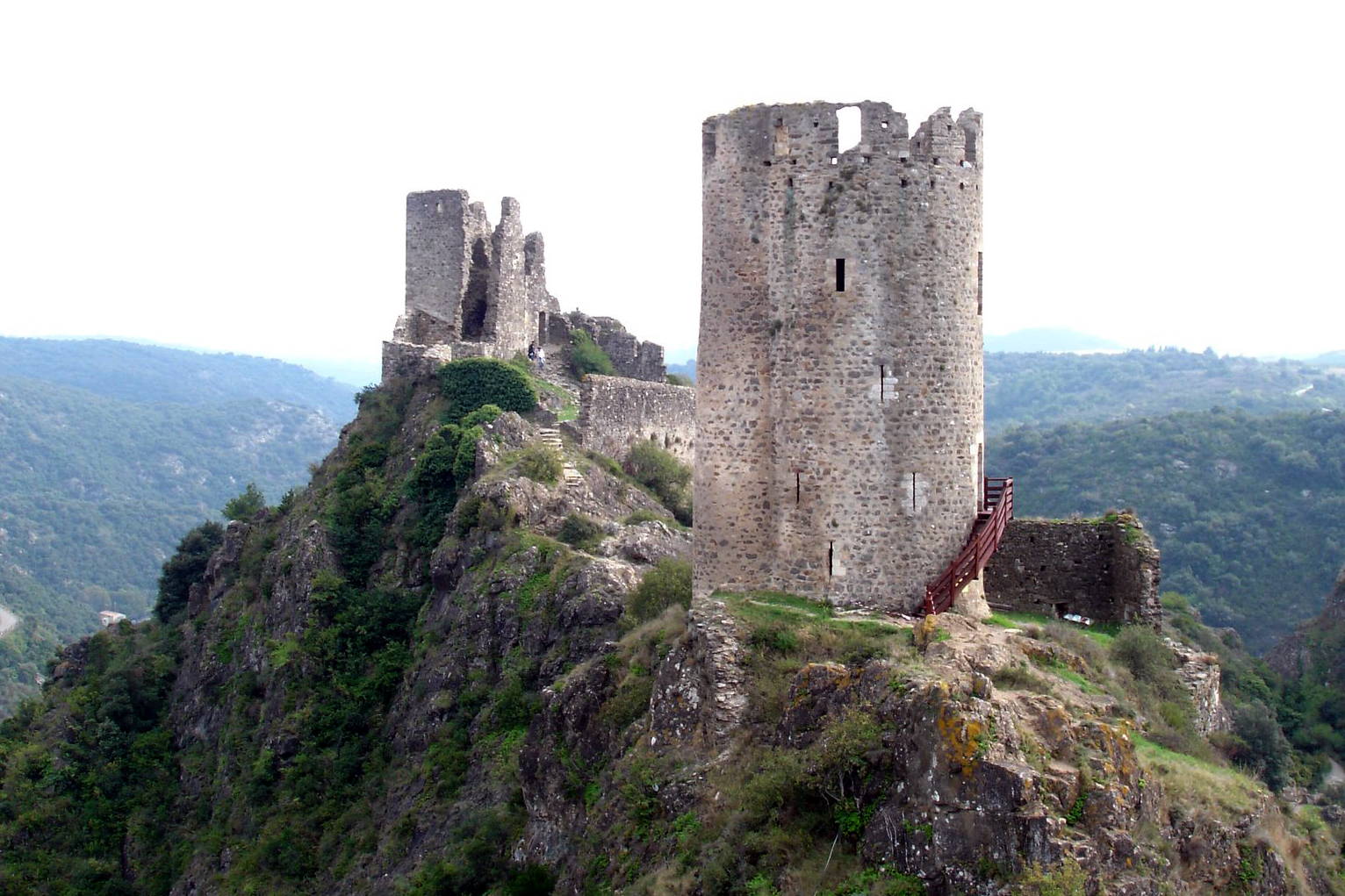
La Tour Régine, Surdespine and Quertinheux seen from Cabaret

The four castles are on the top of a crest on a north–south axis: Cabaret, Tour Régine, Surdespine and Querthineux. They controlled the principal access routes into the Cabardès and the Montagne Noire regions.

Cabaret 43°20′16″N 2°22′39.5″E

Cabaret castle is the main citadel with a barbican defence system. It consists of a north tower, a polygonal keep in the south and a group of residential buildings in the centre. The whole is surrounded by ramparts with a round walk. The crenellated wall is built with irregular material, with large stones forming the corners and openings.

Tour Régine 43°20′13.2″N 2°22′40.2″E

The Tour Régine, closest to Cabaret, (Régine Tower) is the most recent fortress and the smallest. It consists of a round tower, surrounded by a small curtain wall which has collapsed. Below ground, the tower contains the largest cistern of the four castles. The tower has three storeys and is flanked by a spiral staircase. The white limestone used is identical to that at Cabaret. It is thought that this tower was built after the Albigensian Crusade: the name (Régine = Royal) suggests as much and there is no written evidence of its existence prior to 1260.

Surdespine 43°20′11″N 2°22′42″E

Also called Fleur-Espine (Thornflower), this castle is the least preserved of the four. On the highest part of the site, it consists of a square tower, a house and a cistern. A rectangular curtain wall gives protection. It is noted for the rarity of its murder holes and its four semicircular arched windows.

Quertinheux 43°20′7.8″N 2°22′38.5″E

The Quertinheux castle is furthest south along the crest on an isolated rocky outcrop. It consists of a circular tower and a polygonal curtain wall. A chicane defends the entrance. It overlooks the remains of a destroyed Romanesque church.

== See also ==
- Cathar castles
- List of castles in France
