= Rouvenac =

Part of Val-du-Faby in Occitanie, France

- Part of Val-du-Faby
- Coat of arms
- Location of Rouvenac
- Location within France Location within Occitanie
- Coordinates: 42°56′20″N 2°08′47″E
- Country: France
- Region: Occitania
- Department: Aude
- Arrondissement: Limoux
- Canton: La Haute-Vallée de l'Aude
- Commune: Val-du-Faby
- Area^{1}: 12.23 km^{2} (4.72 sq mi)
- Elevation: 300 m (980 ft)
- Highest elevation: 587 m (1,926 ft)
- Lowest elevation: 279 m (915 ft)
- Population (2021): 226
  - Density: 18.5/km^{2} (47.9/sq mi)
- Time zone: UTC+01:00 (CET)
  - Summer (DST): UTC+02:00 (CEST)
- Postal code: 11260
- ^{1} French Land Register data, which excludes lakes, ponds, glaciers > 1 km^{2} (0.386 sq mi or 247 acres) and river estuaries.

Rouvenac (French pronunciation: [ʁuvnak]; Languedocien: Rovenac) is a former commune in the Aude department in southern France. On 1 January 2019, it was merged into the new commune Val-du-Faby.

== Population ==
Historical population
Year	Pop.	±% p.a.
2006	189	—
2011	212	+2.32%
2015	218	+0.70%
2021	226	+0.60%
Source: INSEE

== See also ==
- Communes of the Aude department
