= Olivier de Termes =

Olivier de Termes (1200 – 12 August 1274) was a knight from the southern French region of Termes, Aude. He was raised as a Cathar but eventually converted to Catholicism in a move that would help restore peace to his homeland following the ravages of the Albigensian Crusade.

== Early life ==
Olivier was the son of Raymond de Termes, count of the Termes region of the Carcassonne district, then lying on the border between Languedoc and Catalonia. The region was overwhelmingly Cathar in religion, and Oliver's father was besieged by Simon de Montfort in his castle at Chateau de Termes in 1210. Having survived the fall of the castle, Oliver made his way south with other refugees from the crusade to the court of Aragon, where he befriended the future King James I of Aragon. He was also companions in youth with Raymond II Trencavel of Albi, and Raymond VII of Toulouse.

== Military career ==
Oliver fought first against the knights who had conquered his country during the crusade against the Cathars, then in about 1245 he made peace with Louis IX of France, agreeing to go on crusade. He spent much of the remainder of his life assisting in military operations in the Holy Land (participating in both the Seventh Crusade and Eighth Crusade), advising the king, and helping pacify Languedoc.

== See also ==
- Cathars
- Chateau de Termes
