= Cathar castles =

Medieval castles in Languedoc, France

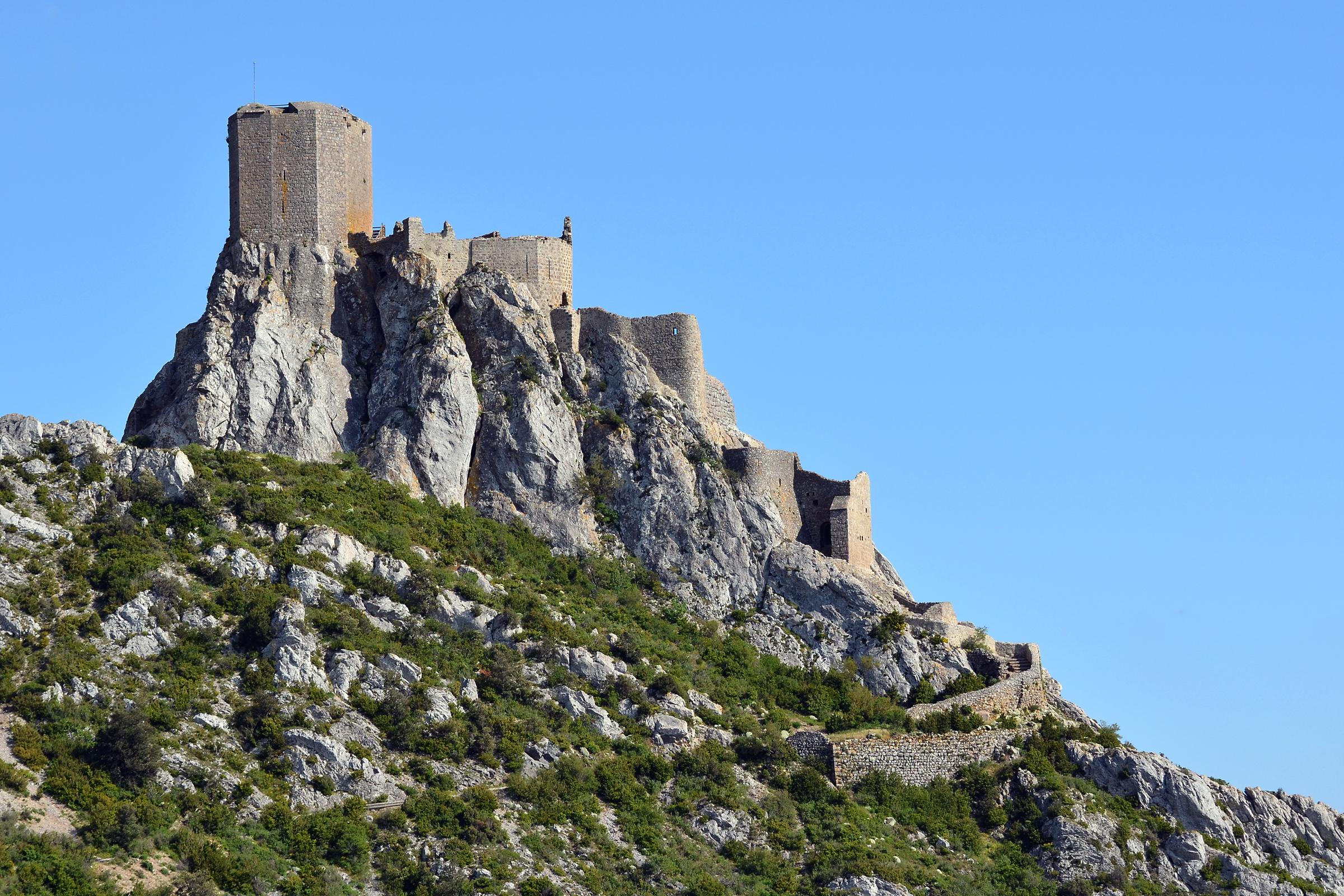
Le Château de Quéribus

Cathar castles (in French Châteaux cathares) are a group of medieval castles located in the Languedoc region. Some had a Cathar connection in that they offered refuge to dispossessed Cathars in the thirteenth century. In July 2026, UNESCO designated them as a World Heritage Site under the name Royal Capetian Fortresses of Languedoc.

Many of these sites were replaced by new castles built by the victorious French Crusaders and the term Cathar castle is also applied to these fortifications despite their having no connection with Cathars. The fate of many Cathar castles, at least for the early part of the Crusade, is outlined in the contemporary Occitan "Chanson de la Croisade", translated into English as the "Song of the Cathar Wars (the crusade)".

== True "Cathar castles" ==
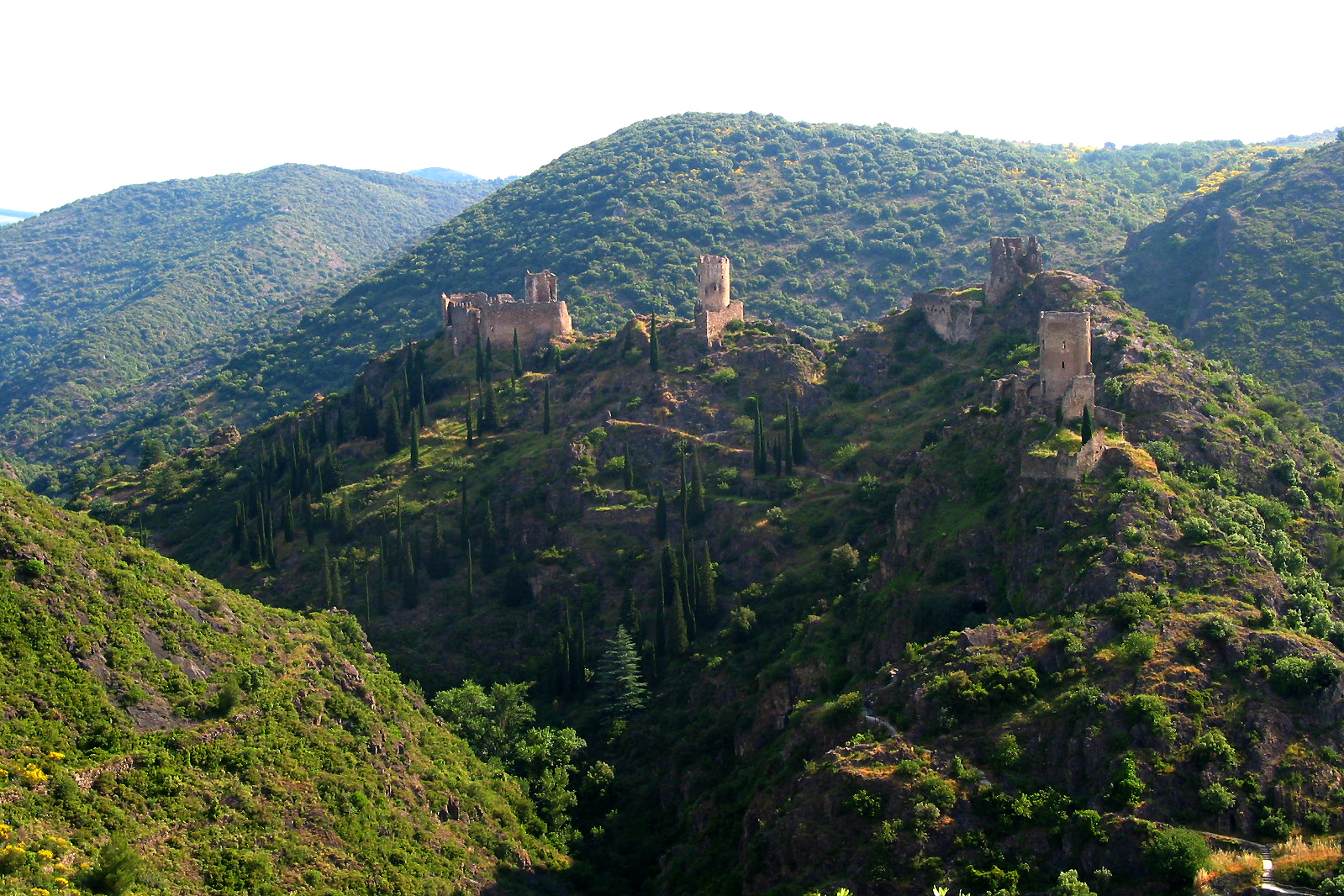
Lastours castles (13th-century)

Cathar strong points were generally surrounded by a walled settlement -- ranging from a small village to a sizable city -- known as a castrum. In relatively flat areas such as the Lauragais Plain, castles and castra were often located on nearby hills, for example Laurac, Fanjeaux, Mas-Saintes-Puelles, and Carcassonne. In more rugged areas castles and castra were typically located on mountain tops as at Lastours-Cabaret, Montségur, Termes and Puilaurens.

When they were taken by the Catholic Crusaders they were generally offered to senior Crusade commanders who would replace the local lord as master of the castle and the surrounding area. The old lords, sometimes Cathar sympathisers, were dispossessed and often became refugees or guerrilla resistance fighters known as faidits, an Occitan word meaning 'banished' or 'proscribed'.

The new French lords generally built themselves a new state-of-the-art castle, sometimes on the site of the old "Cathar castle", sometimes next to it, as at Puivert. In some places, notably Carcassonne and Foix, substantial parts of the existing castles date from the Cathar period.

== Royal citadels ==
Following the failure of the attempt to recapture Carcassonne by its Viscount, Raymond II Trencaval, in 1240, the Cité de Carcassonne was reinforced by the French king, new master of the viscountcy. Carcassonne was heavily garrisoned not only against Cathar sympathizer insurgents, but also the Catalans and Aragonese, as the Trencavels had been vassals of the King of Aragon, who was the direct descendant of Sunifred and Bello of Carcassonne.

The King of France took as frontier fortresses Cathar castles near the border between the historic Trencavel territories and the Roussillon, which still belonged to the King of Aragon. Five of these became Royal citadels, garrisoned by a small troop of French royal troops. These five Cathar Castles are known as the cinq fils de Carcassonne, the Five Sons of Carcassonne:

- Château d'Aguilar
- Château de Peyrepertuse
- Château de Puilaurens
- Château de Quéribus
- Château de Termes

== Abandonment of the Five Sons of Carcassonne ==
In 1659, Louis XIV and the Philip IV of Spain signed the Treaty of the Pyrenees, sealing the marriage of the Infanta Marie Therese to the French King. The treaty modified the frontiers, giving Roussillon to France as part of the dowry, and moving the international frontier south to the crest of the Pyrenees, the present Franco-Spanish border. The Five Sons of Carcassonne thus lost their importance. Some maintained a garrison for a while, a few until the French Revolution, but they fell into decay, often becoming shelters for shepherds or bandits.

== Other "Cathar castles" ==
Map of Cathar castles

- Château d’Arques
- Château de Durfort
- Châteaux de Lastours
- Château de Montségur
- Château de Padern
- Château de Pieusse
- Château de Puivert
- Rennes-le-Château
- Château de Roquefixade
- Château de Saissac
- Château d'Usson

== See also ==
- List of castles in France
- Catharism
