= Val-du-Faby =

Commune in Occitanie, France

- Commune
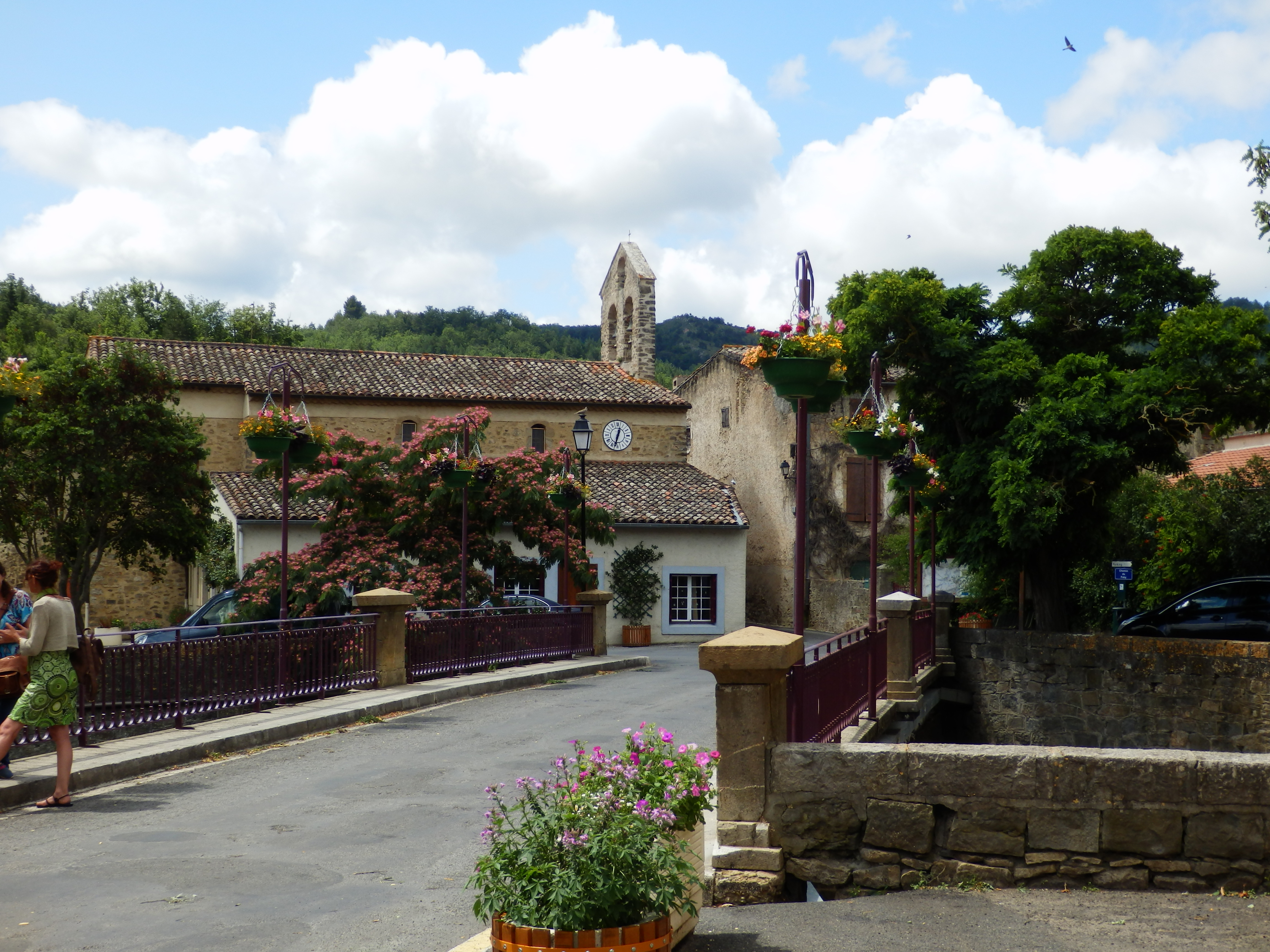
- The church and surroundings in Fa
- Location of Val-du-Faby
- Location within France Location within Occitanie
- Coordinates: 42°56′21″N 2°11′35″E
- Country: France
- Region: Occitania
- Department: Aude
- Arrondissement: Limoux
- Canton: La Haute-Vallée de l'Aude
- Intercommunality: Pyrénées Audoises

Government
  - Mayor (2020–2026): Anthony Chanaud
- Area^{1}: 23.71 km^{2} (9.15 sq mi)
- Highest elevation: 587 m (1,926 ft)
- Lowest elevation: 253 m (830 ft)
- Population (2023): 580
  - Density: 24/km^{2} (63/sq mi)
- Time zone: UTC+01:00 (CET)
  - Summer (DST): UTC+02:00 (CEST)
- INSEE/Postal code: 11131 /11260
- ^{1} French Land Register data, which excludes lakes, ponds, glaciers > 1 km^{2} (0.386 sq mi or 247 acres) and river estuaries.

Val-du-Faby (French pronunciation: [val dy fabi]; Occitan: Fan e Rovenac) is a commune in the Aude department in southern France. The municipality was established on 1 January 2019 by merger of the former communes of Fa and Rouvenac.

== See also ==
- Communes of the Aude department
