= Château d'Arques =

14th-century castle in Arques in the Aude département of France

Coordinates: 42°57′11″N 2°22′01″E

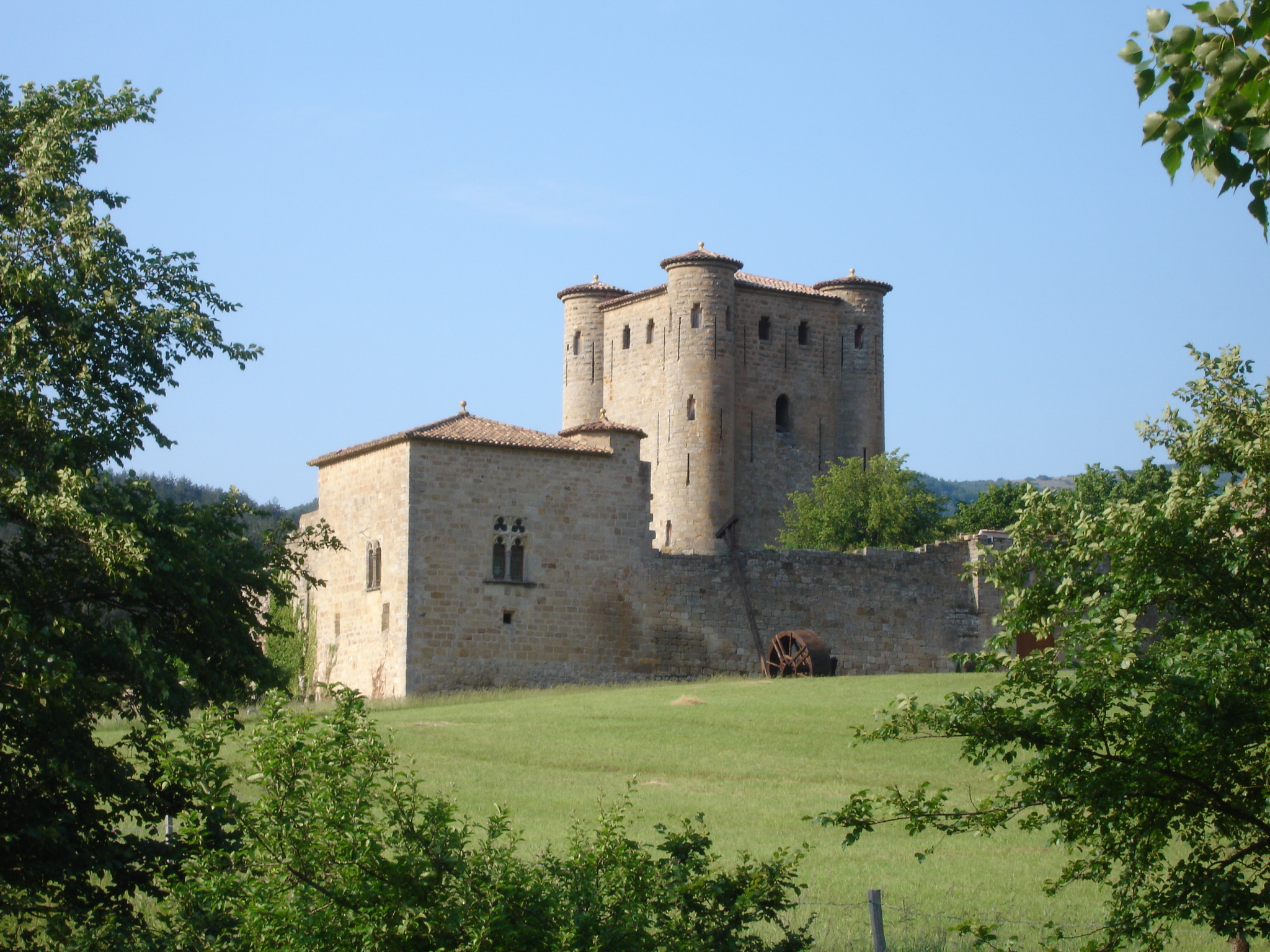

The Château d'Arques (Languedocien: Castèl d’Arcas) is a ruined 14th-century castle in the commune of Arques in the Aude département of France. It is one of the so-called Cathar castles.

== History ==
In the 12th century, there was a conflict between the viscount of Carcassonne and several seigneurs, including Arques and Lagrasse. The estates at Arques became the property of the seigneurs of Termes.

In 1217, Béranger d'Arques was one of the associates of Guillaume de Peyrepertuse.

In 1210, after the defeat of the Château de Termes during the Albigensian Crusade, Simon de Montfort, 5th Earl of Leicester, attacked Arques. After having burned the village (Villa de Arquis), situated on the banks of the Rialsès, he gave this part of Razès to one of his lieutenants, Pierre de Voisins.

In 1284, Gilles de Voisins began work on building a castle, with the intention of defending the Rialsès valley and controlling the transhumance routes leading to the Corbières Massif.

In 1316, Gilles II de Voisins, known as "Gilet", altered and completed the castle.

In 1518, Françoise de Voisins, the last of the Voisins, married Jean de Joyeuse who took the barony of Arques. The castle was abandoned in favour of Couiza.

In 1575, the castle was besieged by Protestants and only the keep managed to resist the assault.

By the start of the French Revolution the castle had fallen into ruin. It was sold as a national asset and subsequently suffered severe damage.

== Architecture ==
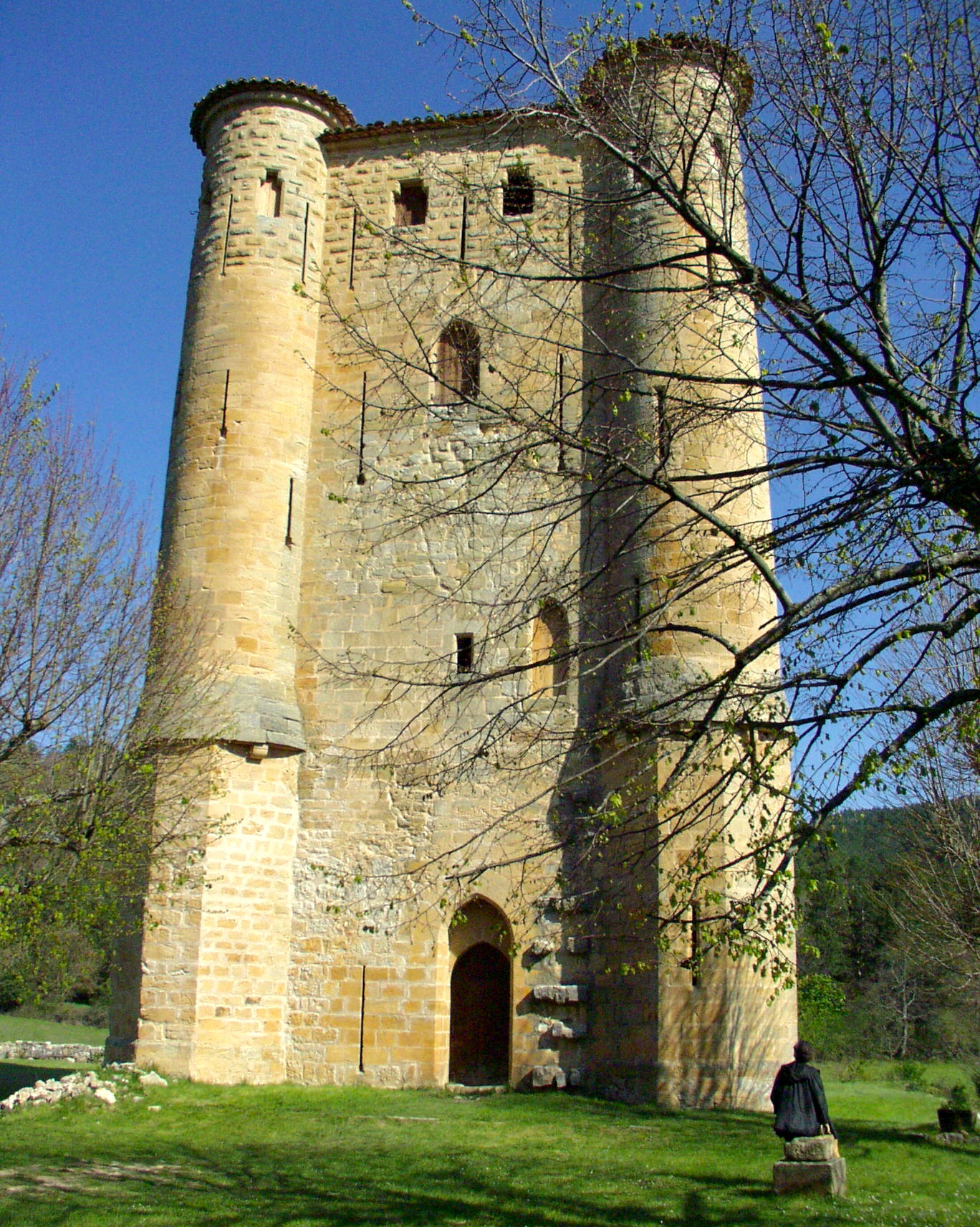
The keep

The castle consists of an enceinte and a high square keep with four turrets. It was built after Albigensian Crusade of the 13th century on lands given to Pierre de Voisins, one of Simon de Montfort's lieutenants.

The almost square enceinte (51m by 55m) encircles the castle with a gateway furnished with machicolation and surmounted with a keystone bearing the arms of the Voisin family ("De gueules à trois fusées d'or en fasce, accompagnées en chef d'un lambel à quatre pendant de même"). Numerous buildings must have existed the length of the enceinte. Two well-preserved residential towers remain.

The square keep, 25 m high, is a work of military architecture inspired by castles in the Ile de France. It has four levels served by a spiral staircase. The various rooms were constructed with extreme care. The top floor was given over to defence of the castle. Forty soldiers could defend it thanks to numerous murder holes and rectangular bays set symmetrically into the walls.

It is a good example of the progress in military construction in a strategically important region.

== Today ==
The castle is owned partly by the commune and partly privately. It has been listed since 1887 as a monument historique by the French Ministry of Culture. It has been renovated and, in part, reconstructed. It is open to visitors.

== See also ==
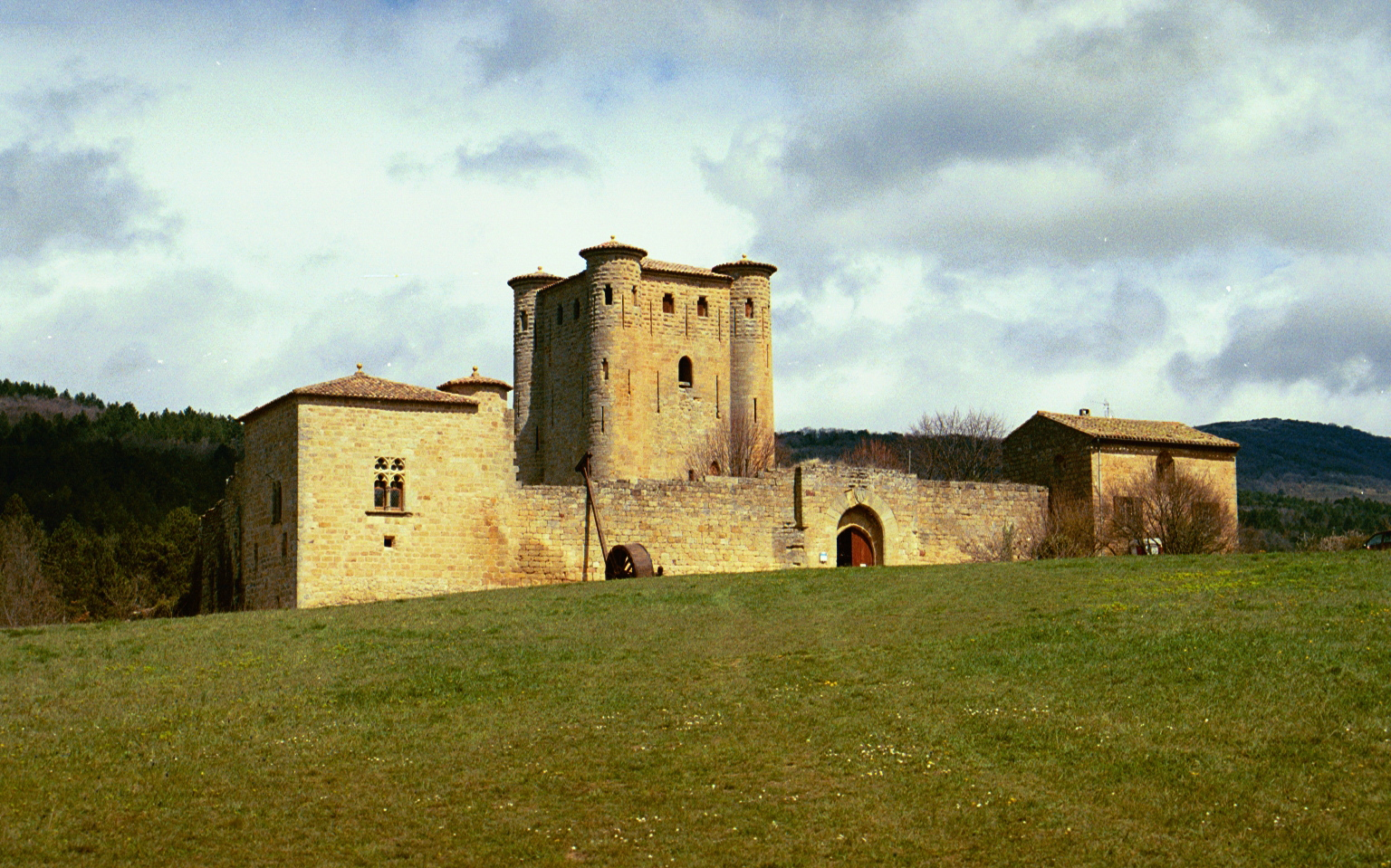
Château d'Arques

- List of castles in France
- Cathar castles
- Pays Cathare
- Catharism

== Bibliography ==
- Henri-Paul Eydoux, "'Châteaux des pays de l'Aude", Congrès archéologique de France. 131^{e} session. Pays de l'Aude. 1973, Société Française d'Archéologie, Paris, 1973, pp. 208–212
- Lucien Bayrou, Le château d'Arques : guide du visiteur, Centre d'archéologie médiévale du Languedoc, Carcassonne, 1989
- Lucien Bély, Connaître les Cathares, Éditions Sud-Ouest, Luçon, 2006, p. 73
