= Château de Roquefixade =

Ruined castle in Ariège, France

Coordinates: 42°56′20″N 1°45′12″E

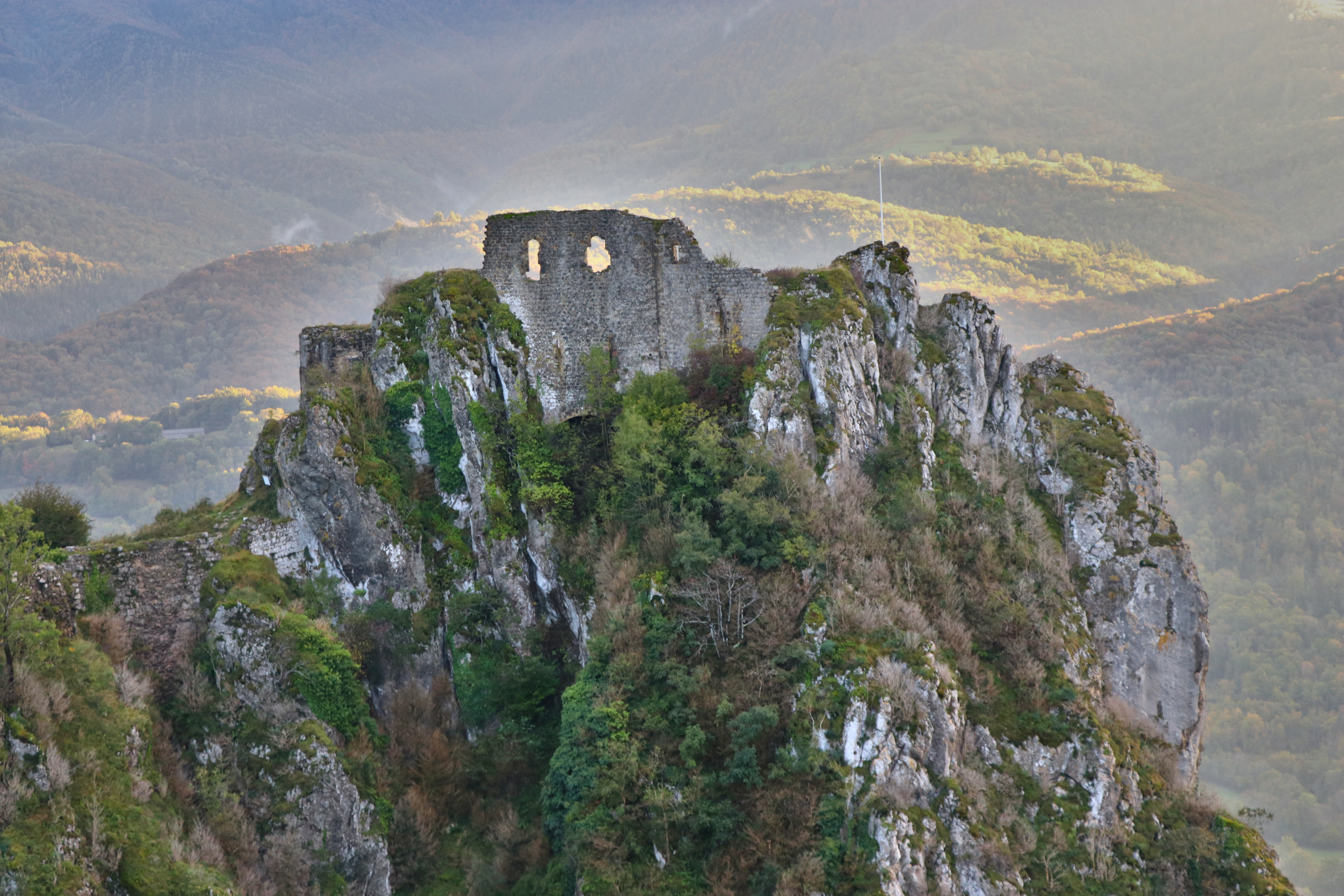
The ruined wall of Château de Roquefixade

The Château de Roquefixade is a ruined castle built on a cliff overlooking the village of Roquefixade, situated 8 km (5 miles) west of Lavelanet French département of Ariège.

There are records of a castle on the site going back to 1180, though the present ruins are more modern. While marketed in the tourist industry as one of the so-called Cathar castles, the ruins are later than this. Despite this, the site did provide a place of refuge for the Cathars at the time of the Albigensian Crusade.

A natural cleft in the cliff face has been filled in by an arch supported by ramparts. This cleft is the origin of the name of the village, and later the castle: roca fisada (fissured rock) in Catalan. The remains of the castle walls cling to the rock, originally circling an impressive keep built at the highest point of the site. The trek to Roquefixade Castle is marked and takes around 25 minutes beginning at Roquefixade village square.

At the end of the 13th century, Roquefixade became a stronghold at the end of a line of royal fortresses built along the Corbières hills, to keep watch on the territory of the Count of Foix. The keep was remodelled in the 14th century, and other alterations were made in the 15th and 16th centuries. The castle survived until 1632 when the French king Louis XIII rested in the area on his way to Toulouse for the execution of Henri II, Duke of Montmorency who had risen against Richelieu. Louis took the opportunity to order the destruction (slighting) of Roquefixade. Now, it serves no purpose and is costly to maintain.

Château de Roquefixade has been listed since 1995 as a monument historique by the French Ministry of Culture.

== See also ==
- Cathar castles
- List of castles in France
