= Fa, Aude =

Part of Val-du-Faby in Occitanie, France

Fa
- Part of Val-du-Faby
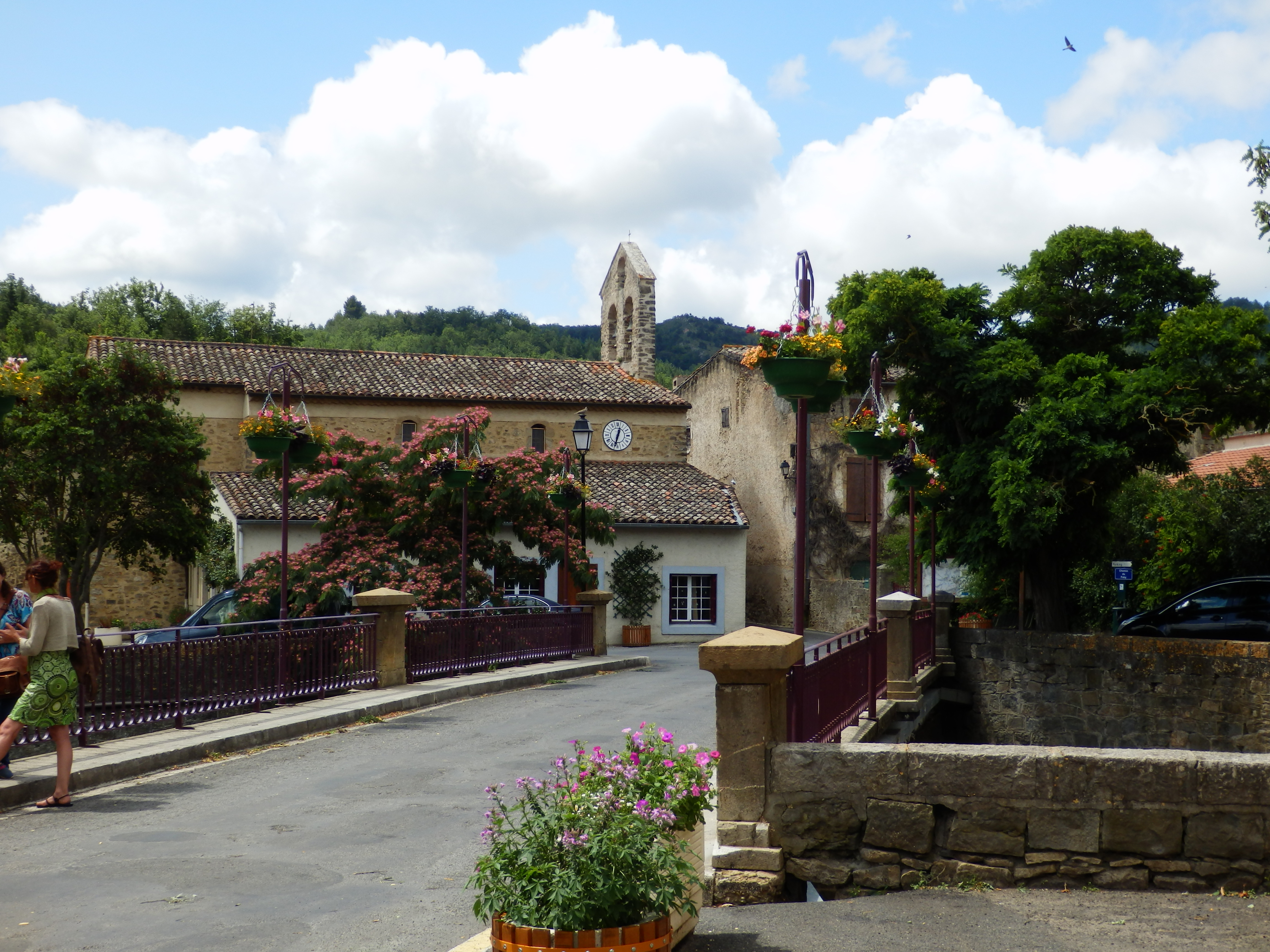

- Coat of arms
- Location of Fa
- Location within France Location within Occitanie
- Coordinates: 42°56′21″N 2°11′35″E
- Country: France
- Region: Occitania
- Department: Aude
- Arrondissement: Limoux
- Canton: La Haute-Vallée de l'Aude
- Intercommunality: Communauté de communes des Pyrénées Audoises
- Commune: Val-du-Faby
- Area^{1}: 11.48 km^{2} (4.43 sq mi)
- Elevation: 272 m (892 ft)
- Highest elevation: 580 m (1,900 ft)
- Lowest elevation: 253 m (830 ft)
- Population (2021): 356
  - Density: 31.0/km^{2} (80.3/sq mi)
- Time zone: UTC+01:00 (CET)
  - Summer (DST): UTC+02:00 (CEST)
- Postal code: 11260
- ^{1} French Land Register data, which excludes lakes, ponds, glaciers > 1 km^{2} (0.386 sq mi or 247 acres) and river estuaries.

Fa (French pronunciation: [fa]; Languedocien: Fan) is a former commune in the Aude department in southern France. On 1 January 2019, it was merged into the new commune Val-du-Faby.

The inhabitants call themselves Fabianais(es).

== Population ==
Historical population
Year	Pop.	±% p.a.
2006	313	—
2011	369	+3.35%
2015	351	−1.24%
2021	356	+0.24%
Source: INSEE

== See also ==
- Communes of the Aude department
