= Château d'Allègre (Gard) =

Castle in France

Coordinates: 44°11′44″N 4°16′01″E

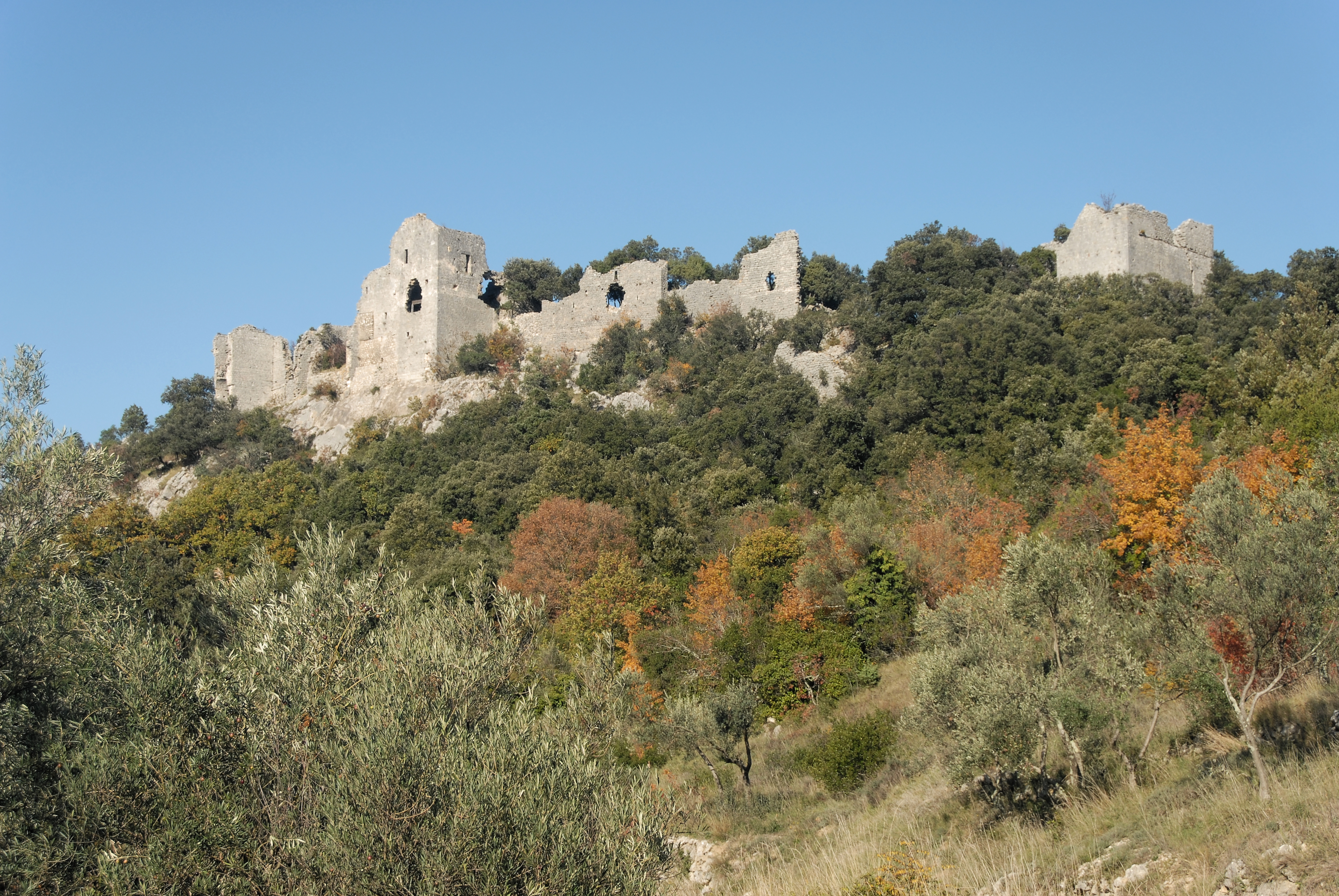

The Château d'Allègre is a ruined castle in the commune of Allègre-les-Fumades in the Gard département of France.

== History ==
The first mention of a castrum called Alegrio dates from 1136, when Bernard de Ferreyroles paid homage to Bernard Pelet, Baron of Alès. In 1211, a parchment of Philippe Auguste (Philip II of France) indicated that the castrum de Allegrio diocesis Uticensis belonged to several seigneurial families sharing the lands of Allègre under the sovereignty of the Bishop of Uzès.

It has been listed since 1997 as a monument historique by the French Ministry of Culture.

== See also ==
List of castles in France
