= Padern =

Commune in Occitanie, France

- Commune
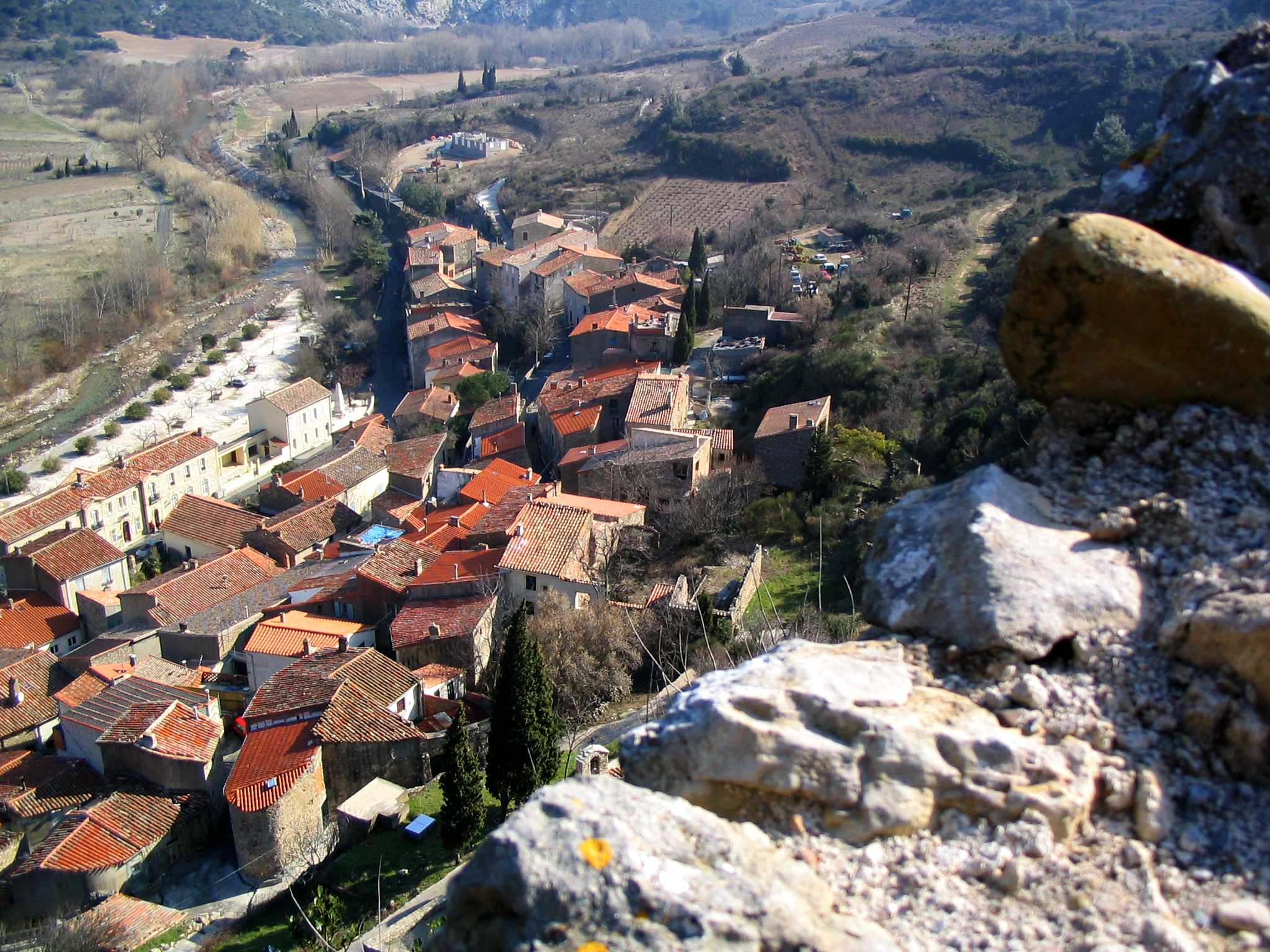
- A general view of Padern

- Coat of arms
- Location of Padern
- Location within France Location within Occitanie
- Coordinates: 42°52′07″N 2°39′27″E
- Country: France
- Region: Occitania
- Department: Aude
- Arrondissement: Narbonne
- Canton: Les Corbières
- Intercommunality: Corbières Salanque Méditerranée

Government
  - Mayor (2020–2026): Remy Bertrand
- Area^{1}: 29.79 km^{2} (11.50 sq mi)
- Elevation: 195 m (640 ft)
- Highest elevation: 920 m (3,020 ft)
- Lowest elevation: 148 m (486 ft)
- Population (2023): 139
  - Density: 4.67/km^{2} (12.1/sq mi)
- Time zone: UTC+01:00 (CET)
  - Summer (DST): UTC+02:00 (CEST)
- INSEE/Postal code: 11270 /11350
- ^{1} French Land Register data, which excludes lakes, ponds, glaciers > 1 km^{2} (0.386 sq mi or 247 acres) and river estuaries.

Padern (French pronunciation: [padɛʁn]; Languedocien: Padèrn) is a commune in the Aude department in southern France.

== Population ==
Historical population
Year	Pop.	±% p.a.
1968	283	—
1975	209	−4.24%
1982	168	−3.07%
1990	145	−1.82%
1999	140	−0.39%
2007	127	−1.21%
2012	127	+0.00%
2017	132	+0.78%
2023	139	+0.86%
Source: INSEE

== Monuments ==
- The Château de Padern is a ruined castle that stands on a hill overlooking the village.

== See also ==
- Corbières AOC
- Communes of the Aude department
