= Château de Saissac =

Ruined castle in France

Coordinates: 43°21′25″N 2°10′4.7″E

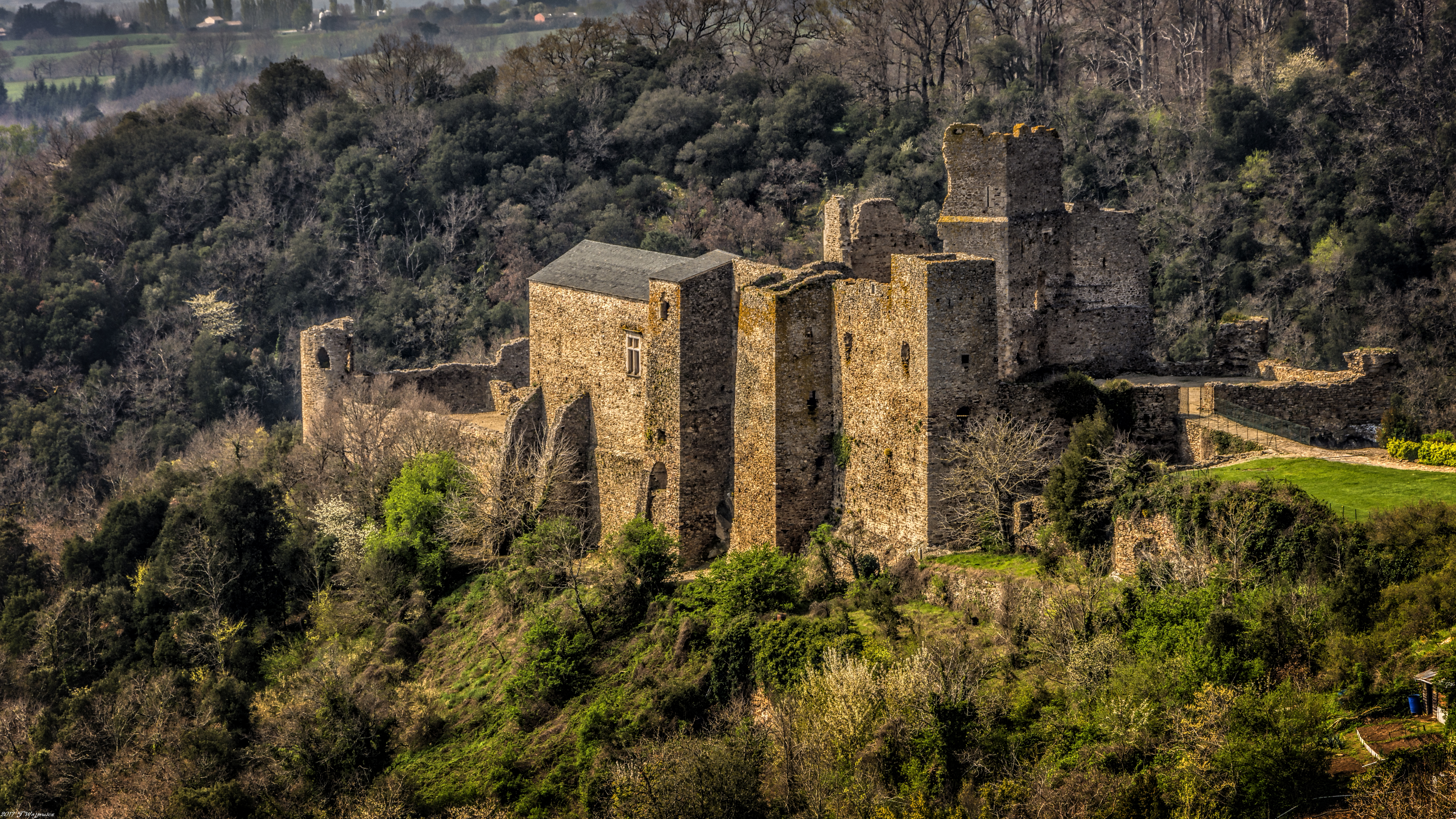
The Château de Saissac seen from an elevated vantage point

The Château de Saissac is a ruined castle, one of the so-called Cathar castles, in the southernmost tip of the commune of Saissac in the Aude département in the north-west of Carcassonne, France. It was once the residence of the powerful vassal family of Trencavel. Today the ruins are protected as official historical monuments of France (French: monument historique).

== History ==
The castle dominates the rocky headland and the ravine of Vernassonne, at an important strategic position at the entry of the Montagne noire. Based on historical texts, it can be dated to at least 960. It was bequeathed by the bishop of Toulouse to the Count of Carcassonne. In the 11th century, the castle was pledged to powerful vassals in the country. They formed a junior branch under the counts of Foix who formed at the time the lineage of Saissac. It is important all the same to note the presence of a castrum under the current caste, probably dating from the 11th century, though its origin can date to the time of the Visigoths.

At the time of the Albigensian Crusade in 1229, the lord of Saissac, Bertrand de Saissac, himself a Cathar, was the tutor of Raymond Roger de Trencavel. They were subjugated and stripped of their titles. Bouchard de Marly ordered the seizing of the castle and its goods; it was only later, after 1234, that the castle was restored by Lambert de Thursey, another companion of Montfort.

At the end of the 13th century, the castle became the inheritance of the family of Lévis, new lords of Mirepoix. From 1331 to 1412, it passed to the family of Isle-Jourdain. In the 15th century, the barony was held by the family of Caraman. The castle changed hands repeatedly until 1565, passing through the hands of Bernuy, a rich man, and house of Clermont-Lodève.

In 1568 and 1580, the Protestant troops destroyed the village but were unable to enter the impregnable fortress.

From 1715, the castle was held by the Luynes, who however did not reside in the castle.

After the French Revolution, the castle quickly fell in ruins, after repeatedly being looted by treasure hunters in 1862 lured by the castle's romantic aspect.

== Today ==
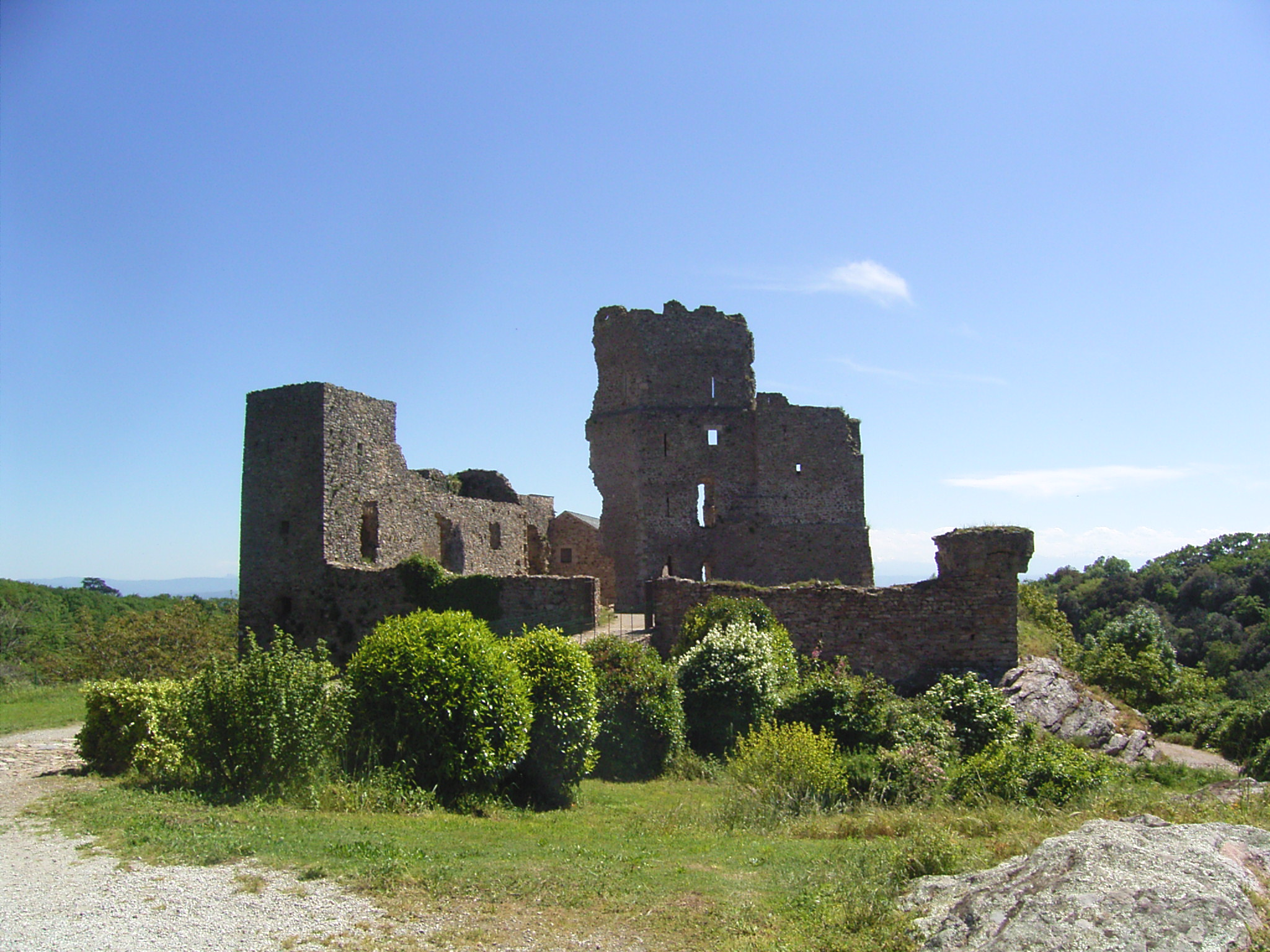
The Château de Saissac from the entrance

From 1995, the castle has been in the possession of the commune, which began a programme of restoration in order to make the castle available to visitors. In 2007, two rooms of the main building (the Aldonce residence, constructed in the 16th century) were rebuilt in the 16th century style, together with the framework resembling the hull of a ship. Many locked cellars under the keep have been made accessible.

== See also ==
- List of castles in France
- Cathar castles
