= Termes, Aude =

Commune in Occitanie, France

Termes
- Commune
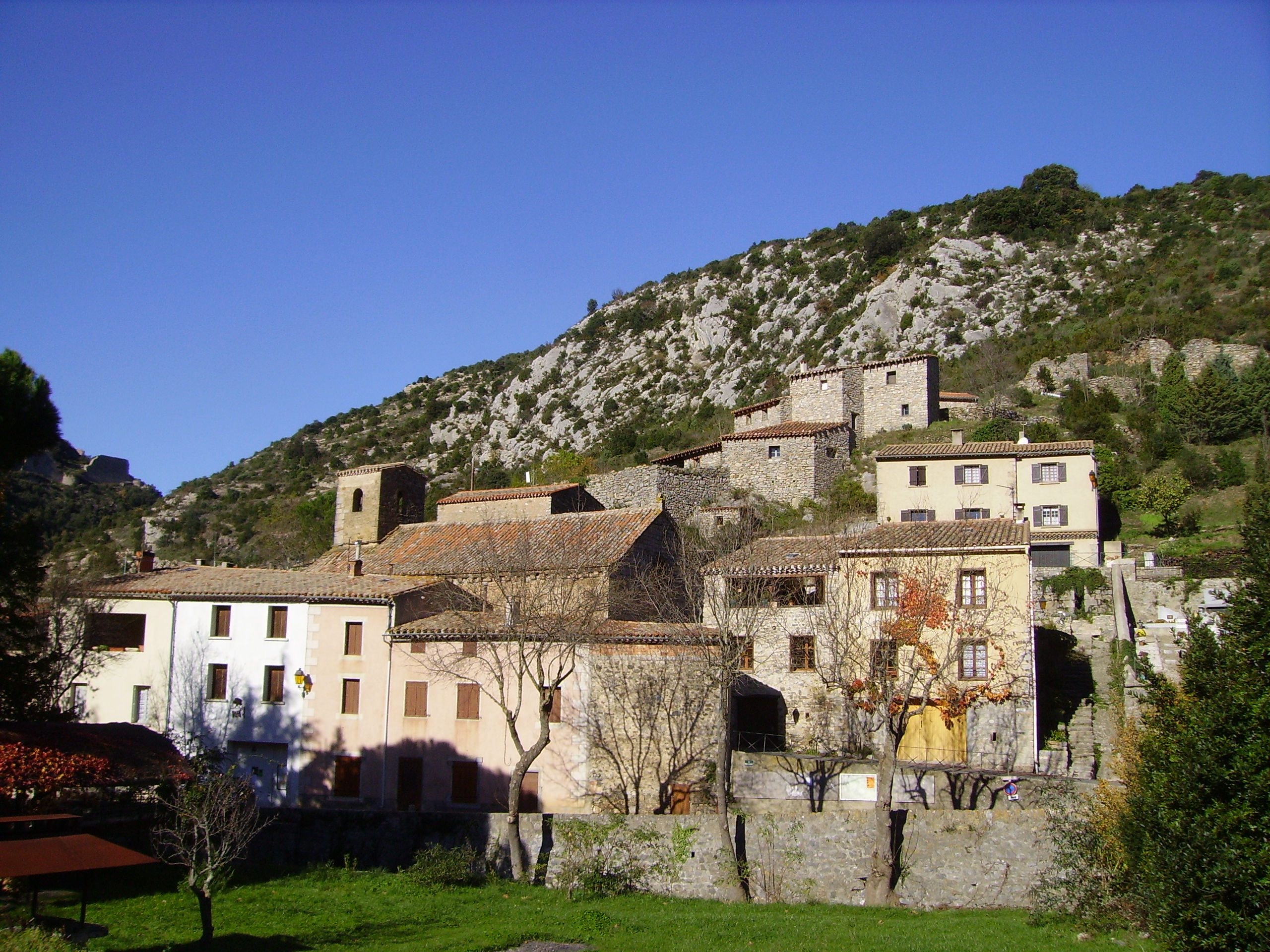
- A general view of Termes

- Coat of arms
- Location of Termes
- Location within France Location within Occitanie
- Coordinates: 43°00′05″N 2°33′47″E
- Country: France
- Region: Occitania
- Department: Aude
- Arrondissement: Narbonne
- Canton: Les Corbières

Government
  - Mayor (2020–2026): Hervé Baro
- Area^{1}: 18.63 km^{2} (7.19 sq mi)
- Elevation: 300 m (980 ft)
- Highest elevation: 680 m (2,230 ft)
- Lowest elevation: 200 m (660 ft)
- Population (2023): 48
  - Density: 2.6/km^{2} (6.7/sq mi)
- Time zone: UTC+01:00 (CET)
  - Summer (DST): UTC+02:00 (CEST)
- INSEE/Postal code: 11388 /11330
- ^{1} French Land Register data, which excludes lakes, ponds, glaciers > 1 km^{2} (0.386 sq mi or 247 acres) and river estuaries.

Termes (French pronunciation: [tɛʁm]; Languedocien: Tèrme) is a commune in the Aude department in southern France.

== Population ==
Historical population
Year	Pop.	±% p.a.
1968	53	—
1975	45	−2.31%
1982	50	+1.52%
1990	43	−1.87%
1999	54	+2.56%
2007	55	+0.23%
2012	44	−4.36%
2017	38	−2.89%
2023	48	+3.97%
Source: INSEE

== See also ==
- Corbières AOC
- Communes of the Aude department
