= Fenouillet =

Fenouillet is the name or part of the name of the following communes in France:

- Fenouillet, Haute-Garonne, in the Haute-Garonne department
- Fenouillet, Pyrénées-Orientales, in the Pyrénées-Orientales department
- Fenouillet-du-Razès, in the Aude department
- Saint-Paul-de-Fenouillet, in the Pyrénées-Orientales department
