= Peyrepertuse =

Ruined castle in France

Château de Peyrepertuse
- Duilhac-sous-Peyrepertuse, Aude, France
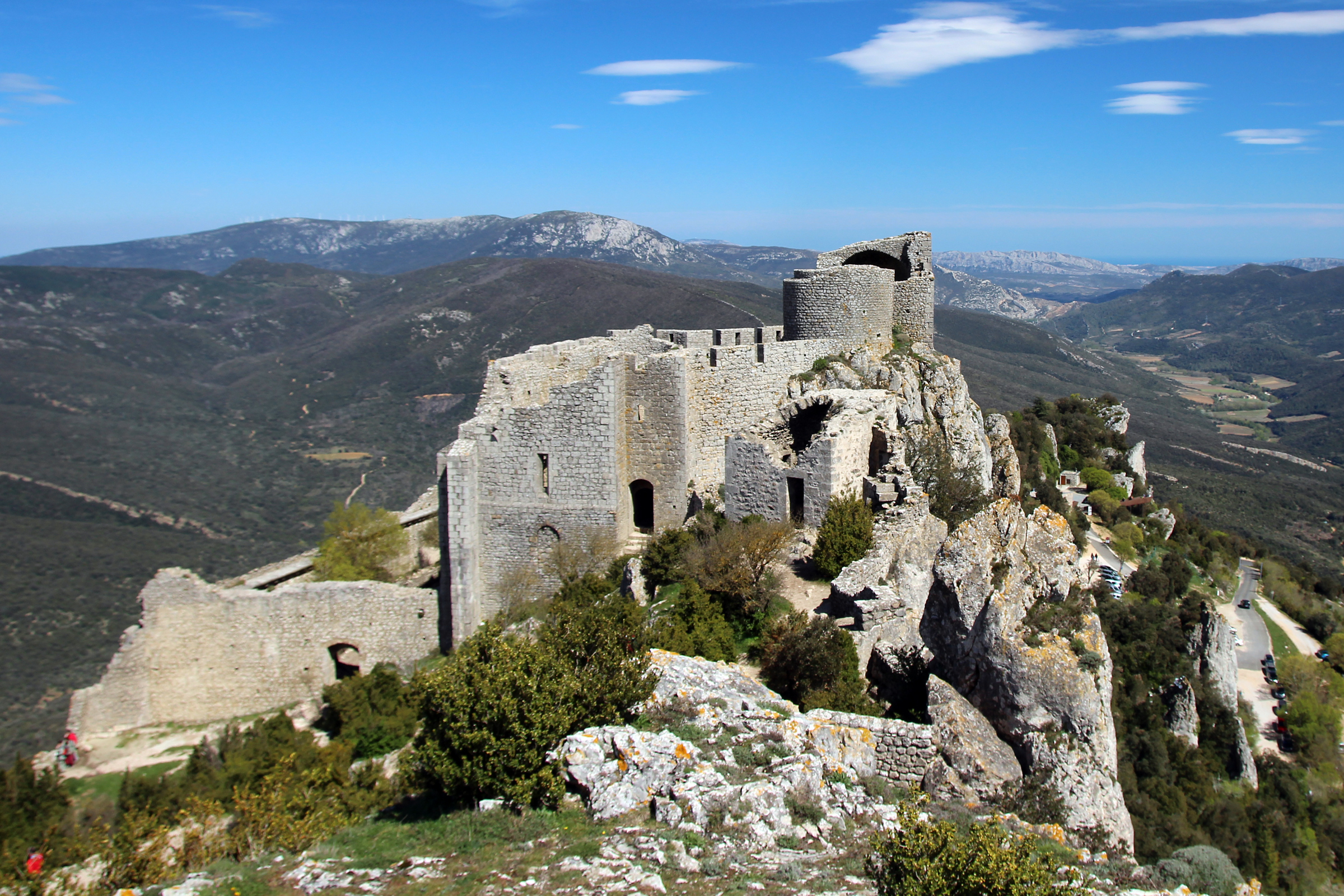
- Peyrepertuse Castle

Site information
- Type: Castle
- Condition: In ruins

Location
- Location within France
- Coordinates: 42°52′14″N 2°33′26″E

Site history
- Built: 13th century

UNESCO World Heritage Site
- Official name: Château de Peyrepertuse
- Part of: Royal Capetian Fortresses of Languedoc
- Criteria: Cultural: iv
- Reference: 1755
- Inscription: 2026 (48th Session)

Peyrepertuse (French pronunciation: [pɛʁpɛʁtyz]; Languedocien: Castèl de Pèirapertusa) is a ruined fortress and one of the so-called Cathar castles located high in the French Pyrénées in the commune of Duilhac-sous-Peyrepertuse, in the Aude département, and has been associated with the Counts of Narbonne and Barcelona. It was the former seigneury of the Peyrepertusès (in Occitan Pèirapertusés) which means "pierced stone."

== Geography ==
It is located on a limestone ridge at about an altitude of 800 m, on top of a hill which separates Duilhac from the town of Rouffiac-des-Corbières, towering over scrubland and vineyards. A strategic position which enables one at the same time to see far into the valleys that circle it, to control the mountain passes, or to send communication signals to the château de Quéribus a little further south.

The view of the castle from Duilhac (to the south) is impressive thanks to the 30 to 40 meter cliff on which the Castle is perched. The main entrance is located on the north side, but in the time of the Cathars, a secret passage through a narrow path behind a rocky overhang allowed entrance by means of a detachable ladder. Today, the secret passage's postern is closed off, but the path is still there.

== History ==
The castle is one of the "Five Sons of Carcassonne" along with the castles Quéribus, Puilaurens, Termes, and Aguilar, all situated atop 'unassailable' rocky peaks. It is called 'Celestial Carcassonne' because it is the biggest of the five castles and it is as vast as Carcassonne.

The site was occupied during Roman times from the beginning of the 1st century B.C., as recent archaeological excavations have shown. The first historical references to the castle appeared in 806. It was then Catalan and was called Perapertusès. It belonged to the Count of Besalú, a small county situated in Catalonia between Figueres and Olot according to a text from 1020.

It then passed into the earldom of Barcelona in 1111, and then into the Viscountcy of Narbonne. From 1180, the Count of Barcelona (Alphonse II, who later became the king of Aragon) secured his independence from vassalage to the king of France. The area became a de facto border.

At the time of the Albigensian Crusade, it was the fief of Guillaume de Peyrepertuse who, not wanting to submit, was excommunicated in 1224. He did finally submit after the failure of the siege of Carcassonne in 1240, and the castle became a French possession in the same year. In 1242, Saint-Louis decided to reinforce it and add a second part, the Sant Jordi dungeon, located higher up on the ridge. The Sant Jordi dungeon was then constructed in 1250-51 and the Old Dungeon as well as the Sainte-Marie Church were re-purposed.
The situation in the region was unclear until the signing of the Treaty of Corbeil in 1258, by which Catalonia was finally liberated from French feudal overlordship. It also fixed the French-Catalan border as just south of Peyrepertuse Castle and therefore it remained in French hands. Like its neighbors, the castles of Puilaurens and Queribus, Peyrepertuse was one of the royal fortresses which was reconstructed at the end of the 13th century to defend the border against the Crown of Aragon and then Spain until the 17th century.

In 1355, the castle was restored to its defensive state and Henry of Trastamare, pretender to the Castilian throne, routed at Navarette, was authorized by the King of France Charles V to take refuge there. In 1542, Jean de Graves, lord of Sérignan, seized the castle in the name of the Reformation, but was captured and executed.

The castle was decommissioned as a border point with the Treaty of the Pyrenees, in 1659 having lost its strategic importance, as the border with Spain was moved some 60 km to the south. Although the citadel was a lot less valuable after the annexation of Roussillon in 1658, a small garrison commanded by a junior officer was maintained until the French Revolution, during which it was abandoned. Sold as a National Property in 1820, its ruins remain today. The first campaign for the preservation of the monument began in 1950.

Since 1908, the site has been listed as a monument historique by the French Ministry of Culture. In July 2026, the Royal Capetian Fortresses of Languedoc (including this fortress) were designated by UNESCO as a World Heritage Site.

== Visiting the Castle ==
Today, the ruins of Peyrepertuse Castle welcome close to 100,000 visitors per year. They tower 800m above the region's vineyards and the village of Duilhac.

It is accessed by a road which ends in a car-park just below the cliff. Visitors can then use a path (about a quarter of an hour) to go round the castle to the east and enter by the main entrance on the north side. Although the castle is in ruins, most of the walls are still standing and some rooms are still well preserved (especially the fortified chapel in the Lower Castle).

For the brave and the hikers, a long hiking trail leaves the village of Duilhac (take the castle route for a few hundred metres before taking a small path to the right which has hairpin bends). It is a variant of the Cathar trail.

During storms or high winds, the climb is strongly discouraged and often prohibited to protect the visitors from lightning and fall risks particularly in the St. Louis staircase (connecting the former castle to the dungeon) which is slippery even in good weather.

The sheer limestone cliff is well-suited for rock climbing. Most of the routes extend all the way to the top.

== See also ==
- Cathar castles
- List of castles in France
