= Puilaurens =

Commune in Occitanie, France

- Commune
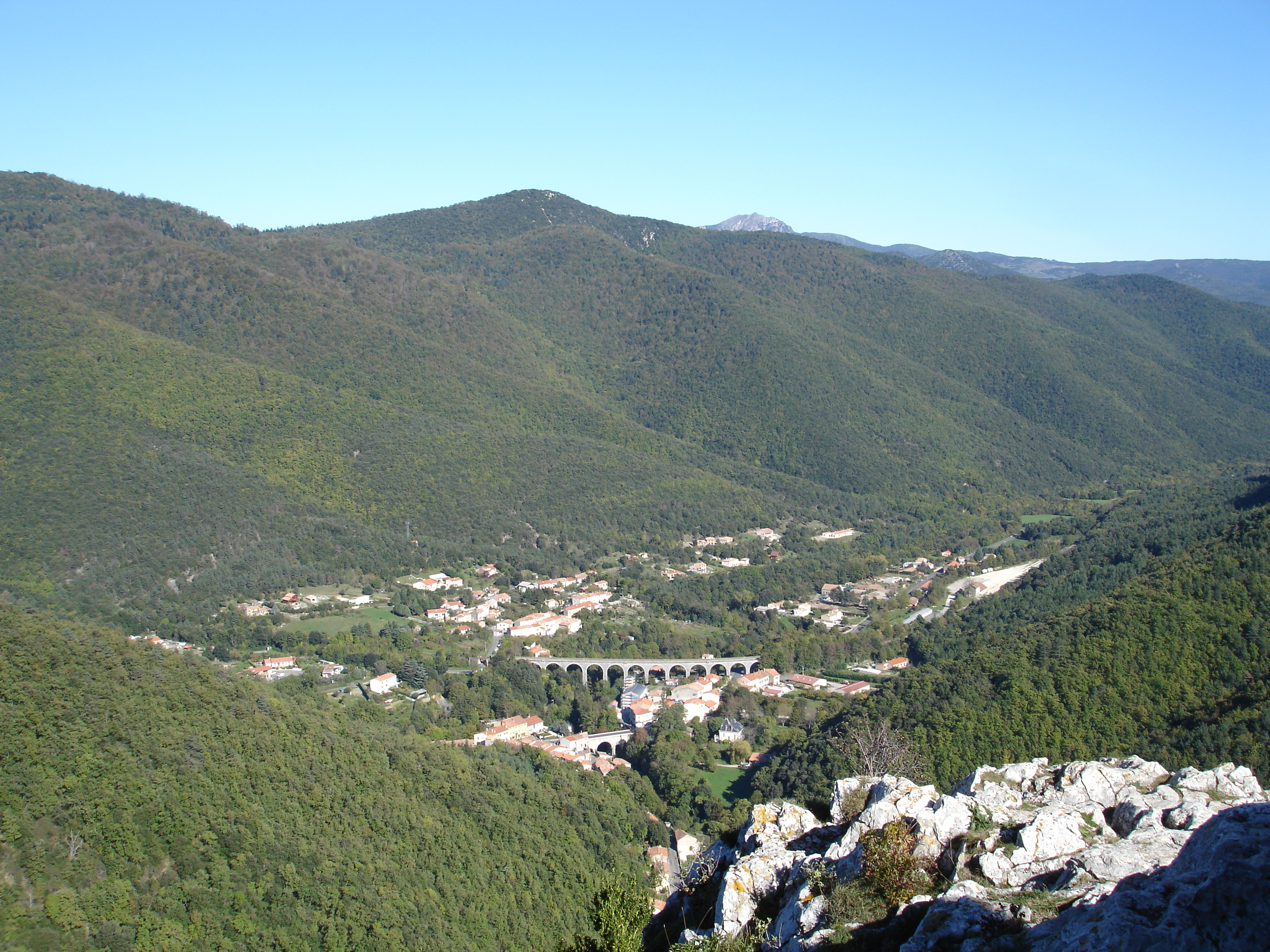
- A general view of Puilaurens

- Coat of arms
- Location of Puilaurens
- Location within France Location within Occitanie
- Coordinates: 42°48′38″N 2°18′21″E
- Country: France
- Region: Occitania
- Department: Aude
- Arrondissement: Limoux
- Canton: La Haute-Vallée de l'Aude
- Intercommunality: Pyrénées Audoises

Government
  - Mayor (2020–2026): Jacques Galy
- Area^{1}: 33.38 km^{2} (12.89 sq mi)
- Elevation: 424 m (1,391 ft)
- Highest elevation: 1,420 m (4,660 ft)
- Lowest elevation: 399 m (1,309 ft)
- Population (2023): 277
  - Density: 8.30/km^{2} (21.5/sq mi)
- Time zone: UTC+01:00 (CET)
  - Summer (DST): UTC+02:00 (CEST)
- INSEE/Postal code: 11302 /11140
- ^{1} French Land Register data, which excludes lakes, ponds, glaciers > 1 km^{2} (0.386 sq mi or 247 acres) and river estuaries.

Puilaurens (French pronunciation: [pɥiloʁɑ̃s], also non-officially: Lapradelle-Puilaurens; Occitan: La Pradèla e Puèglaurenç) is a commune in the Aude department in southern France.

It includes the hamlets of Lapradelle, Puilaurens and Lavignac. It is known for the medieval Puilaurens Castle.

== Geography ==
The commune is situated on the Boulzane river and the Green Meridian.

== History ==
The built-up area of Lapradelle did not exist until the 19th century and owes its development to activities related to water power taken from the Boulzane: textile spinning and sawmills.

In 1904, a railway was constructed from Quillan to Rivesaltes (the Carcassonne - Rivesaltes Line) passing through Lapradelle on a viaduct spanning the valley of the Boulzane. The line carried passengers until 1939. Afterwards it was used to transport feldspar between the Aude and the Pyrénées-Orientales, the railway line is today used in the summer for a tourist train, running between Axat and Rivesaltes.

In 1868, Puilaurens lost the hamlets of Salvezines and Le Caunil, established as the separate commune of Salvezines.

== Population ==
Its inhabitants are called Puilaurenois.

Historical population
Year	Pop.	±% p.a.
1968	378	—
1975	257	−5.36%
1982	222	−2.07%
1990	219	−0.17%
1999	236	+0.83%
2007	254	+0.92%
2012	265	+0.85%
2017	271	+0.45%
2023	277	+0.37%
Source: INSEE

== See also ==
- Communes of the Aude department
