= Cucugnan =

Commune in Occitanie, France

- Commune
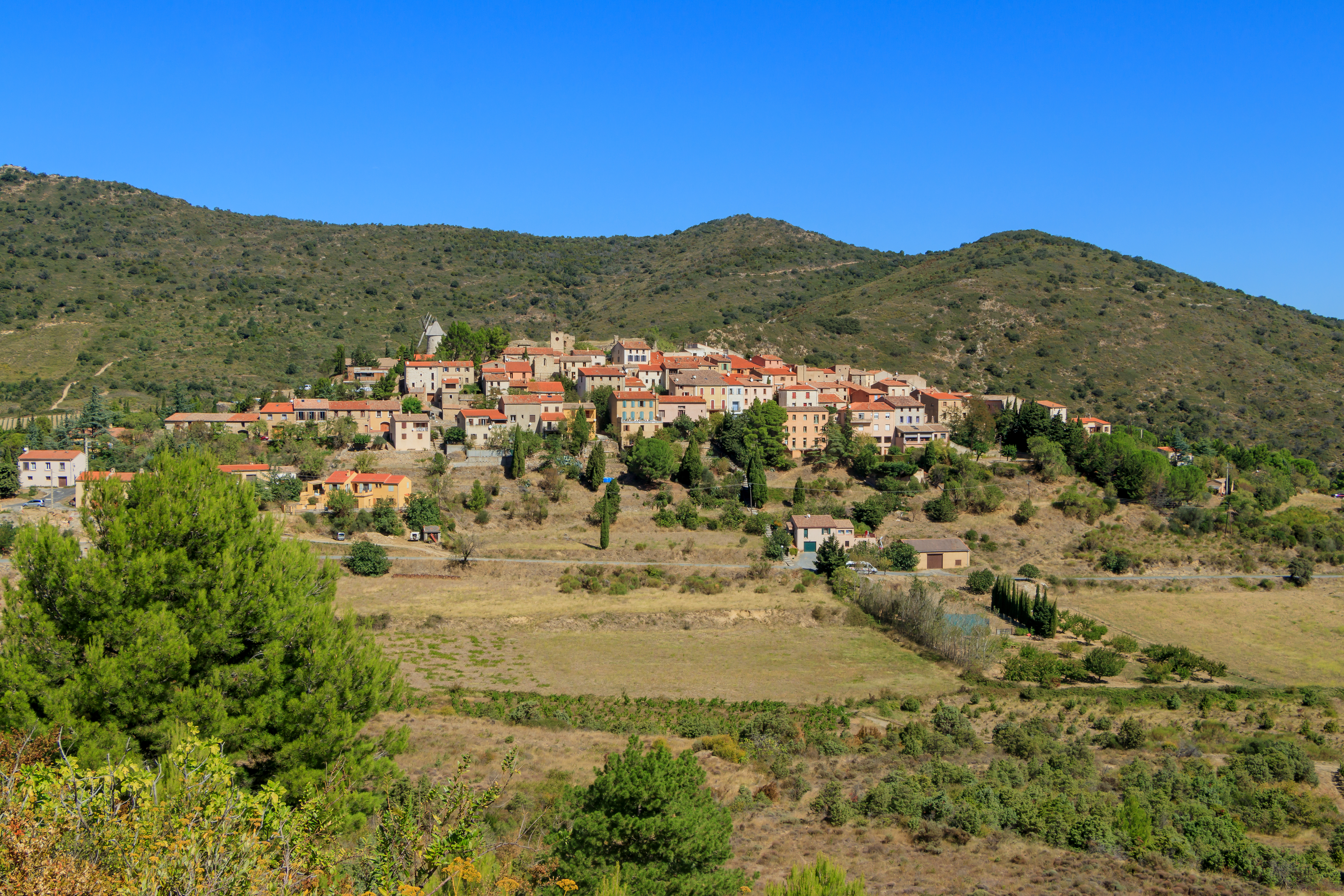
- A general view of Cucugnan

- Coat of arms
- Location of Cucugnan
- Location within France Location within Occitanie
- Coordinates: 42°51′07″N 2°36′11″E
- Country: France
- Region: Occitania
- Department: Aude
- Arrondissement: Narbonne
- Canton: Les Corbières

Government
  - Mayor (2020–2026): André Doumenc
- Area^{1}: 15.33 km^{2} (5.92 sq mi)
- Elevation: 360 m (1,180 ft)
- Highest elevation: 822 m (2,697 ft)
- Lowest elevation: 218 m (715 ft)
- Population (2023): 125
  - Density: 8.15/km^{2} (21.1/sq mi)
- Time zone: UTC+01:00 (CET)
  - Summer (DST): UTC+02:00 (CEST)
- INSEE/Postal code: 11113 /11350
- ^{1} French Land Register data, which excludes lakes, ponds, glaciers > 1 km^{2} (0.386 sq mi or 247 acres) and river estuaries.

Cucugnan (French pronunciation: [kykyɲɑ̃]; Occitan: Cucunhan) is a commune in the Aude department in southern France, approximately 29.5 kilometres (18.3 mi) north-west of Perpignan. The small village lies in a valley in the Corbières Massif, overlooked by the ruined Château de Quéribus, which stands at the top of a 728-metre (2,388 ft) hill to the south of Cucugnan.

== History ==
The first documented mention of a settlement called Cucuniano is a record of a gift of land from Roger I, Count of Carcassonne to the Abbey of Lagrasse in the year 951. In the 13th century, during the Albigensian Crusade against the Cathars, the Lord of Cucugnan participated in the Cathar resistance before he was forced to submit to King Louis IX. In 1495, Cucugnan was destroyed by the Spanish invaders and a new village grew up around the ruined medieval village.

== Landmarks ==
The village is clustered around a small hill, at the top of which stands its main landmark, a 17th-century windmill, the Moulin d'Omer. The windmill was owned by the Lords of Cucugnan until the French Revolution and was mentioned in historical archives dating from 1692. By the 1830s, it had fallen into ruin, but it was rebuilt and brought back into working order in a restoration project in 2003. Today the windmill is used for milling wheat and other grains for local culinary use.

The remains of a castrum are still visible above the windmill. Adjacent to the windmill is the 14th-century church of Saint Julien and Saint Basilissa. The church houses an unusual wooden statue of a pregnant Virgin Mary, a depiction considered controversial in traditional Catholic iconography.

The Château de Quéribus, which lies 2.1 kilometres (1.3 mi) south-east of Cucugnan, is a notable monument historique and it is sometimes regarded as the last stronghold of the followers of the Cathar faith after their defeat at Montségur in 1244. Marketed by the modern tourist industry as a "Cathar castle", Quéribus was originally built to defend the border between France and Aragon. The larger Château de Peyrepertuse, another influential citadel in the region, lies approximately 4.3 kilometres (2.7 mi) north-west of Cucugnan.

Cucugnan featured in the short story, "The Priest of Cucugnan", published in 1869 by the Parisian author Alphonse Daudet in his collection Letters from My Windmill, although the windmill referred to in the title is the Moulin Saint-Pierre at Fontvieille, Bouches-du-Rhône in the Provence-Alpes-Côte d'Azur region. Daudet's story is based on a sermon preached in 1858 by the Abbot Ruffié which attempts to persuade the local Christian congregation to turn to a virtuous life by recounting an imaginary trip to heaven, purgatory and hell, where the narrator finds all the old inhabitants of Cucugnan being tortured among the flames. The story reputedly originated with a Narbonne writer, Hercules Birat, later rewritten by Achille Mir of Carcassonne, and finally acquired and popularised by Daudet. Letters from My Windmill was adapted as a film in 1954 by Marcel Pagnol.

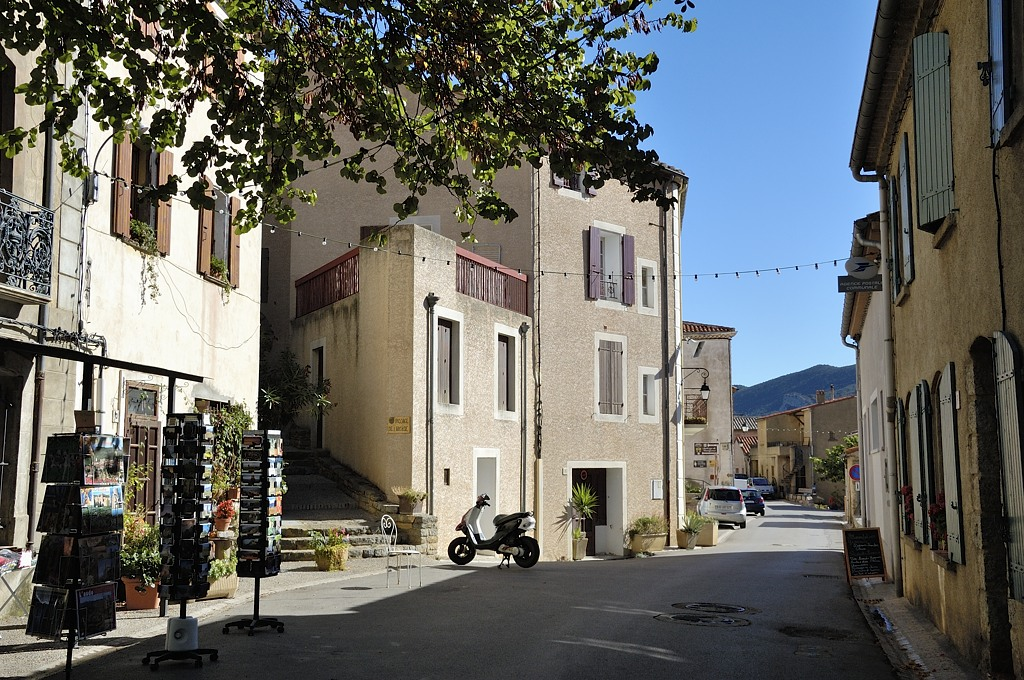
The main street in Cucugnan

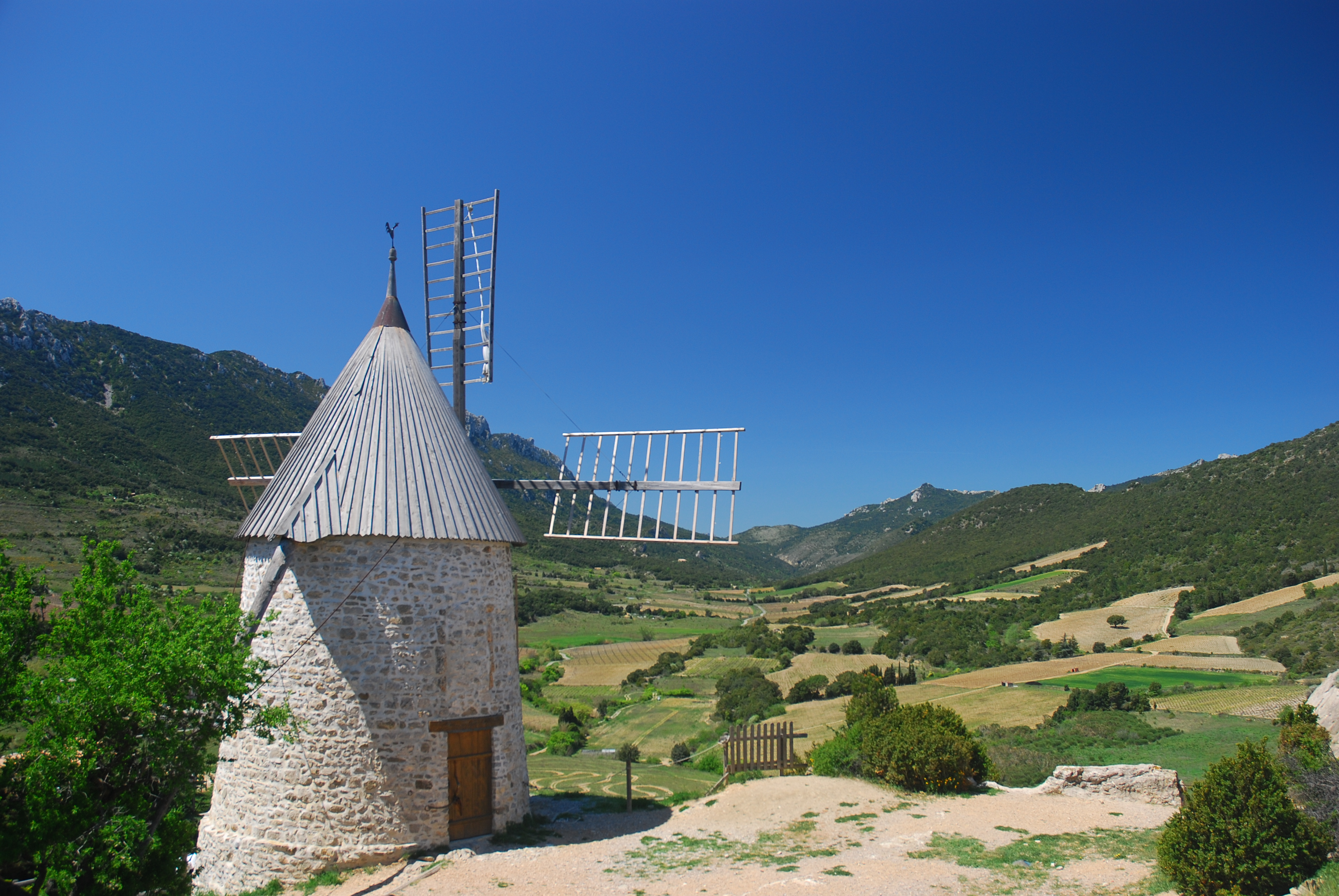
The windmill at Cucugnan

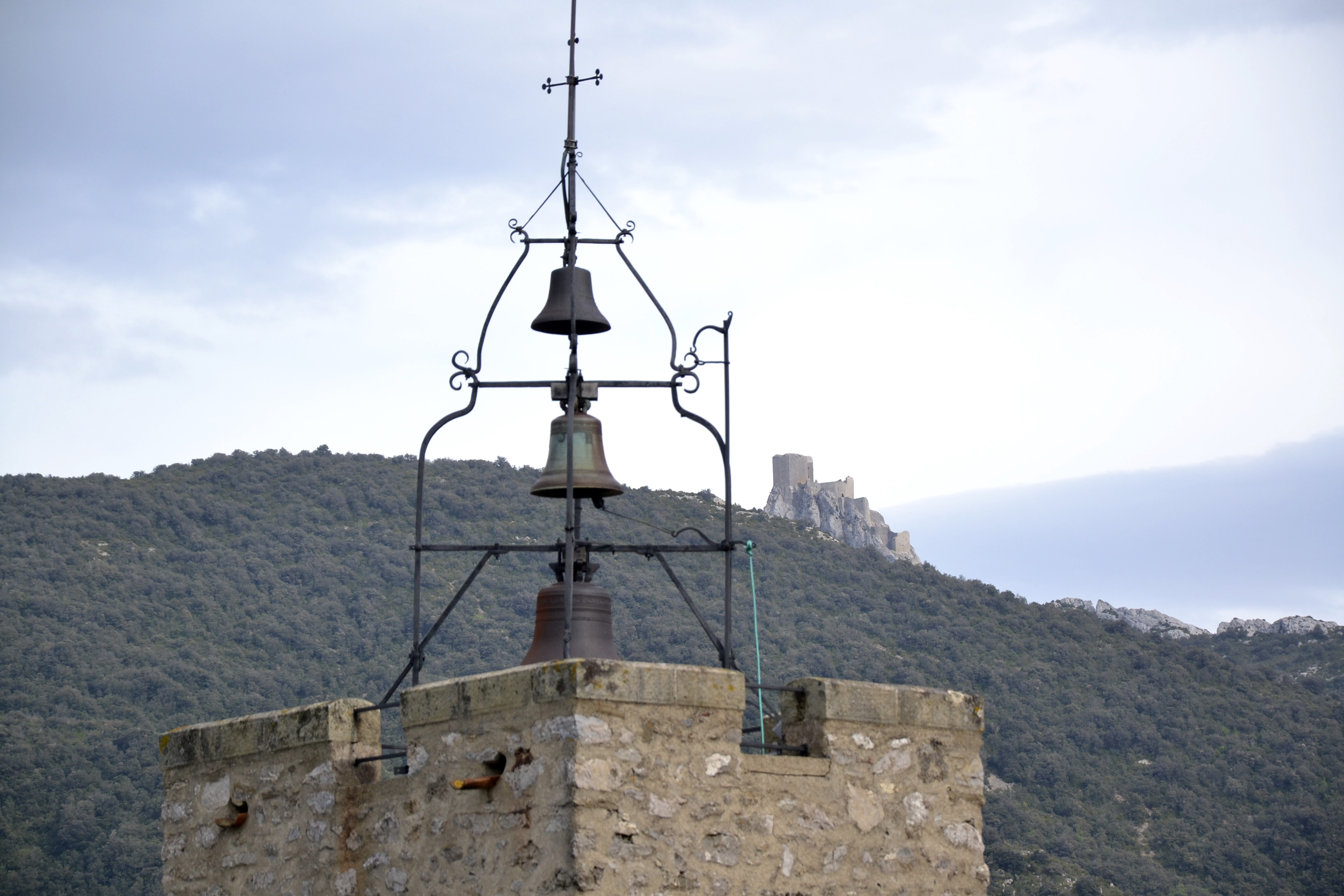
The view from Cucugnan over the church towards Quéribus Castle

== Population ==
Historical population
Year	Pop.	±% p.a.
1968	124	—
1975	102	−2.75%
1982	113	+1.47%
1990	128	+1.57%
1999	113	−1.38%
2007	133	+2.06%
2012	133	+0.00%
2017	123	−1.55%
2023	125	+0.27%
Source: INSEE

== See also ==
- Corbières AOC
- Communes of the Aude department
