= Villepinte =

Villepinte may refer to:

- Villepinte, Aude, a commune in southern France
- Villepinte, Seine-Saint-Denis, a commune in the northeastern suburbs of Paris, France
  - Villepinte station, on the RER B's Airport branch
