= Château Vicomtal Saint-Pierre de Fenouillet =

11th-century castle in Occitania, France

Coordinates: 42°47′35″N 2°22′50″E

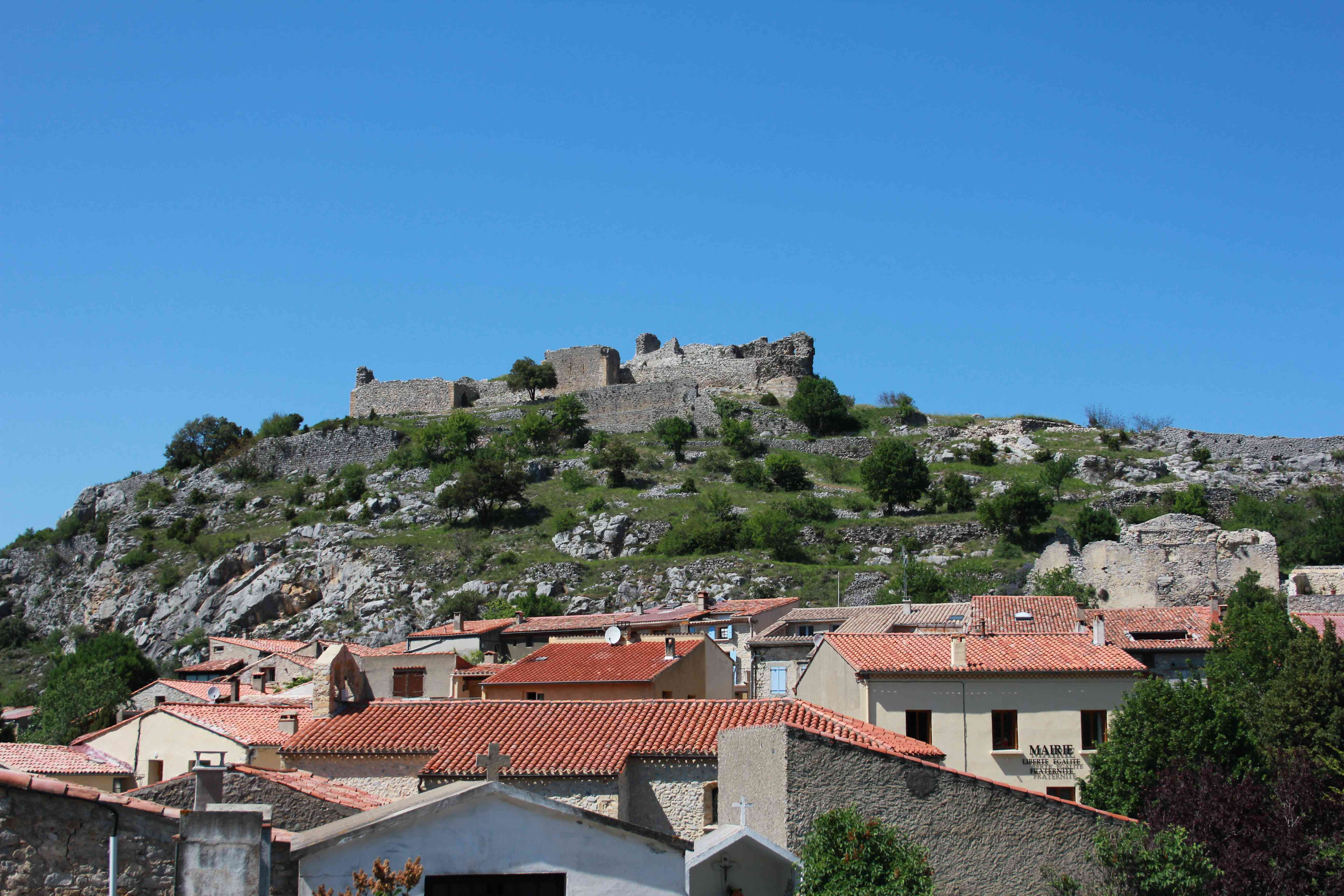

The Château Vicomtal Saint-Pierre de Fenouillet is a ruined 11th century castle in the commune of Fenouillet in the Pyrénées-Orientales département of France. Livret De Famille Mairie De Toulon

The castle is now the property of the commune. It has been the site of archaeological digs since 2000.

== See also ==
- List of castles in France

== Bibliography ==
- Laurent Fonquernie, La vicomté de Fenouillèdes du IXe au XIIIe siècle : DEA d'histoire sous la dir. de Pierre Bonnassie, Université Toulouse Le Mirail, 1997
- Thomas Charpentier, Peuplement et pouvoirs aux Xe-XIVe siècles. Évolution du territoire autour du château de Fenouillet : Master I, Histoire et Histoire de l'art et archéologie sous la dir. de François Amigues, Université de Perpignan, 2002
- Thomas Charpentier, "Fenouillet : Un centre de pouvoir vicomtal antérieur au XIIIe siècle", Archéothéma, no 23, July–August 2012 (ISSN 1969-1815)
