= Château de Quéribus =

Ruined castle in Cucugnan, France

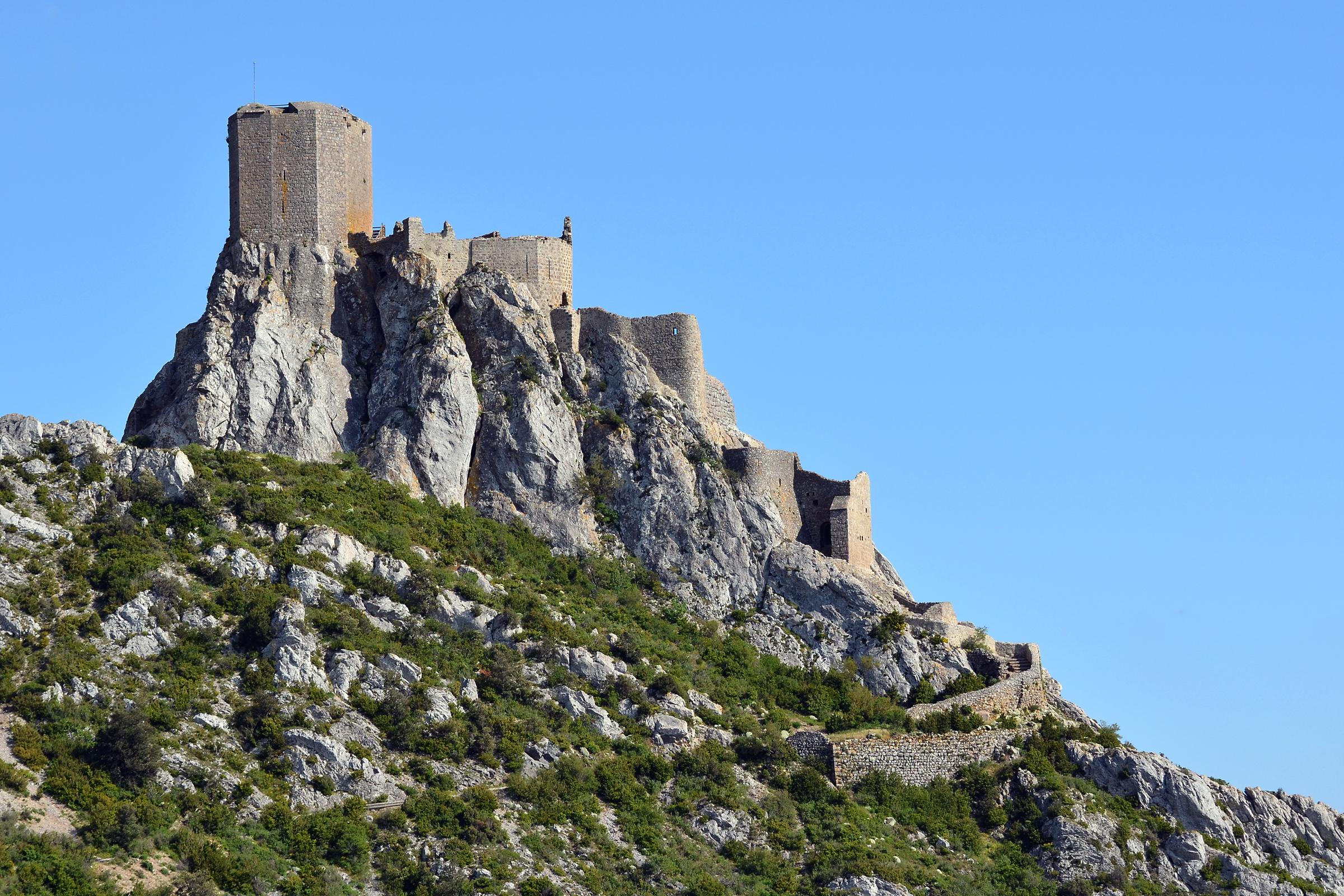
The Château de Quéribus

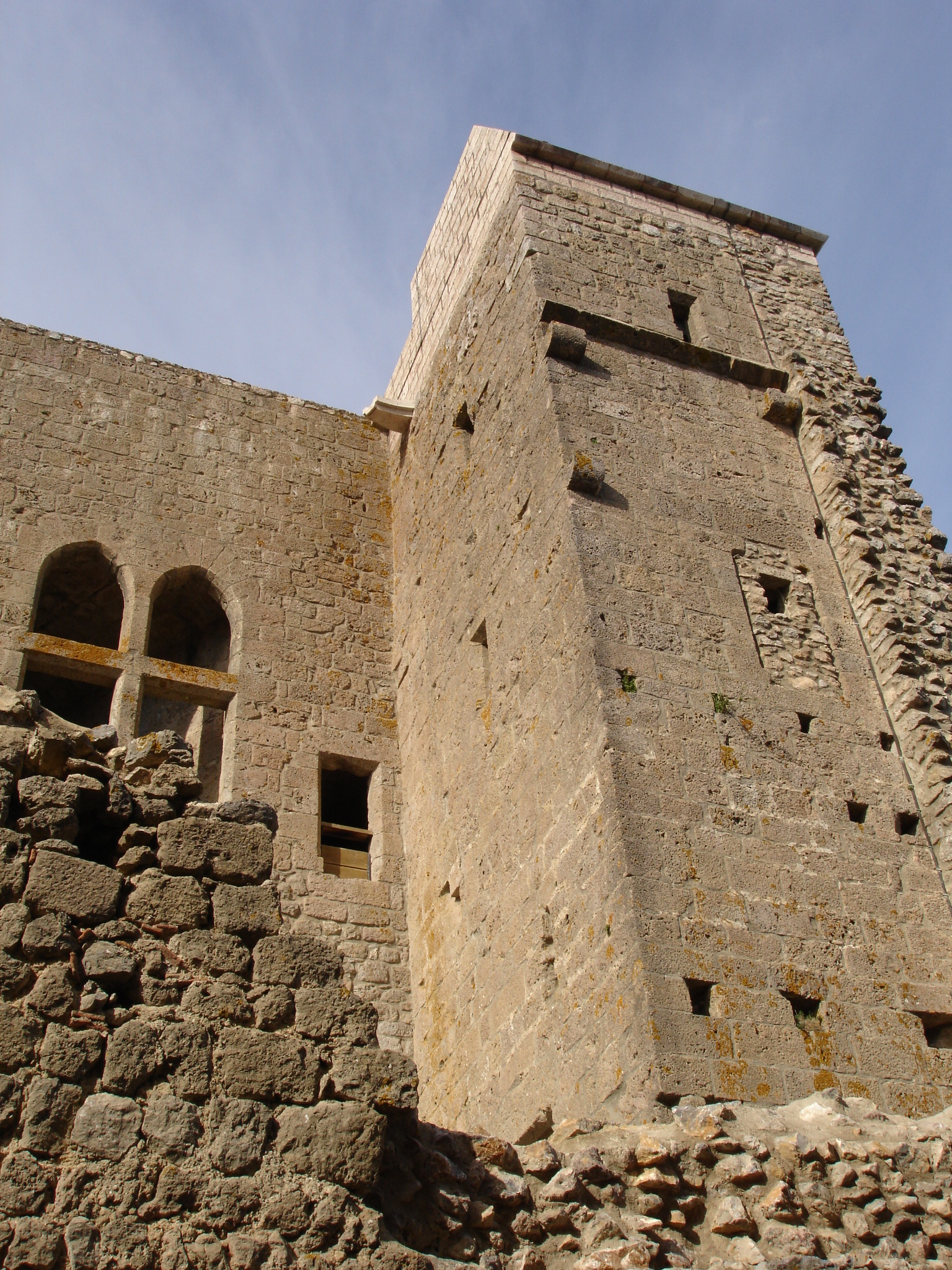
The keep of the Château de Quéribus

The Château de Quéribus (in Occitan Castèl de Querbús) is a ruined castle in the commune of Cucugnan in the Aude département of France. It has been listed as a monument historique by the French Ministry of Culture since 1907. In July 2026, the Royal Capetian Fortresses of Languedoc (including this castle) were designated by UNESCO as a World Heritage Site.

Queribus is one of the "Five Sons of Carcassonne", along with Aguilar, Peyrepertuse, Termes and Puilaurens: five castles strategically placed to defend the French border against the Spanish, until the border was moved in 1659.

It is sometimes regarded as the last Cathar stronghold. After the fall of Montségur in 1244, surviving Cathars gathered together in another mountain-top stronghold on the border of Aragon (the present border between the Aude and the Pyrénées-Orientales).

In 1255, a French army under the command of Olivier de Termes, a former Cathar knight, was dispatched to deal with these last remaining Cathars. Quéribus was defended by Chabert de Barbaira, who surrendered the castle without a fight in unclear circumstances. He may have been deceived by or have made a deal with his former friend Olivier de Termes. The fate of the Cathar occupiers of the castle is unknown, but they possibly slipped away, probably to Aragon or Piedmont - both regions where Cathar beliefs were still common, and where the Occitan language was spoken.

Quéribus is high and isolated. It stands on top of the highest peak for kilometres around. In 1951, restoration work on the turret began and, between 1998 and 2002, a complete restoration of the castle was undertaken. The castle is now accessible to visitors.

It is at coordinates 42°50′11″N 2°37′16″E and an altitude of 728 metres (2,388 ft). The nearest village is Maury, Pyrénées-Orientales.

== See also ==
- Cathar castles
- List of castles in France
- 1255 Siege of Quéribus in the French Wikipedia
