= Le Caunil =

Hamlet in France

Coordinates: 42°46′49″N 2°17′37″E

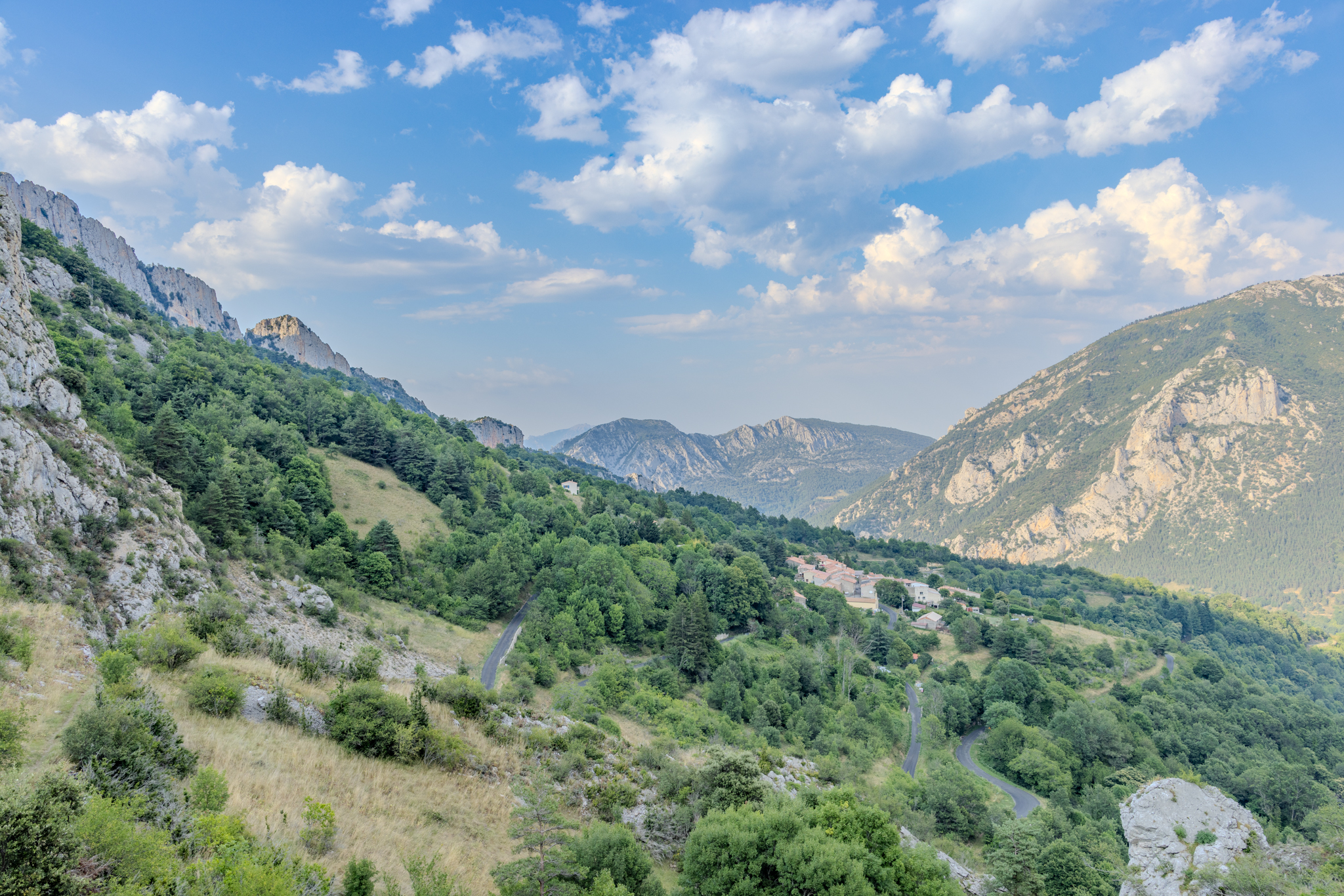
General view of Le Caunil

Le Caunil is a hamlet in the Aude department of the Occitanie region in France. It forms part of the commune of Salvezines.

== Geography ==
Le Caunil is situated at 850 metres above sea level, on the slopes of the Pyrenees above Salvezines and a few kilometres south-west of Château de Puilaurens, one of the famous Cathar castles dotting the region. The hamlet lies beneath a set of craggy cliffs and a forested plateau, and is a point of departure for the Forêt d'en Malo hiking trail.

Le Caunil has a small church as well as a school that is no longer in use.

The area between Le Caunil and Salvezines has significant deposits of feldspar, a raw material used in the ceramic industry, which has previously been mined from open quarries. There are several artisans with workshops in Le Caunil and the surrounding area.

== History ==
In the 10th century, the church in Le Caunil was under the authority of the nearby Abbey of Saint-Martin-Lys.
