= Château de Puilaurens =

Cathar castle in France

Coordinates: 42°48′13″N 2°17′58″E

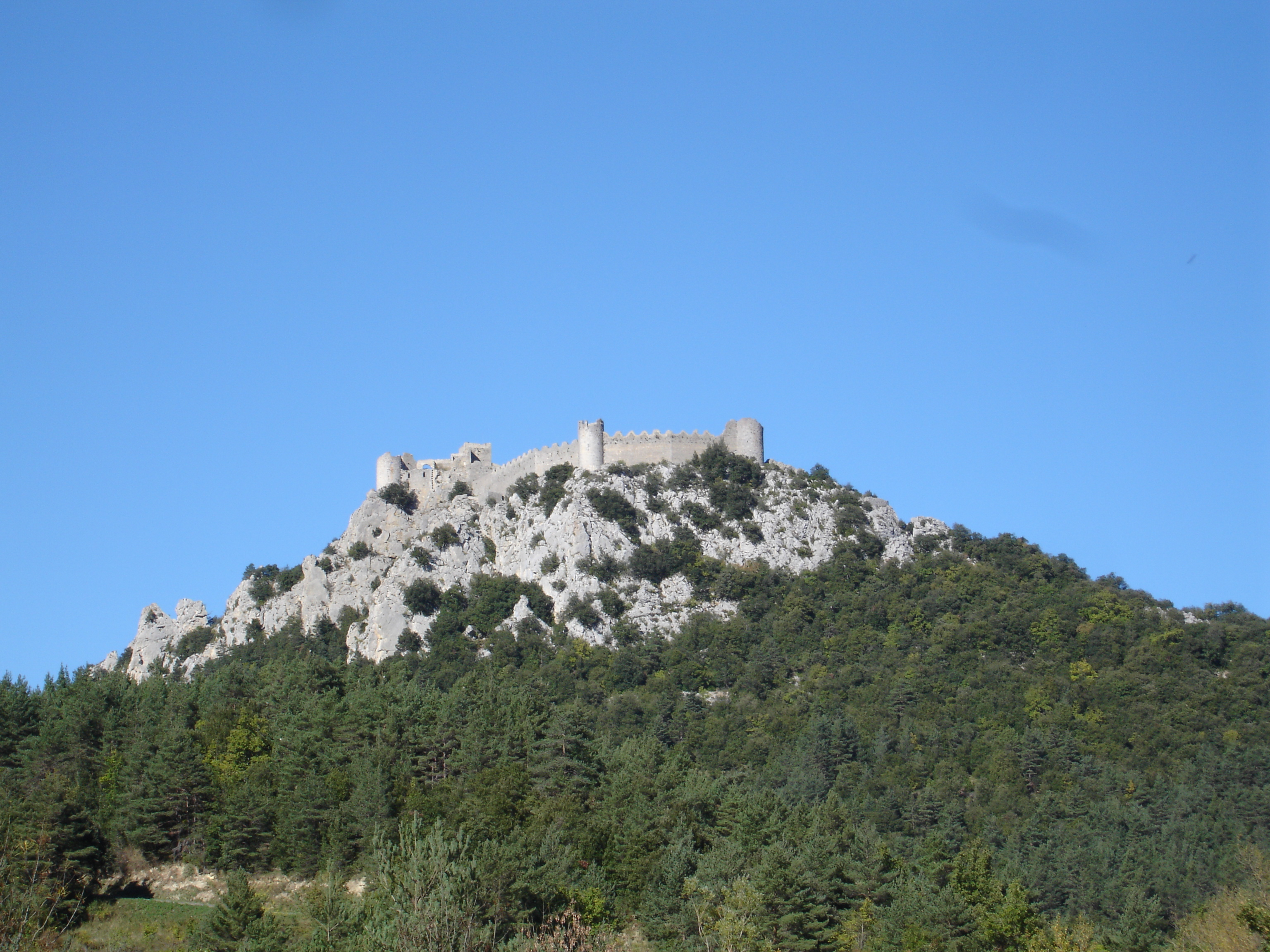
Puilaurens castle

Map of Puilaurens castle

The Château de Puilaurens (Puilaurens Castle, also Puylaurens; in Occitan: lo Castèl de Puèg-Laurenç) is one of the so-called Cathar castles in the commune of Lapradelle-Puilaurens in the Aude département. The castle is located above the Boulzane Valley and the villages of Lapradelle and Puilaurens. There is a path from Axat to the castle.

== History ==
=== Origins ===
The castle is located on Mont Ardu. This name appears for the first time in 958 in a charter where Lothair confirms the donation of Sunifred II, Count of Urgell, lord of Fenouillèdes, at the Abbey of Saint-Michel-de-Cuxa of the provostship of Puilaurens which is composed of the Boulzane valley or Sainte-Croix valley. The document also mentions the presence of a Saint-Laurent church serving as a fortified and hilltop refuge from the Carolingian period.

The first known castellan of Puilaurens is Pierre Catala who appears as a witness in the acts of Guillaume de Peyrepertuse in 1217. In 1229, Guillaume de Peyrepertuse commanded the castle of Puilaurens and, in 1242, it was held by Roger Catala, son of Pierre.

In addition to the castle, a village was built all around it, which made Puilaurens a Castle.

=== The Cathar presence ===
It is known only for the role of refuge of the castle during the Albigensian Crusade. In 1240, a woman named Saurine Rigaud, inhabitant of Fanjeaux and a Cathar believer, found refuge in Puilaurens, where she met twelve monks including eight women. In 1242, the Cathar deacon of Fenouillèdes, Pierre Paraire, stayed there. Several Perfecti were housed there from 1245 to 1246.

=== The annexation of the castle ===
Around 1250, the castle passed into the hands of the crown of France. By a letter dated August 1255, Louis IX of France ordered the seneschal of Carcassonne to fortify the castle. It is these works which inaugurate the appearance of the castle as we know it today. Saint Louis had it reinforced to defend the Languedoc against Aragonese incursions. The Treaty of Corbeil of 1258 made the castle one of the fortresses on the border of the kingdom facing the Principality of Catalonia within the Crown of Aragon.

It then becomes one of the "Five sons of Carcassonne" with the castles of Quéribus, Peyrepertuse, Château de Termes and Château d'Aguilar, all located at the top of “impregnable” rocky peaks.

After the work campaign under Louis IX, it was occupied in 1260 by the largest garrison on the entire border, under the orders of a Châtelaine, Odon de Monteuil, with a chaplain and 25 sergeants at arms In 1263 there is a record of the following taken to the Chateau, ten salted pigs, two bushels of wheat, six Minots of good flour, as well as crossbows measuring two feet, four of horn and two of wood, crossbow bolts, eighteen shields, five helmets.

Consolidation and fortification work continued under the leadership of Philip the Bold from 1270 to 1285.

The castle would resist several Aragonese attacks and will remain as the southernmost fortress in France. It resisted two Sieges but was taken in 1636 by default, as half of the garrison was at Port Leucate and 800 Catalans came from Prades and managed to seize it.

=== The abandonment of the castle ===
Like the other sons of Carcassonne, the castle of Puilaurens was gradually abandoned following the Treaty of the Pyrenees ratified in 1659 which fixed the French-Spanish border at the level of the Pyrenees ridges. A weak garrison occupied the citadel for some time. Then, poorly defended and poorly maintained from the end of the 17th century, it was definitively abandoned during the Revolution.

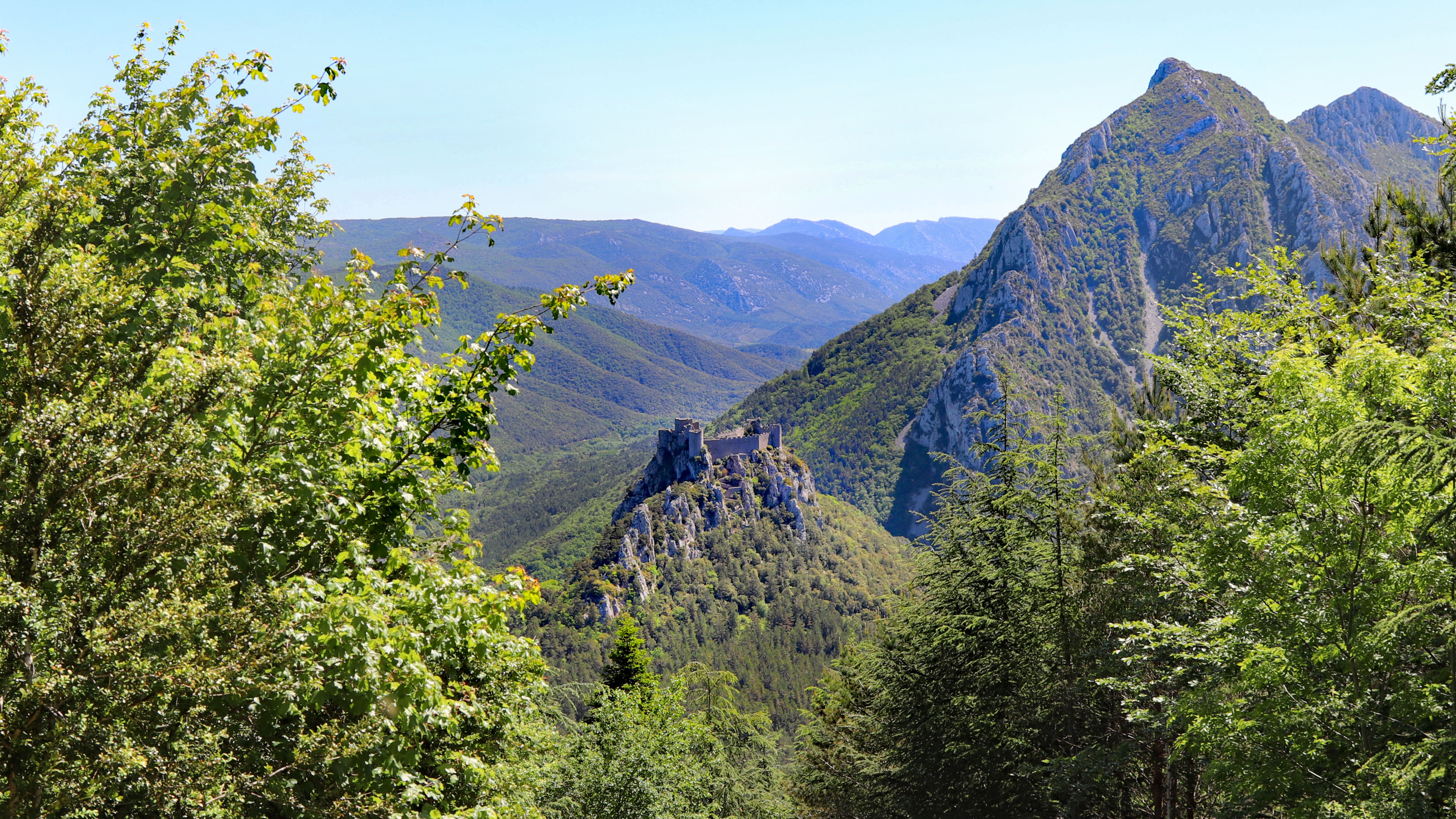

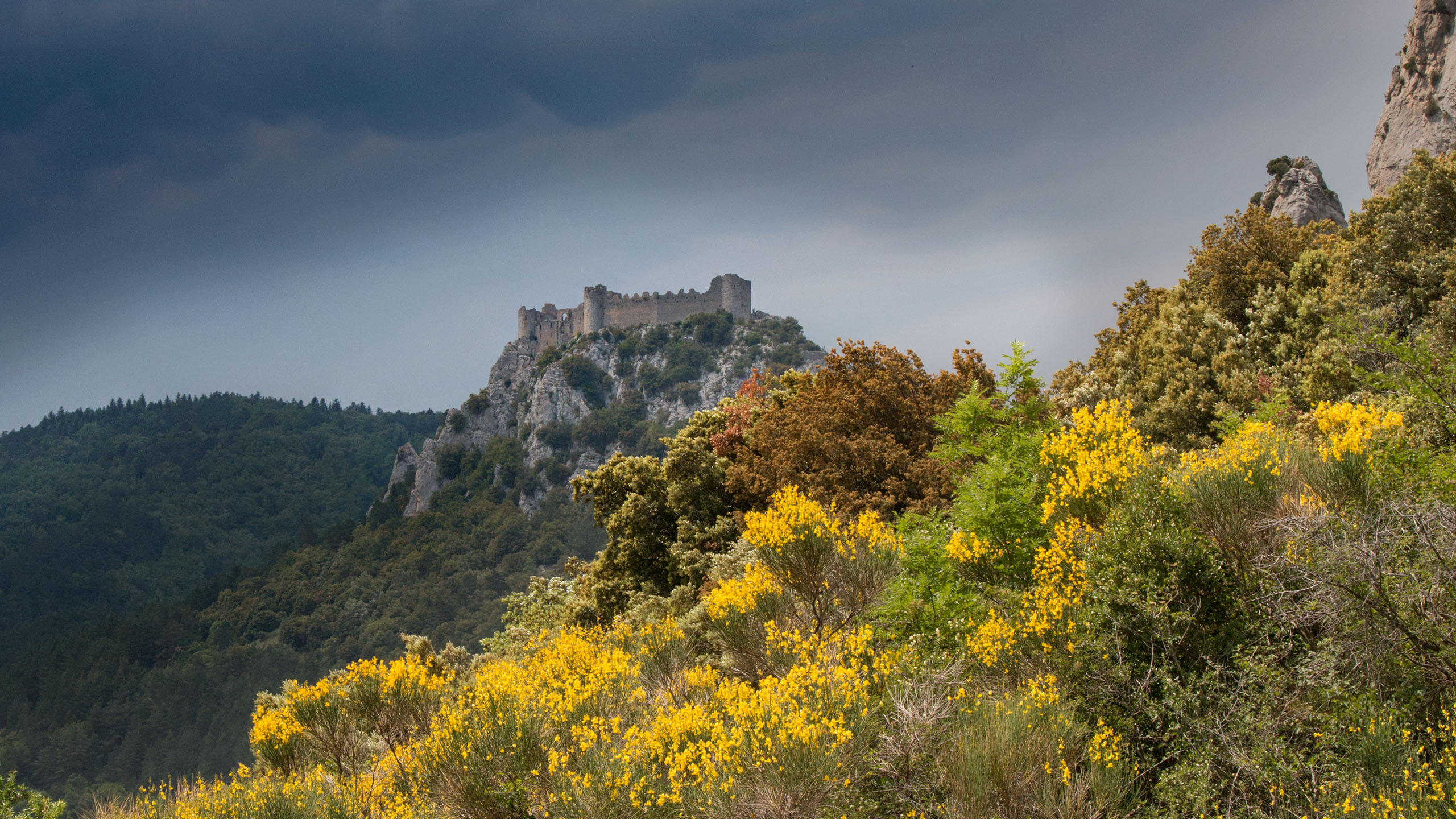

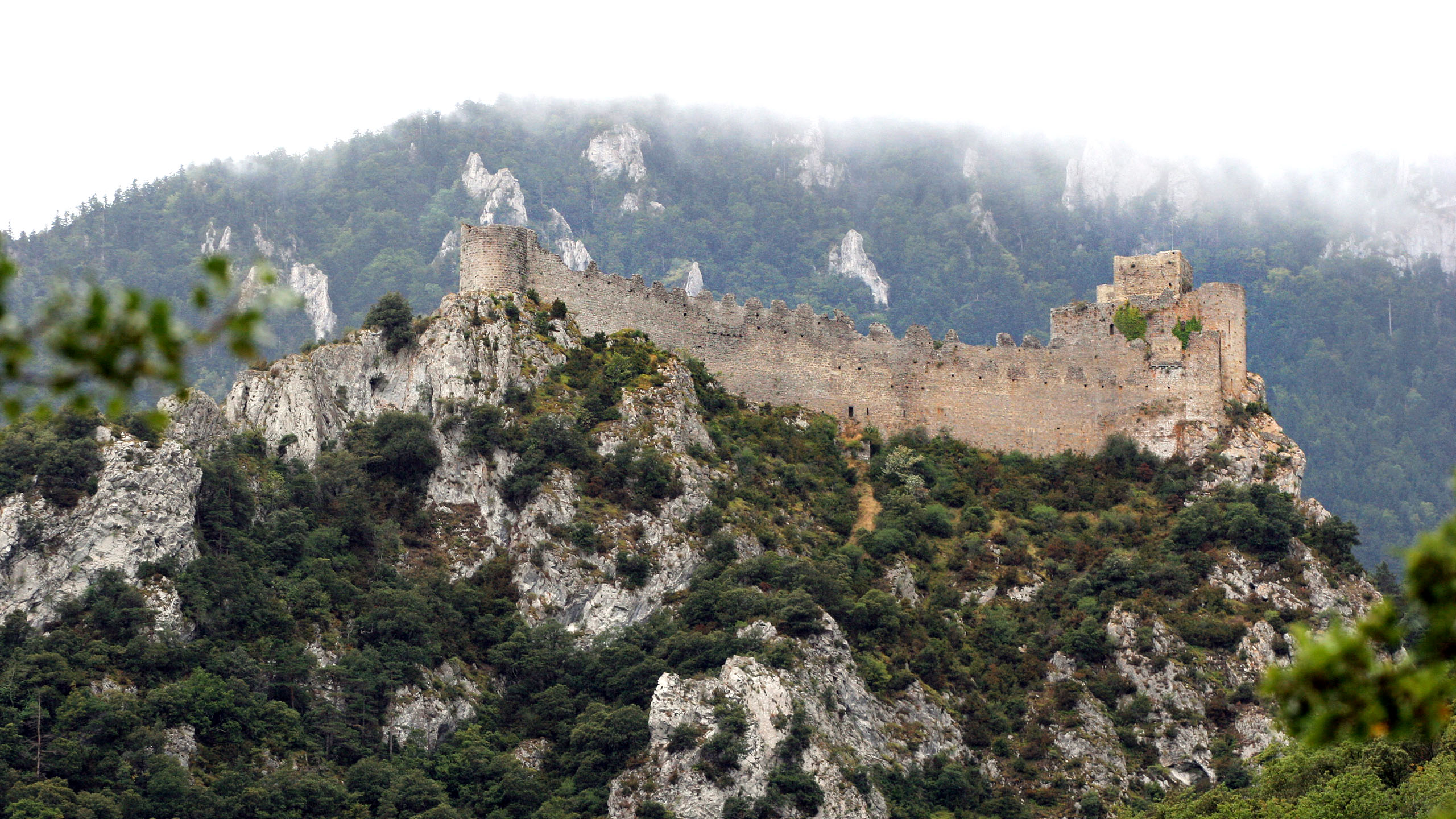

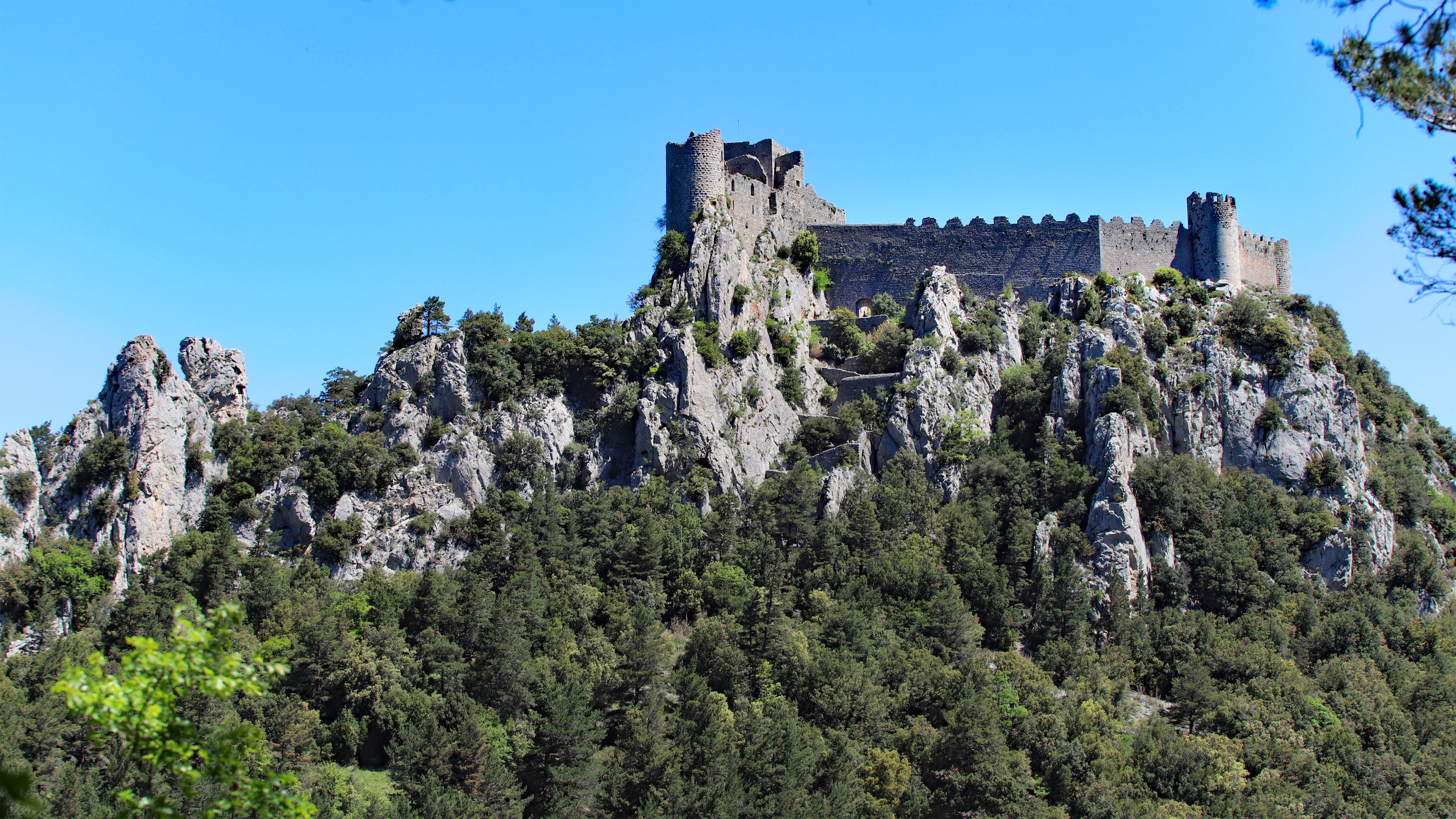

The castle has been listed as a monument historique by the French Ministry of Culture since 1902. In July 2026, the Royal Capetian Fortresses of Languedoc (including this castle) were designated by UNESCO as a World Heritage Site.

== See also ==
- List of castles in France
- Cathar castles
