= Duilhac-sous-Peyrepertuse =

Commune in Occitanie, France

- Commune
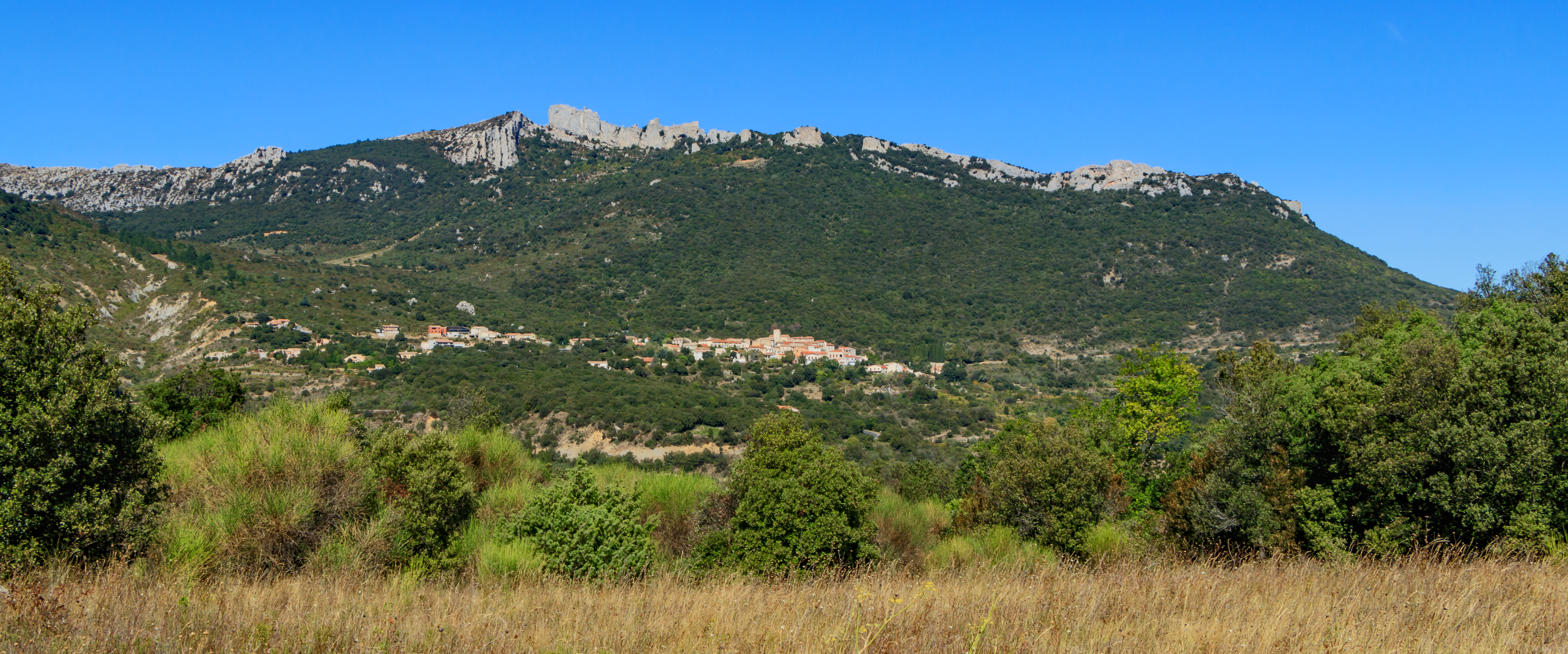
- Duilhac-sous-Peyrepertuse with the Peyrepertuse castle

- Coat of arms
- Location of Duilhac-sous-Peyrepertuse
- Location within France Location within Occitanie
- Coordinates: 42°51′50″N 2°34′02″E
- Country: France
- Region: Occitania
- Department: Aude
- Arrondissement: Narbonne
- Canton: Les Corbières

Government
  - Mayor (2020–2026): Alex Rainero
- Area^{1}: 21.09 km^{2} (8.14 sq mi)
- Elevation: 380 m (1,250 ft)
- Highest elevation: 966 m (3,169 ft)
- Lowest elevation: 233 m (764 ft)
- Population (2023): 140
  - Density: 6.6/km^{2} (17/sq mi)
- Time zone: UTC+01:00 (CET)
  - Summer (DST): UTC+02:00 (CEST)
- INSEE/Postal code: 11123 /11350
- ^{1} French Land Register data, which excludes lakes, ponds, glaciers > 1 km^{2} (0.386 sq mi or 247 acres) and river estuaries.

Duilhac-sous-Peyrepertuse (French pronunciation: [dɥijak su pɛʁpɛʁtyz]; Languedocien: Dulhac jos Pèirapertusa) is a commune in the Aude department in southern France.

== Population ==
Historical population
Year	Pop.	±% p.a.
1968	111	—
1975	97	−1.91%
1982	94	−0.45%
1990	87	−0.96%
1999	104	+2.00%
2007	122	+2.02%
2012	143	+3.23%
2017	146	+0.42%
2023	140	−0.70%
Source: INSEE

== See also ==
- Corbières AOC
- Communes of the Aude department
