= Salvezines =

Commune in Occitanie, France

- Commune
- Coat of arms
- Location of Salvezines
- Location within France Location within Occitanie
- Coordinates: 42°46′52″N 2°18′27″E
- Country: France
- Region: Occitania
- Department: Aude
- Arrondissement: Limoux
- Canton: La Haute-Vallée de l'Aude
- Intercommunality: Pyrénées Audoises

Government
  - Mayor (2020–2026): Sébastien Torreilles
- Area^{1}: 20.09 km^{2} (7.76 sq mi)
- Elevation: 500 m (1,600 ft)
- Highest elevation: 1,483 m (4,865 ft)
- Lowest elevation: 495 m (1,624 ft)
- Population (2023): 70
  - Density: 3.5/km^{2} (9.0/sq mi)
- Time zone: UTC+01:00 (CET)
  - Summer (DST): UTC+02:00 (CEST)
- INSEE/Postal code: 11373 /11140
- ^{1} French Land Register data, which excludes lakes, ponds, glaciers > 1 km^{2} (0.386 sq mi or 247 acres) and river estuaries.

Salvezines (French pronunciation: [salvəzin]; Occitan: Salvesinas) is a commune in the Aude département in southern France. It includes the village of Salvezines and the hamlet of Le Caunil.

== Population ==
Historical population
Year	Pop.	±% p.a.
1968	145	—
1975	103	−4.77%
1982	100	−0.42%
1990	101	+0.12%
1999	108	+0.75%
2007	98	−1.21%
2012	72	−5.98%
2017	77	+1.35%
2023	70	−1.58%
Source: INSEE

== See also ==
- Communes of the Aude department
