= Tuchan =

Commune in Occitanie, France

- Commune
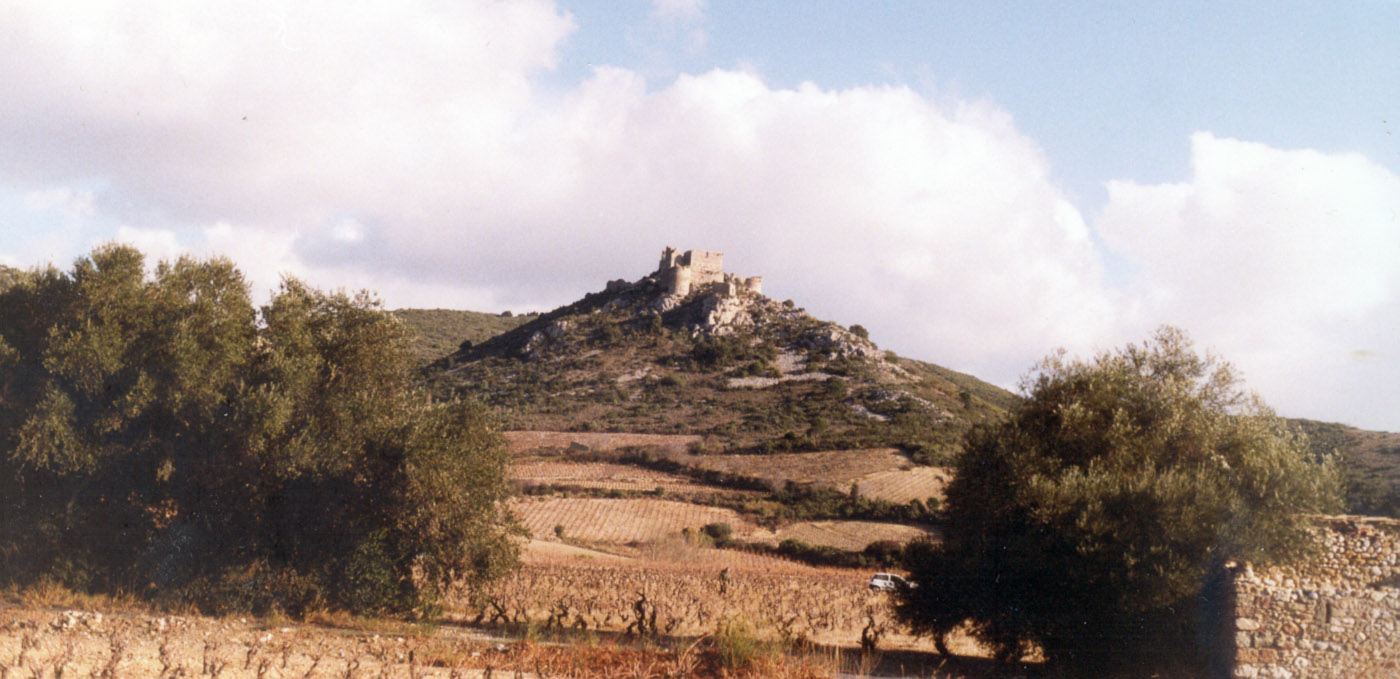
- The Aguilar chateau in Tuchan

- Coat of arms
- Location of Tuchan
- Location within France Location within Occitanie
- Coordinates: 42°53′21″N 2°43′12″E
- Country: France
- Region: Occitania
- Department: Aude
- Arrondissement: Narbonne
- Canton: Les Corbières

Government
  - Mayor (2020–2026): Béatrice Bertrand
- Area^{1}: 59.52 km^{2} (22.98 sq mi)
- Elevation: 119 m (390 ft)
- Highest elevation: 920 m (3,020 ft)
- Lowest elevation: 136 m (446 ft)
- Population (2023): 791
  - Density: 13.3/km^{2} (34.4/sq mi)
- Time zone: UTC+01:00 (CET)
  - Summer (DST): UTC+02:00 (CEST)
- INSEE/Postal code: 11401 /11350
- ^{1} French Land Register data, which excludes lakes, ponds, glaciers > 1 km^{2} (0.386 sq mi or 247 acres) and river estuaries.

Tuchan (French pronunciation: [tyʃɑ̃]; Occitan: Tuissan) is a commune in the Aude department in southern France.

== Population ==
Historical population
Year	Pop.	±% p.a.
1968	862	—
1975	804	−0.99%
1982	814	+0.18%
1990	794	−0.31%
1999	803	+0.13%
2007	815	+0.19%
2012	796	−0.47%
2017	786	−0.25%
2023	791	+0.11%
Source: INSEE

== See also ==
- Fitou AOC
- Corbières AOC
- Communes of the Aude department
