= Villepinte, Aude =

Commune in Occitanie, France

Villepinte
- Commune
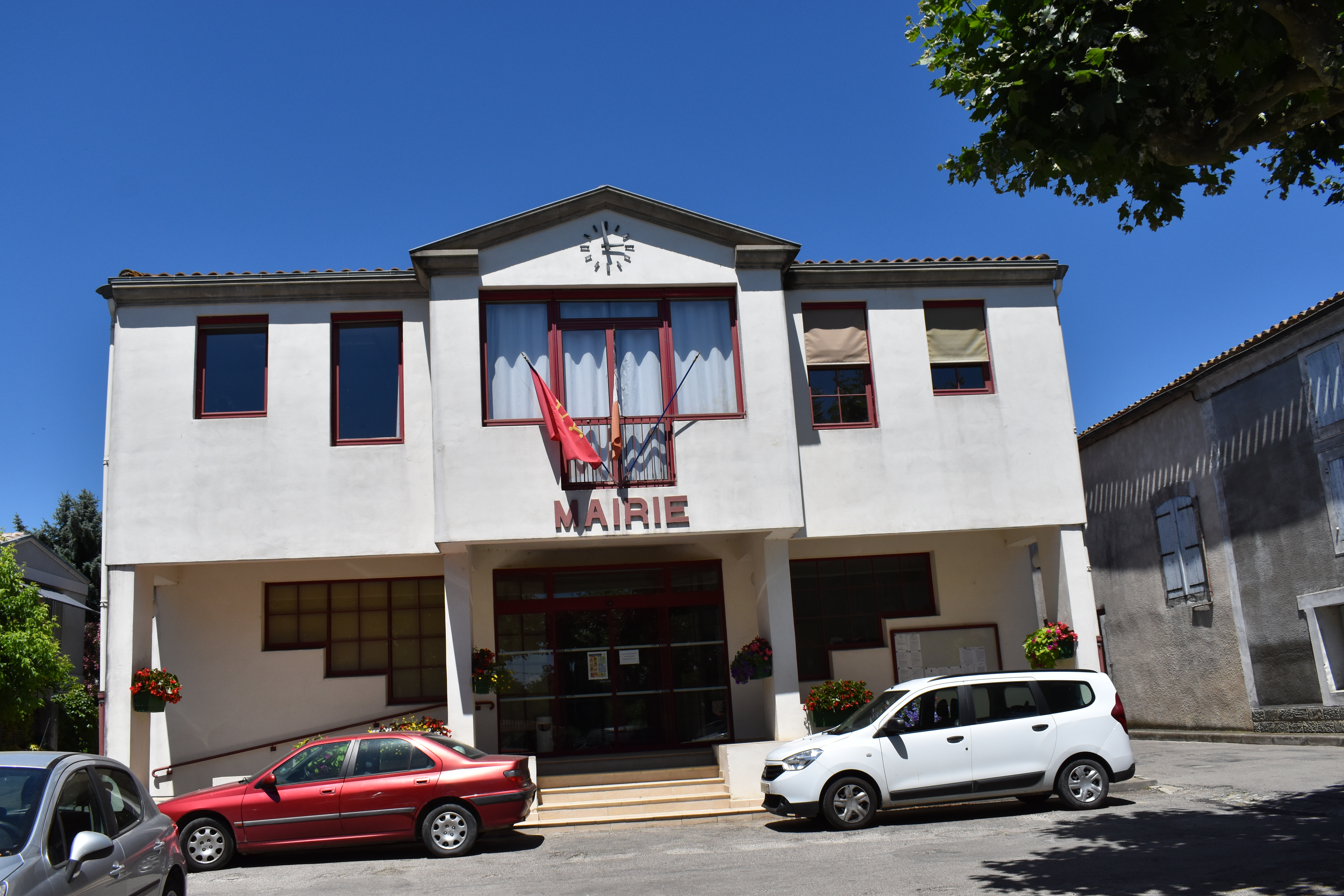
- Town hall

- Coat of arms
- Location of Villepinte
- Location within France Location within Occitanie
- Coordinates: 43°16′57″N 2°05′14″E
- Country: France
- Region: Occitania
- Department: Aude
- Arrondissement: Carcassonne
- Canton: La Piège au Razès
- Intercommunality: Piège Lauragais Malepère

Government
  - Mayor (2020–2026): Alain Rouquet
- Area^{1}: 15.4 km^{2} (5.9 sq mi)
- Elevation: 130 m (430 ft)
- Highest elevation: 202 m (663 ft)
- Lowest elevation: 124 m (407 ft)
- Population (2023): 1,243
  - Density: 80.7/km^{2} (209/sq mi)
- Time zone: UTC+01:00 (CET)
  - Summer (DST): UTC+02:00 (CEST)
- INSEE/Postal code: 11434 /11150
- ^{1} French Land Register data, which excludes lakes, ponds, glaciers > 1 km^{2} (0.386 sq mi or 247 acres) and river estuaries.

Villepinte (French pronunciation: [vilpɛ̃t]; Occitan: Vilapinta) is a commune in the Aude department in southern France.

== Population ==
Historical population
Year	Pop.	±% p.a.
1968	771	—
1975	762	−0.17%
1982	916	+2.66%
1990	1,017	+1.32%
1999	1,024	+0.08%
2007	1,218	+2.19%
2012	1,249	+0.50%
2017	1,303	+0.85%
2023	1,243	−0.78%
Source: INSEE

== See also ==
- Communes of the Aude department
