= Fenouillet-du-Razès =

Commune in Occitanie, France

- Commune
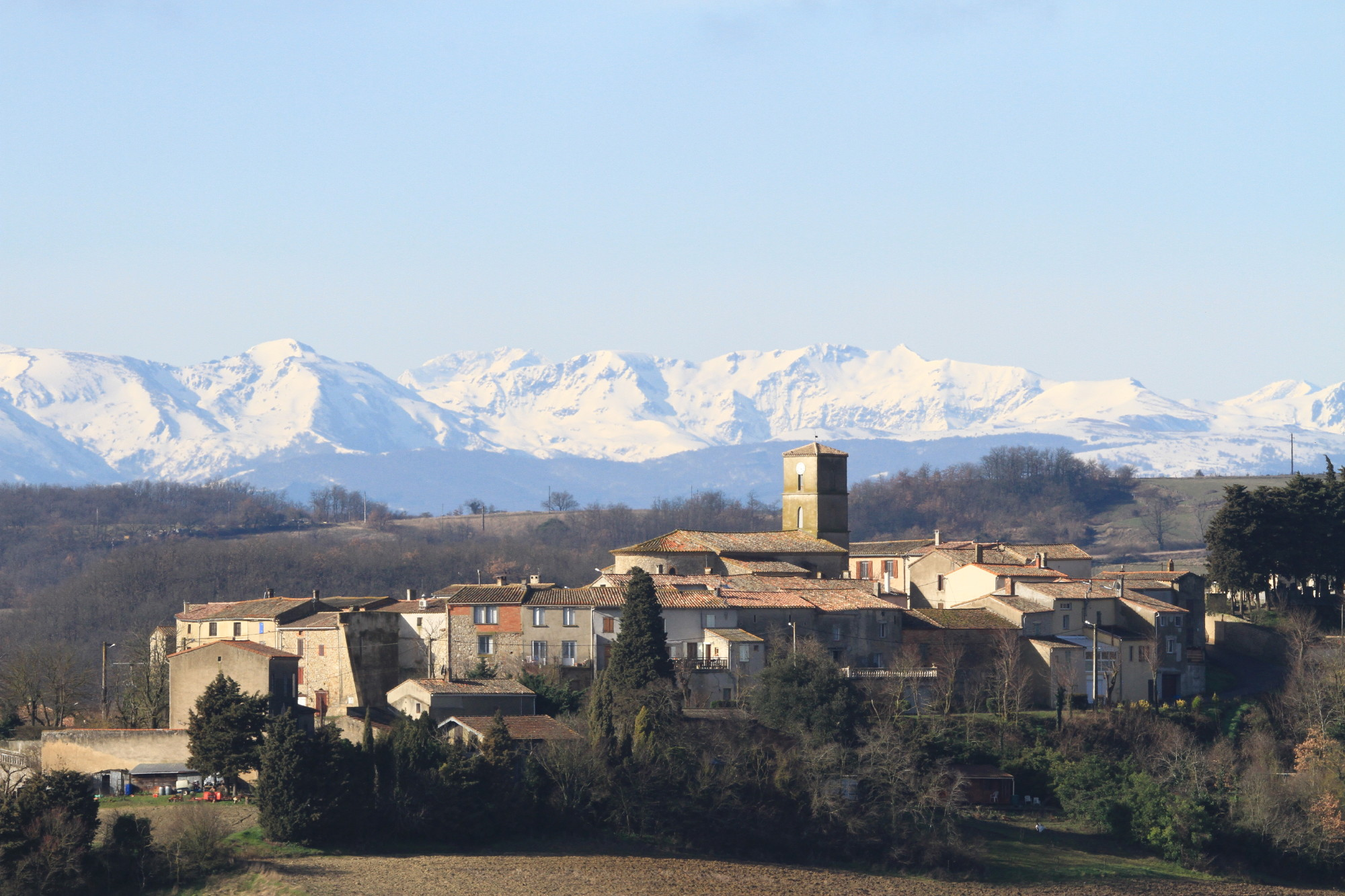
- A general view of Fenouillet-du-Razès

- Coat of arms
- Location of Fenouillet-du-Razès
- Location within France Location within Occitanie
- Coordinates: 43°09′29″N 2°01′46″E
- Country: France
- Region: Occitania
- Department: Aude
- Arrondissement: Carcassonne
- Canton: La Piège au Razès

Government
  - Mayor (2020–2026): Bruno Bertrand
- Area^{1}: 7.22 km^{2} (2.79 sq mi)
- Elevation: 420 m (1,380 ft)
- Highest elevation: 430 m (1,410 ft)
- Lowest elevation: 257 m (843 ft)
- Population (2023): 78
  - Density: 11/km^{2} (28/sq mi)
- Time zone: UTC+01:00 (CET)
  - Summer (DST): UTC+02:00 (CEST)
- INSEE/Postal code: 11139 /11240
- ^{1} French Land Register data, which excludes lakes, ponds, glaciers > 1 km^{2} (0.386 sq mi or 247 acres) and river estuaries.

Fenouillet-du-Razès (French pronunciation: [fənujɛ dy ʁazɛs]; Languedocien: Fenolhet) is a commune in the Aude department in southern France.

== Population ==
Historical population
Year	Pop.	±% p.a.
1968	145	—
1975	115	−3.26%
1982	97	−2.40%
1990	87	−1.35%
1999	80	−0.93%
2007	87	+1.05%
2012	90	+0.68%
2017	85	−1.14%
2023	78	−1.42%
Source: INSEE

== See also ==
- Communes of the Aude department
