= Château d'Aguilar =

12th-century castle in Tuchan in the Aude département of France

- Tuchan, Aude, France
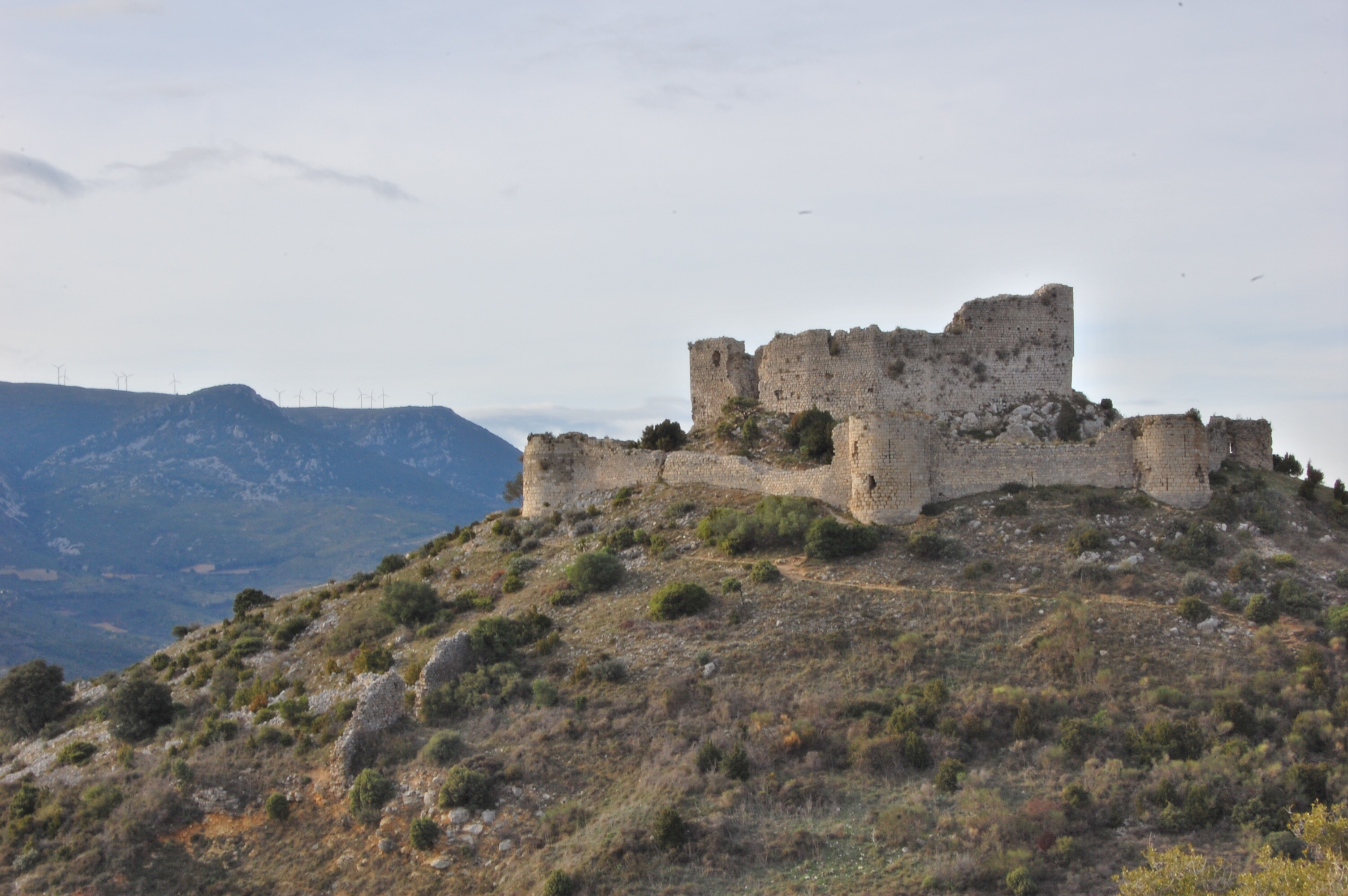
- The Château d'Aguilar

Site information
- Type: Castle
- Condition: In ruins

Location
- Location within France
- Coordinates: 42°53′26″N 2°44′49″E

Site history
- Built: 12th century

UNESCO World Heritage Site
- Official name: Château d'Aguilar
- Part of: Royal Capetian Fortresses of Languedoc
- Criteria: Cultural: iv
- Reference: 1755
- Inscription: 2026 (48th Session)

The Château d'Aguilar (Languedocien: Castèl d’Aguilar) is a 12th-century castle, one of the so-called Cathar castles, located in the commune of Tuchan in the Aude département of France.

== Architecture ==
The design of the castle is an example of the practical military thinking guiding 12th century architecture. The castle consists of an inner keep built in the 12th century, surrounded by an outer pentagonal fortification from the 13th century. This fortification is oriented such that its point guards the side most favourable to attackers. The keep and the inner hexagonal fortification is flanked at each corner with semi-circular guard towers, each equipped with archery outlooks. The strategic location of the castle on a hill overhanging the plain of Tuchan allows control and protection of the Corbières Massif. Despite this, the castle is easily accessible from the plains because of its relatively low elevation of 321 metres.

There is a small underground chapel of Saint-Anne below the keep.

== History ==
The earliest building at this location belonged to the count of Fenouillèdes since 1021. In the 13th century, the keep that had replaced earlier buildings was bequeathed by the viscounts of Carcassonne to their vassal, the Counts of Termes.

In 1210, it was invaded and occupied by Simon de Montfort, whose soldiers took and held the owner Raymond de Termes in a dark dungeon in the Carcassonne. In 1246, a royal garrison was installed to supervise the Aragon frontier. the castle was returned in 1250 to Olivier de Termes, the son of Raymond who had made peace with king Louis IX, for his good services during his crusade in the Holy Land. In October 1260, Olivier de Termes sold the castle to Louis IX, along with the villages of Termes, Davejean and Vignevieille.

Now on the border between the Kingdoms of France and Aragon, Tuchan experienced many skirmishes and battles during the following centuries. In 1525, the castle fell into the hands of a Spanish army. It is likely that the castle was then dismantled and not restored.

When the border was pushed back to the south of Roussillon by the treaty of the Pyrenées (1659), the castle gradually lost its strategic importance, and was eventually abandoned in 1659. Today it is in decrepit condition. Since 1949, it has been listed as a monument historique by the French Ministry of Culture. In July 2026, the Royal Capetian Fortresses of Languedoc (including this castle) were designated by UNESCO as a World Heritage Site.

== Pictures ==
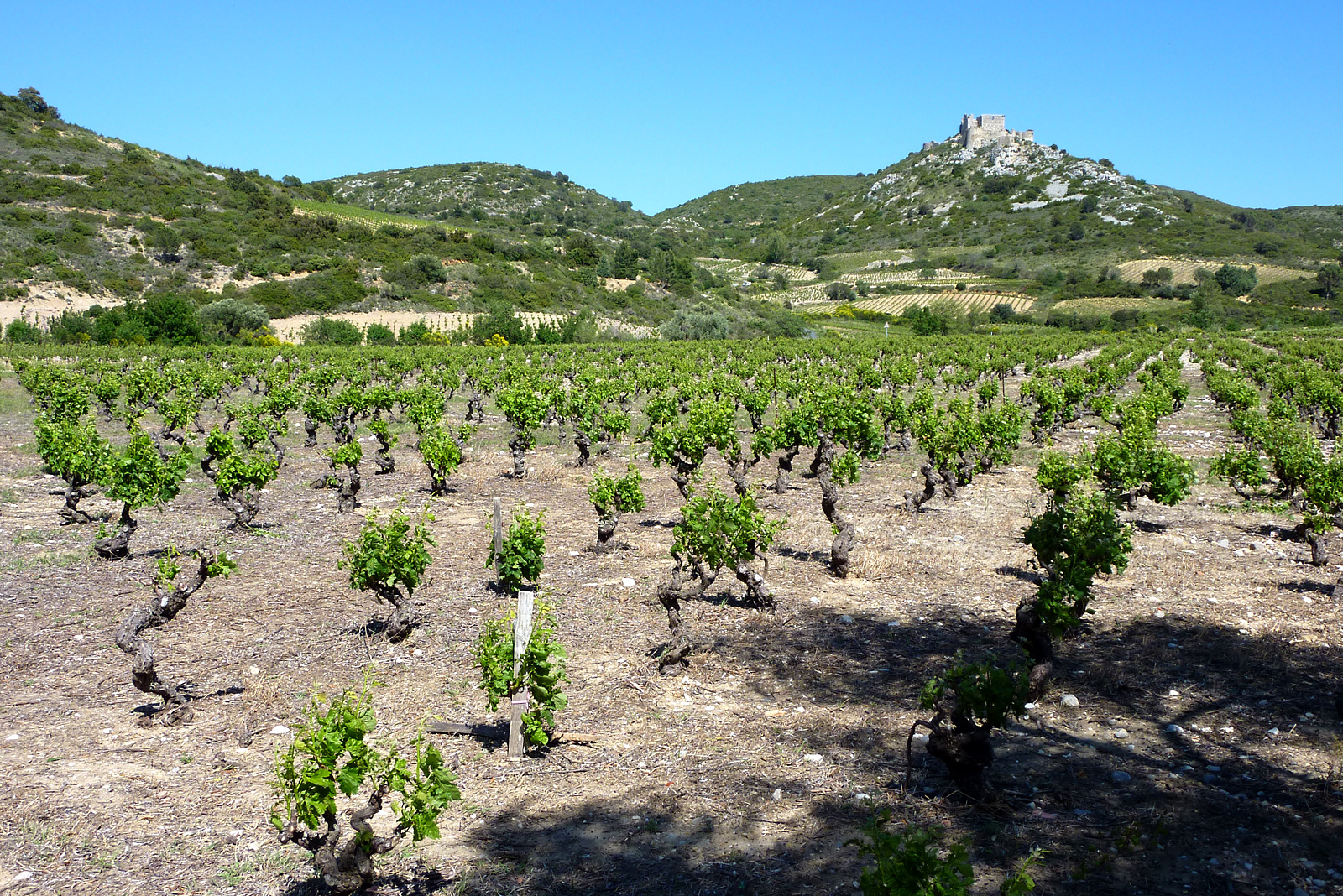
Château d'Aguilar

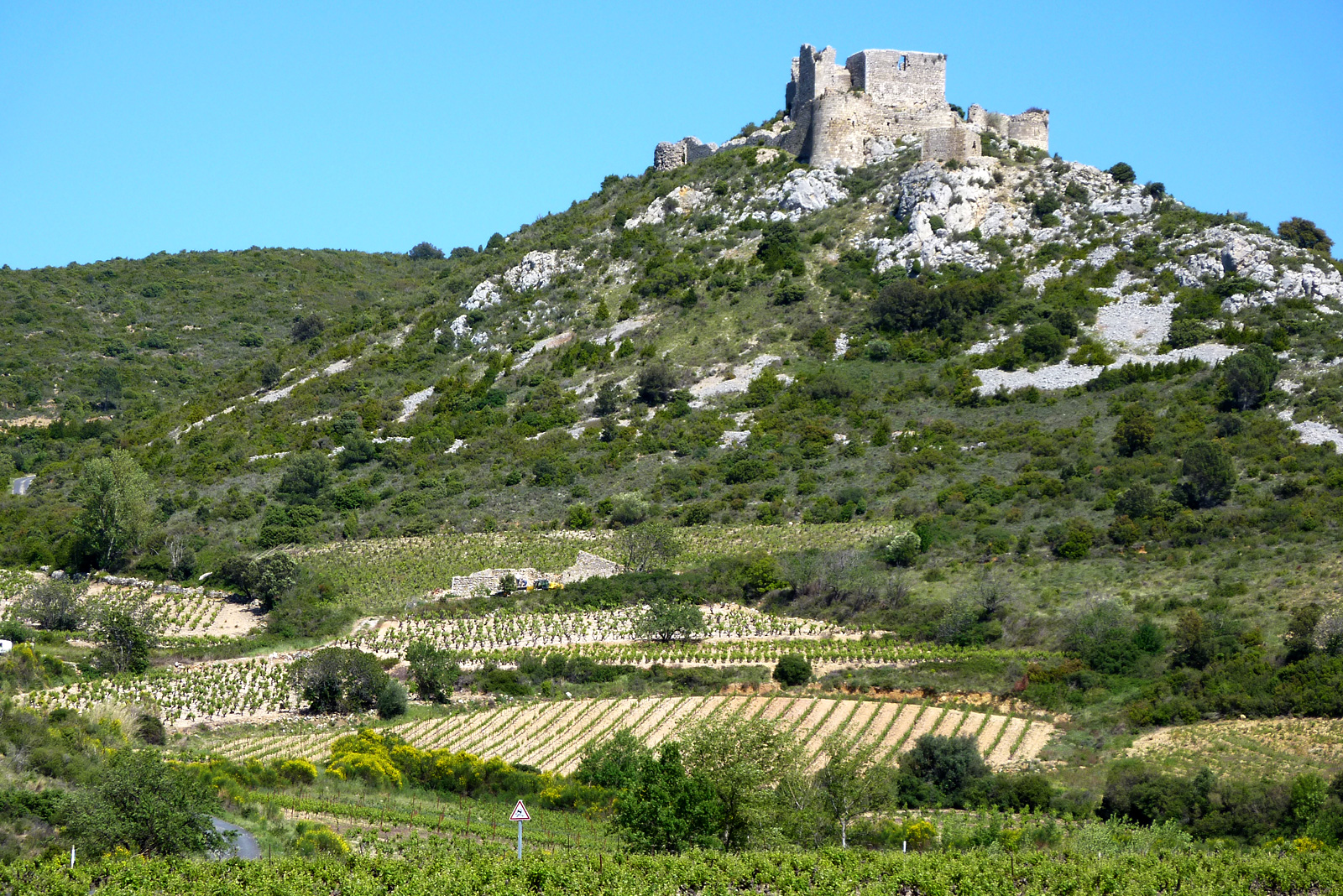
Château d'Aguilar

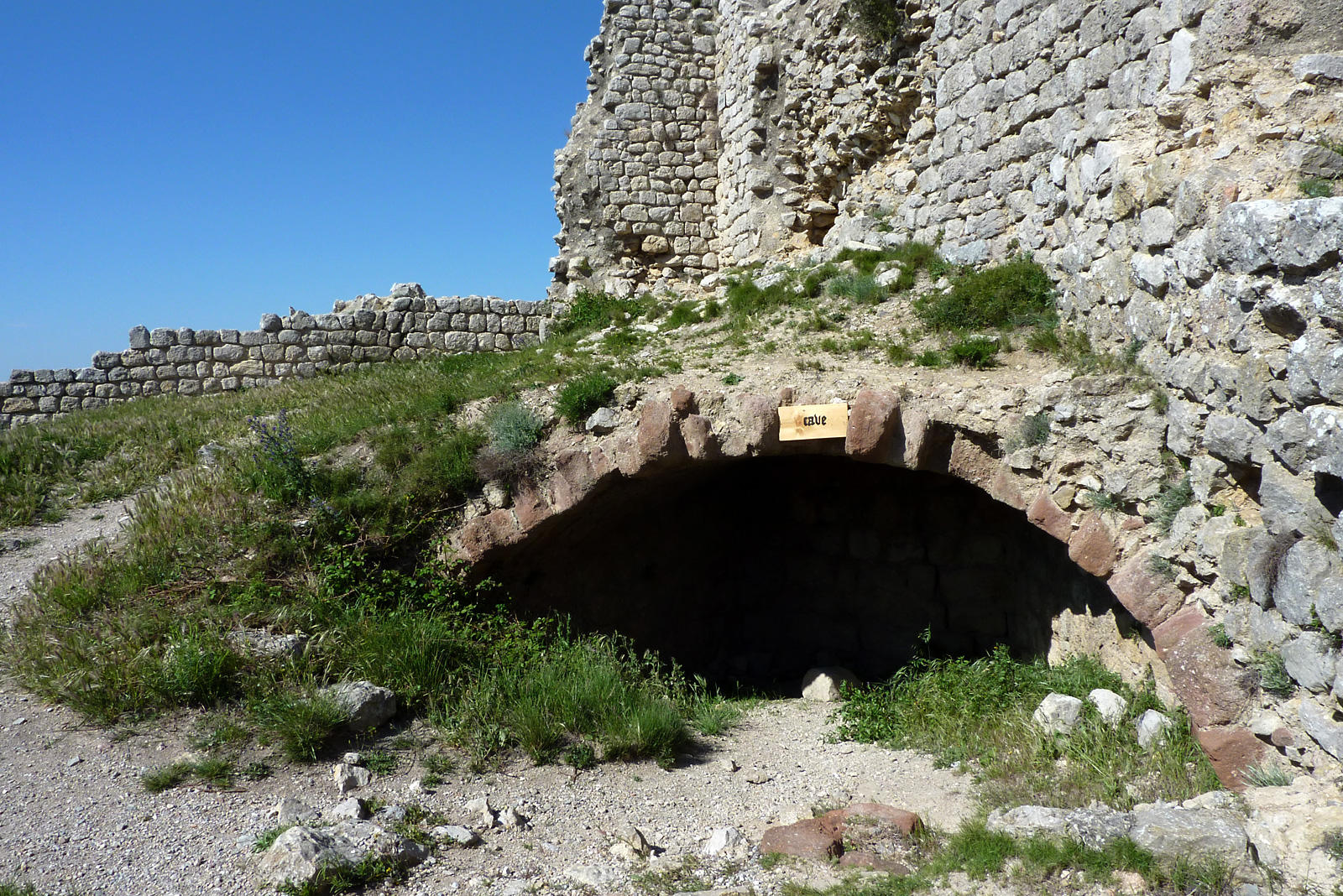
Château d'Aguilar

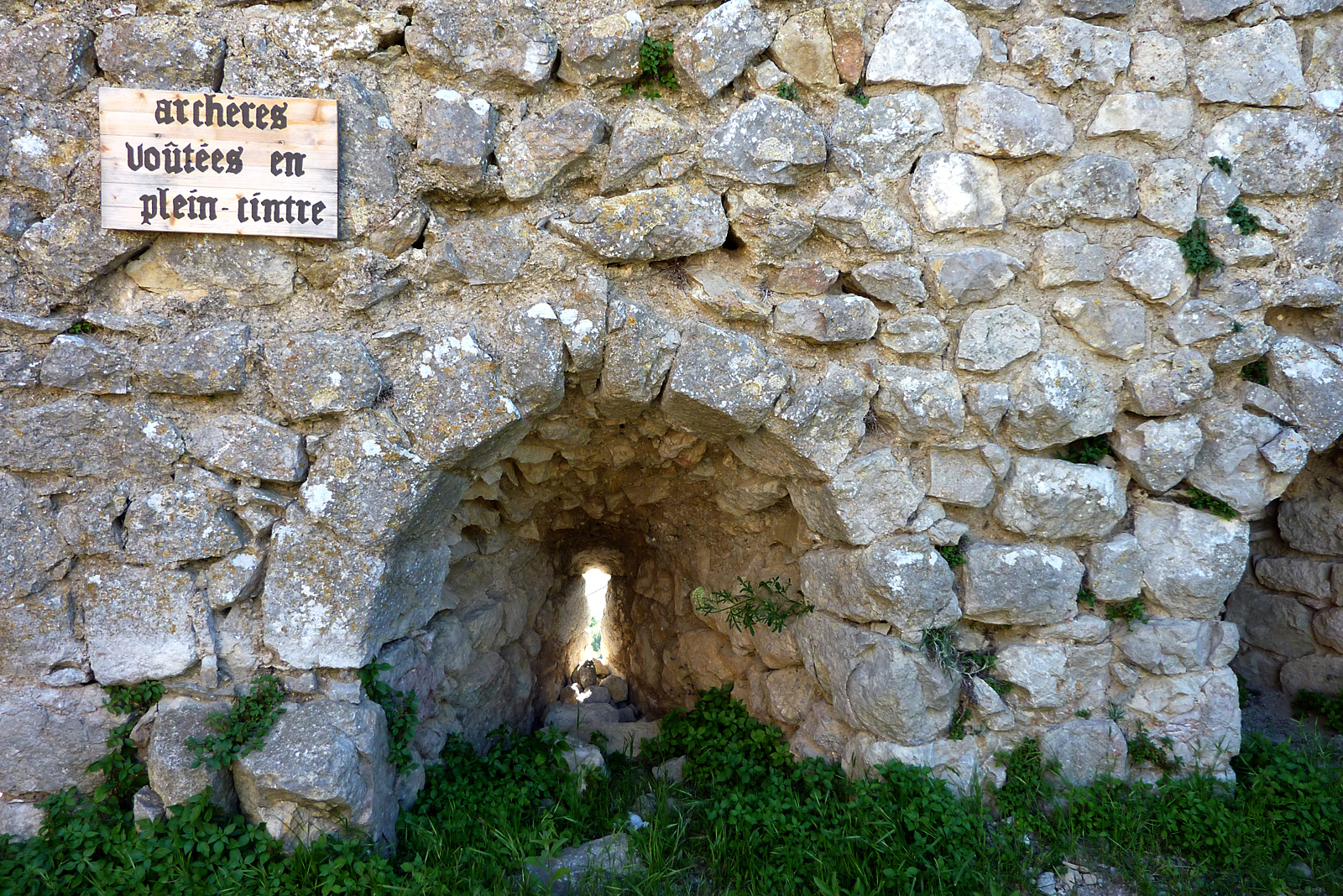
Château d'Aguilar

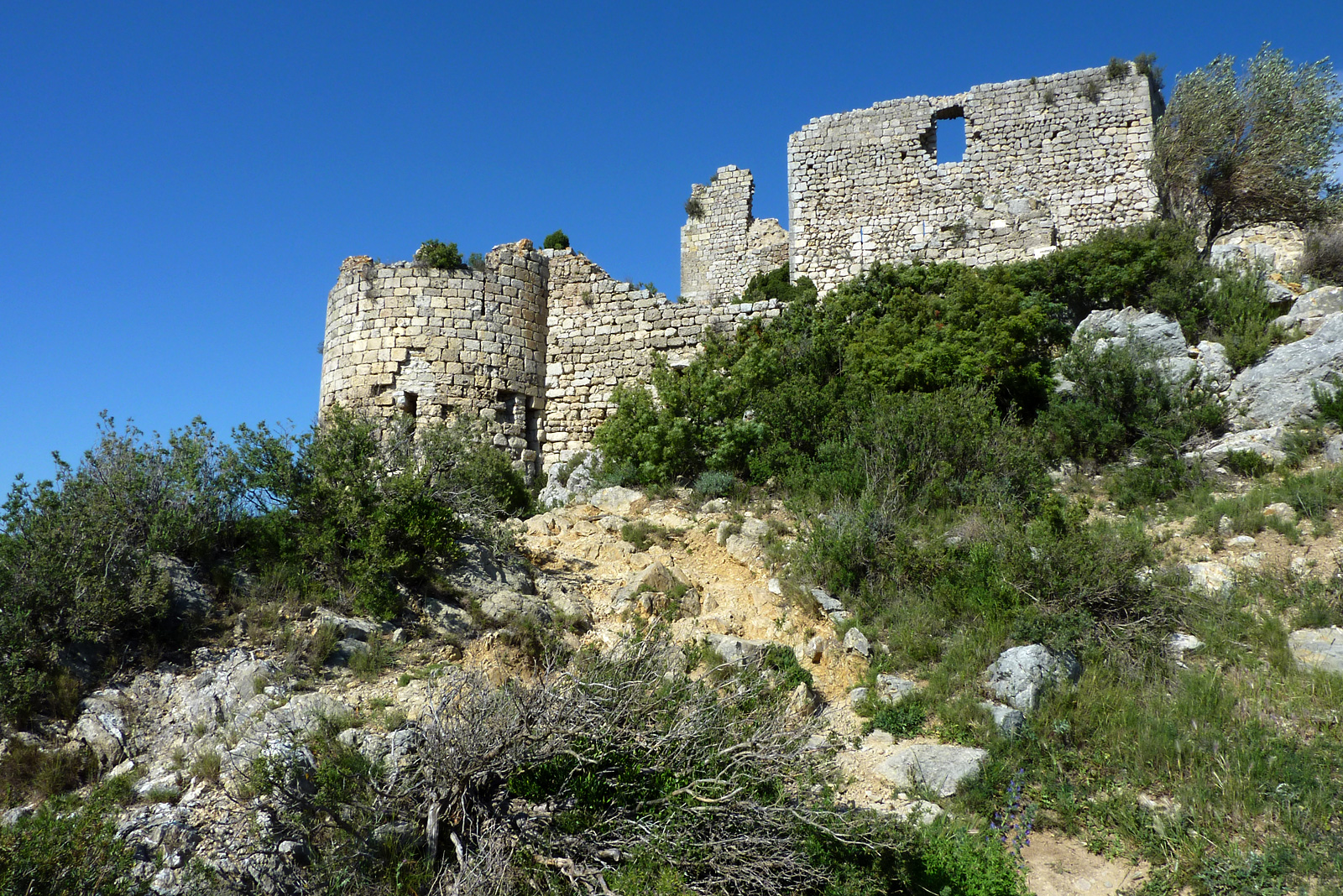
Château d'Aguilar

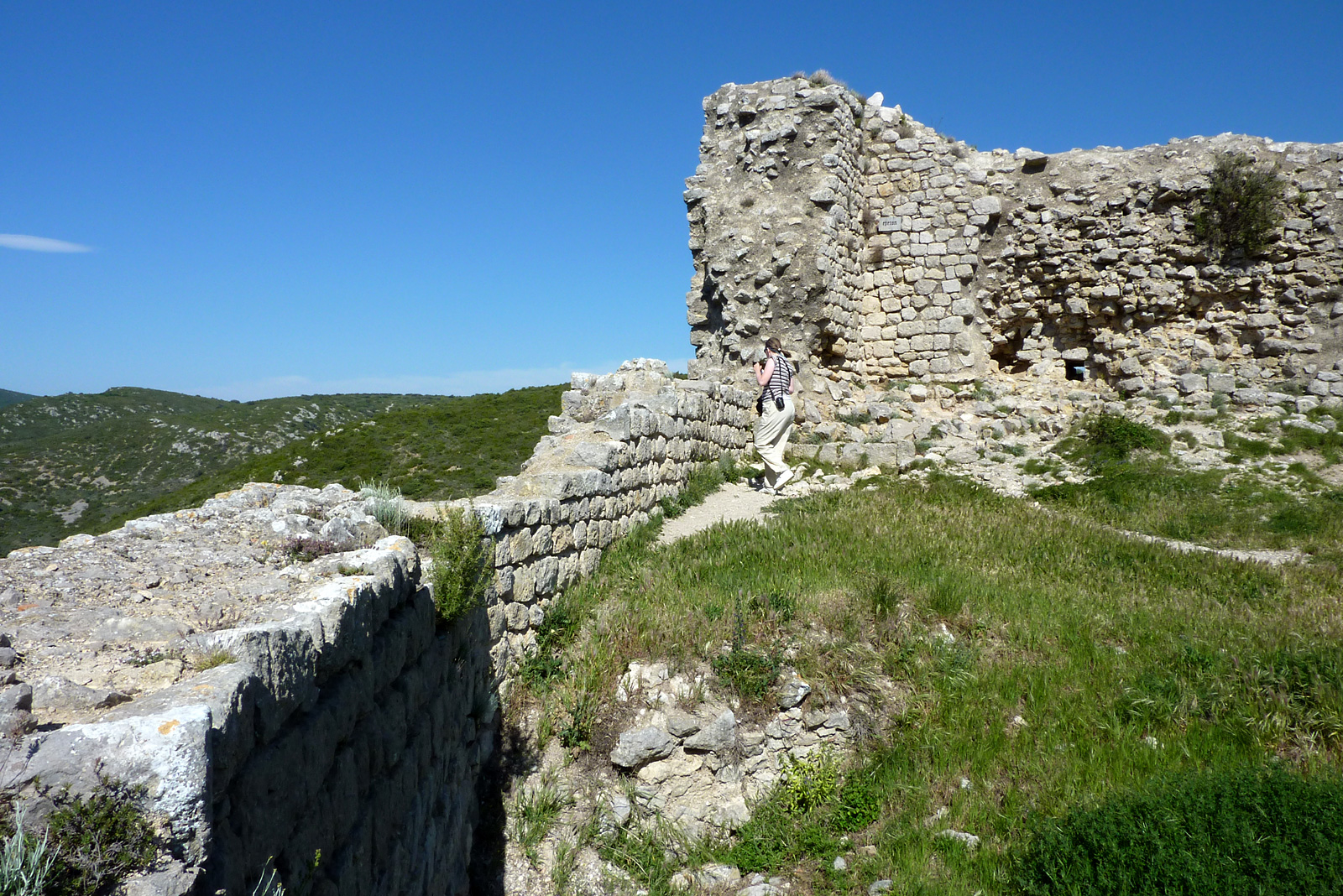
Château d'Aguilar

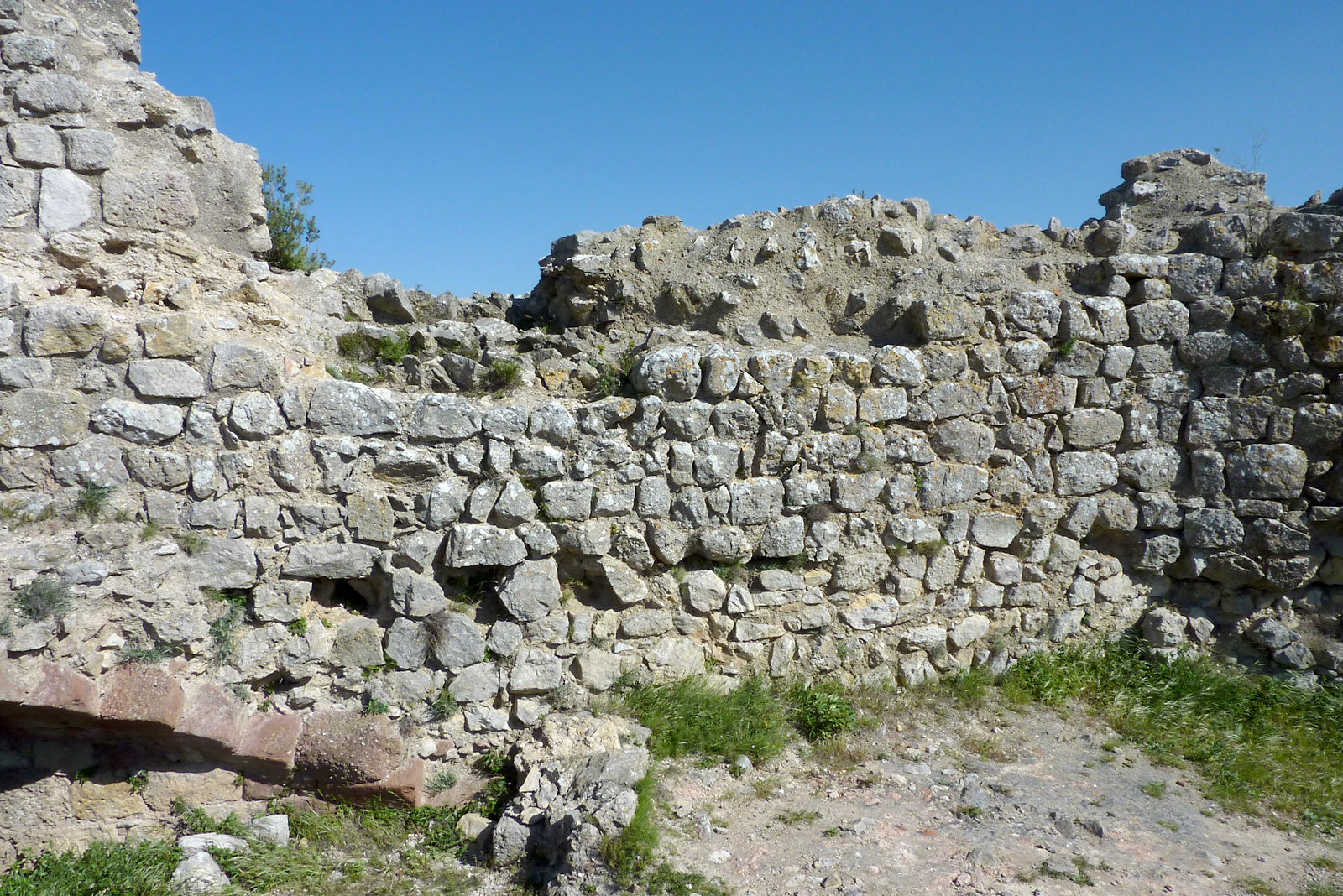
Château d'Aguilar

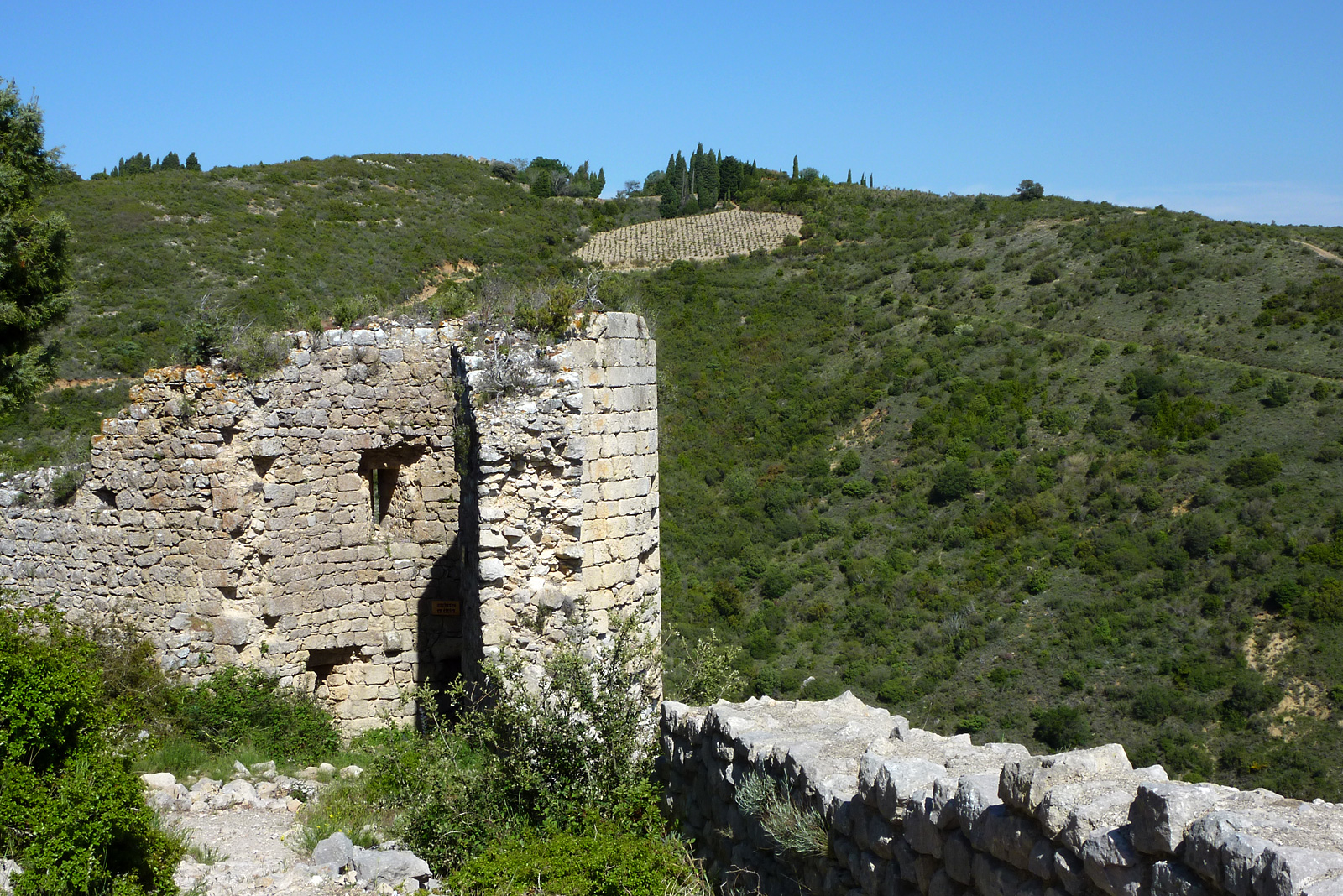
View from Château d'Aguilar to the Corbières

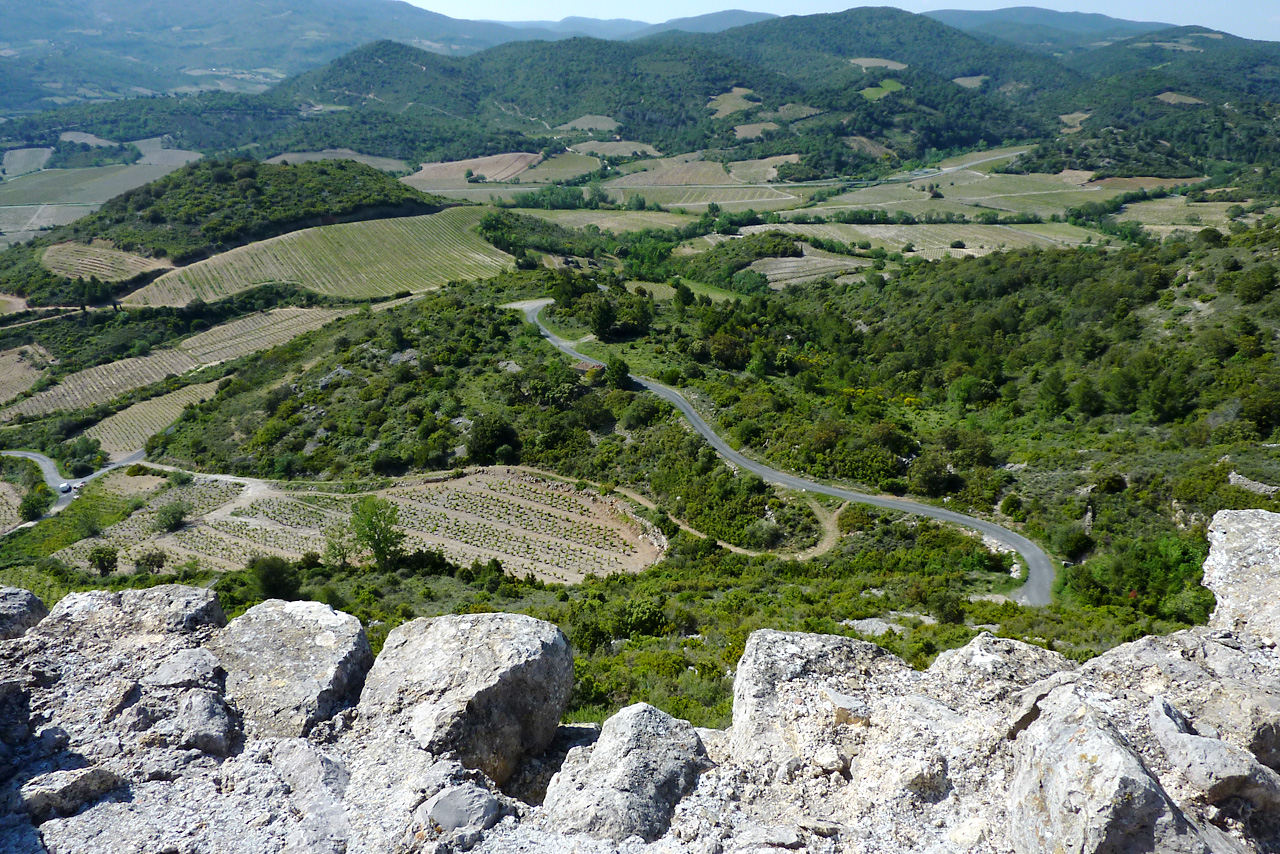
View from Château d'Aguilar to the Corbières

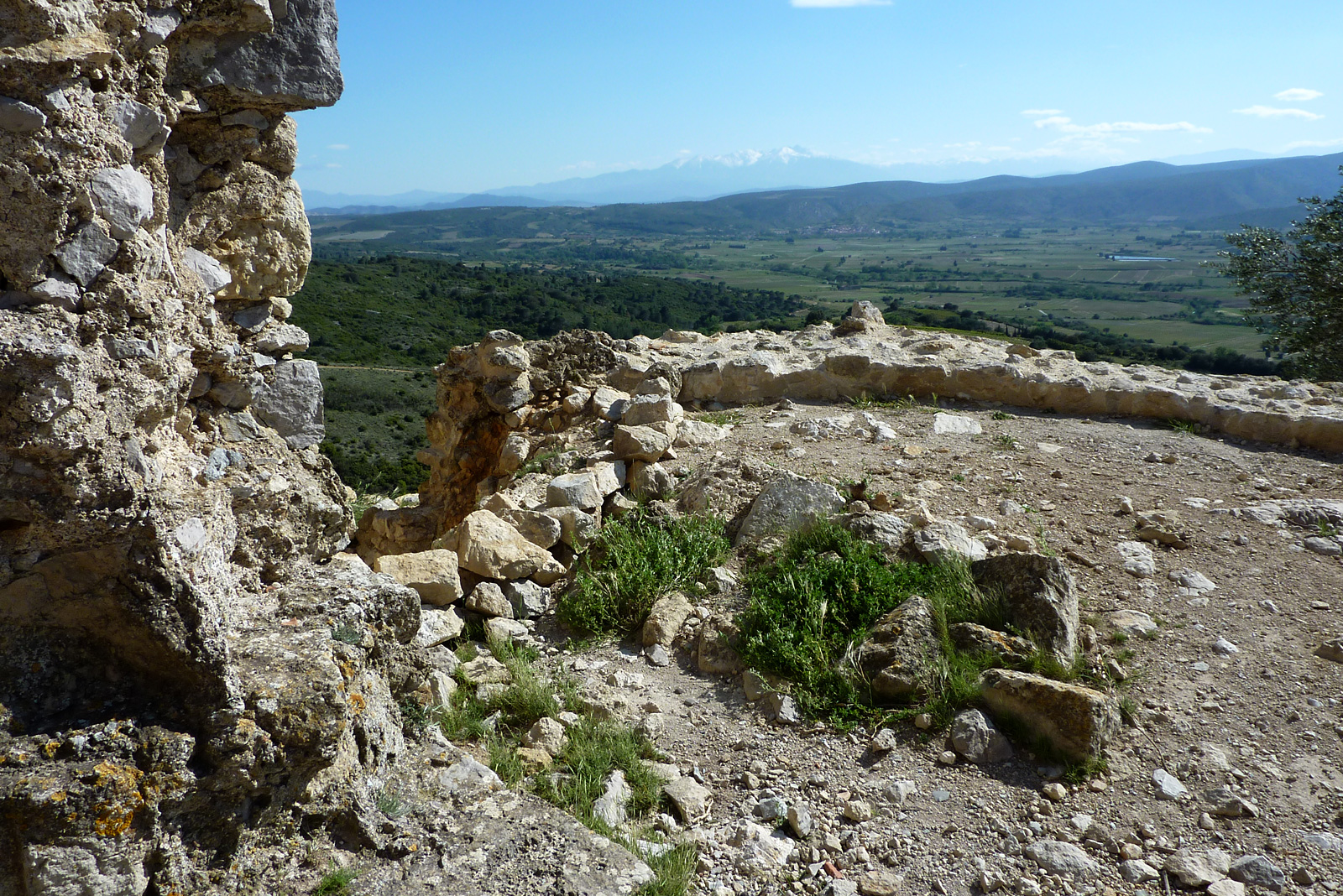
View from Château d'Aguilar to the Corbières, in the background the Pyrenees

== See also ==
- List of castles in France
