= Fenouillet, Pyrénées-Orientales =

Fenouillet Fenolhet (oc) - Fenollet (cat)
- Commune
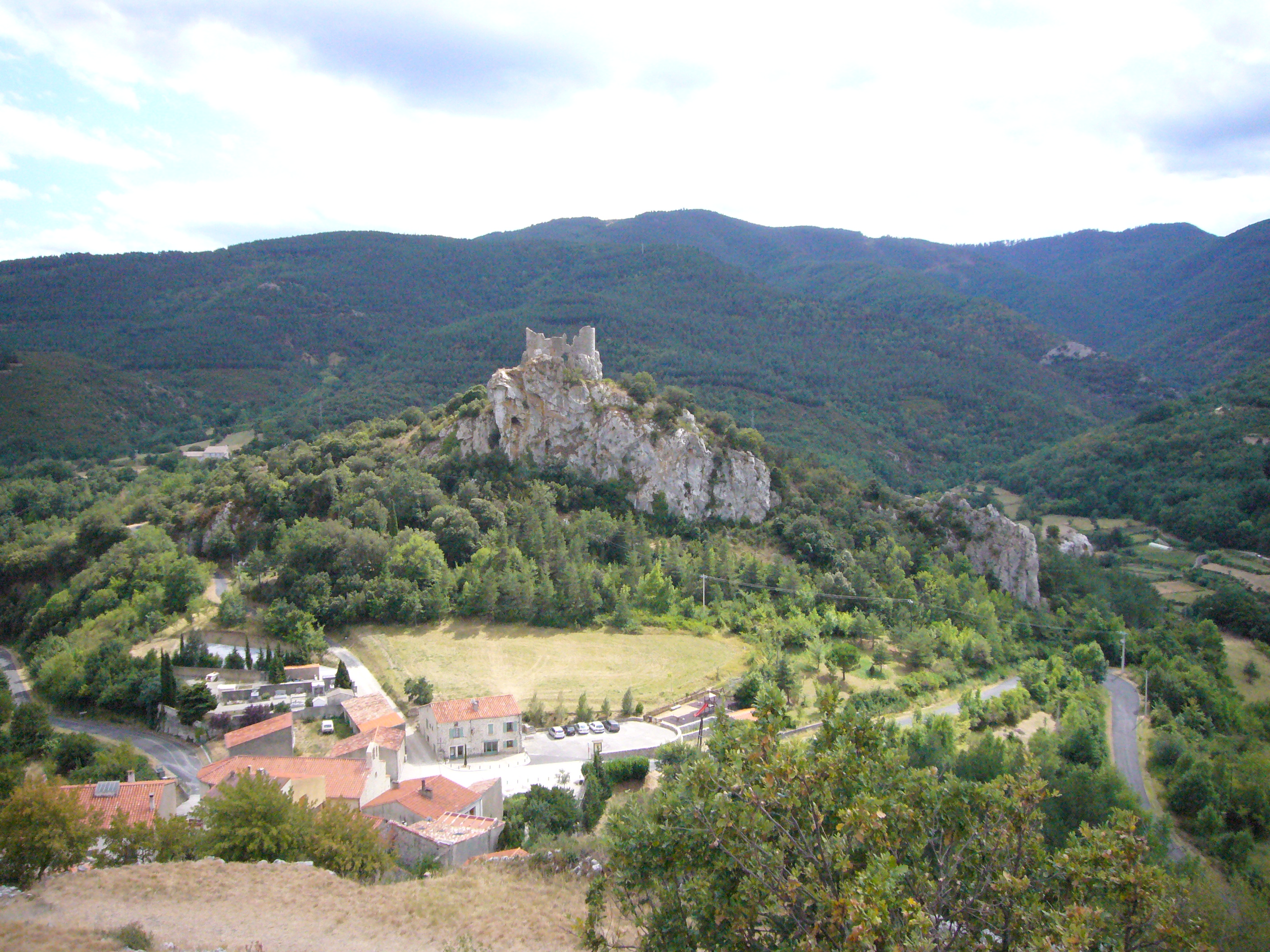
- Fenouillet and the Castel Sabarda

- Coat of arms
- Location of Fenouillet
- Location within France Location within Occitanie
- Coordinates: 42°47′36″N 2°22′52″E
- Country: France
- Region: Occitania
- Department: Pyrénées-Orientales
- Arrondissement: Prades
- Canton: La Vallée de l'Agly
- Intercommunality: Agly Fenouillèdes

Government
  - Mayor (2020–2026): Jean-Louis Raynaud
- Area^{1}: 18.76 km^{2} (7.24 sq mi)
- Elevation: 444 m (1,457 ft)
- Highest elevation: 1,208 m (3,963 ft)
- Lowest elevation: 373 m (1,224 ft)
- Population (2023): 100
  - Density: 5.3/km^{2} (14/sq mi)
- Time zone: UTC+01:00 (CET)
  - Summer (DST): UTC+02:00 (CEST)
- INSEE/Postal code: 66077 /66220
- ^{1} French Land Register data, which excludes lakes, ponds, glaciers > 1 km^{2} (0.386 sq mi or 247 acres) and river estuaries.

Fenouillet (French pronunciation: [fənujɛ]; Catalan: Fenollet; Occitan: Fenolhet) is a commune in the Pyrénées-Orientales department in southern France.

== Geography ==
Fenouillet is located in the canton of La Vallée de l'Agly and in the arrondissement of Perpignan.

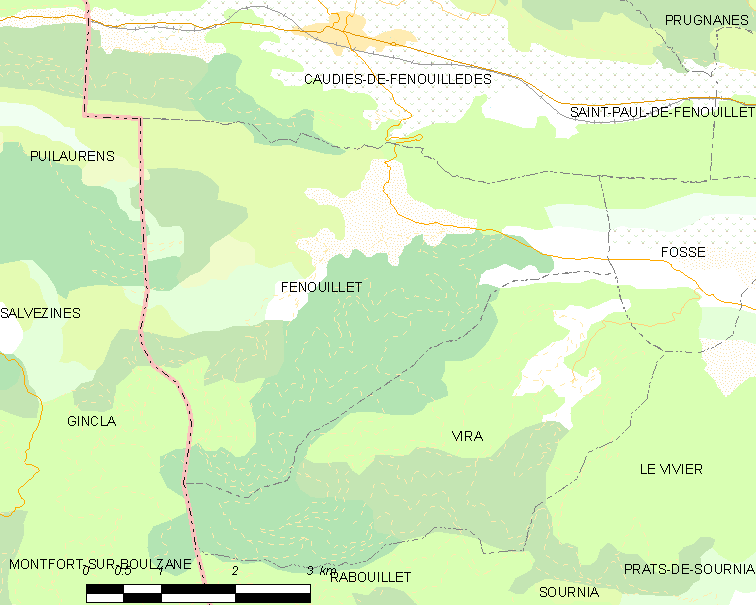
Map of Fenouillet and its surrounding communes

== Population ==
Historical population
| Year | Pop. | ±% p.a. |
|---|---|---|
| 1968 | 56 | — |
| 1975 | 45 | −3.08% |
| 1982 | 67 | +5.85% |
| 1990 | 76 | +1.59% |
| 1999 | 66 | −1.56% |
| 2007 | 84 | +3.06% |
| 2012 | 84 | +0.00% |
| 2017 | 89 | +1.16% |
| 2023 | 100 | +1.96% |
Source: INSEE

== Sites of interest ==
- The Château Vicomtal Saint-Pierre de Fenouillet is a ruined 11th century castle.

== See also ==
- Communes of the Pyrénées-Orientales department
