= Lavelanet =

Commune in Occitanie, France

- Commune
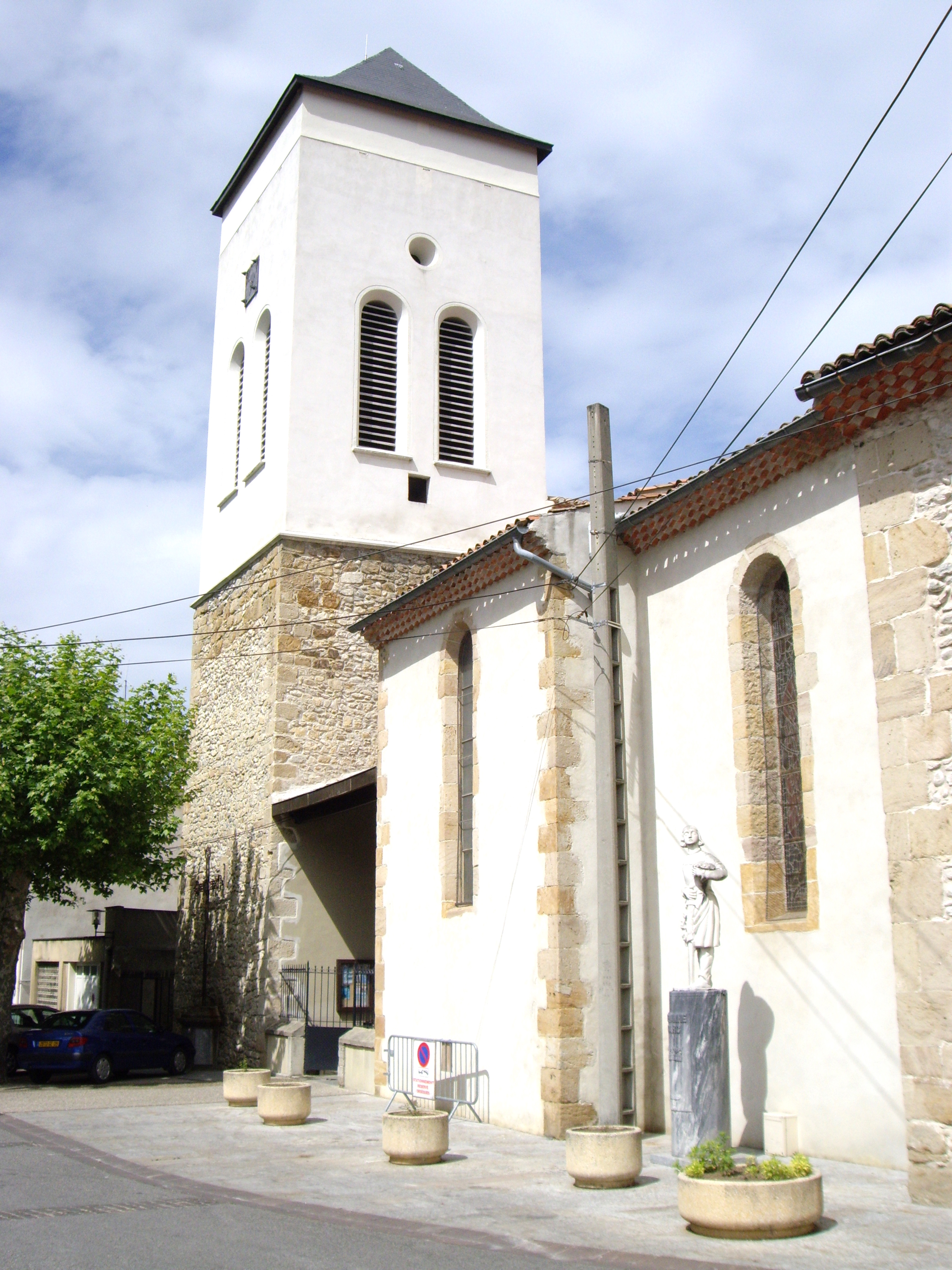
- The church in Lavelanet

- Coat of arms
- Location of Lavelanet
- Location within France Location within Occitanie
- Coordinates: 42°56′01″N 1°50′58″E
- Country: France
- Region: Occitania
- Department: Ariège
- Arrondissement: Pamiers
- Canton: Pays d'Olmes
- Intercommunality: Pays d'Olmes

Government
  - Mayor (2020–2026): Marc Sanchez
- Area^{1}: 12.57 km^{2} (4.85 sq mi)
- Elevation: 525 m (1,722 ft)
- Highest elevation: 802 m (2,631 ft)
- Lowest elevation: 490 m (1,610 ft)
- Population (2023): 5,987
  - Density: 476.3/km^{2} (1,234/sq mi)
- Time zone: UTC+01:00 (CET)
  - Summer (DST): UTC+02:00 (CEST)
- INSEE/Postal code: 09160 /09300
- ^{1} French Land Register data, which excludes lakes, ponds, glaciers > 1 km^{2} (0.386 sq mi or 247 acres) and river estuaries.

Lavelanet (French pronunciation: [lavlanɛ]; L'Avelhanet in the Languedocian dialect of Occitan) is a commune in the Ariège department in the Occitanie region in southwestern France.

== History ==
=== Prehistory and Antiquity ===
The Roman character of the subsurface constructions of the two towers of the ancient feudal castle of Lavelanet give Lavelanet a very ancient origin. A town must have existed before the Roman conquest because the Romans considered it appropriate to build fortifications in the gorge of the river Touyre. The name of the fortified castle "Castelsarrasin" also recalls the stay of the Moors in this area (this information being based on hypotheses).

The appearance of the first “drapery fullers” follows the arrival of the Phoenicians in the region; in fact for commercial purposes they teach the "natives" the art of textiles and the use of fuller's earth which abounds near Lavelanet, in exchange for gold, silver, resin, and the areas furs.

In 213, the emperor Caracalla had cargoes of cloth transported to Rome from Lavelanet.

=== Middle Ages ===
The primitive town of Lavelanet was located in the town of Bensa, a priory founded by the monks of Saint-Sernin of Toulouse in 9th century. The church of Bensa would be made up of two churches, one Carolingian from the 9th century, the other Romanesque from the 11th century. Due to the lack of writings, it is therefore a landmark in time for the primitive town of Lavelanet. In fact the first church was not large enough for the population, it was enlarged, today forming only one church called Saint-Sernin de Bensa à Lavelanet. The town of Lavelanet will appear at the foot of the fortified castle or "Castrum" named "Castelsarrasin", a castle that belonged to the Count of Foix. This castle was demolished in 1964.

Throughout the period of the Middle Ages and the modern era, the country of Olmes had a powerful corporation of clothier trimmers. The wool is worked in small spinning mills powered by the water of the river Touyre; weaving is done at home in the surrounding towns and countryside. Carts transported products to the fairs of Carcassonne, Toulouse, Bordeaux and Beaucaire, but the slowness of communications at the time and the distance from points of consumption prevents this industry from evolving.

In 1204, the mother of Raimond de Péreille, defender of Montségur and co-lord of Lavelanet, established a community of Cathars women there. The town of Lavelanet was born at the foot of the Castrum "Castelsarrasin". The current remains do not allow us to deduce either its size or its importance. Even if some wanted to see it as a real fortress, Lavelanet was probably a Castrum, that is to say a fortified village around a fortified house

This castle or Castrum was the property of the county of Foix. The county of Foix corresponded approximately to the Ariège basin and included two regions separated by the limestone barrier of the massif Plantaurel. It stood out for the individualism of its population, very attached to its counts, its freedoms and to Catharism which was very established in country of the Olmes.

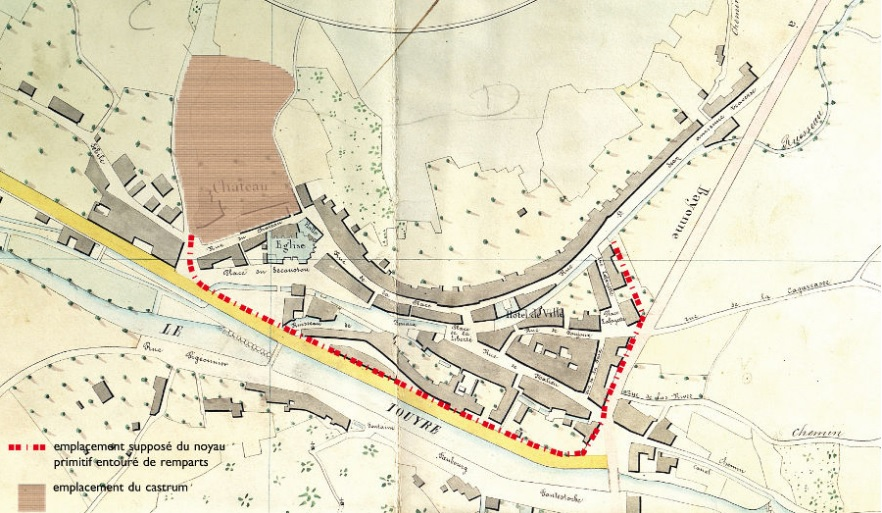
Location of the Castrum and the fortifications based on the Ponts et Chaussées plan in 1847. Departmental archives of Ariège.

The Albigensian Crusade of Simon de Montfort, 5th Earl of Leicester, a period which at the behest of Pope Innocent III and the Kingdom of France launching a crusade against the Cathar heresy, which was terrible for the region. In particular, the army of Simon de Montfort seized Béziers and massacred the entire population. Carcassonne in turn suffered a siege before being taken. During the years 1210 and 1211, the towns of Minerve, Termes and Puivert were taken by the crusaders. The castle, Castrum "Castelsarrasin" did not resist and was destroyed in 1212.

The Cistercian monk Pierre des Vaux de Cernay reports in his work History of the heresy of the Albigensians and the holy war against them (from the year 1203 to the year 1218): ".. Guy de Montfort, Lord of Sidon, brother of Simon de Montfort, the archbishop of Rhems, Robert was elected to the bishop of Laon, Guillaume, the archdeacon of Paris, and Enguerrand de Boua, to whom the leader of the crusaders had given part of the county of Foix. They stopped under the walls of a castle called Lavelanet. They soon took it by storm and put the inhabitants to the edge of the sword. Upon hearing of this sacking, the inhabitants of neighboring castles burned their own homes and sought shelter in the Châteaux de Montségur.

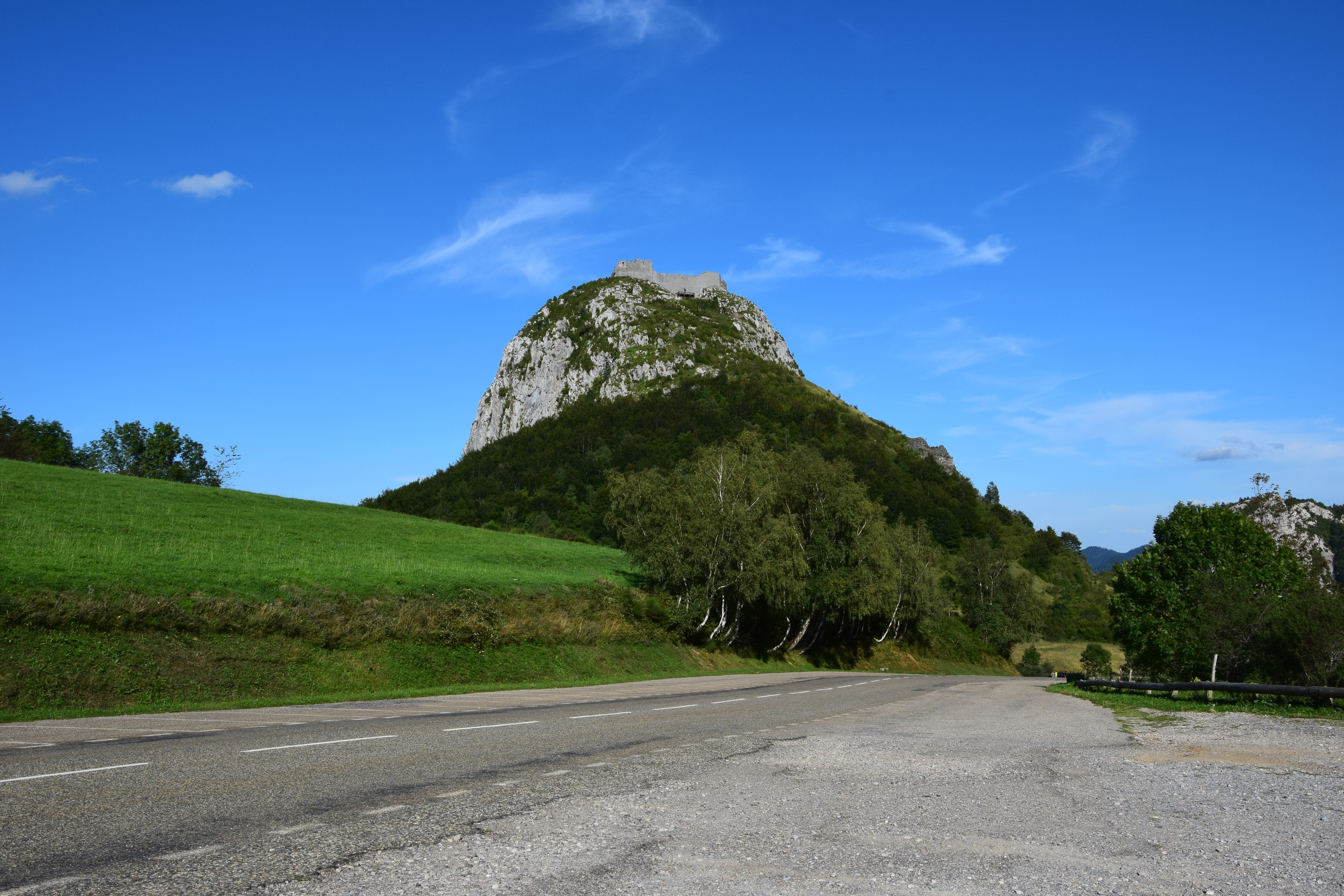
Château de Montségur.

Next to Lavelanet, the castle of Montségur underwent two siege attempts during this period: Guy de Montfort-Castres made a first unsuccessful attempt in 1212, his brother, Simon IV de Montfort, led the second in 1213 still without success.

The Treaty of Paris (1229) puts an end to the Albigensian Crusade and the community would become part of the lordship of Mirepoix in 1229. The lands of the Lavelanet area were confiscated by Simon IV de Montfort and Guy de Montfort-Castres and given to lieutenant Guy de Montfort, Lord of Sidon. The latter will seize all the lands of the Cathar lords from Mirepoix to Lavelanet. Based on the Treaty of Paris (1229), the House of Lévis was established in the region for seven centuries.

In his deposition before the Inquisition in 1244, Raymond de Péreille, lord of Montségur, explains that he "saw the Cathars publicly holding their houses in Lavelanet, with his ' consent and his will ».

== Population ==
Its inhabitants are called Lavelanetiens in French.

Historical population

| Year | Pop. | ±% p.a. |
|---|---|---|
| 1793 | 1,191 | — |
| 1800 | 1,222 | +0.37% |
| 1806 | 1,508 | +3.57% |
| 1821 | 1,717 | +0.87% |
| 1831 | 1,852 | +0.76% |
| 1836 | 2,527 | +6.41% |
| 1841 | 2,898 | +2.78% |
| 1846 | 3,004 | +0.72% |
| 1851 | 3,062 | +0.38% |
| 1856 | 2,944 | −0.78% |
| 1861 | 3,006 | +0.42% |
| 1866 | 3,033 | +0.18% |
| 1872 | 3,292 | +1.38% |
| 1876 | 3,095 | −1.53% |
| 1881 | 3,205 | +0.70% |
| 1886 | 3,246 | +0.25% |
| 1891 | 2,981 | −1.69% |
| 1896 | 3,179 | +1.29% |
| 1901 | 2,196 | −7.13% |

| Year | Pop. | ±% p.a. |
|---|---|---|
| 1906 | 3,270 | +8.29% |
| 1911 | 3,532 | +1.55% |
| 1921 | 3,608 | +0.21% |
| 1926 | 4,827 | +5.99% |
| 1931 | 4,849 | +0.09% |
| 1936 | 4,933 | +0.34% |
| 1946 | 5,541 | +1.17% |
| 1954 | 6,820 | +2.63% |
| 1962 | 7,648 | +1.44% |
| 1968 | 8,630 | +2.03% |
| 1975 | 9,346 | +1.15% |
| 1982 | 8,368 | −1.57% |
| 1990 | 7,740 | −0.97% |
| 1999 | 6,872 | −1.31% |
| 2007 | 6,727 | −0.27% |
| 2012 | 6,394 | −1.01% |
| 2017 | 6,137 | −0.82% |
| 2023 | 5,987 | −0.41% |

Source: EHESS and INSEE (1968-2023)

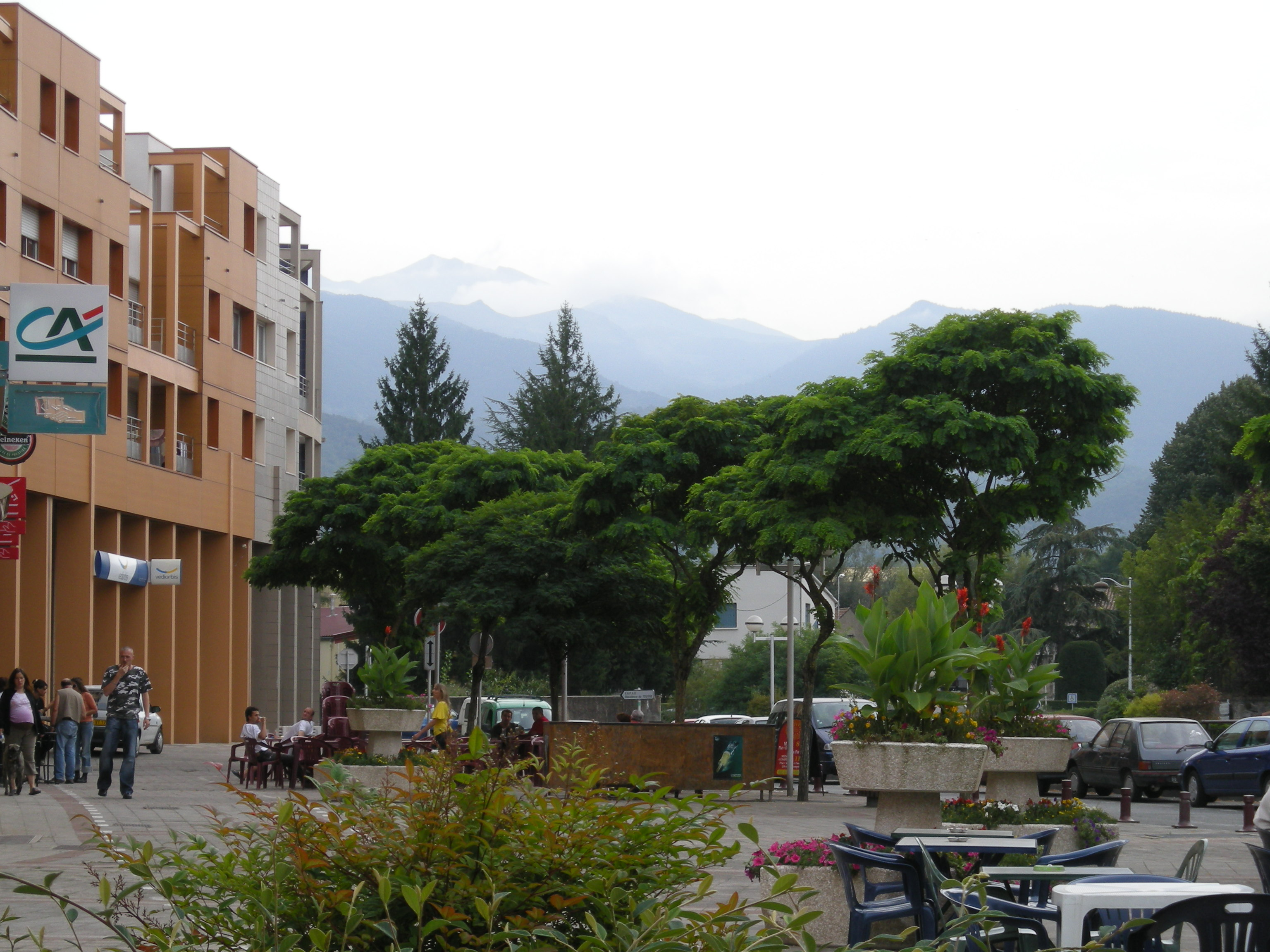
Place d'Europe

== Tour de France ==
In 2002 the 13th stage of the Tour de France started in Lavelanet.

In 2008 the 12th stage of the Tour de France started in Lavelanet.

== Etymology ==
The name of Lavelanet comes from the Latin avellana meaning "hazel nut" (French: noisette).

The city is commonly called Neout by the locals.

== Personalities ==
- Alix André (1909-2000), romance novelist
- Fabien Barthez, footballer
- Benoît Baby, rugby player
- Jean-Paul Banos and Jean-Marie Banos, fencers
- Perrine Laffont, mogul skier
- Daniel Lassalle, baroque trombonist

== See also ==
- Communes of the Ariège department
