= Arvigna =

Commune in Occitanie, France

- Commune
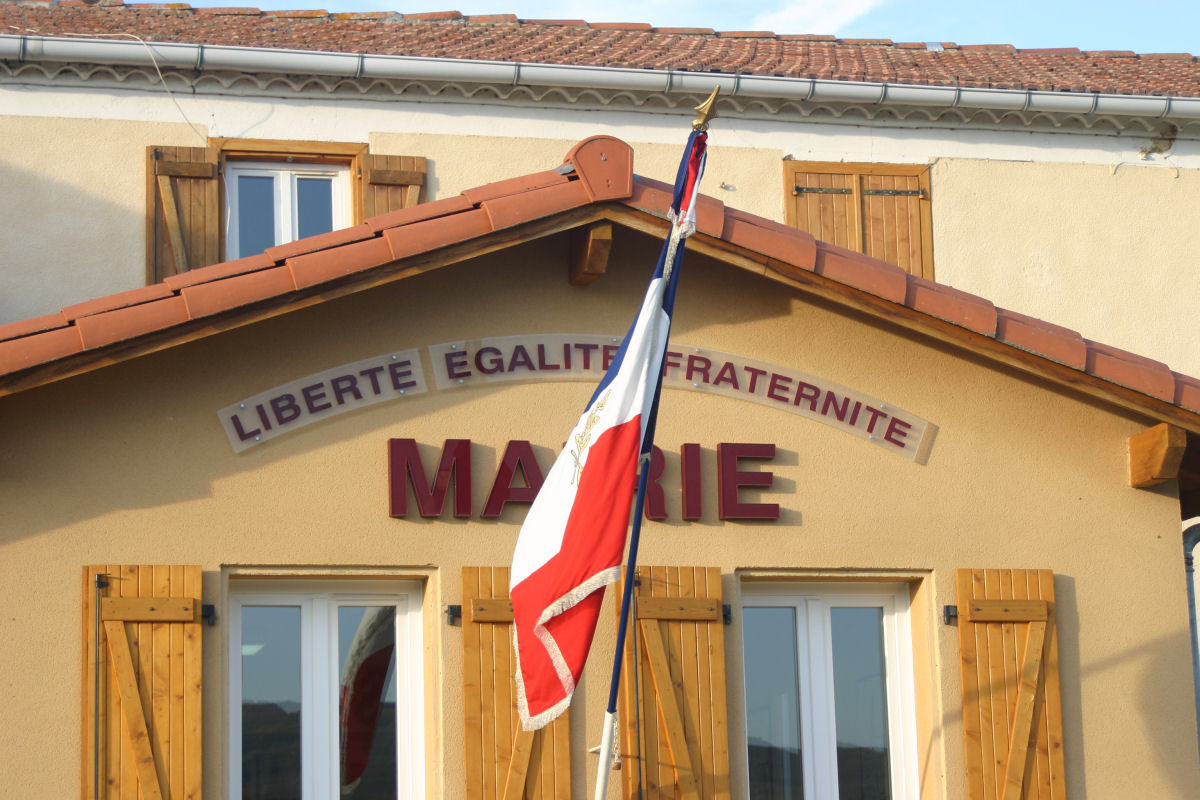
- Town hall

- Coat of arms
- Location of Arvigna
- Location within France Location within Occitanie
- Coordinates: 43°03′49″N 1°43′59″E
- Country: France
- Region: Occitania
- Department: Ariège
- Arrondissement: Pamiers
- Canton: Pamiers-2
- Intercommunality: CC Portes Ariège Pyrénées

Government
  - Mayor (2020–2026): Maxime Roubichou
- Area^{1}: 8.6 km^{2} (3.3 sq mi)
- Elevation: 650 m (2,130 ft)
- Highest elevation: 490 m (1,610 ft)
- Lowest elevation: 279 m (915 ft)
- Population (2023): 238
  - Density: 28/km^{2} (72/sq mi)
- Time zone: UTC+01:00 (CET)
  - Summer (DST): UTC+02:00 (CEST)
- INSEE/Postal code: 09022 /09100
- ^{1} French Land Register data, which excludes lakes, ponds, glaciers > 1 km^{2} (0.386 sq mi or 247 acres) and river estuaries.

Arvigna (French pronunciation: [aʁvinɑ̃]; Occitan: Arvinhan) is a commune in the Ariège department in the Occitanie region of southwestern France.

== Geography ==
Arvigna is a commune in the Pre-Pyrenees located some 11 km south-east of Pamiers and 12 km west by south-west of Mirepoix. Access to the commune is by the D12 road from Vira in the south-west passing through the commune east of the village and continuing to join the D119 north of the commune. There are extensive forests in the commune covering about 40% of the land area with the rest farmland.

The Douctouyre river flows along the edge of the forests in the north-east of the commune from south-east to north and it continues north to join the Hers near Vals. Four streams rise in the commune and flow north-east to join the Douctouyre in the commune - the Ruisseau de Lafage, the Ruisseau de Truffet, an unnamed stream, and the Ruisseau de Minguet. The western border is delineated by an unnamed stream which flows north to join Le Canal south of Saint-Amadou.

=== Places and Hamlets ===
The population is mostly split between four hamlets (Languit, Menet, Roubichou, les Bordes) which are scattered around the Town hall and the school. The church is on the slopes of Cantegril hill above Arvigna village. There are eight other hamlets in the commune:

- Le Castel
- Marty
- Minguet
- Monge
- Peres
- Le Pioy
- La Rose
- Le Soula
- En Terraine

=== Heraldry ===
Arms of Arvigna	Blazon: Or, 3 chevrons of Sable debruised by a castle Gules towered at centre turreted port open, windowed and masoned in Sable, bordure in Vert.

== Administration ==
List of Successive Mayors

From	To	Name	Party	Position
1965	1977	Georges Chaubet	SE	
1977	1987	Pierre Naudi	SE	Farmer
1987	1995	André Jalibert	SE	Farmer
1995	2008	Jacques Mirouse	PS	Retired
2008	2020	Jean-François Naudi	SE	Farmer
2020	2026	Maxime Roubichou		

== Demography ==
The inhabitants of the commune are known as Arvignais or Arvignaises in French.

Historical population

Year	Pop.	±% p.a.
1793	375	—
1821	420	+0.41%
1846	394	−0.26%
1872	350	−0.45%
1901	272	−0.87%
1926	202	−1.18%
1946	174	−0.74%
1962	146	−1.09%
1968	132	−1.67%

Year	Pop.	±% p.a.
1975	127	−0.55%
1982	154	+2.79%
1990	149	−0.41%
1999	156	+0.51%
2007	187	+2.29%
2012	233	+4.50%
2017	223	−0.87%
2023	238	+1.09%

Source: EHESS and INSEE

== Sites and Monuments ==
There are four structures registered as historical monuments in Arvigna. These are:

- War memorial (20th century). This memorial is located inside the walls of the church.
- Funeral Chapel of the Barrière family (19th century)
- Wayside Cross at Roubichou (1813)
- Parish Church of Saint-Vincent and Saint-Martial (14th century).

The Church of Saint-Vincent and Saint-Martial contains many items that have been registered as historical objects. These are:

- Funeral Cross of Father Louis Richard (20th century)
- Cemetery Cross (19th century)
- The surroundings of the war memorial including the large statues of Saint Joan of Arc and Saint Germaine of Pibrac with their Corbels (20th century)
- 2 Altar Towers (19th century)
- Cape and Cloth of Gold (19th century)
- 4 sides of the processional dais (19th century)
- Exhibition veil of the sacramental saint: IHS (19th century)
- Processional banner: Baby Jesus blessing the world (19th century)
- Baptismal fonts and a sculpture of the baptism of Christ (19th century)
- Secondary Altar of the Virgin, Altar tombstone, Altar seating, Tabernacle, and small statue: Virgin of the Sacred Heart (19th century)
- Harmonium (19th-20th century)
- Main Altar, Altar tombstone, Altar seating, and Tabernacle (19th century)
- Collection plate (17th century)
- Stoup: 3 anthropomorphic heads (17th century)
- Stoup (on a footing) (17th century)
- Family pew (19th century)
- Sacristy furniture (17th century)
- 4 Funeral candlesticks (19th century)
- Altar Cross: Christ on the cross (17th century)
- Chalice with its Paten (20th century)
- Solar Monstrance (19th century)
- Mortuary cloth: with deaths-heads insignia (19th century)
- Mortuary cloth (19th century)
- Aube (19th century)
- Paddle: IHS (19th century)
- Paddle: IHS (18th century)
- Statuette: Virgin and child (18th century)
- Pair of paintings: Saint Vincent and Saint Martial (19th century)
- Altar table with its frame: Calvary St. Peter and St. Martial (17th century)
- 4 Stained glass windows (19th century)
- The Church furniture
- 4 paintings on the processional dais (19th century)
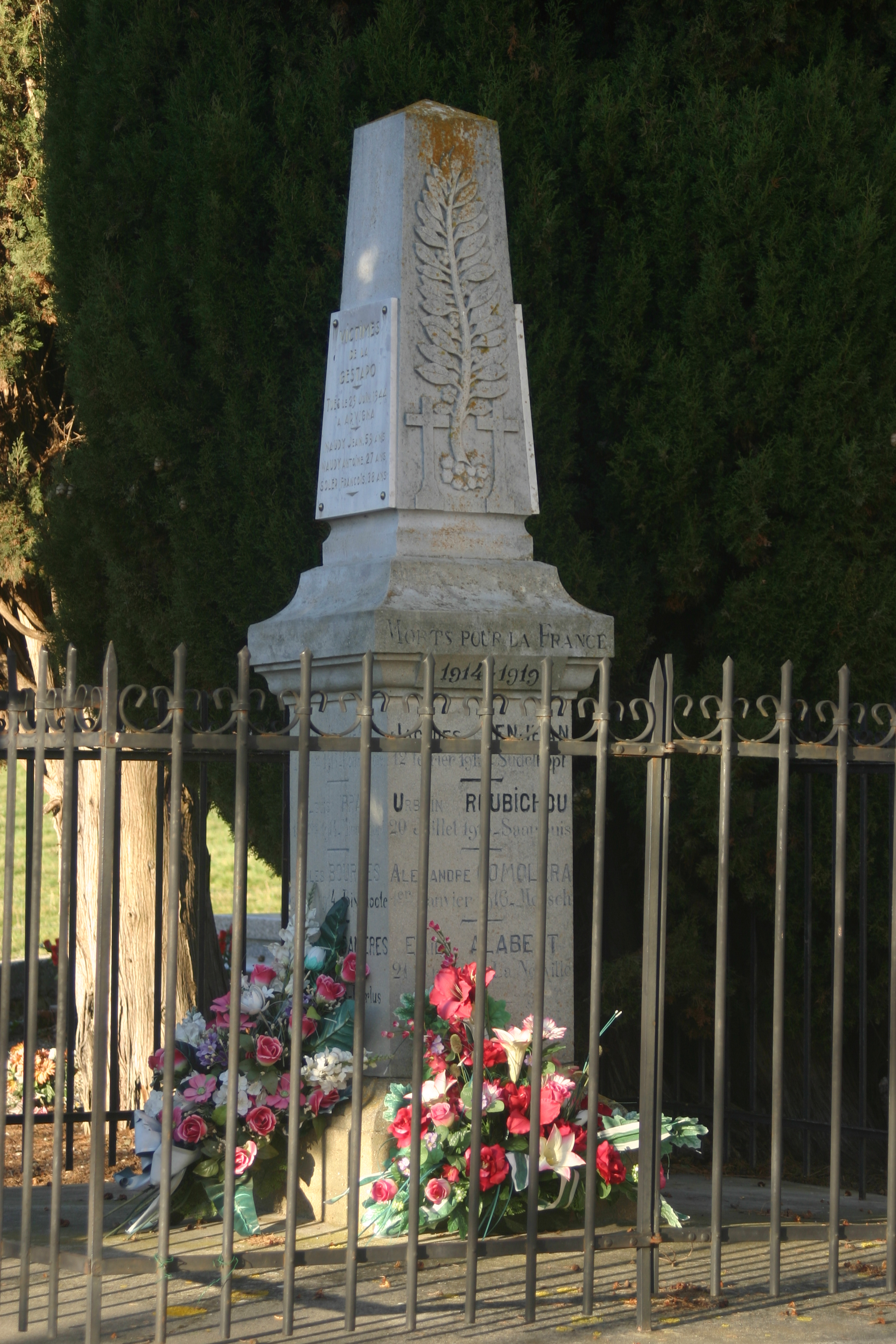
War memorial

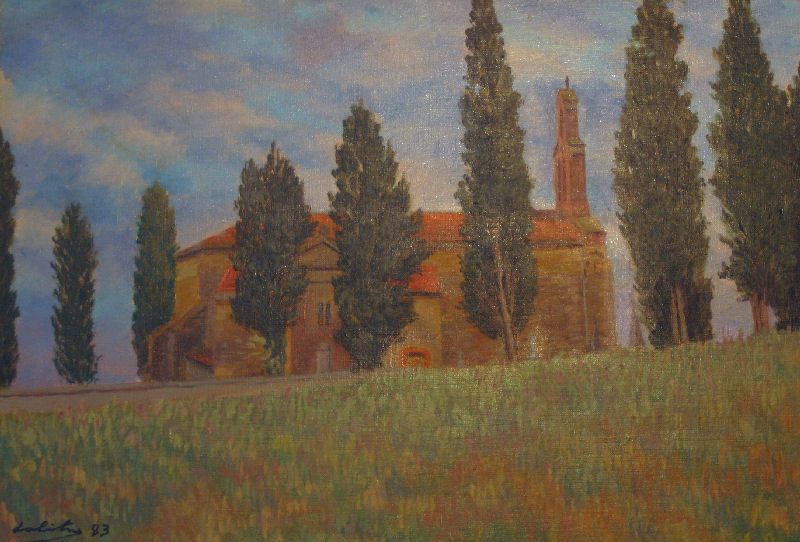
The Church of Arvigna painted by R. Labitrie (1983)

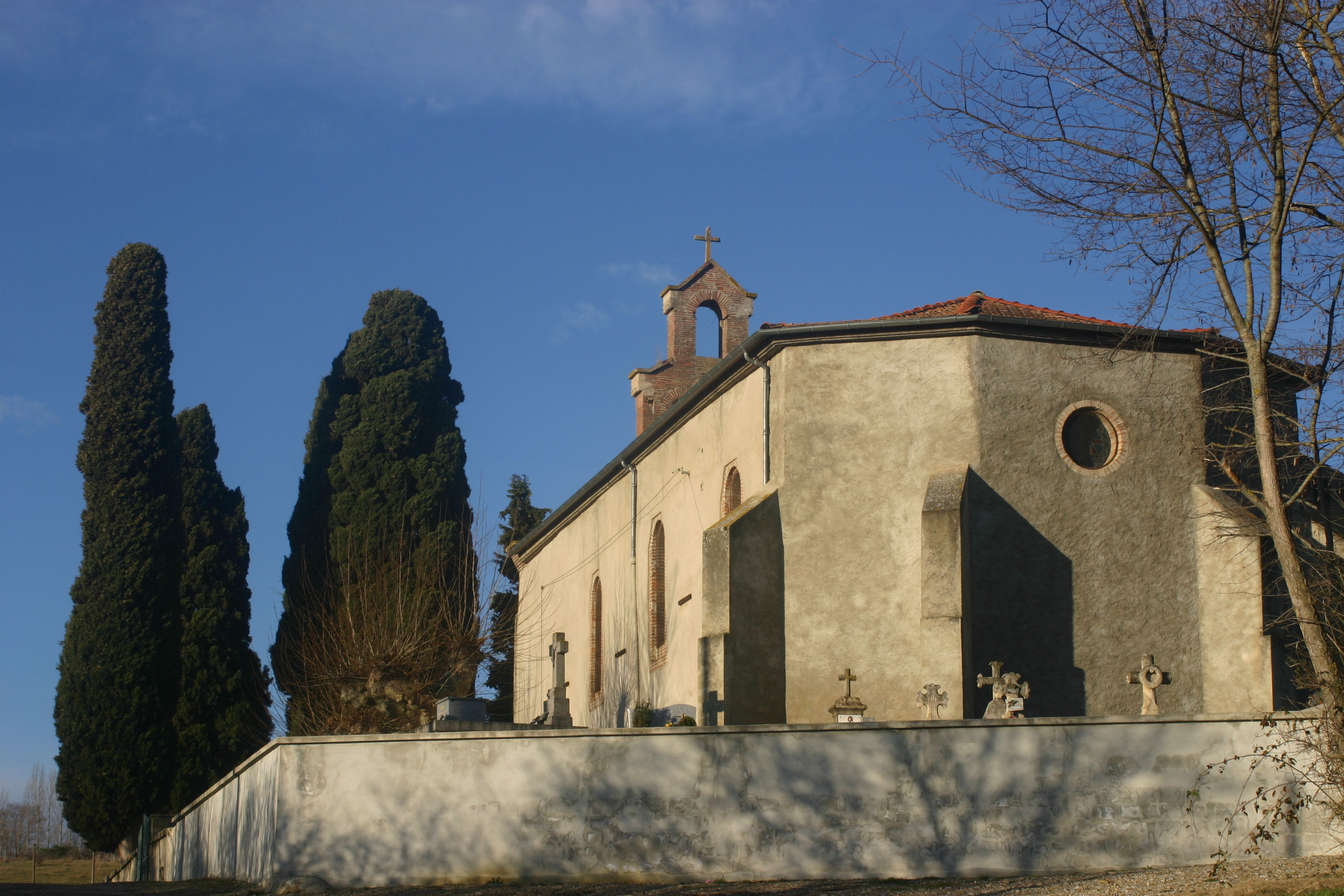
The fortified Church

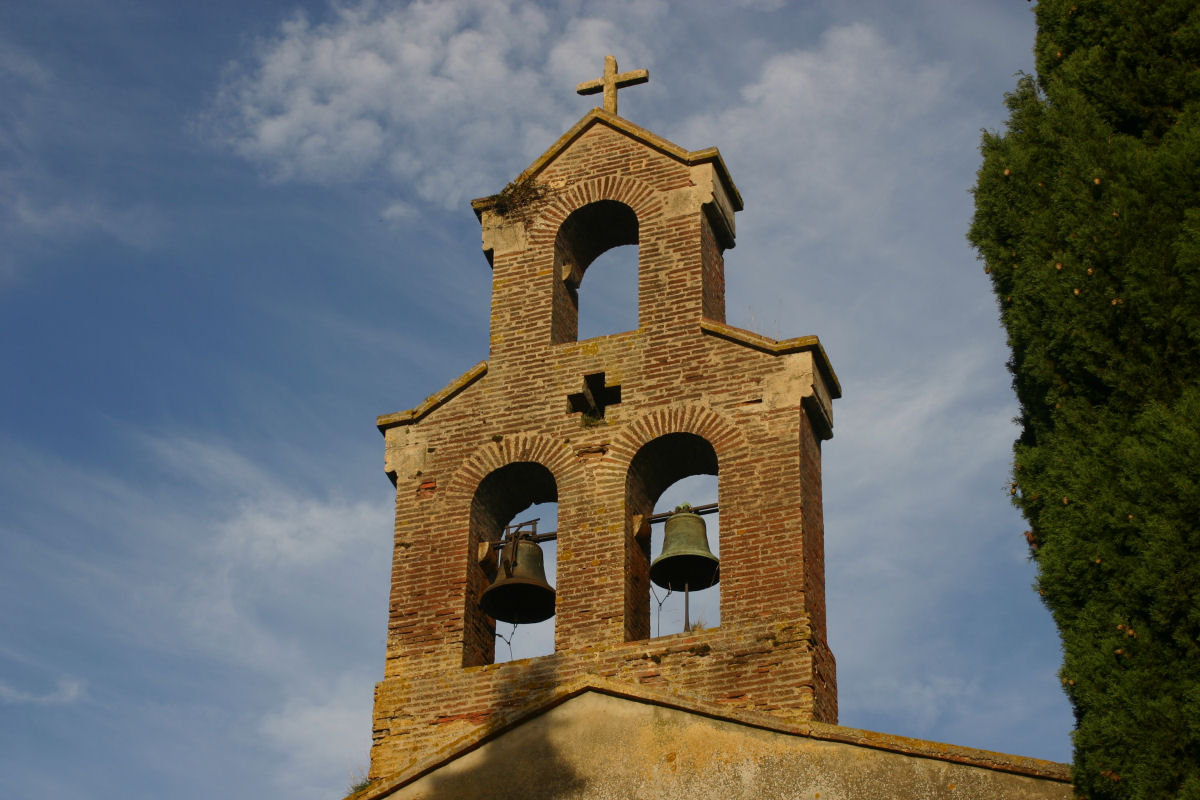
The Bell tower of the church

== Local life, tourism and associations ==
=== Local life ===
School: an inter-communal educational grouping (RPI) for the Douctouyre Valley groups together the communes of Arvigna, Calzan, Vira, [Dun], Lieurac, and Carla-de-Roquefort. Five classes are open, including one at Arvigna with a canteen service and a CLAE. There is a leisure centre that operates on Wednesdays and during the holidays at Dun.

=== Tourism ===
There are two rural Gîtes (apartments), a Hiking or Mountain bike trail 7 km long trail which is an Earth Society (maquisards and guerrillas) path starting from the hamlet of Minguet to the site of a former Cathar castle (not restored).

=== Associations ===
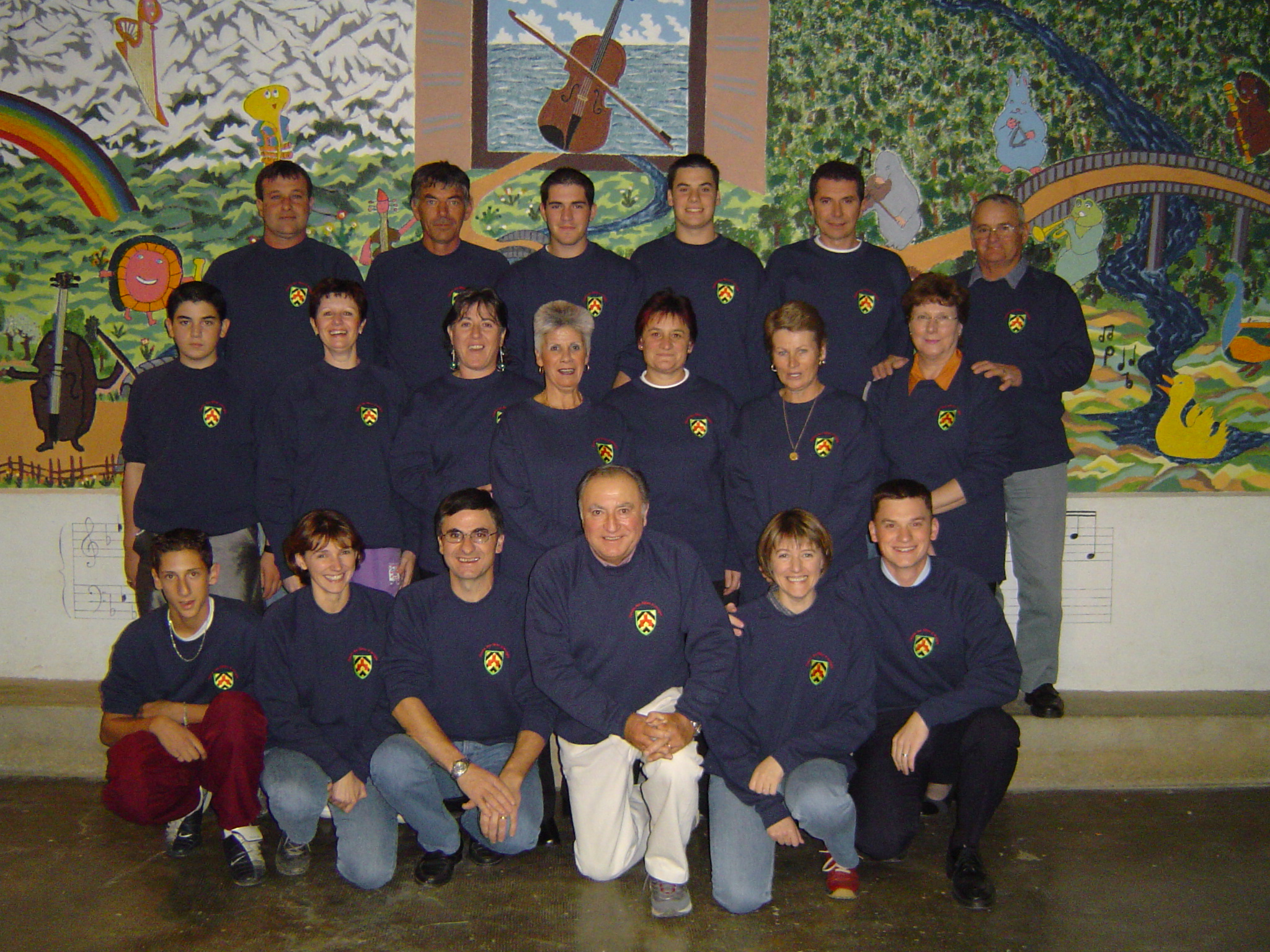
The Festival Committee of Arvigna

- The Festival Committee organises various annual events, local festivals and fireworks. It includes many people from the commune and elsewhere, young and old.
- Hunting Association
- Walking group: Les Caminaïres

== See also ==
- Communes of the Ariège department
