= Siege of Montségur =

1243 battle of the Albigensian Crusade

- Part of Albigensian Crusade
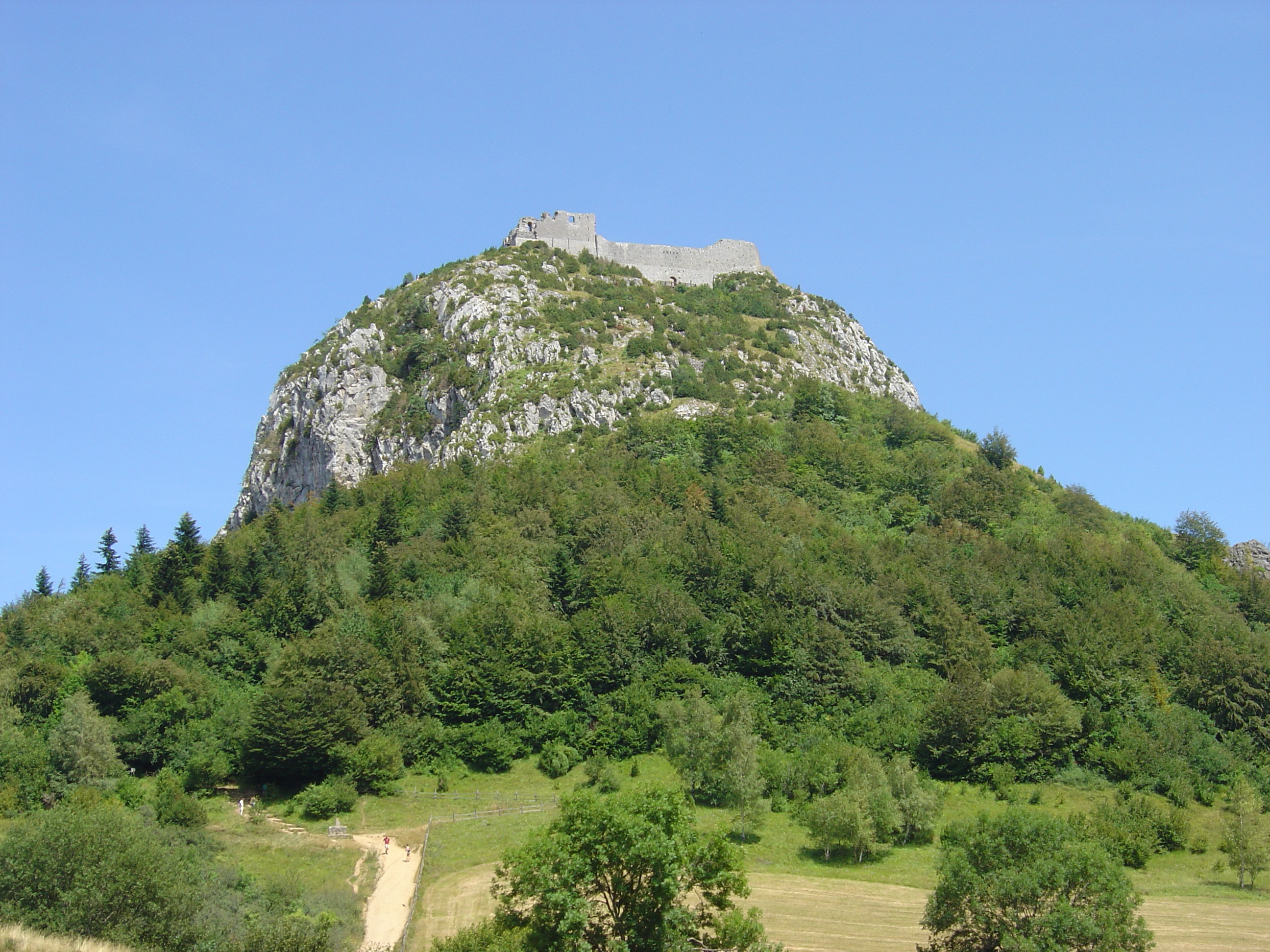
- The limestone rock of Montségur
Date	May 1243 – 16 March 1244
Location	Château de Montségur, Pays d'Olmes, Occitania 42.8756°N 1.8325°E Siege of Montségur
Result	French victory

Belligerents
Kingdom of France; Crusaders	Faitdits

Commanders and leaders
Hugues des Arcis; Pere Amiel; Durand de Belcaire	Pierre Roger de Mirepoix

Strength
~2,000	~100

Casualties and losses
	At least 9 dead
- Location of Montségur within France

The siege of Montségur (May 1243 – 16 March 1244) was a siege that took place during the Albigensian Crusade. It pitted the royal forces of Louis IX of France and those of the bishops of Albi and Narbonne against the forces of Pierre Roger de Mirepoix, who protected a community of Cathars in Montségur.

The castle surrendered after a nine-month siege. About 210 perfecti and unrepentant credentes were burned in a bonfire at the foot of the mountain on 16 March 1244.

== Background ==
Although the Albigensian Crusade had been concluded with the Treaty of Paris-Meaux in 1229, local resistance continued. The Cathar Church was still able to operate and oppose the Inquisition that pervaded the Languedoc. In 1233, the Cathar Bishop Guilhabert de Castres asked Raymond de Pereille for permission to make Montségur "the seat and head" (domicilium et caput) of the Cathar Church.

As a haven for Cathars, Montségur gained symbolic and strategic importance in the resistance fight against the Catholic Church and the French forces in subsequent years.

In 1241, Raymond VII made a token attempt to capture Montségur, primarily to impress the King and the Catholic Church of his allegiance. At that time Montségur housed about 500 people.

In the context of Occitan resistance and possibly linked to Raymond’s efforts to free himself from the chains of the Paris Treaty, two representatives of the Inquisition, William Arnald and Stephen de Saint-Thibéry, as well as their companions and retinue were murdered by about fifty men from Montségur and dispossessed faidits at Avignonet on 28 May 1242. This event led to the decision to send a royal military expedition to eliminate the stronghold.

== Siege ==
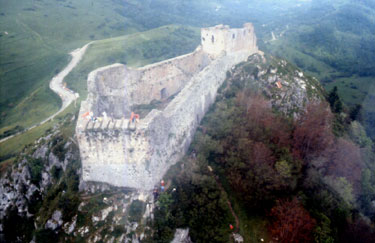
The Château de Montségur was razed after 1244. The current fortress follows French military architecture of the 17th century.

In May 1243, the seneschal Hugues des Arcis led the military command of about 10,000 royal troops against the castle that was held by about 100 fighters and was home to perfecti (who as pacifists did not participate in combat) and civilian refugees. Many of these refugees were Cathar credentes who lived in huts and caves outside the castle on the mountain. The initial strategy was to besiege the castle in expectation that water and supplies would run out, a strategy that had worked well for the crusaders before. However, the defenders were well supplied and able to keep their support lines open, being supported by many of the local population; some reinforcements even arrived. Thus eventually it was decided to attack the place directly, a difficult task due to its well protected location high on a massive limestone rock. After many failures, Basque mercenaries were able to secure a location on the eastern side of the summit across a depression which allowed the construction of a catapult. This forced refugees that were living outside the walls of the castle to move inside, making living conditions difficult. Apparently by treachery, a passage was found to get access to the barbican which was conquered in March 1244. The catapult was now moved closer and the living situation inside deteriorated under the day-and-night bombardment. When an attempt by the garrison failed to dislodge the invaders from the barbican, the defenders gave the signal that they had decided to negotiate for surrender.

== Surrender ==
Surrender conditions were quickly decided on: All the people in the castle were allowed to leave except those who would not renounce their Cathar faith, primarily the perfecti. A two-week truce was declared. The last two weeks were spent praying and fasting. A number of defenders decided to join the about 190 perfecti and received their consolamentum bringing the total number of Cathar believers destined to burn to between 210 and 215. On 16 March, led by Bishop Bertrand Marty, the group left the castle and went down to the place where the wood for the pyre had been erected. No stakes were needed: they mounted the pyre and perished voluntarily in the flames.

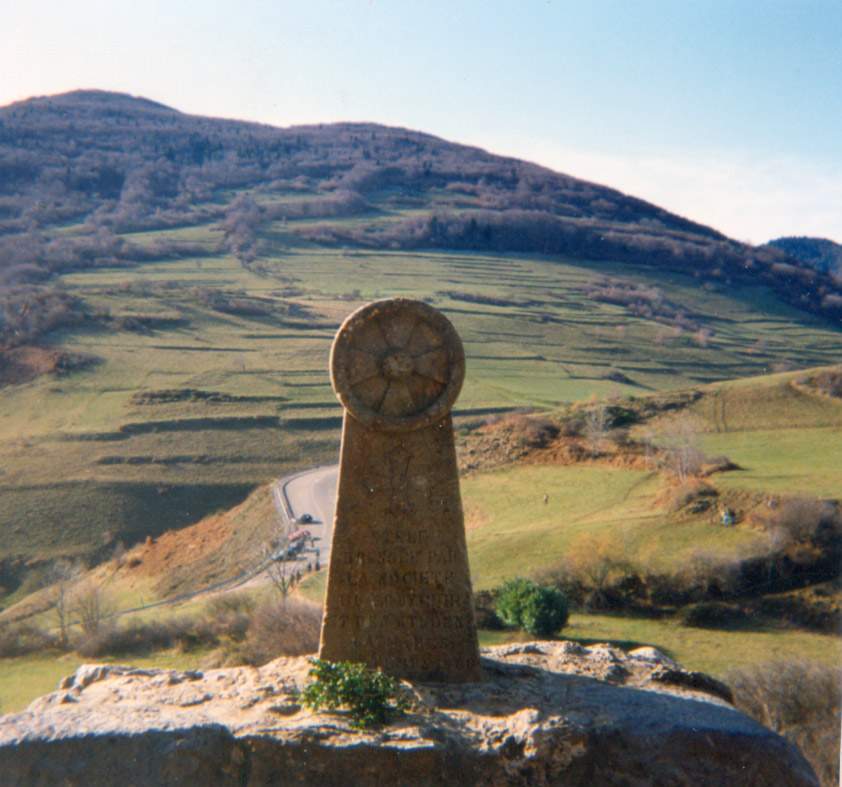
Stele commemorating the Cathars from 16 March 1244

The remainder of the defenders, including those who had participated in the murder of the inquisitors, were allowed to leave, among them Raymond de Pereille who was later, like others, subjected to the Inquisition. It has been claimed that three or four perfecti survived; they left the castle by a secret route to recover a treasure of the Cathars that had been buried in a nearby forest in the weeks prior to the surrender. The treasure not only contained material valuables but also documents and possibly relics. Nothing about its whereabouts is known.

== Aftermath ==
Catharism continued in the Languedoc for many decades but it had lost its organization, and, under the pressure of the Inquisition, adherents if not captured moved to other places, such as Spain and Italy, where conditions were less oppressive. Montségur Castle was destroyed; today’s ruins are a remnant of the French border fortress of a later time.

At the base of the mountain, in the "Prat dels Cremats" (Occitan for "Field of the Burned"), a modern stele commemorates the death of the victims; it is inscribed "Als catars, als martirs del pur amor crestian. 16 de març 1244" (Occitan for "To the Cathars, to the martyrs of pure christian love. 16 March 1244").
