= Carla-de-Roquefort =

Commune in Occitanie, France

- Commune
- Coat of arms
- Location of Carla-de-Roquefort
- Location within France Location within Occitanie
- Coordinates: 42°58′34″N 1°46′08″E
- Country: France
- Region: Occitania
- Department: Ariège
- Arrondissement: Pamiers
- Canton: Pays d'Olmes
- Intercommunality: Pays d'Olmes

Government
  - Mayor (2020–2026): Sandrine Garcia
- Area^{1}: 9.34 km^{2} (3.61 sq mi)
- Elevation: 370 m (1,210 ft)
- Highest elevation: 729 m (2,392 ft)
- Lowest elevation: 368 m (1,207 ft)
- Population (2023): 164
  - Density: 17.6/km^{2} (45.5/sq mi)
- Time zone: UTC+01:00 (CET)
  - Summer (DST): UTC+02:00 (CEST)
- INSEE/Postal code: 09080 /09300
- ^{1} French Land Register data, which excludes lakes, ponds, glaciers > 1 km^{2} (0.386 sq mi or 247 acres) and river estuaries.

Carla-de-Roquefort (French pronunciation: [kaʁla də ʁɔkfɔʁ], literally Carla of Roquefort; Occitan: Le Carlar de Ròcafòrt) is a commune in the Ariège department in southwestern France, with numerous castles and medieval ruins nearby serving as reminders of its Cathar heritage. One notable landmark is the Montségur Castle, which was a center of Cathar resistance.

== Population ==
Historical population
Year	Pop.	±% p.a.
1968	162	—
1975	148	−1.28%
1982	109	−4.28%
1990	143	+3.45%
1999	158	+1.11%
2007	158	+0.00%
2012	154	−0.51%
2017	169	+1.88%
2023	164	−0.50%
Source: INSEE

== See also ==
- Communes of the Ariège department
