= Guilhabert de Castres =

Guilhabert de Castres (about 1165 – 1240) was a prominent Cathar theologian. Born in Castres, he became a Cathar Perfect and, between 1223 and 1226, Bishop of Toulouse in the Cathar Church. In the theological debates in the early 13th century between the Cathars and the Papal representatives, he presented the Cathar arguments, including at the Debate at Montreal in 1206 and at the last Debate at Pamiers where he encountered Saint Dominic in 1207, prior to the Albigensian Crusades.

In 1193, Guilhabert settled in Fanjeaux where he attended to a group of Perfects and believers until Simon de Montfort took the town during the Albigensian Crusade in 1209. Guilhabert withdrew to the Château de Montségur and ministered from its safety. In 1222, Guilhabert escaped from Castelnaudary that was besieged by Amaury VI of Montfort. Five years later, during a respite in the war, he presided over the Cathar synod at the Château de Pieusse where about a hundred Perfects had assembled. During the meeting, it was decided to create the bishopric of Razes. From 1229 to 1232 he lived at the Château du Bézu. Constantly under the threat of persecution, he conducted his pastoral visits to the towns and chateaux of the Languedoc throughout the war.

In 1232, he convinced the lord of the Château de Montségur, Raymond de Péreille (Ramond de Perella), to allow him to set up the "house and head" (domicilium et caput) of the Cathar church at the stronghold, and subsequently the site attracted Cathar refugees and faidits. Guilhabert died in 1240, and was succeeded by Bartrand Marti as bishop.

The fall of Montségur in 1244 effectively ended the Cathar movement.

Zoe Oldenbourg comments:

It is a little disconcerting to find history telling us so little about this man, and indeed about the other leaders of the movement... Yet Guilhabert himself seems to have been one of the greatest personalities of thirteenth-century France. The history of the deeds and actions of these persecuted apostles may well have proved as rich in inspiration and instruction as that of a Francis of Assisi: They too were messengers of God's love. It is not immaterial to recall that these torches were put out forever, their faces obliterated and their example lost to all those whose lives they might have guided during the centuries that followed.

== See also ==
- Esclarmonde of Foix
