= Montferrier =

Commune in Occitanie, France

- Commune
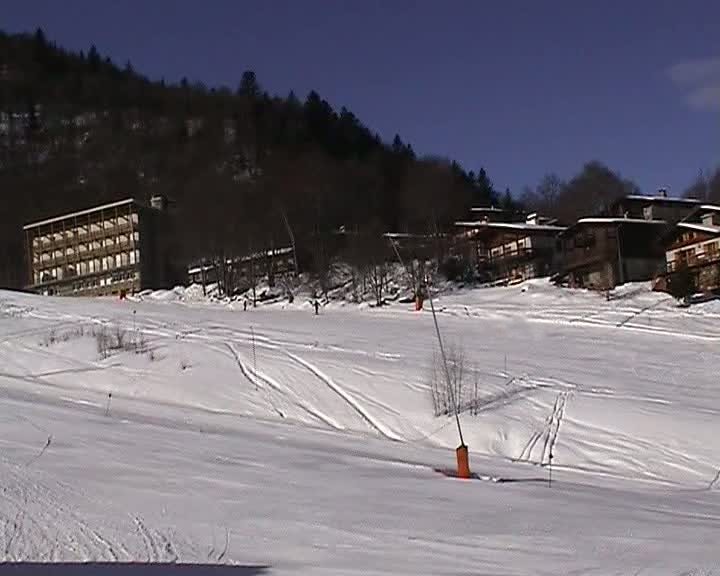
- Monts d'Olmes ski resort

- Coat of arms
- Location of Montferrier
- Location within France Location within Occitanie
- Coordinates: 42°53′47″N 1°47′43″E
- Country: France
- Region: Occitania
- Department: Ariège
- Arrondissement: Pamiers
- Canton: Pays d'Olmes
- Intercommunality: Pays d'Olmes

Government
  - Mayor (2020–2026): Frédéric Philippe Laffont
- Area^{1}: 51.79 km^{2} (20.00 sq mi)
- Elevation: 684 m (2,244 ft)
- Highest elevation: 2,343 m (7,687 ft)
- Lowest elevation: 548 m (1,798 ft)
- Population (2023): 541
  - Density: 10.4/km^{2} (27.1/sq mi)
- Time zone: UTC+01:00 (CET)
  - Summer (DST): UTC+02:00 (CEST)
- INSEE/Postal code: 09206 /09300
- ^{1} French Land Register data, which excludes lakes, ponds, glaciers > 1 km^{2} (0.386 sq mi or 247 acres) and river estuaries.

Montferrier (French pronunciation: [mɔ̃fɛʁje]; Occitan: Montferrièr) is a commune in the Ariège department in southwestern France.

== Population ==
Historical population
| Year | Pop. | ±% p.a. |
|---|---|---|
| 1968 | 742 | — |
| 1975 | 735 | −0.14% |
| 1982 | 733 | −0.04% |
| 1990 | 748 | +0.25% |
| 1999 | 664 | −1.31% |
| 2007 | 651 | −0.25% |
| 2012 | 628 | −0.72% |
| 2017 | 495 | −4.65% |
| 2023 | 541 | +1.49% |
Source: INSEE

== See also ==
- Communes of the Ariège department
