= Canton of Pays d'Olmes =

Coordinates: 42.93°N 1.85°E

- Canton
- Situation of the canton of Pays d'Olmes in the department of Ariège
- Country: France
- Region: Occitania
- Department: Ariège
- No. of communes: {{{nbcomm}}}
- Population (2023): 12,136
- INSEE code: 0909

The canton of Pays d'Olmes is an administrative division of the Ariège department, southern France. It was created at the French canton reorganisation which came into effect in March 2015. Its seat is in Lavelanet.

It consists of the following communes:

1. L'Aiguillon
2. Bélesta
3. Bénaix
4. Carla-de-Roquefort
5. Dreuilhe
6. Fougax-et-Barrineuf
7. Freychenet
8. Ilhat
9. Lavelanet
10. Lesparrou
11. Leychert
12. Lieurac
13. Montferrier
14. Montségur
15. Nalzen
16. Péreille
17. Raissac
18. Roquefixade
19. Roquefort-les-Cascades
20. Saint-Jean-d'Aigues-Vives
21. Sautel
22. Soula
23. Villeneuve-d'Olmes
