= Lesparrou =

Commune in Occitanie, France

- Commune
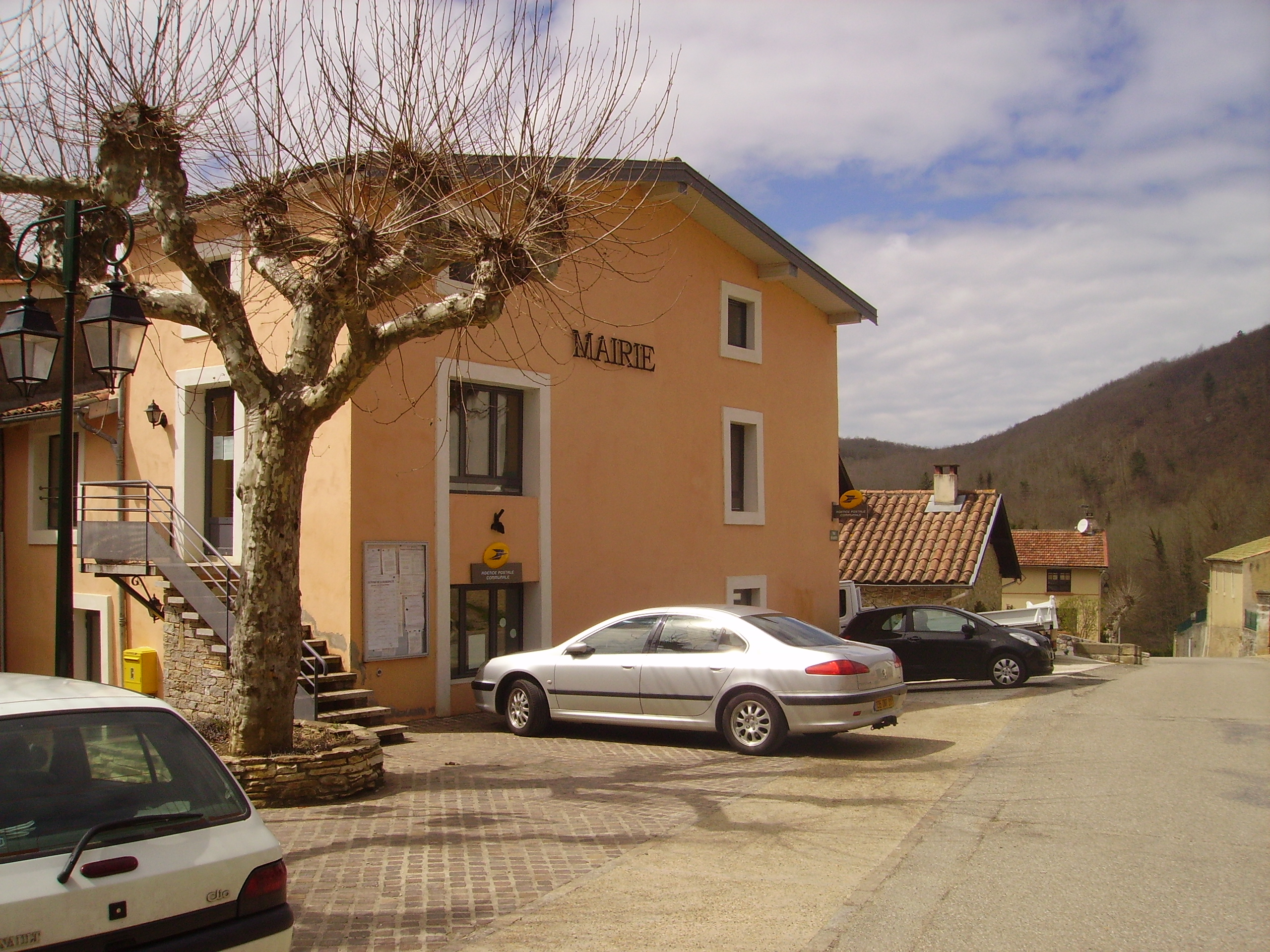
- The town hall in Lesparrou

- Coat of arms
- Location of Lesparrou
- Location within France Location within Occitanie
- Coordinates: 42°55′53″N 1°54′19″E
- Country: France
- Region: Occitania
- Department: Ariège
- Arrondissement: Pamiers
- Canton: Pays d'Olmes
- Intercommunality: Pays d'Olmes

Government
  - Mayor (2020–2026): Pascale Audouy
- Area^{1}: 16.09 km^{2} (6.21 sq mi)
- Elevation: 450 m (1,480 ft)
- Highest elevation: 761 m (2,497 ft)
- Lowest elevation: 440 m (1,440 ft)
- Population (2023): 236
  - Density: 14.7/km^{2} (38.0/sq mi)
- Time zone: UTC+01:00 (CET)
  - Summer (DST): UTC+02:00 (CEST)
- INSEE/Postal code: 09165 /09300
- ^{1} French Land Register data, which excludes lakes, ponds, glaciers > 1 km^{2} (0.386 sq mi or 247 acres) and river estuaries.

Lesparrou (French pronunciation: [lɛspaʁu]; Occitan: L'Esparron) is a commune in the Ariège department in southwestern France.

== Population ==
Historical population
Year	Pop.	±% p.a.
1968	387	—
1975	366	−0.79%
1982	291	−3.22%
1990	290	−0.04%
1999	265	−1.00%
2007	246	−0.93%
2012	235	−0.91%
2017	232	−0.26%
2023	236	+0.29%
Source: INSEE

== See also ==
- Communes of the Ariège department
