= Château de Montségur =

Castle in France

- Montségur, France
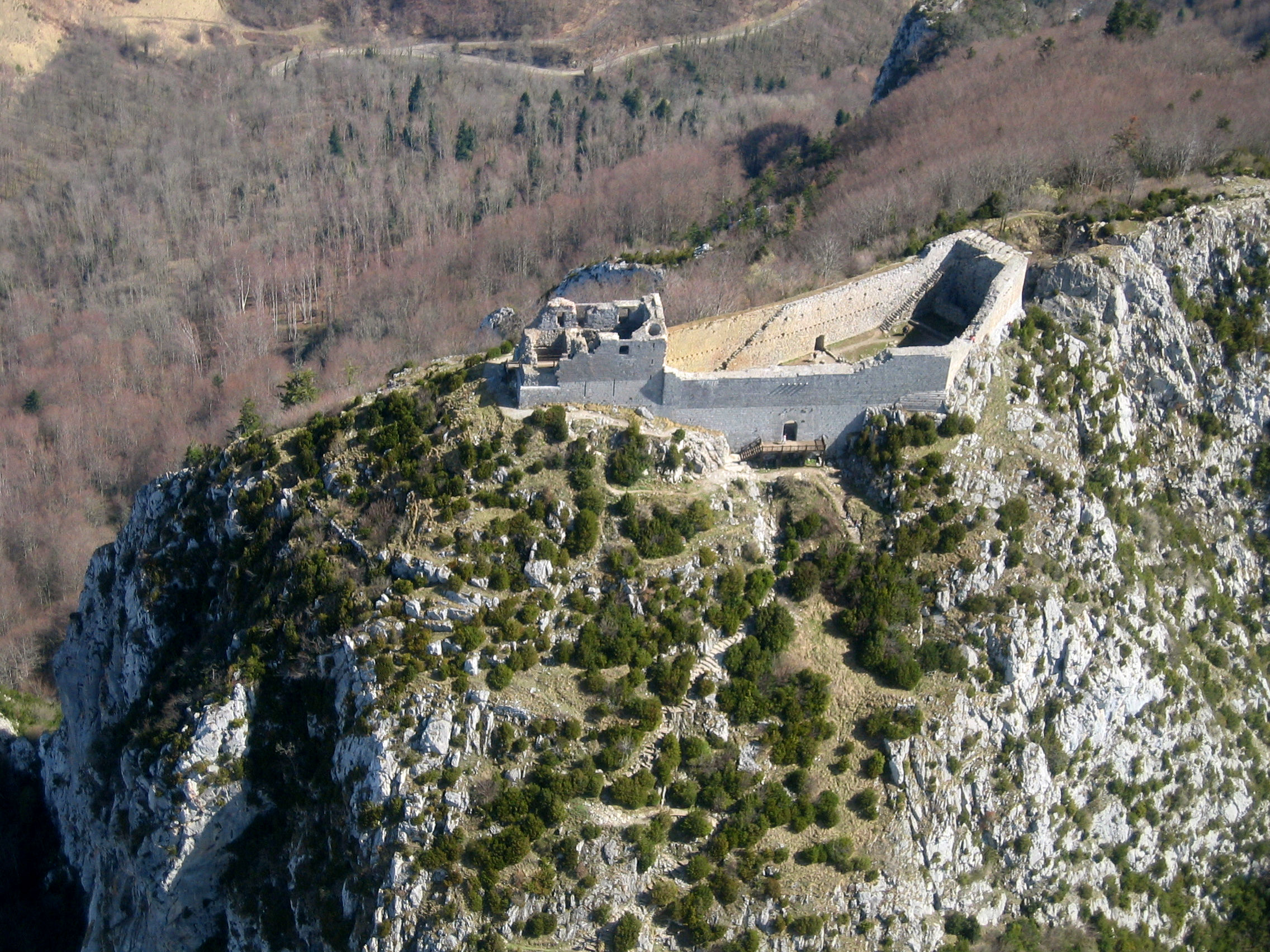
- The Fortress of Montségur

Site information
- Condition: In ruins

Location
- Location within France
- Coordinates: 42°52′32″N 1°49′57″E

Site history
- Built: 13th century

UNESCO World Heritage Site
- Official name: Château de Montésgur
- Part of: Royal Capetian Fortresses of Languedoc
- Criteria: Cultural: iv
- Reference: 1755
- Inscription: 2026 (48th Session)

The Château de Montségur (English: Castle of Montsegur; Languedocien: Castèl de Montsegur) is a former fortress near Montségur, a commune in the Ariège department in southern France. Its ruins are the site of a razed stronghold of the Cathars. The present fortress on the site, though described as one of the "Cathar castles," is actually of a later period. It has been listed as a monument historique by the French Ministry of Culture since 1862. In July 2026, the Royal Capetian Fortresses of Languedoc (including this fortress) were designated by UNESCO as a World Heritage Site.

== Geography ==
The ruins of Montségur are perched at a precarious 1,200 metres (3,900 ft) altitude in the south of France near the Pyrenees. Located in the heart of France's Languedoc-Occitanie regions, 80 km (50 mi) southwest of Carcassonne, Montségur dominates a rock formation known as a pog — a term derived from the Languedocien dialect of Occitan — puòg or puèg, meaning "peak, hill, mountain." The top of the ruin is reached by a path and is 170 m above the road.

== History ==
The earliest signs of human settlement in the area date back to the Stone Age. Evidence of Roman occupation such as Roman currency and tools have also been found in and around the site. The name comes from Latin mons securus, which evolved into mont ségur in Occitan, which means "safe hill". In the Middle Ages the Montsegur region was ruled by the Counts of Toulouse, the Viscounts of Carcassonne and finally the Counts of Foix. Little is known about the fortification until the time of the Albigensian Crusade.

=== Cathar castle ===
In about 1204, Raymond de Péreille, one of the two lords of Montségur, the other being his cousin Pierre-Roger de Mirepoix, decided to rebuild the castle that had been in ruins for 40 years or more. Refortified, the castle became a center of Cathar activities, and home to Guilhabert de Castres, a Cathar theologian and bishop. In 1233 the site became "the seat and head" (domicilium et caput) of the Cathar church. It has been estimated that the fortified site housed about 500 people when in 1241, Raymond VII besieged Montsegur without success. The murder of representatives of the inquisition by about fifty men from Montsegur and faidits at Avignonet on May 28, 1242, was the trigger for the final military expedition to conquer the castle, the siege of Montségur.

In 1242 Hugues de Arcis led the military command of about 10,000 royal troops against the castle that was held by about 100 fighters and was home to 211 Perfects (who were pacifists and did not fight) and civilian refugees. The siege lasted nine months, until in March 1244, the castle finally surrendered. Approximately 220 Cathars were burned en masse in a bonfire at the foot of the pog when they refused to renounce their faith. Some 25 actually took the ultimate Cathar vow of consolamentum perfecti in the two weeks before the final surrender. Those who renounced the Cathar faith were allowed to leave and the castle itself was destroyed.

In the days prior to the fall of the fortress, several Cathars allegedly slipped through the besiegers' lines. This led to legends that they escaped with a secret treasure or esoteric knowledge. In 1906, esoteric French writer Joséphin Péladan proposed that the treasure was really the Holy Grail, arguing that Montségur was the Munsalväsche (or Montsalvat) of Wolfram von Eschenbach's 13th-century Grail romance Parzival. This idea was followed and expanded upon by various later writers, especially in France, and has inspired legends, conspiracy theories, and fictional works associating the Cathars and Montségur with the Holy Grail.

=== The later fortress ===
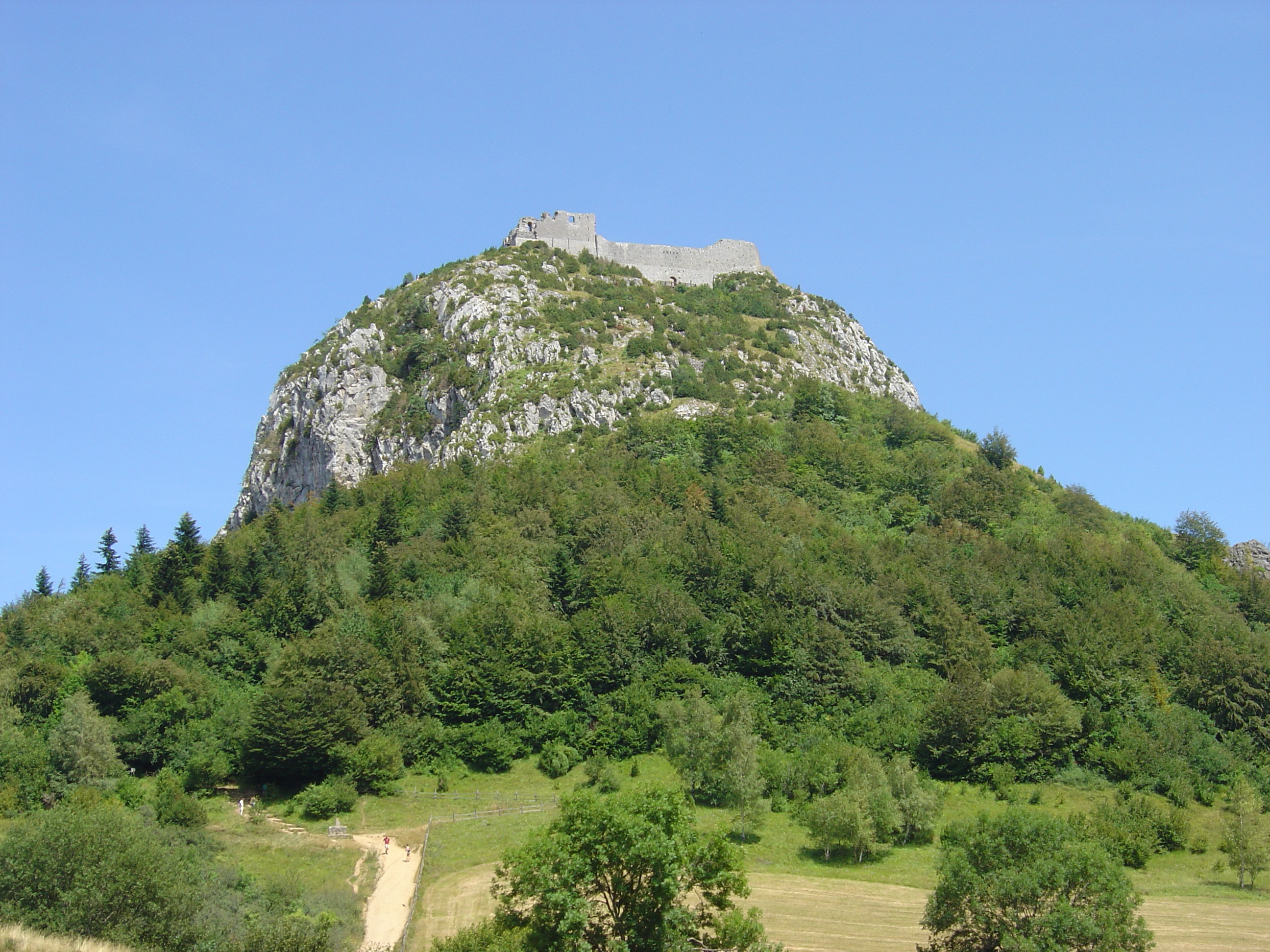
Montségur

The present fortress ruin at Montségur is not from the Cathar era. The original Cathar fortress of Montségur was entirely pulled down by the victorious royal forces after its capture in 1244. It was gradually rebuilt and upgraded over the next three centuries by royal forces. The current ruin so dramatically occupying the site, and featured in illustrations, is referred to by French archeologists as "Montsegur III" and is typical of post-medieval royal French defensive architecture of the 17th century. It is not "Montsegur II," the structure in which the Cathars lived and were besieged, of which few traces remain today.

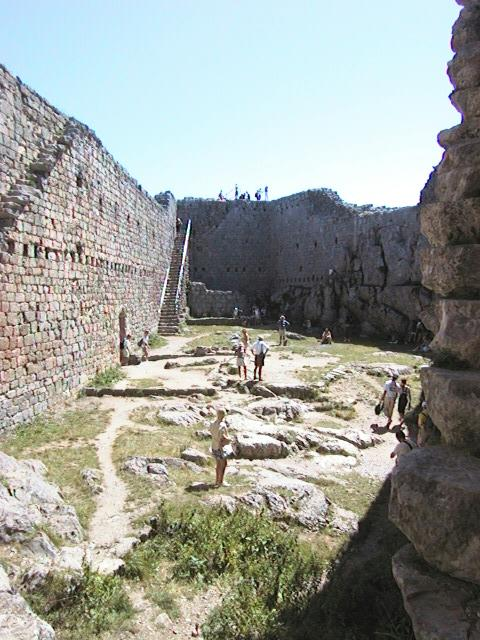
Inner courtyard

Montségur's solar alignment characteristics, visible on the morning of the summer solstice in particular, are part of what set this castle apart as an architectural wonder. This often mentioned solar phenomenon, occurring in an alignment of two windows in the fortress wall, has been observed by hundreds of students, astronomers, spiritual pilgrims and locals alike who come to the chateau specifically to view it every year and has been recorded and included in the documentary "The Otherworld," (by Richard Stanley) in 2013.

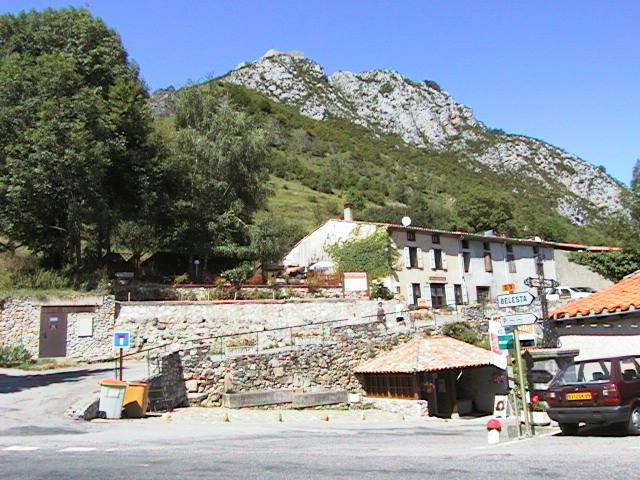
Montségur from village

The Groupe de Recherches Archéologiques de Montségur et Environs (GRAME) (Archeological Research Group of Montsegur and Vicinity), which conducted a 13-year archeological excavation of Montségur with minimal funds and the technology available at the time in 1964–76, concluded in its final report, which was not widely published, is not viewed as solid archeological research, and is hotly disputed by many, that:

There remains no trace within the present-day ruins, neither of the first fortress which was abandoned before the 13th century (Montsegur I), nor of the one which was built by Raymond de Péreille around 1210 (Montsegur II)..." (Il ne reste aucune trace dans les ruines actuelles ni du premier château qui était à l'abandon au début du XIIIe siècle (Montségur I), ni de celui que construisit Raimon de Pereilles vers 1210 (Montségur II)...)

This small quote is all that can be found of this study, and no other study has been done. Despite its questionable veracity and ethics, it has been repeated and quoted in virtually every document to be found on the subject.

The small ruins of the terraced dwellings, immediately outside the perimeter of the current fortress walls on the north-eastern flank are, however, confirmed to be traces of authentic former Cathar habitations.

== Gallery ==
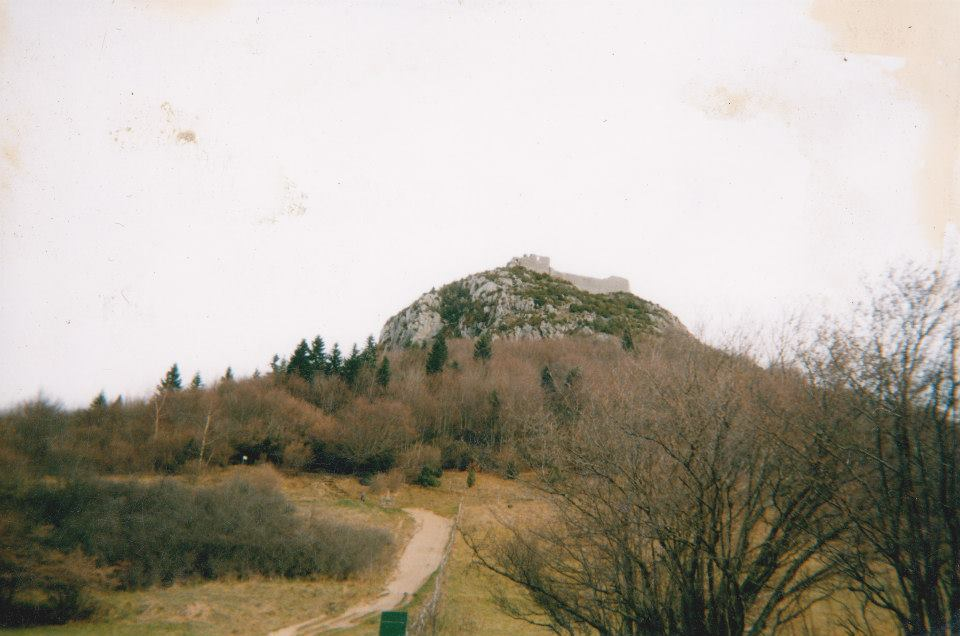

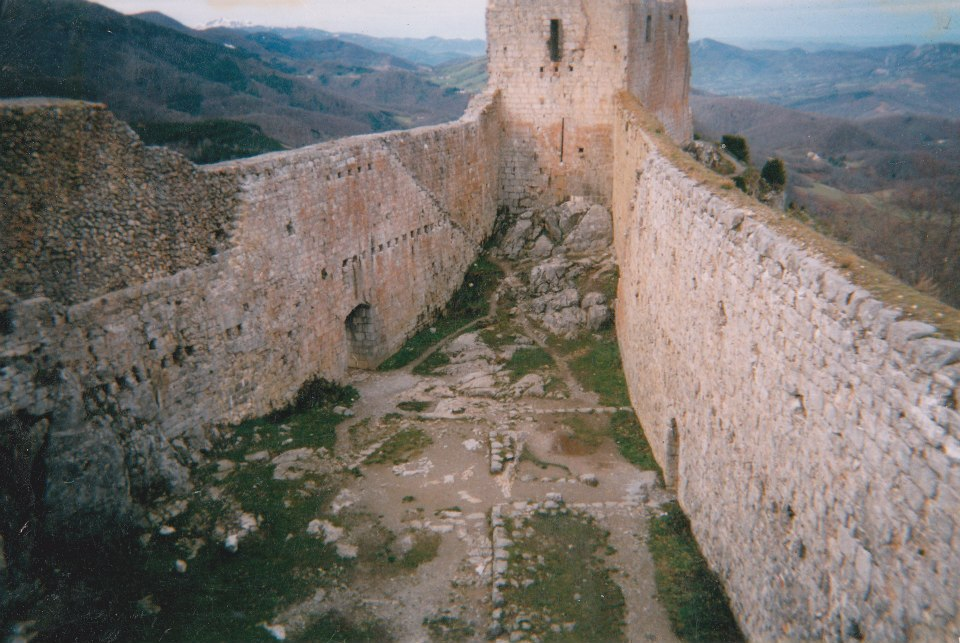

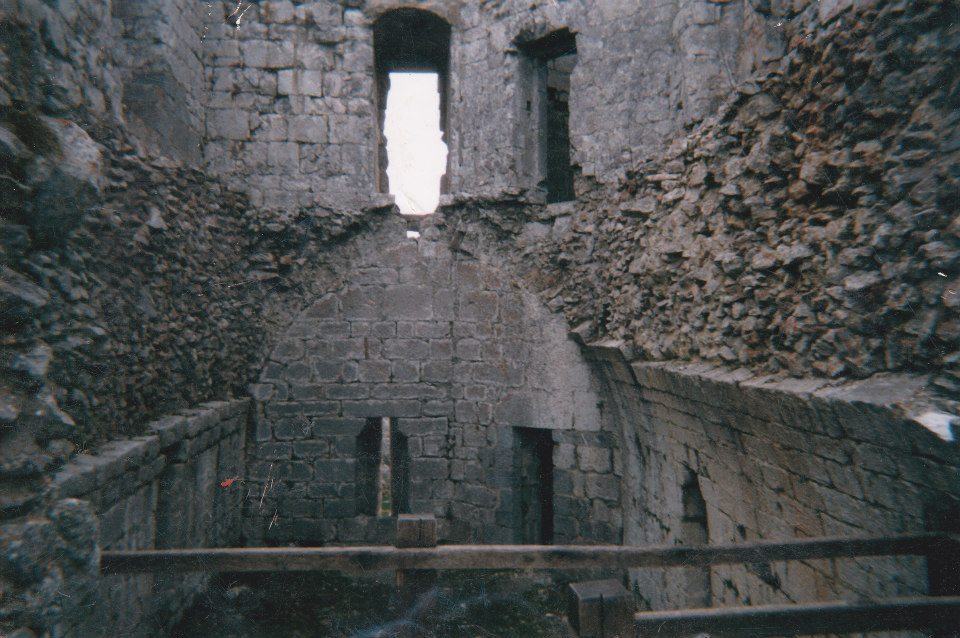

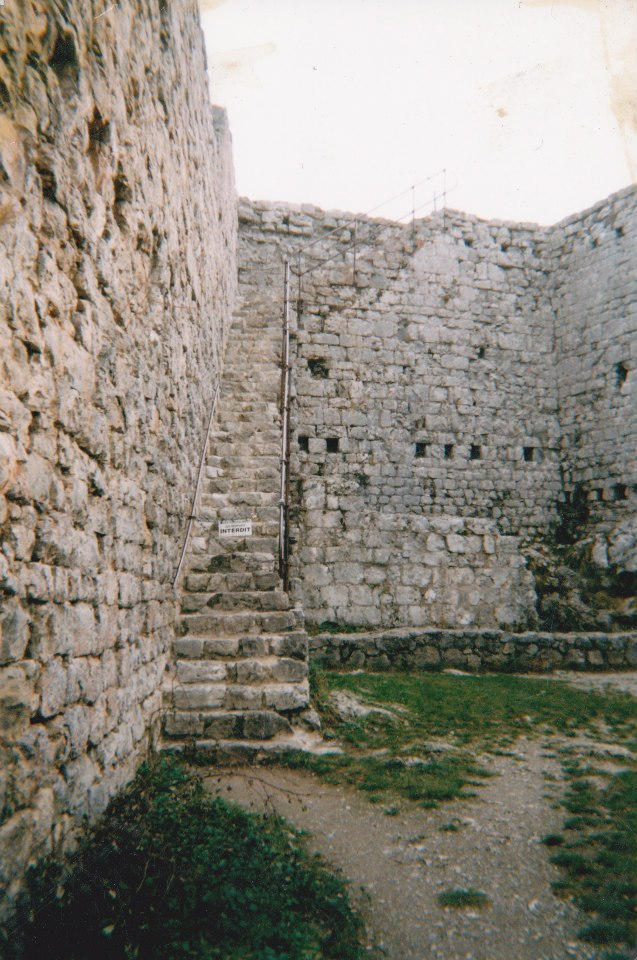

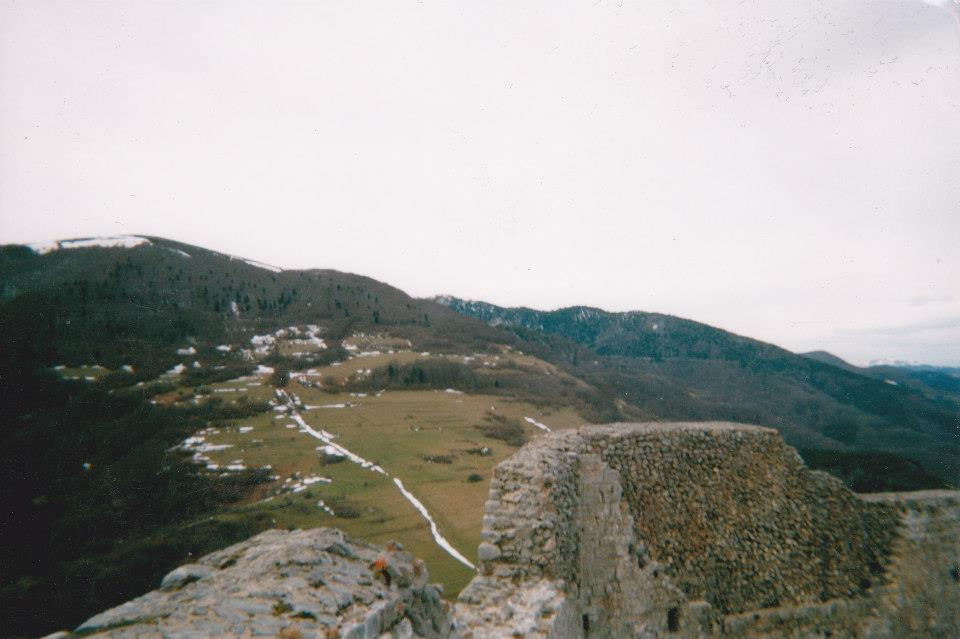

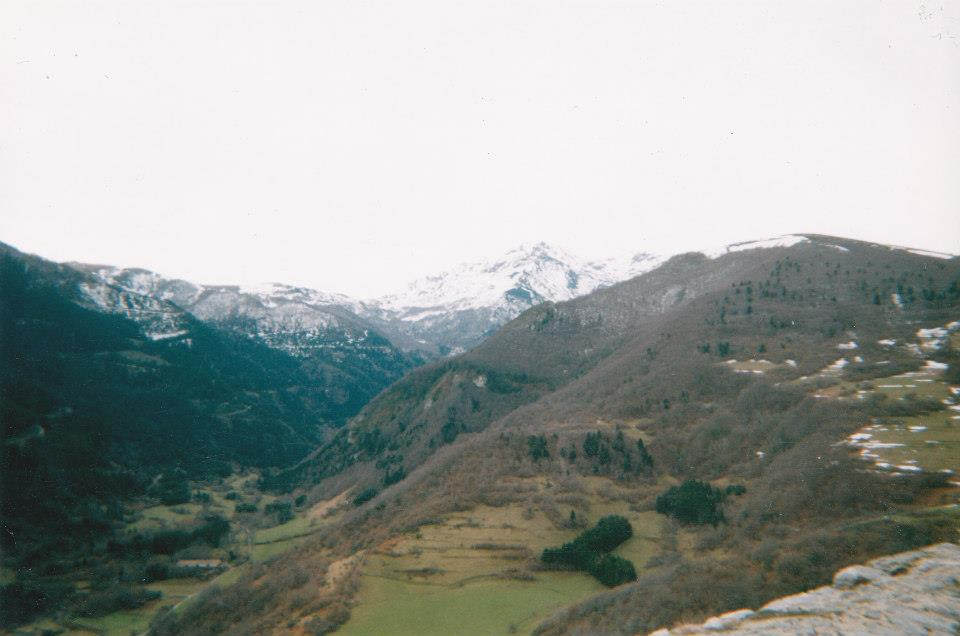

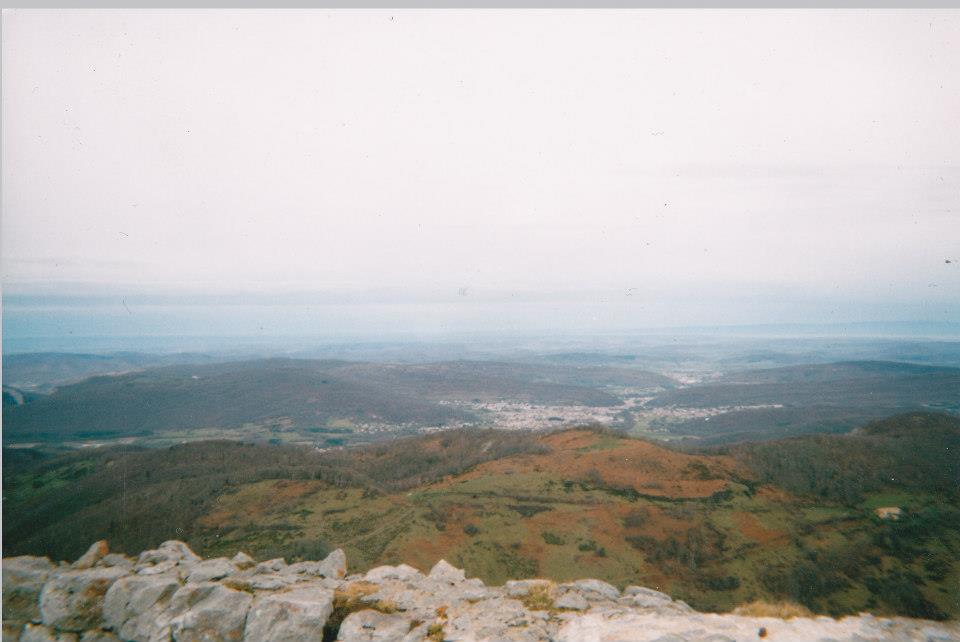

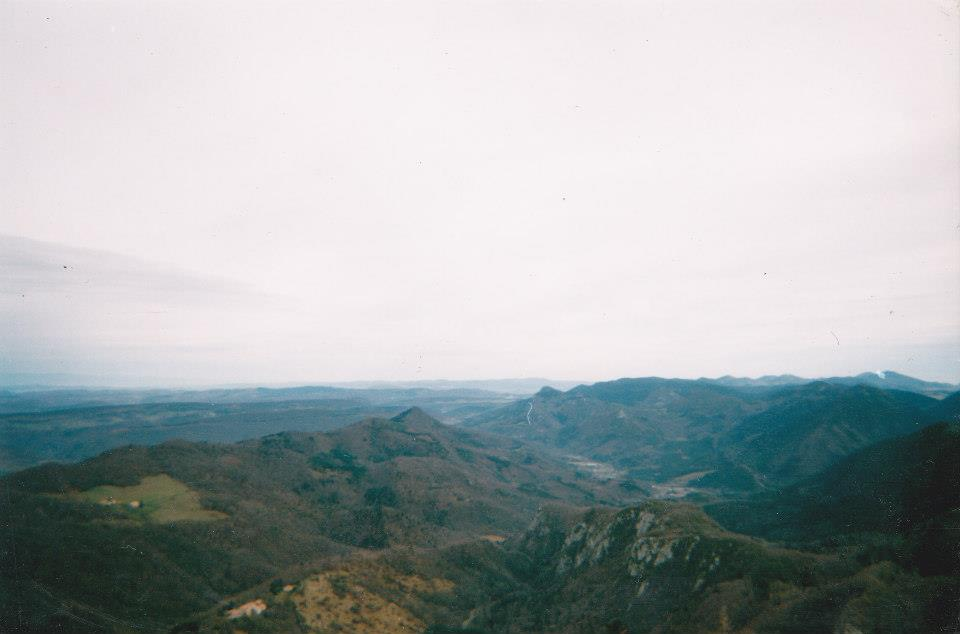

== Media ==
- Iron Maiden published a song titled "Montségur", about the Catholics' stakes of Cathars, on their 2003 album Dance of Death.
- German thrash metal band Paradox's album Heresy deals with the persecution of the Cathars.
- Belgian symphonic black metal band, Lemuria, also released a 2010 album, Chanson de la Croisade, dealing with Cathars persecution in the Albigensian Crusades.
- The Era albums allude to the history of the Cathars, and the first album mentions Montségur on its cover.
- In Peter Berling's pentalogy The Children of the Grail and in Julia Navarro's La sangre de los inocentes, the siege of Montségur is described.
- Maurice Magre's novels «The Blood of Toulouse» and «The Treasure of the Albigensians» center around the history of Catharism and the siege of Montségur.
- The Les Mystères du peuple (1849–1856) series of historical novels by Eugène Sue, features a historical novel about the persecution of the Cathars at Montségur. This story was later translated into English as The Iron Pincers.
- In Dan McNeil's novel The Judas Apocalypse, set just after the landings at Normandy during the Second World War, a German archaeologist and a group of American soldiers go looking for the Cathar treasure that was removed from Montségur.
- Sylvie Miller & Philippe Ward's novel The Song of Montségur (Le Chant de Montségur, 2001) pits the Roman Catholic Church against an ancient secret society of Nazis looking for the Holy Grail in Montségur.
- Kathleen McGowan's novel "The Expected One" incorporates the story of the Siege of Montsegur in the telling of Cathar history.
- Robert Shea's 1986 novel, All Things Are Lights features the siege of Montségur as part of its narrative.
- Sophy Burnham's novel, The Treasure of Montségur (2003) focuses on the siege of the castle.
- Kate Mosse's novel, Labyrinth (2005) also describes the besieging of the Cathars at Montségur and explains some aspects of the connection between the Cathars and the Grail legend.
- E. D. deBirmingham's novel, Siege Perilous, revolves around the Siege of Montsegur in a somewhat alternate/magical history.
- Richard Stanley's documentaries, The Secret Glory (2001) and The Otherworld (2013) detail the neo-Cathar revival of the nineteen twenties and thirties, its ramifications in the present day and the mythic connections between Montségur and the Grail.
- The Casket of Maria Medici, 1980, Detective film based on Cathar treasures legend.

== See also ==
- Albigensian Crusade
- Cathar castles
- Cathars
- Otto Rahn
- List of castles in France
- List of medieval bridges in France
- Communes of the Ariège department
