= Villeneuve-d'Olmes =

Commune in Occitanie, France

- Commune
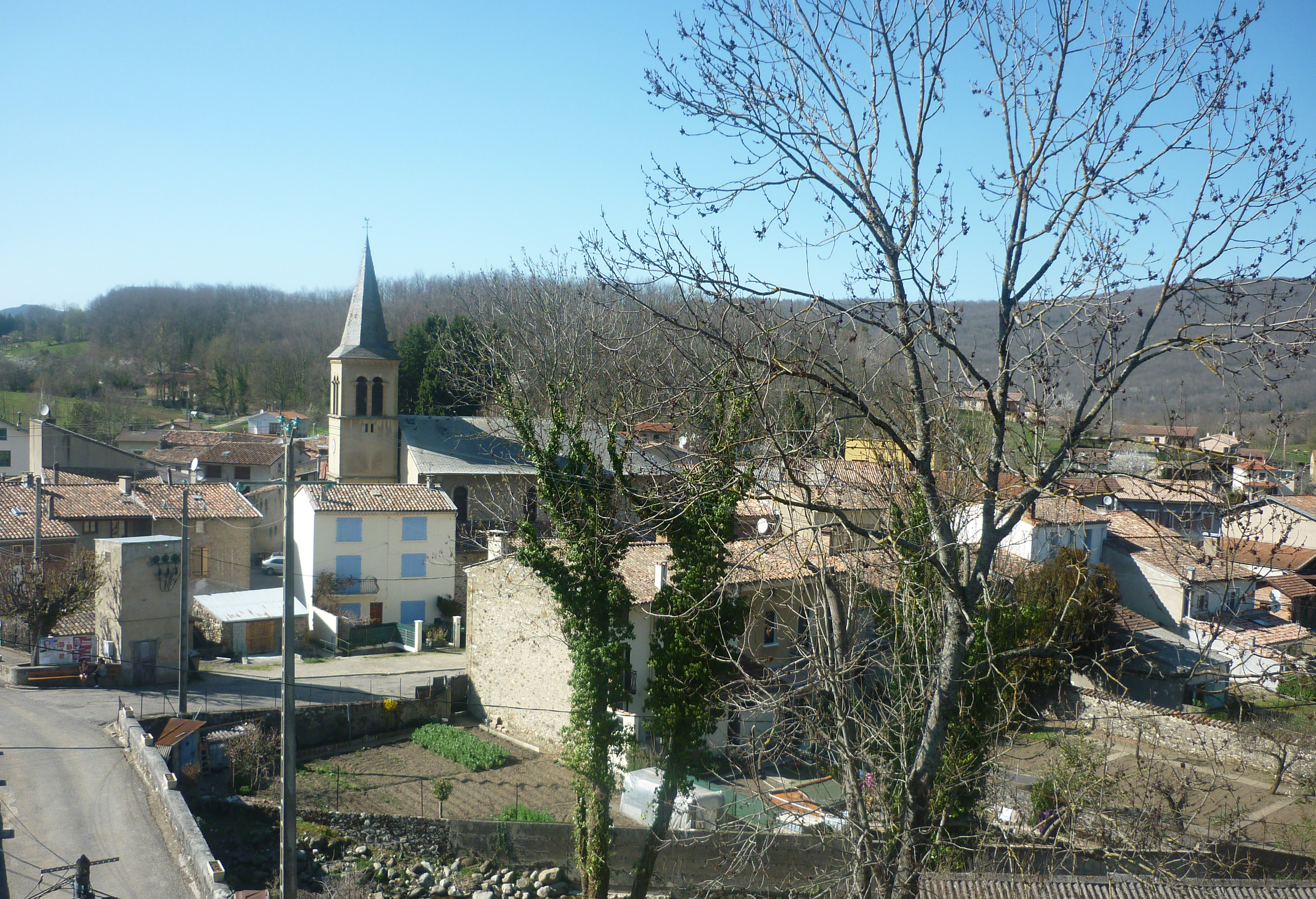
- A general view of Villeneuve-d'Olmes

- Coat of arms
- Location of Villeneuve-d'Olmes
- Location within France Location within Occitanie
- Coordinates: 42°54′30″N 1°49′16″E
- Country: France
- Region: Occitania
- Department: Ariège
- Arrondissement: Pamiers
- Canton: Pays d'Olmes
- Intercommunality: Pays d'Olmes

Government
  - Mayor (2020–2026): Gérald Sgobbo
- Area^{1}: 5.92 km^{2} (2.29 sq mi)
- Elevation: 600 m (2,000 ft)
- Highest elevation: 880 m (2,890 ft)
- Lowest elevation: 544 m (1,785 ft)
- Population (2023): 965
  - Density: 163/km^{2} (422/sq mi)
- Time zone: UTC+01:00 (CET)
  - Summer (DST): UTC+02:00 (CEST)
- INSEE/Postal code: 09336 /09300
- ^{1} French Land Register data, which excludes lakes, ponds, glaciers > 1 km^{2} (0.386 sq mi or 247 acres) and river estuaries.

Villeneuve-d'Olmes (French pronunciation: [vilnœv dɔlm]; Occitan: Vilanòva d'Òlmes) is a commune in the Ariège department in southwestern France.

== Population ==
Inhabitants of Villeneuve-d'Olmes are called Villeneuvois in French.

Historical population
| Year | Pop. | ±% p.a. |
|---|---|---|
| 1968 | 911 | — |
| 1975 | 1,339 | +5.66% |
| 1982 | 1,816 | +4.45% |
| 1990 | 1,574 | −1.77% |
| 1999 | 1,292 | −2.17% |
| 2007 | 1,162 | −1.32% |
| 2012 | 1,057 | −1.88% |
| 2017 | 989 | −1.32% |
| 2023 | 965 | −0.41% |
Source: INSEE

== See also ==
- Communes of the Ariège department
