= Avignonet-Lauragais =

Avignonet-Lauragais Avinhonet de Lauragués (Occitan)
- Commune
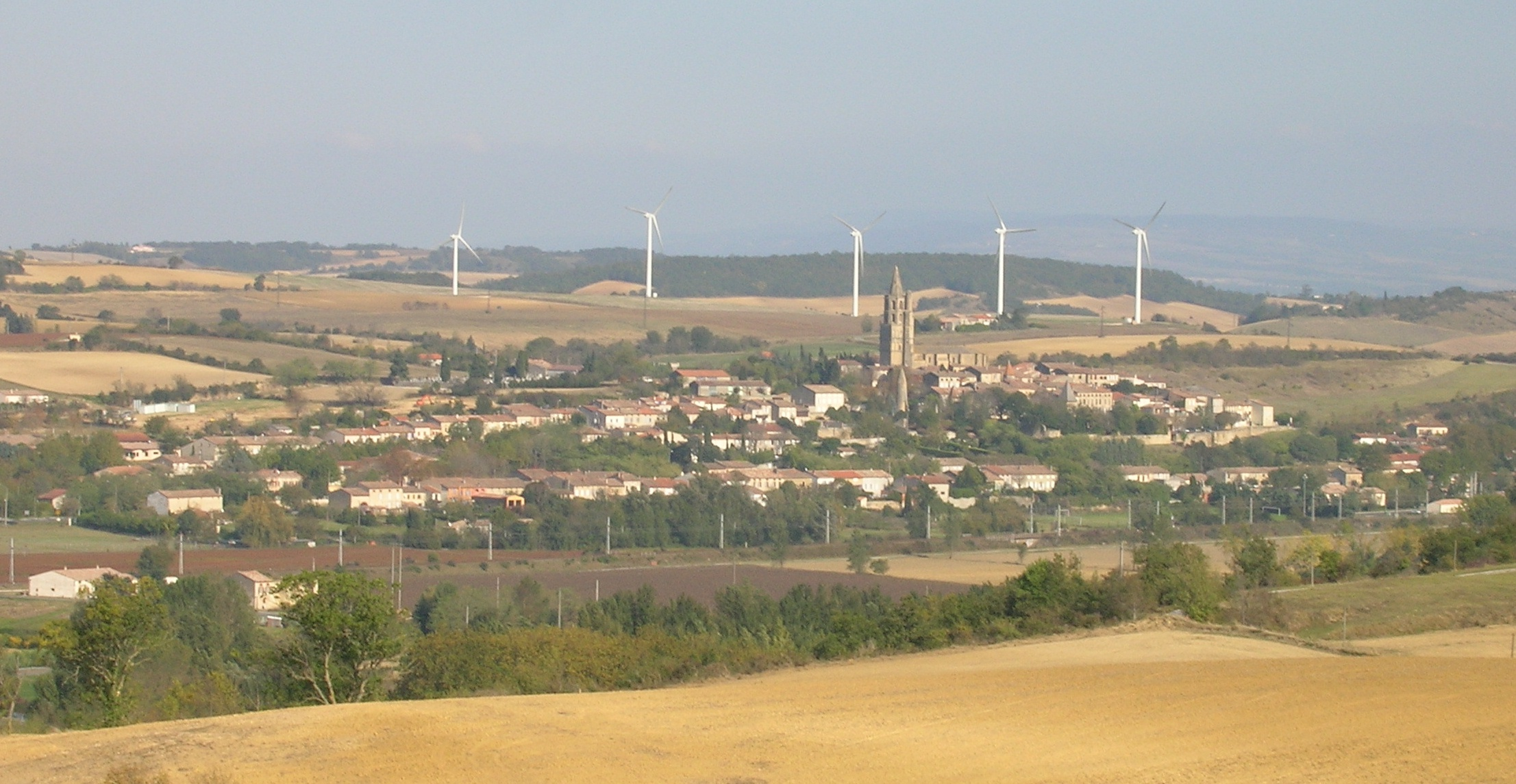
- A general view of Avignonet-Lauragais

- Coat of arms
- Location of Avignonet-Lauragais
- Location within France Location within Occitanie
- Coordinates: 43°22′00″N 1°47′23″E
- Country: France
- Region: Occitania
- Department: Haute-Garonne
- Arrondissement: Toulouse
- Canton: Revel
- Intercommunality: CC Terres Lauragais

Government
  - Mayor (2022–2026): Patricia Malmaison
- Area^{1}: 40.66 km^{2} (15.70 sq mi)
- Elevation: 215 m (705 ft)
- Highest elevation: 274 m (899 ft)
- Lowest elevation: 176 m (577 ft)
- Population (2023): 1,573
  - Density: 38.69/km^{2} (100.2/sq mi)
- Time zone: UTC+01:00 (CET)
  - Summer (DST): UTC+02:00 (CEST)
- INSEE/Postal code: 31037 /31290
- ^{1} French Land Register data, which excludes lakes, ponds, glaciers > 1 km^{2} (0.386 sq mi or 247 acres) and river estuaries.

Avignonet-Lauragais (French pronunciation: [aviɲɔnɛ loʁaɡɛ]; Occitan: Avinhonet de Lauragués) is a commune in the Haute-Garonne department in southwestern France.

== History ==
In 1242 Avignonet-Lauragais was the site of a massacre of Inquisitors by members of a heretical garrison at the Castle of Montségur. The massacre led to the Siege of Montségur.

== Population ==
Historical population
Year	Pop.	±% p.a.
1968	1,040	—
1975	938	−1.46%
1982	931	−0.11%
1990	954	+0.31%
1999	1,069	+1.27%
2007	1,241	+1.88%
2012	1,399	+2.43%
2017	1,534	+1.86%
2023	1,573	+0.42%
Source: INSEE

== Twin towns ==
Avignonet-Lauragais is twinned with:

- Avinyonet de Puigventós, Spain

== See also ==
- Communes of the Haute-Garonne department
