= Roquefixade =

Commune in Occitanie, France

- Commune
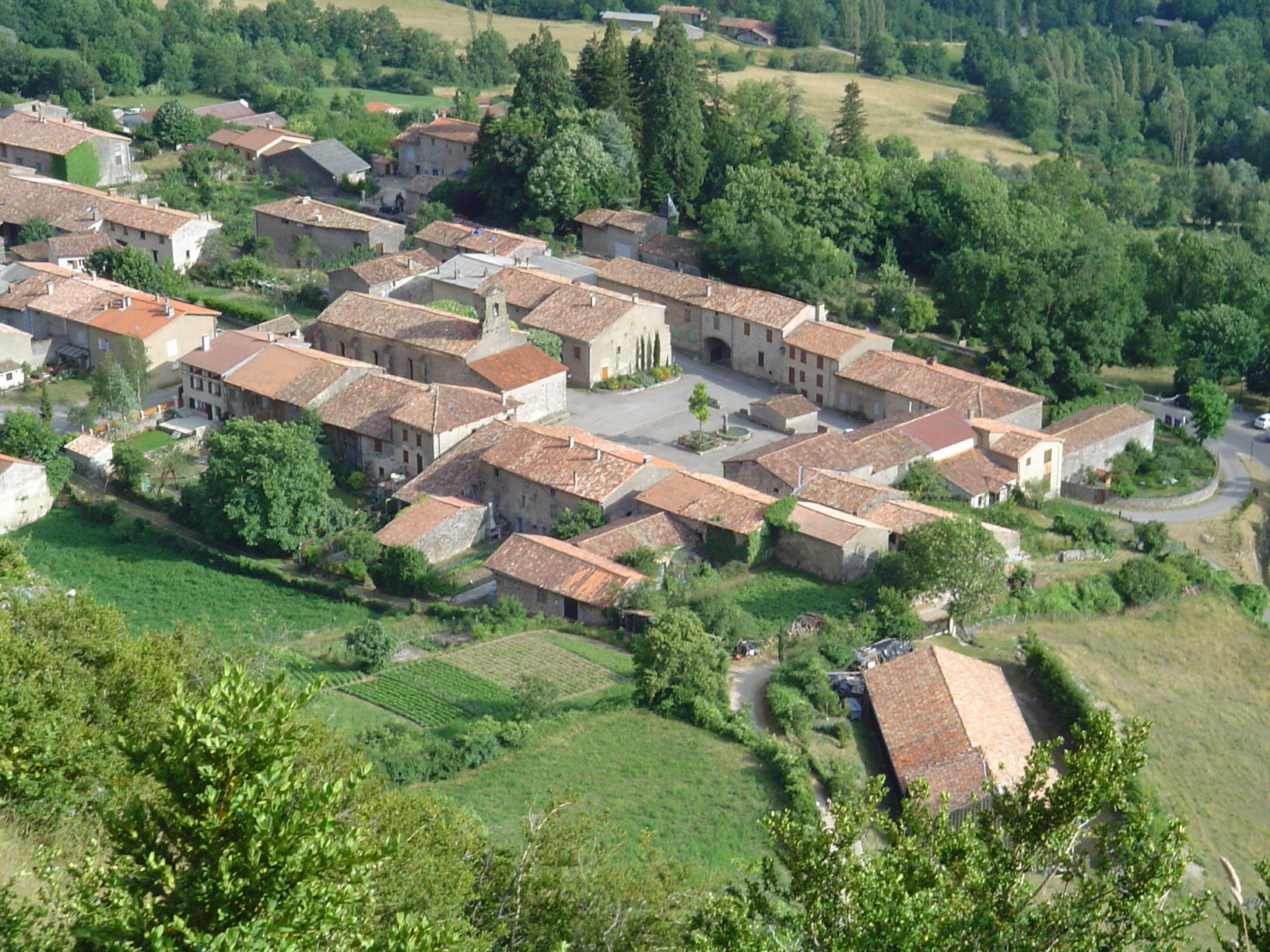
- Roquefixade seen from above
- Location of Roquefixade
- Location within France Location within Occitanie
- Coordinates: 42°56′10″N 1°45′24″E
- Country: France
- Region: Occitania
- Department: Ariège
- Arrondissement: Pamiers
- Canton: Pays d'Olmes

Government
  - Mayor (2020–2026): Michel Sabatier
- Area^{1}: 12.31 km^{2} (4.75 sq mi)
- Elevation: 803 m (2,635 ft)
- Highest elevation: 995 m (3,264 ft)
- Lowest elevation: 508 m (1,667 ft)
- Population (2023): 152
  - Density: 12.3/km^{2} (32.0/sq mi)
- Time zone: UTC+01:00 (CET)
  - Summer (DST): UTC+02:00 (CEST)
- INSEE/Postal code: 09249 /09300
- ^{1} French Land Register data, which excludes lakes, ponds, glaciers > 1 km^{2} (0.386 sq mi or 247 acres) and river estuaries.

Roquefixade (French pronunciation: [ʁɔk.fiksad]; Occitan: Ròcafixada) is a commune in the Ariège department in southwestern France.

== Population ==
Inhabitants of Roquefixade are called Rocofissadois in French.

Historical population
Year	Pop.	±% p.a.
1968	139	—
1975	142	+0.31%
1982	168	+2.43%
1990	170	+0.15%
1999	151	−1.31%
2007	144	−0.59%
2012	152	+1.09%
2017	149	−0.40%
2023	152	+0.33%
Source: INSEE

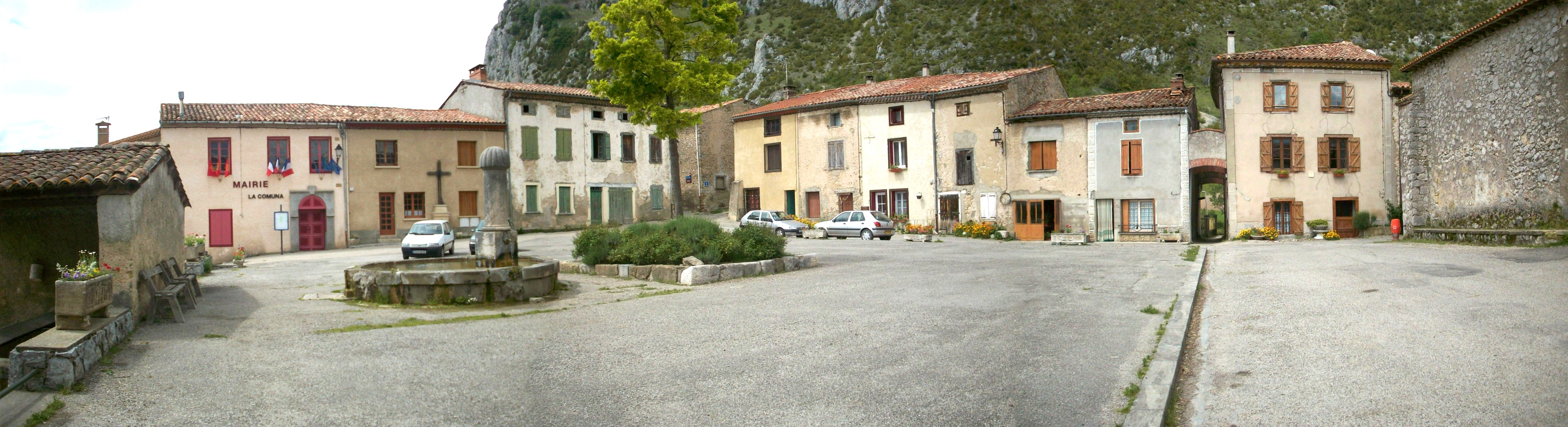
Village square

== See also ==
- Communes of the Ariège department
