= Péreille =

Commune in Occitanie, France

- Commune
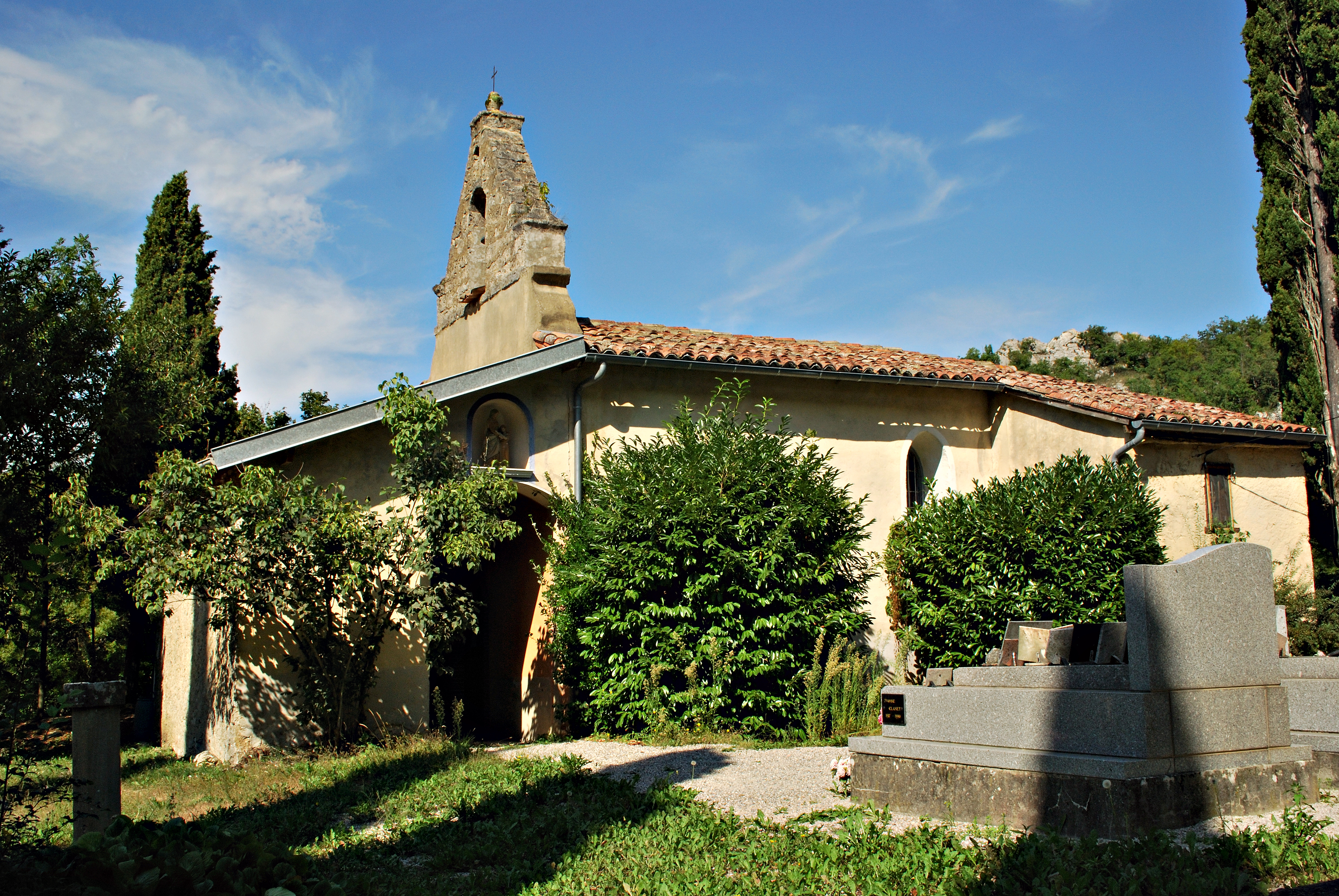
- The church in Péreille

- Coat of arms
- Location of Péreille
- Location within France Location within Occitanie
- Coordinates: 42°56′23″N 1°48′09″E
- Country: France
- Region: Occitania
- Department: Ariège
- Arrondissement: Pamiers
- Canton: Pays d'Olmes
- Intercommunality: Pays d'Olmes

Government
  - Mayor (2020–2026): Marc Gallois
- Area^{1}: 5.36 km^{2} (2.07 sq mi)
- Elevation: 646 m (2,119 ft)
- Highest elevation: 841 m (2,759 ft)
- Lowest elevation: 485 m (1,591 ft)
- Population (2023): 182
  - Density: 34.0/km^{2} (87.9/sq mi)
- Time zone: UTC+01:00 (CET)
  - Summer (DST): UTC+02:00 (CEST)
- INSEE/Postal code: 09227 /09300
- ^{1} French Land Register data, which excludes lakes, ponds, glaciers > 1 km^{2} (0.386 sq mi or 247 acres) and river estuaries.

Péreille (French pronunciation: [peʁɛj]; Occitan: Perelha) is a commune in the Ariège department in southwestern France.

== Population ==
Inhabitants are called Péreilleois in French.

Historical population
Year	Pop.	±% p.a.
1968	109	—
1975	138	+3.43%
1982	138	+0.00%
1990	199	+4.68%
1999	177	−1.29%
2007	182	+0.35%
2012	207	+2.61%
2017	210	+0.29%
2023	182	−2.36%
Source: INSEE

== See also ==
- Communes of the Ariège department
- Raymond de Péreille
