= Alix André =

French romance novelist

- Born: Alix Caseneuve; 17 April 1909; Lavelanet, Ariège, France
- Died: 6 July 2000 (aged 91); Carcassonne, France
- Occupation: romance novelist
- Spouse: Antoine André
- Children: 3
- Writing career
- Language: French
- Notable works: Notre-Dame des neiges; Lac aux ours
- Notable awards: Prix de l'Académie des jeux floraux; Montyon Prize

Alix André (née, Caseneuve; 17 April 1909 – 6 July 2000) was a French romance novelist. Between 1942 and 1980, she wrote dozens of books, some of which were translated into several other languages or reprinted episodically in women's magazines. She was a recipient of the Prix de l'Académie des jeux floraux and the Montyon Prize. André died in 2000.

== Biography ==
Alix Caseneuve was born on 17 April 1909 in Lavelanet, Ariège. She married Antoine André, owner of the Château de Pech-Latt in Lagrasse, which produced a white wine typical of the Corbières appellation d'origine contrôlée. They had three children, Philippe, Serge and Jacques.

André began writing novels in 1942 for Éditions Tallandier. Her first work, Notre-Dame des neiges, received the Prix de l'Académie des jeux floraux. Through 1980, she wrote around fifty popular romance novels in French, which were translated into several other languages and reprinted episodically in various women's magazines. She won the Montyon Prize in 1951 for Lac aux ours.

Alix André died on 6 July 2000 in Carcassonne.

== Awards ==
- Prix de l'Académie des jeux floraux
- Montyon Prize, 1951

== Selected works ==
1. Notre-Dame des Neiges, 1942
2. Son altesse mon mari, 1944
3. Le Prince blanc, 1946
4. Escale dans la tempête, 1947
5. La Route sans étoiles, 1947
6. Le Chevalier errant, 1947
7. L'Hymne au soleil, 1947
8. Celle qu'on n'attend pas, 1948
9. Le Seigneur de Grunfeld, 1948
10. L'Éternel Passant, 1948
11. La Maison du corsaire, 1950
12. Lac aux ours, 1950
13. Karen, étudiante, 1951
14. L'Homme des solitudes, 1951
15. Tamanova, 1952
16. L'Ennemie, 1953
17. Les loups hurlent, 1953
18. Ordre du prince, 1954
19. Un mariage sans importance, 1954
20. Pour Tessa, 1955
21. Tu seras ma vie, 1955
22. La Dame de Malhanté, 1956
23. La Tornade, 1956
24. L'Héritage des Dunham, 1957
25. On demande un amour, 1957
26. D'or et de feu, 1958
27. Le Maître de Mortcerf,1958
28. L'Écuyer de la reine, 1959
29. Dans l'ombre de Stéphane, 1960
30. Tout l'amour du monde, 1962
31. Ce soir-là à Venise, 1963
32. La Folle Aventure, 1964
33. Mon amour aux yeux clos, 1964
34. Trois roses pour une infante, 1965
35. Mon seigneur de Cornouailles, 1966
36. Un homme venu de la nuit, 1966
37. Ce mal (qu'on) [s']appelle l'amour, 1968
38. La Nuit du Val-Sauvage, 1970
39. Les Cent chevaux du roi, 1971
40. Un jour, mon prince viendra..., 1972
41. Un très brillant pirate, 1974
42. L'Infidèle, 1976
43. Les Neiges d'Offenburg, 1977
44. Le "Concerto de l'Empereur", 1979

(Note: List established from the catalog of Gallica.)
