= Château de Pieusse =

Castle in Occitania

Coordinates: 43°4′50″N 2°13′56.5″E

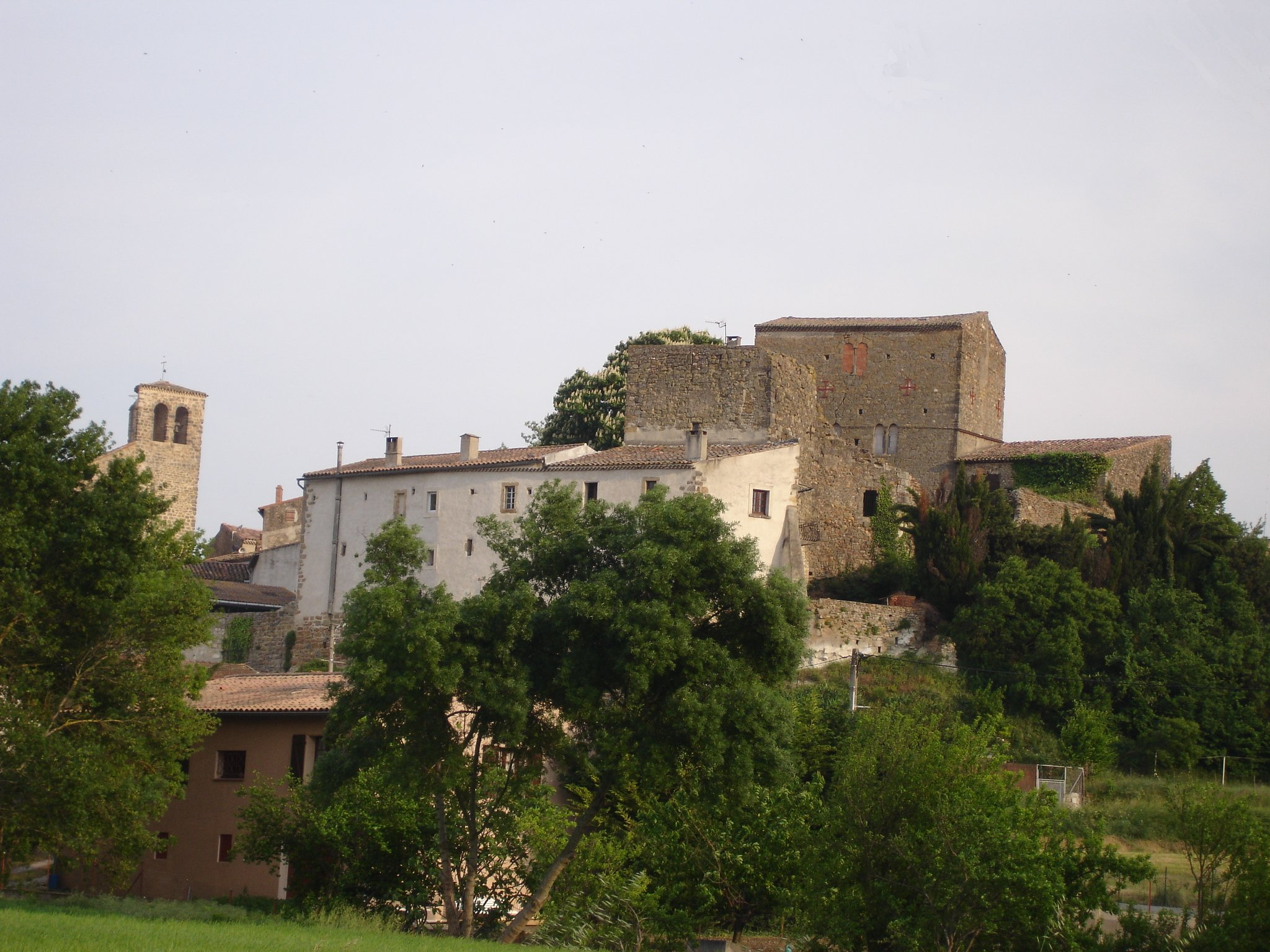
Château de Pieusse

The Château de Pieusse is one of the so-called Cathar castles in the French commune of Pieusse, near the town of Limoux in the département of l'Aude. It is a "true" Cathar castle in the sense that the site was never taken by the French crown during the annexation of Roussillon, but the buildings are mostly of more recent date. It is characterised by a keep, massive for the time, whose use was essentially defensive. The castle is listed as a monument historique by the French Ministry of Culture. It is currently private property and not open to the public.

== History ==
The castle was built in about 1140–1145, under the reign of Louis VII by the Counts of Foix. In 1225, it hosted the Cathar synod, a hundred Perfects presided over by Guilhabert de Castres, bishop of Toulouse. During a meeting at the castle, they decided to create the bishopric of Razes and Benoît de Termes was ordained bishop of this new diocese. In 1229, Bernard Roger, son of the Count of Foix, ceded his fiefdom to the king, Louis IX who joined it to the bishopric of Narbonne. From 1764 to 1790, the castle belonged to Arthur Richard Dillon, last president of the États généraux of Languedoc and Archbishop of Narbonne.

== The present ==
Only a few buildings are visible. Several parts have been reused in other buildings. The north wall is still visible. On the first floor, two elegant twin arched windows with sculptured capitals can be seen. Inside, well-preserved carved stone seats allowed the ladies to see in the distance the arrival of their lords, for this window dominated the whole Aude river valley and the "Razes" countryside. Another twin window, more simple, is found on the second floor. The massive elongated keep, in front, is standing only to the first floor and includes a beautiful arched vault.

== See also ==
- Cathar castles
- List of castles in France
