= Roquefort-les-Cascades =

Commune in Occitanie, France

- Commune
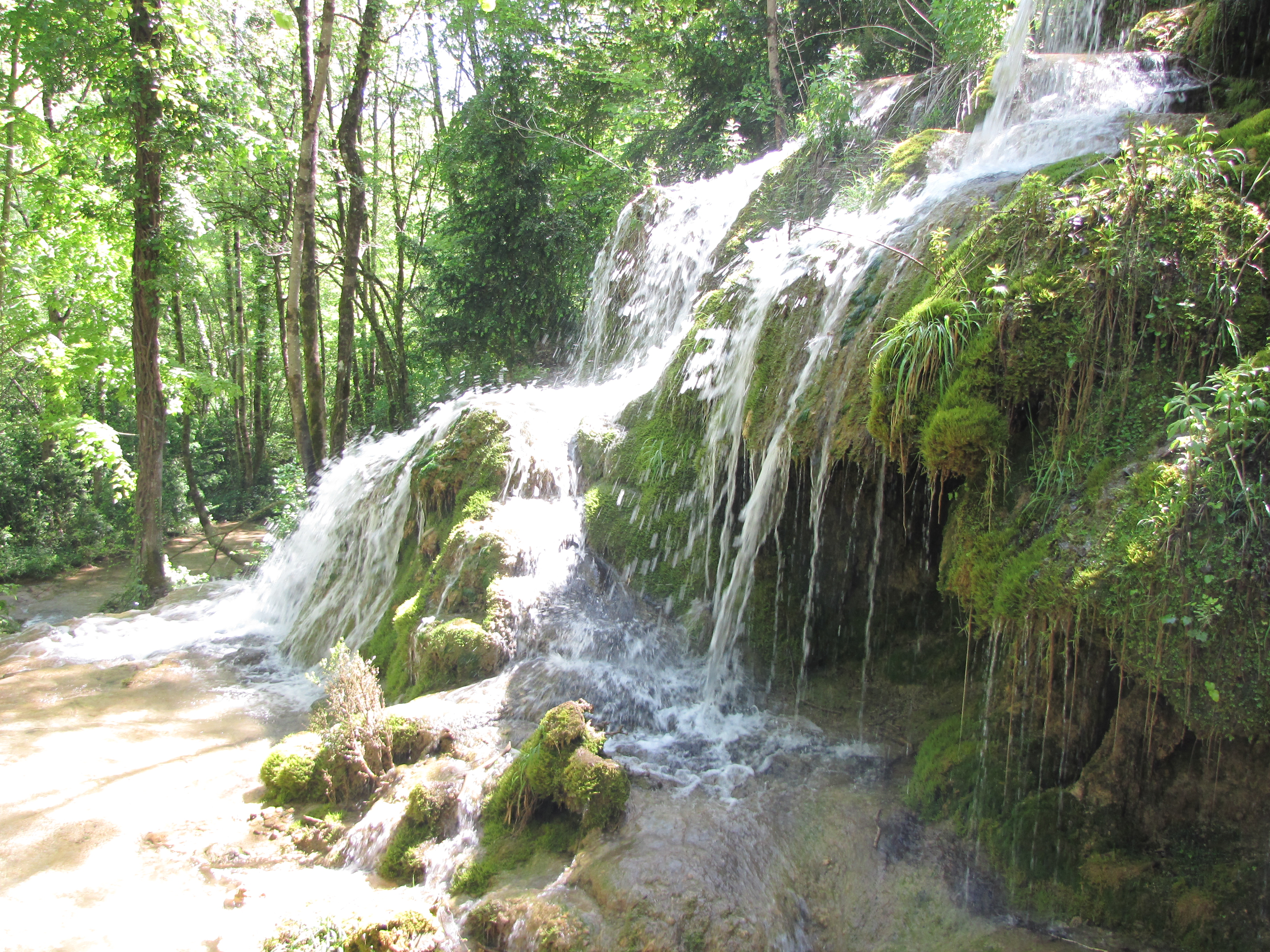
- The La Turasse waterfall

- Coat of arms
- Location of Roquefort-les-Cascades
- Location within France Location within Occitanie
- Coordinates: 42°57′43″N 1°45′24″E
- Country: France
- Region: Occitania
- Department: Ariège
- Arrondissement: Pamiers
- Canton: Pays d'Olmes
- Intercommunality: Pays d'Olmes

Government
  - Mayor (2020–2026): Patrick Cazenave
- Area^{1}: 7.08 km^{2} (2.73 sq mi)
- Elevation: 465 m (1,526 ft)
- Highest elevation: 880 m (2,890 ft)
- Lowest elevation: 433 m (1,421 ft)
- Population (2023): 80
  - Density: 11/km^{2} (29/sq mi)
- Demonym: Roquefortiens
- Time zone: UTC+01:00 (CET)
  - Summer (DST): UTC+02:00 (CEST)
- INSEE/Postal code: 09250 /09300
- ^{1} French Land Register data, which excludes lakes, ponds, glaciers > 1 km^{2} (0.386 sq mi or 247 acres) and river estuaries.

Roquefort-les-Cascades (French pronunciation: [ʁɔkfɔʁ le kaskad]; Occitan: Ròcafòrt) is a commune in the Ariège department in southwestern France.

== Population ==
Inhabitants of Roquefort-les-Cascades are called Roquefortiens in French.

Historical population
Year	Pop.	±% p.a.
1968	115	—
1975	99	−2.12%
1982	105	+0.84%
1990	114	+1.03%
1999	107	−0.70%
2007	101	−0.72%
2012	95	−1.22%
2017	91	−0.86%
2023	80	−2.12%
Source: INSEE

== See also ==
- Communes of the Ariège department
