= Raymond de Péreille =

Occitan nobleman

Raymond de Péreille (Catalan: Ramon de Perella, Occitan: Raimon de Perelha) was an Occitan nobleman who was the lord of the Château de Montségur.

Born about 1186, he rebuilt the destroyed castle after 1204. He married in 1222 and resided in the castle together with his cousin Pierre-Roger de Mirepoix who also became his in-law by marrying Philippa, Raymond's daughter, around 1239. Under Raymond's protection, Guilhabert de Castres set up the center of Catharism at Montségur around 1232.

The fall of Montségur in 1244 ended organized Cathar activity in the Occitan region. Surviving the end of Montségur he was interrogated by the inquisition in May 1244.

== See also ==
- Péreille
