= Lieurac =

Commune in Occitanie, France

- Commune
- Coat of arms
- Location of Lieurac
- Location within France Location within Occitanie
- Coordinates: 42°58′57″N 1°47′24″E
- Country: France
- Region: Occitania
- Department: Ariège
- Arrondissement: Pamiers
- Canton: Pays d'Olmes
- Intercommunality: Pays d'Olmes

Government
  - Mayor (2020–2026): Hadrien Barathieu
- Area^{1}: 6.42 km^{2} (2.48 sq mi)
- Elevation: 365 m (1,198 ft)
- Highest elevation: 671 m (2,201 ft)
- Lowest elevation: 352 m (1,155 ft)
- Population (2023): 181
  - Density: 28.2/km^{2} (73.0/sq mi)
- Time zone: UTC+01:00 (CET)
  - Summer (DST): UTC+02:00 (CEST)
- INSEE/Postal code: 09168 /09300
- ^{1} French Land Register data, which excludes lakes, ponds, glaciers > 1 km^{2} (0.386 sq mi or 247 acres) and river estuaries.

Lieurac (French pronunciation: [ljøʁak]; Occitan: Liurac) is a commune in the Ariège department in southwestern France.

== Population ==
Historical population
| Year | Pop. | ±% p.a. |
|---|---|---|
| 1968 | 128 | — |
| 1975 | 114 | −1.64% |
| 1982 | 104 | −1.30% |
| 1990 | 133 | +3.12% |
| 1999 | 153 | +1.57% |
| 2007 | 150 | −0.25% |
| 2012 | 168 | +2.29% |
| 2017 | 190 | +2.49% |
| 2023 | 181 | −0.81% |
Source: INSEE

== See also ==
- Communes of the Ariège department
