= Montségur =

Commune in Occitanie, France

- Commune
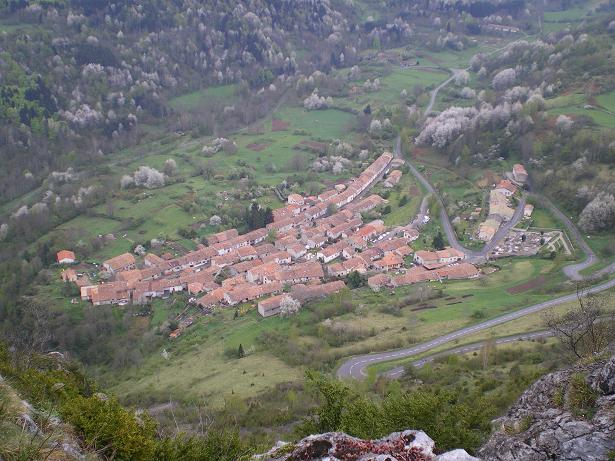
- Montségur seen from the castle

- Coat of arms
- Location of Montségur
- Location within France Location within Occitanie
- Coordinates: 42°52′20″N 1°50′03″E
- Country: France
- Region: Occitania
- Department: Ariège
- Arrondissement: Pamiers
- Canton: Pays d'Olmes

Government
  - Mayor (2020–2026): Nicolas Digoudé
- Area^{1}: 37.16 km^{2} (14.35 sq mi)
- Elevation: 918 m (3,012 ft)
- Highest elevation: 2,365 m (7,759 ft)
- Lowest elevation: 630 m (2,070 ft)
- Population (2023): 116
  - Density: 3.12/km^{2} (8.09/sq mi)
- Time zone: UTC+01:00 (CET)
  - Summer (DST): UTC+02:00 (CEST)
- INSEE/Postal code: 09211 /09300
- ^{1} French Land Register data, which excludes lakes, ponds, glaciers > 1 km^{2} (0.386 sq mi or 247 acres) and river estuaries.

Montségur (French pronunciation: [mɔ̃seɡyʁ]; Languedocien: Montsegur) is a commune in the Ariège department in southwestern France.

It is famous for its fortification, the Château de Montségur, that was built on the "pog" (mountain) on the ruins of one of the last strongholds of the Cathars. The present fortress on the site, though described as one of the "Cathar castles," is from a later period. It has been listed as a historic site by the French Ministry of Culture since 1862. According to the book, Holy Blood, Holy Grail, Montségur was the location of a mythical treasure related to the Holy Grail, which was promptly smuggled away before the Cathar surrender.

== History ==
The earliest signs of settlement in the area date back to the time of the Neanderthals, tens of thousands of years ago.

Evidence of Roman occupation such as Roman currency and tools have also been found in and around the site. The name "Montségur" comes from Latin mons securus ("secure mountain") which evolved into mont ségur in Occitan.

In the year 1204 CE the chateau was fortified to guard the southern frontier.

In the Middle Ages the Montségur region was ruled by the Counts of Toulouse, the Viscounts of Carcassonne and finally the Counts of Foix. In 1243–44, the Cathars (a religious movement considered heretical by the Catholic Church) who had sought refuge at the Montségur fortress were besieged by 10,000 troops, in what is now known as the siege of Montségur. In March 1244, the Cathars finally surrendered and approximately 244 were burned en masse in a bonfire at the foot of the pog when they refused to renounce their faith. Some 25 took the ultimate Cathar vow of consolamentum perfecti in the two weeks before the final surrender. The Inquisitors kept faithful accounts and included the names of many, who are remembered every year on the anniversary of the massacre on 16 March. These names are also displayed at the museum in the village of Montsegur.

== Population ==
Historical population
Year	Pop.	±% p.a.
1968	167	—
1975	143	−2.19%
1982	131	−1.24%
1990	124	−0.68%
1999	117	−0.64%
2007	108	−1.00%
2012	132	+4.10%
2017	119	−2.05%
2023	116	−0.42%
Source: INSEE

== See also ==
- Albigensian Crusade
- Communes of the Ariège department
