= Faidit =

Faidit is an Occitan word meaning 'banished' or 'proscribed'; it is used to denote a lord dispossessed of his land and title.

In historical works it is commonly used in reference to lords in the Languedoc who ran afoul of the Catholic Church during the Albigensian Crusade, who were accused of heresy and had their properties confiscated by the church. Some faidits abandoned their property of their own accord to avoid the crusaders, and it may have been confiscated in absentia later.

Many of the lords took up arms against the crusaders and effectively became outlaws, ambushing crusaders whenever the opportunity presented itself.
