= Arques, Aude =

Commune in Occitanie, France

Arques
- Commune
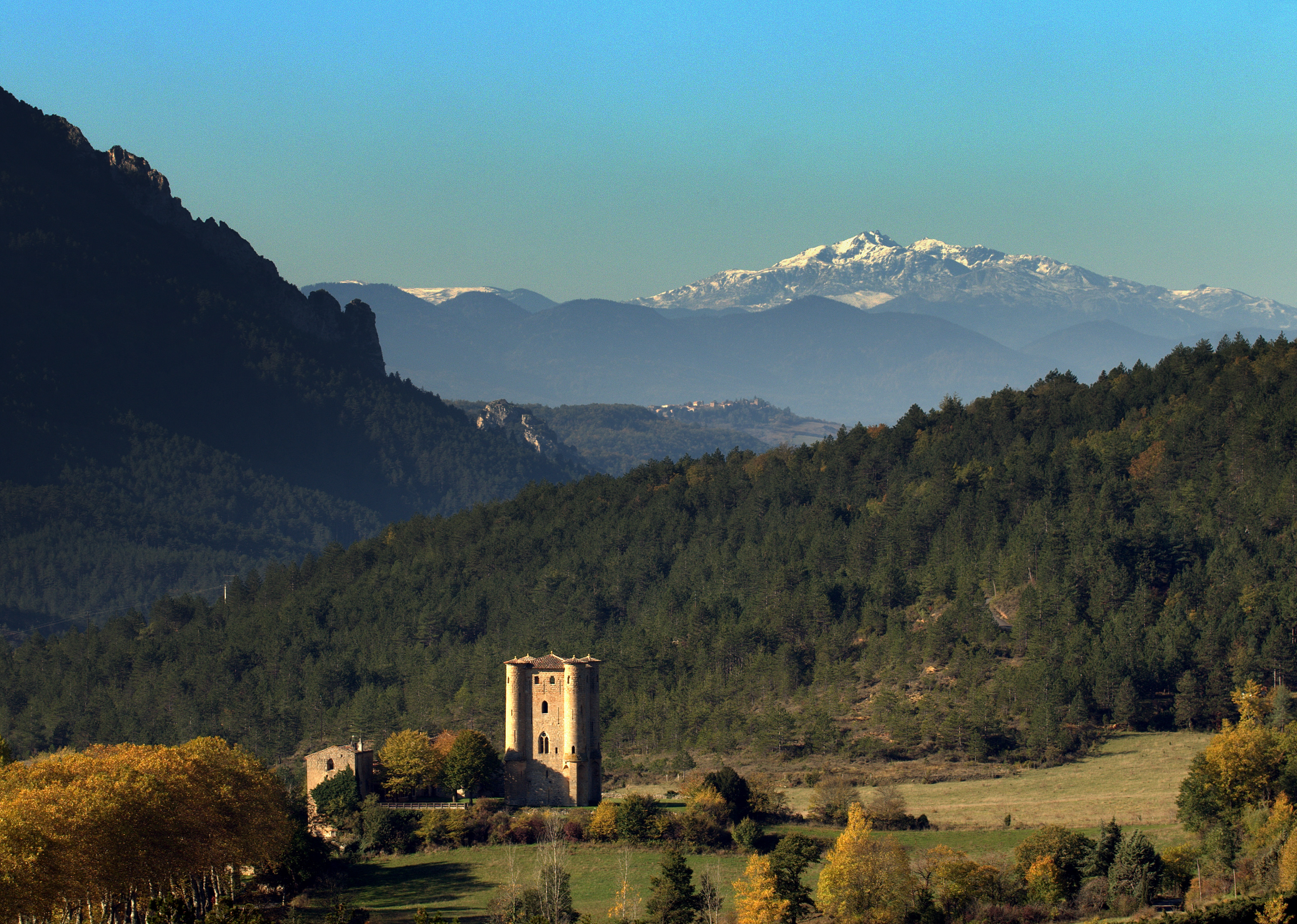
- View of the castle from Arques

- Coat of arms
- Location of Arques
- Location within France Location within Occitanie
- Coordinates: 42°57′12″N 2°22′33″E
- Country: France
- Region: Occitania
- Department: Aude
- Arrondissement: Limoux
- Canton: La Haute-Vallée de l'Aude
- Intercommunality: CC Limouxin

Government
  - Mayor (2020–2026): Géraldine Gracia
- Area^{1}: 18.53 km^{2} (7.15 sq mi)
- Elevation: 356 m (1,168 ft)
- Highest elevation: 854 m (2,802 ft)
- Lowest elevation: 329 m (1,079 ft)
- Population (2023): 248
  - Density: 13.4/km^{2} (34.7/sq mi)
- Time zone: UTC+01:00 (CET)
  - Summer (DST): UTC+02:00 (CEST)
- INSEE/Postal code: 11015 /11190
- ^{1} French Land Register data, which excludes lakes, ponds, glaciers > 1 km^{2} (0.386 sq mi or 247 acres) and river estuaries.

Arques (French pronunciation: [aʁk]; Languedocien: Arcas) is a commune in the Aude department in the Occitanie region of southern France.

== Geography ==
Arques is located in the Pyrénées mountains some 25 km south-east of Limoux and 25 km north-east of Quillan. Access to the commune is by the D613 road from Serres in the west passing through the village and continuing to Albières in the east. The D54 goes north from the village to Valmigère. At the commune border the D70 branches from the D54 and follows a tortuous route to Bouisse. The commune is an alpine commune with rugged terrain but with some farms in the valley.

The Rialsesse river flows through the centre of the commune and the village from east to west gathering many tributaries. In the south the Ruisseau de Lait, with many tributaries rising in the commune, flows north-west into the Lac d'Arques (Arques Lake) which feeds the Rialsesse.

== History ==
The area was owned by the Abbey of Lagrasse in the early 11th century, before coming under the control of the Lords of Termes. In 1231 the region was given by Simon de Montfort to Pierre de Voisins after the Albigensian Crusade. His successor, Gilles de Voisins, began the construction of the castle in 1280 and the organization of the Bastide. It was the northern barons who came to occupy the land of the Cathar heretics under the order of Pope Innocent III. The dynasty of Voisins was extinguished in 1518 with the marriage of Françoise with Jean de Joyeuse, a member of the House of Joyeuse who therefore became the owner of the lordship and barony of Arques. Arques castle was abandoned in favour of the Château des Ducs de Joyeuse (Castle of the Dukes of Joyeuse) in Couiza. Lords and barons of Arques-barons were hereditary barons of Languedoc (Pays d'états) and had a permanent seat in the Estates of Languedoc.

=== Heraldry ===
Arms of the Commune of Arques	This design is the interpretation of Henri Sivade Commune of Arques Blazon: Vert, Party per fess Argent chapé chaussé of one in the other.

Arms of Hozier	The Armorial of General d'Hozier shows this picture which can be emblazoned as follows: Blazon: Party per fess, Vert and Argent, vêtu of one in the other.

== Administration ==
List of Successive Mayors

From	To	Name	Party
1977	2014	Henri Barbaza	PS
2014	2014	Maxime Barbaza	
2014	2020	Audrey Cabedo	
2020	2026	Géraldine Gracia	

== Demography ==
The inhabitants of the commune are known as Arquois or Arquoises in French.

Historical population

Year	Pop.	±% p.a.
1793	460	—
1821	506	+0.34%
1846	601	+0.69%
1872	542	−0.40%
1901	504	−0.25%
1926	326	−1.73%
1946	284	−0.69%
1962	235	−1.18%
1968	210	−1.86%

Year	Pop.	±% p.a.
1975	190	−1.42%
1982	201	+0.81%
1990	210	+0.55%
1999	199	−0.60%
2007	260	+3.40%
2012	252	−0.62%
2017	254	+0.16%
2023	248	−0.40%

Source: EHESS and INSEE

== Sites and monuments ==
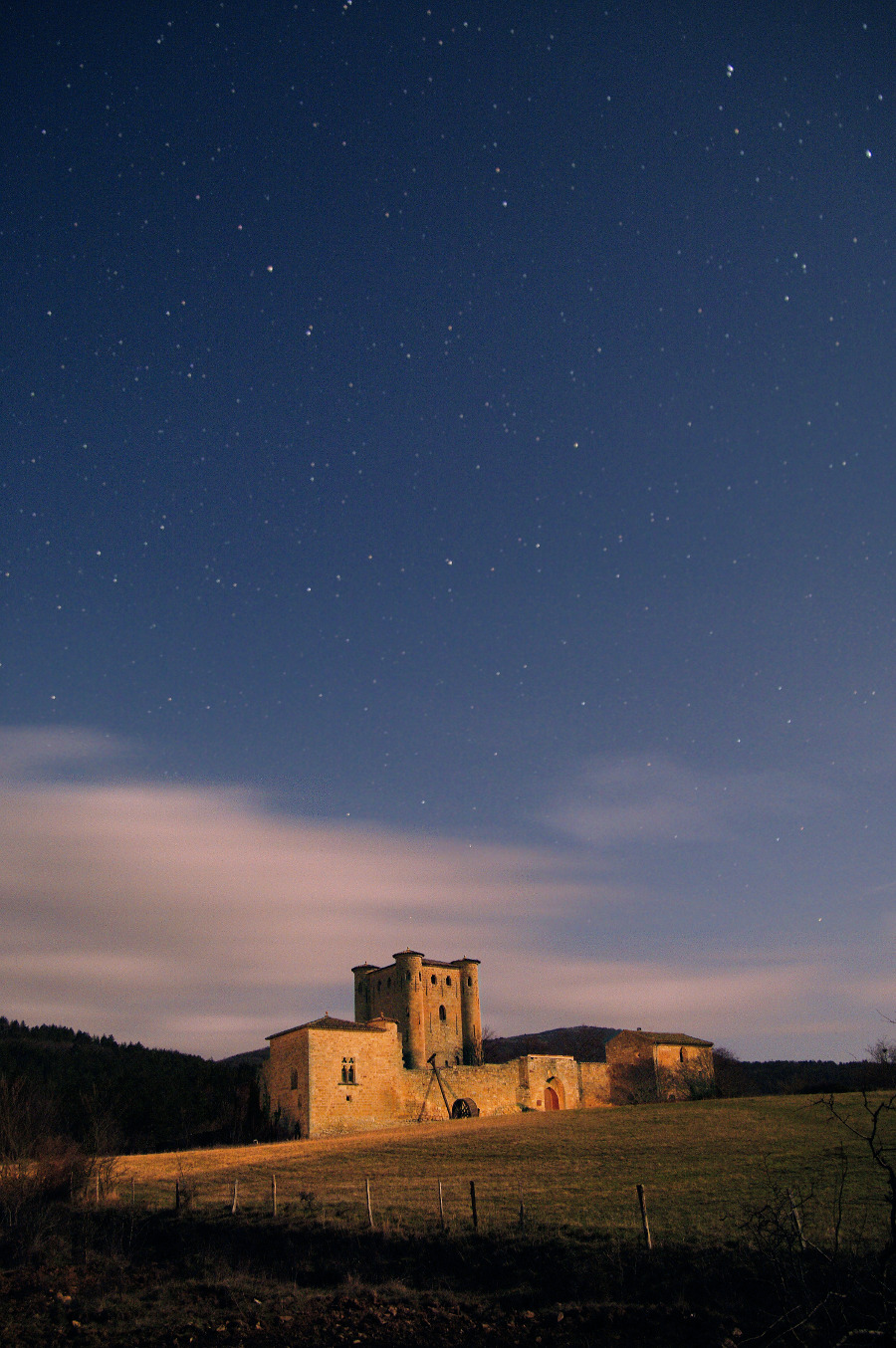
Château d'Arques at night

The commune has two sites that are registered as historical monuments:

- The Arques Iron Cross (14th century)
- The Château d'Arques (14th century)

Other sites of interest

- The Déodat Roché House converted into an exhibition on Catharism
- The Arboretum du Planel
- A Sculpture of the Head of a Cleric (15th century) is registered as an historical object.
- The Church contains several items that are registered as historical objects:
  - A Group Sculpture: Saint Anne, Virgin and child (14th century)
  - A Tabernacle and Altar seating in the south side chapel (17th century)
  - A Cross (14th century)
  - An Altar Cross and 6 Candlesticks (18th century)
  - A Retable and Tabernacle in the south side chapel (17th century)

Chateau d'Arques Picture Gallery

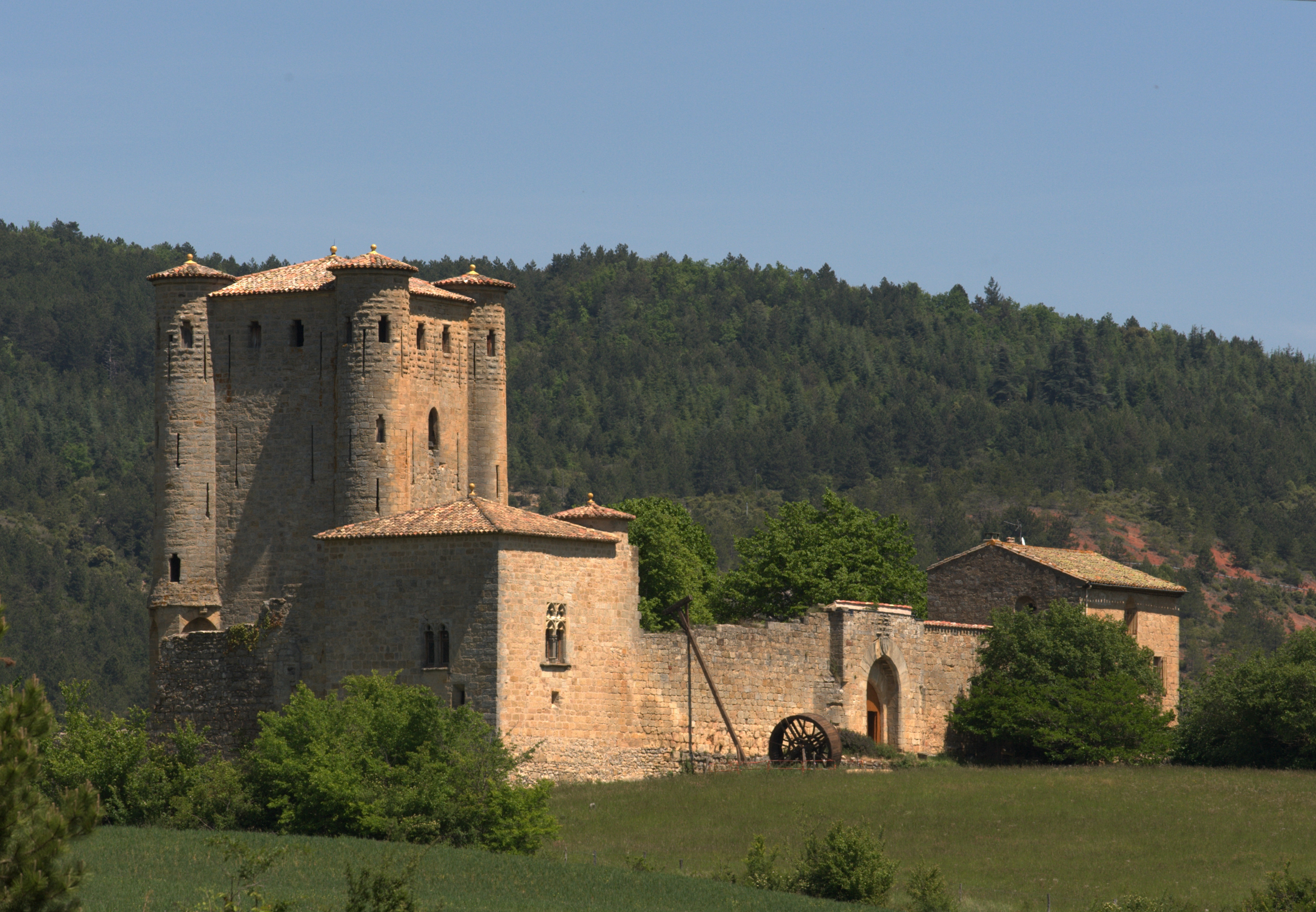
The chateau

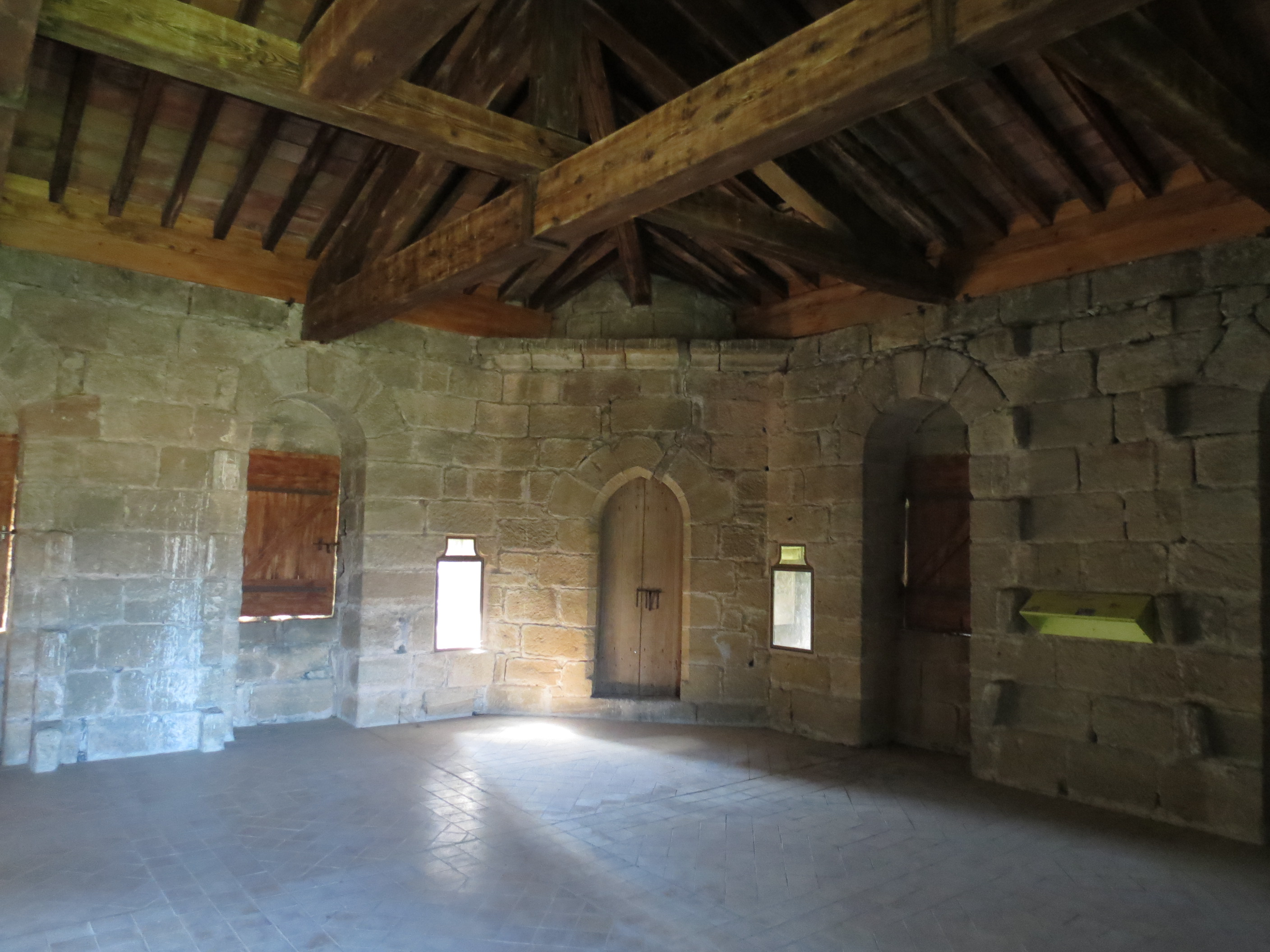
Interior

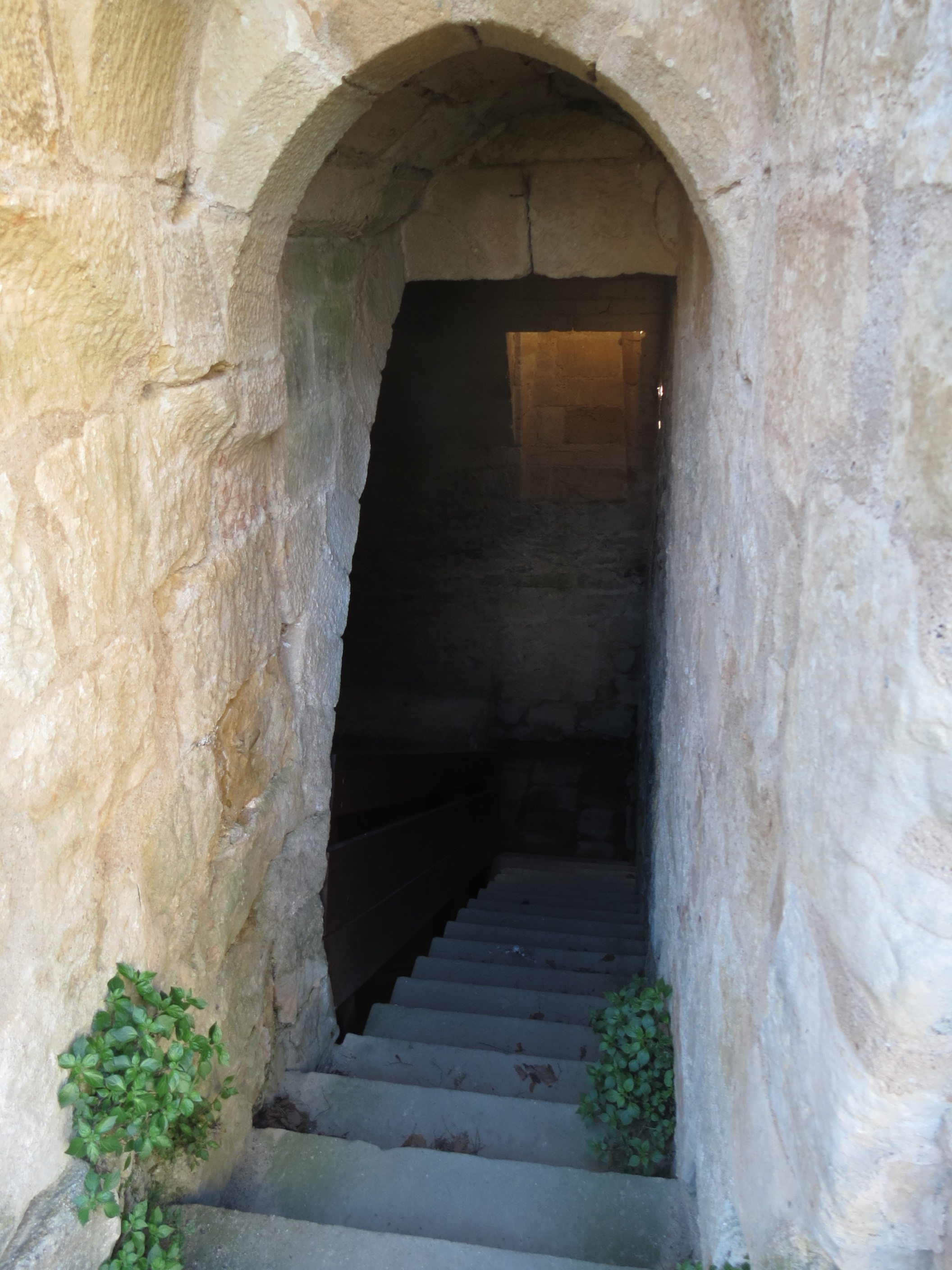
A door

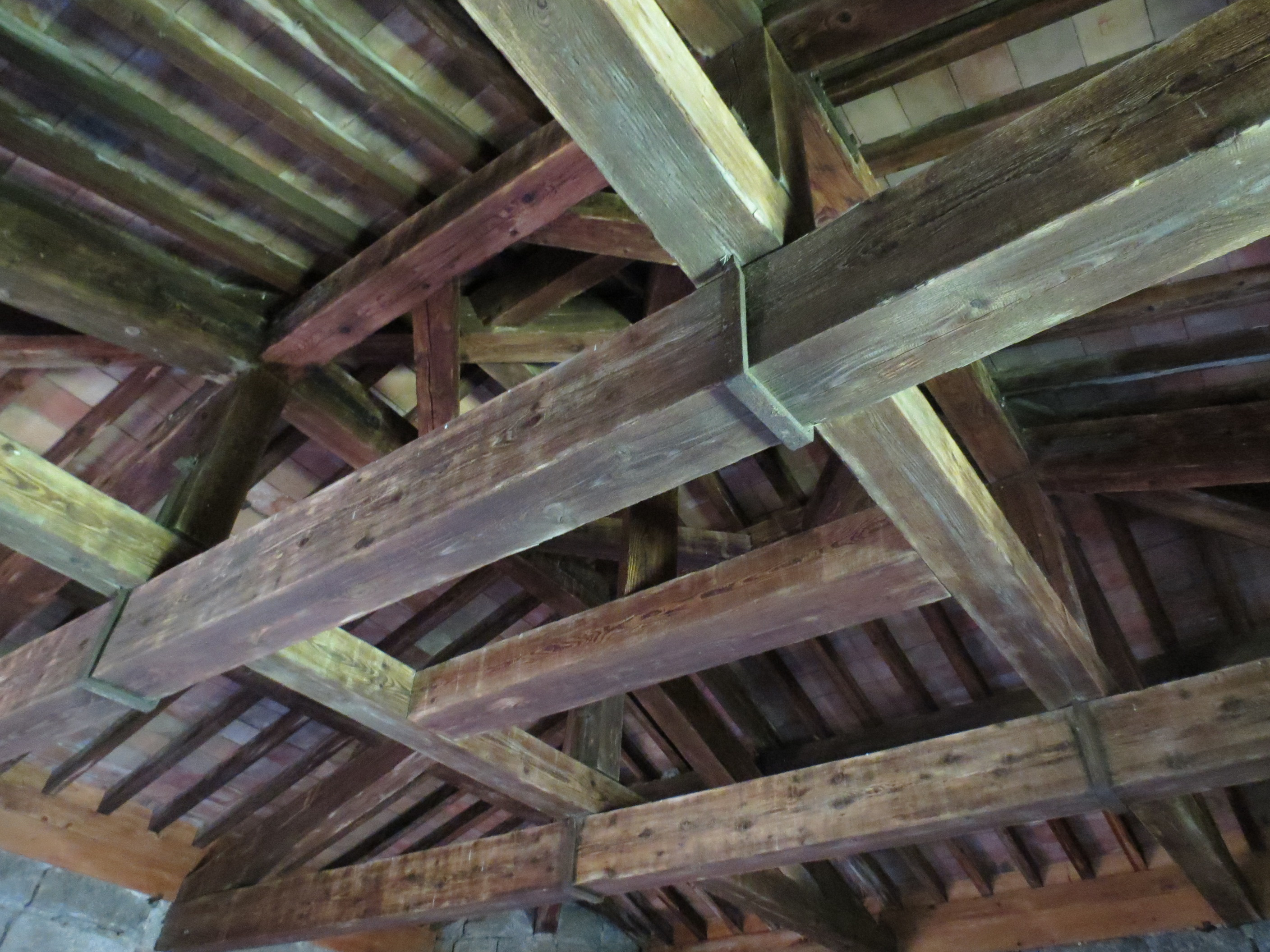
The ceiling

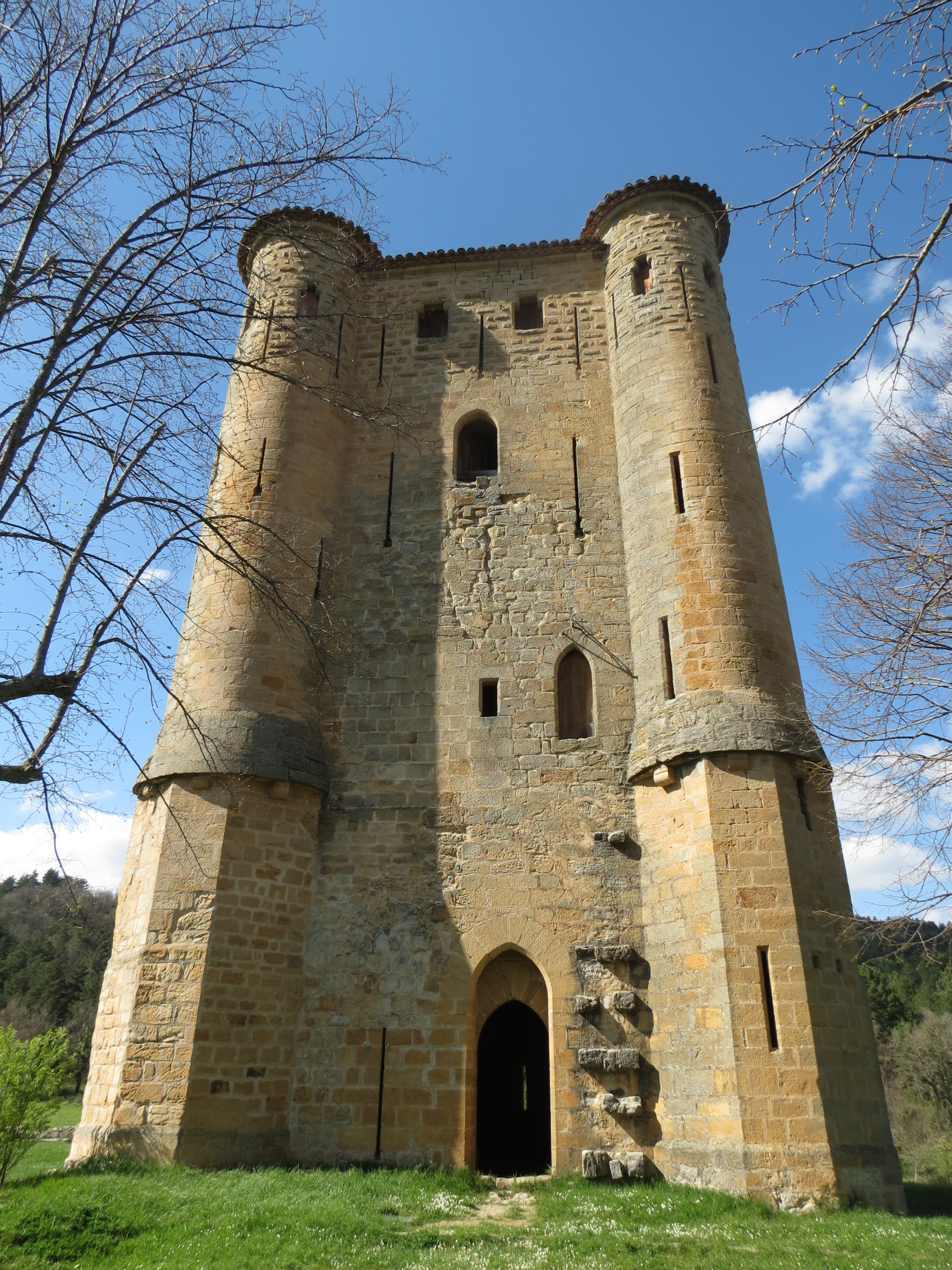
The keep

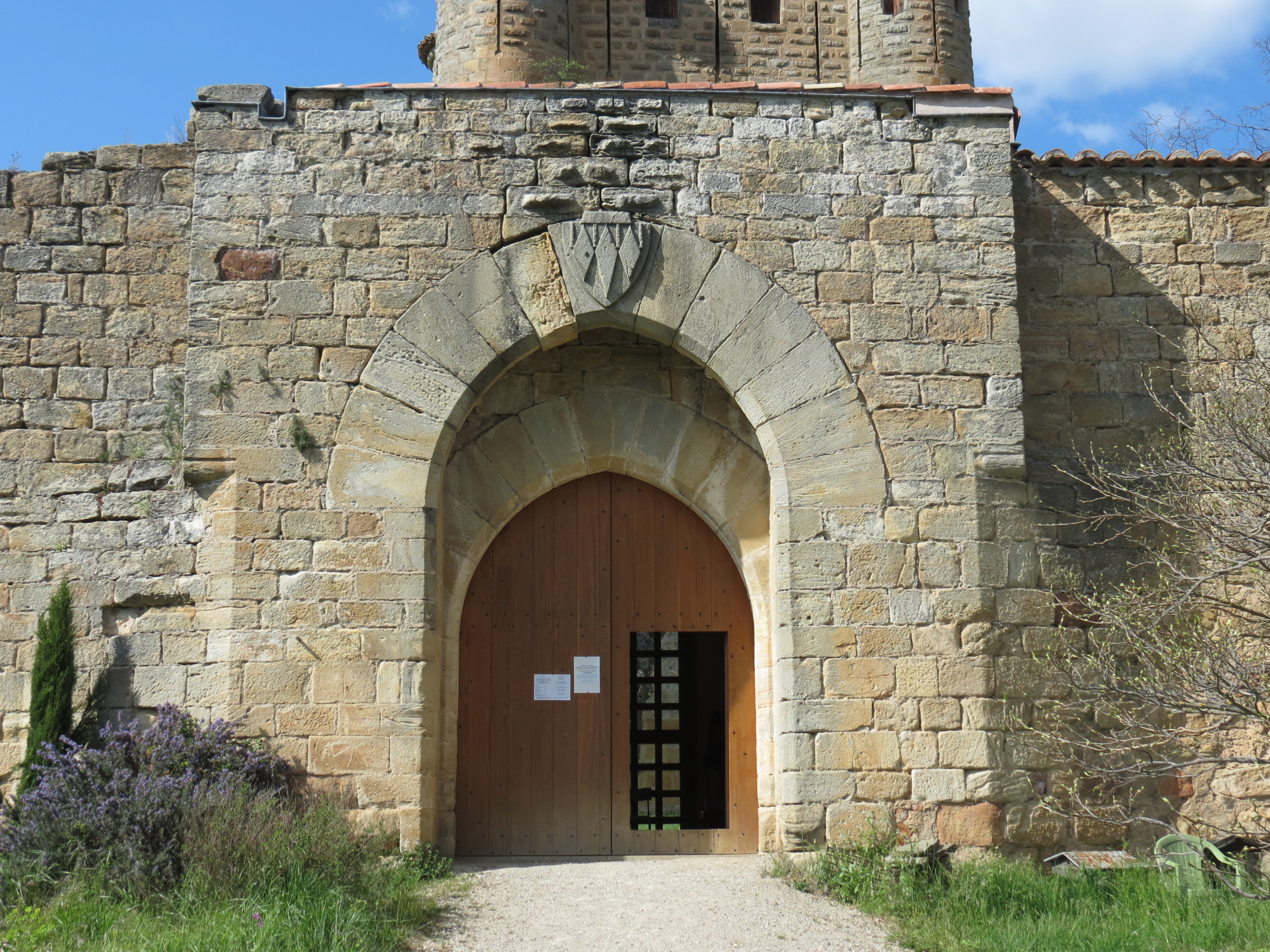
The entrance

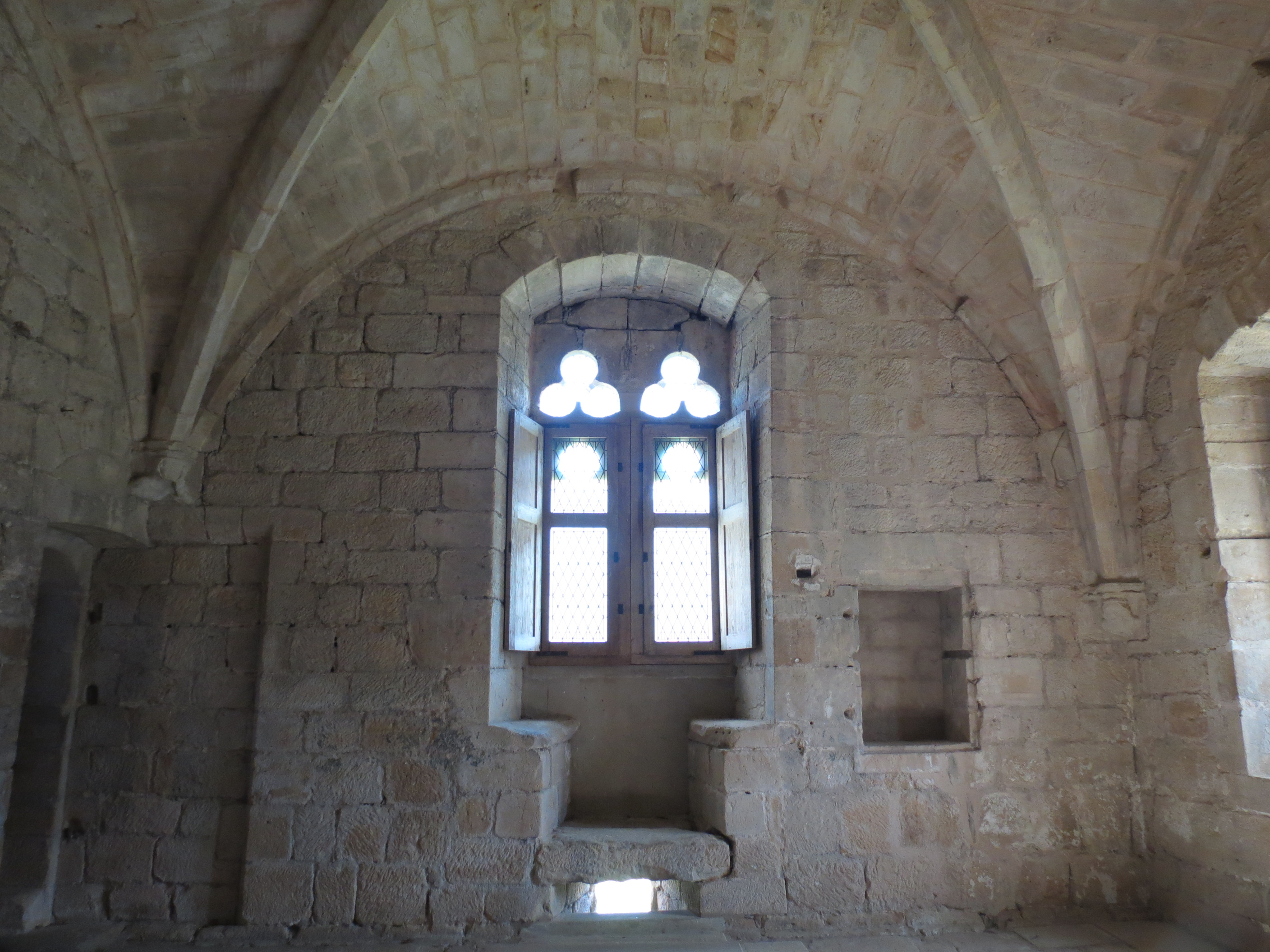
Windows

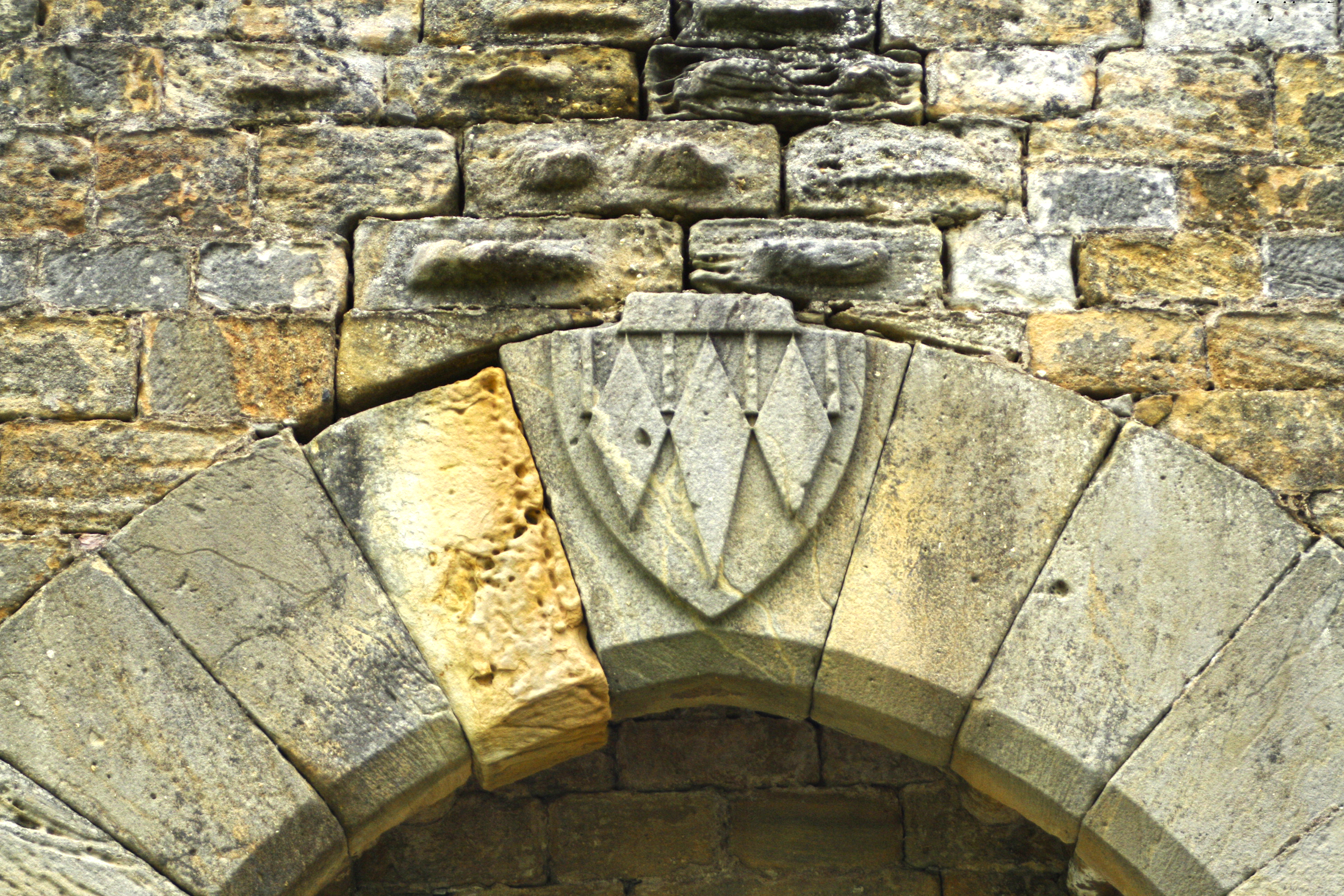
Arch

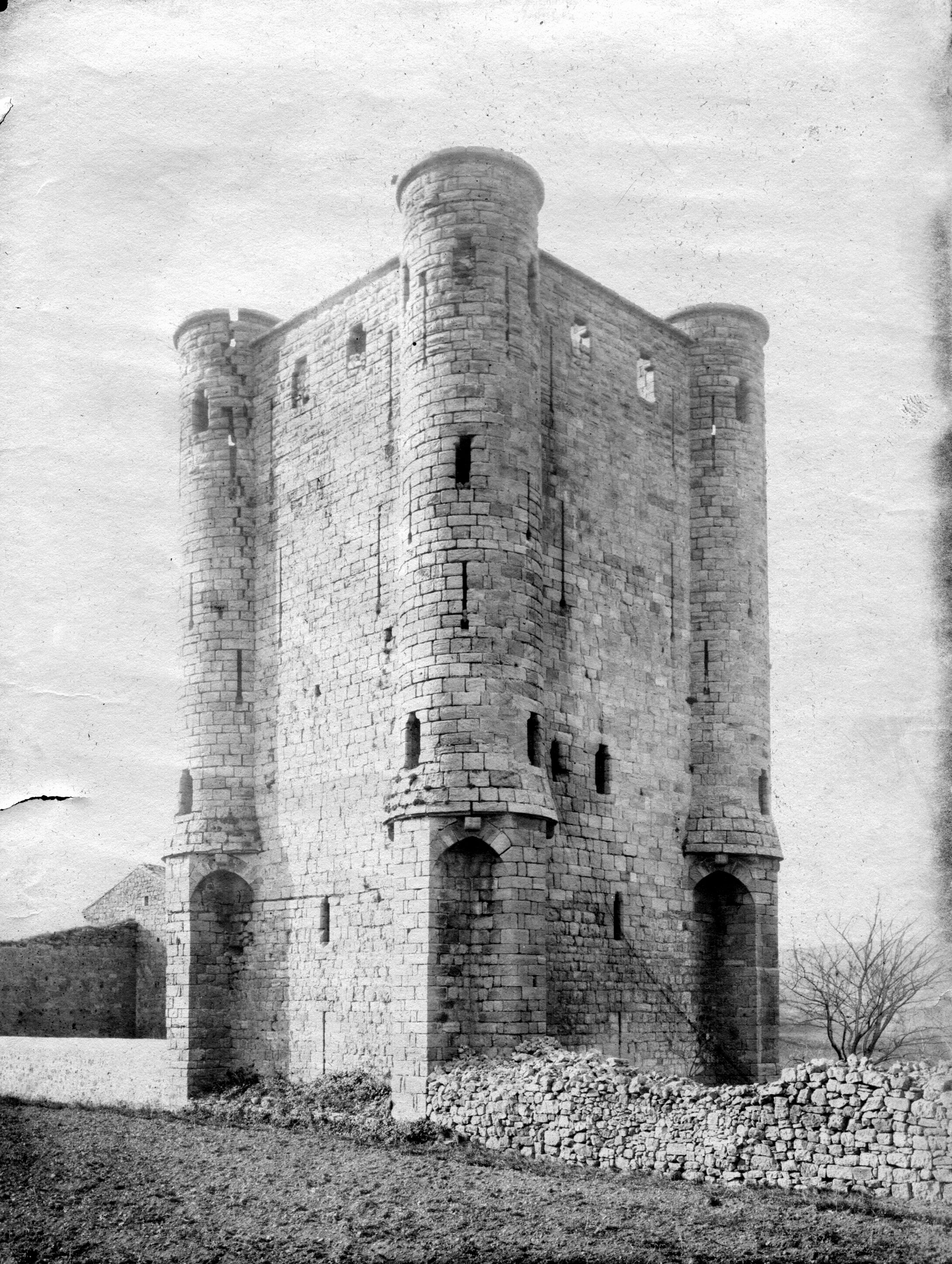
The keep in the 19th century

== Notable people linked to the commune ==
- Pierre de Voisins (1177–1233), Lord of Voisins-le-Bretonneux, then Limoux, Arques, Reddes, Caderonne, Couiza, and Bugarach. In 1191 he went on the Third Crusade. In 1209 he took part in the Albigensian Crusade. Lieutenant of Simon de Montfort who entrusted him with several lordships in Carcassonne and Razes after the fall of the Château de Termes. He was Baron of Arques.
- Anne de Joyeuse (1560/1-1587), Baron of Arques, Viscount then Duke of Joyeuse.
- Déodat Roché, born on 13 December 1877 at Arques, died on 12 January 1978, historian of Catharism, magistrate, philosopher, anthroposopher, freemason.
- Victor Boffelli, born on 20 March 1947 at Arques, French rugby player

== See also ==
- Communes of the Aude department
