= Château de Saint-Ferriol =

Castle in Saint-Ferriol, Aude, France

Château St-Ferriol
- Saint-Ferriol, Aude, France
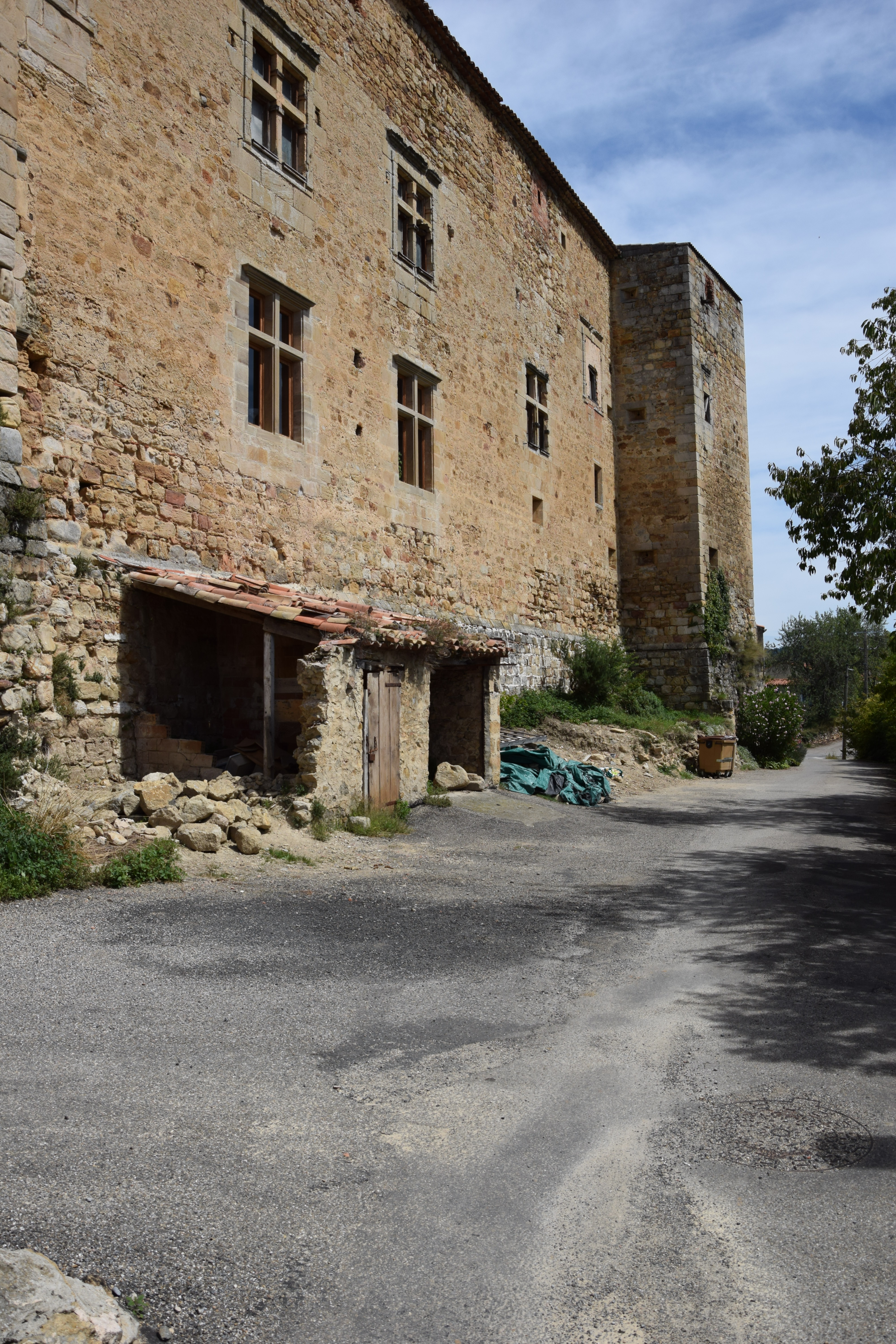

Site information
- Type: Castle
- Owner: Barons de St-Ferriol (first owners)
- Controlled by: Private company
- Open to the public: No
- Condition: Undergoing restoration

Location
- Château St-Ferriol
- Location within France
- Coordinates: 42.89177°N 2.22473°E

Site history
- Built: 16th century
- Built by: Barons de St-Ferriol
- Materials: Stone
- Battles/wars: Wars of Religion (1562–98)

The Château de Saint-Ferriol (or Château Saint-Ferriol) is a late medieval - early Renaissance castle, in the village and commune of Saint-Ferriol, in the Aude département in southern France. It is situated on a ridge, overlooking valleys to the north and south, in the heart of the village of St-Ferriol, near the towns of Quillan and Esperaza.

The castle was listed (inscrit) as a monument historique by the French Ministry of Culture in 1999. It is currently undergoing renovation.

== Architecture ==
According to the Ministry of Culture website, the Château de Saint-Ferriol is a château-fort (castle). The current building was built in the end of the 16th or the beginning of the 17th century, which is towards the end of the period of medieval castle building when gunpowder and firearms had rendered traditional castle building techniques obsolete, and castles were still being built only in remote areas where local wars (The Wars of Religion) still raged.

The earliest mention of the château de Saint-Ferriol dates from 1155. The present castle replaced the older structure perhaps in the second half of the sixteenth century. The château is composed of a rectangular three-storey building with two wings to the east and west, partially destroyed, and a wall to the north enclosing the inner courtyard.The original principal entrance gate was in the east wing.

The structure was built at the high point of the village and dominates the immediate surrounding area. The castle features six monumental fireplaces and another on the top floor decorated with a coat of arms, a mention of " Noble Anne de Mauleon " and the date 1630. On the coat of arms in relief is a lion passant (de Mauleon) impaled with a castle of three towers (de Plaigne). The castle is an important witness to the architecture of the period.

Like other castles in the area it is located at the highest point of a village, next to the church. The village would have built up around it. The Château de Saint-Ferriol used the latest military techniques of the period, notably bastions placed at the four corners of a rectangular building enclosing an inner court. These bastions are furnished with gun ports (cannoniers) to provide covering fire to all external walls. These cannoniers were the logical successors to traditional loopholes or arrowslits. It was probably modelled in part on the nearby Château des Ducs de Joyeuse and built soon afterwards.

Later changes, made around 1600 made the building a more comfortable residence. Most of the old medieval windows were replaced by the latest Renaissance style mullioned windows, providing much more light. A few medieval windows survive. A new stone staircase was put in, and the six monumental fireplaces were built.

Very little seems to have happened to the castle since this time, except that it seems to have been partitioned into two, once in the seventeenth century, and then again in the early twentieth century. There are a large number of architectural puzzles - walls that are clearly not original, others that appear to predate the present building, no sign of a well, certain work carried out in a different stone, an external door on the first floor leading nowhere, a particularly unusual fireplace on the top floor, and so on.

The fabric of the building has suffered badly since the French Revolution, and the building had not been occupied since the early twentieth century. It was used as a farm building for many years, and two of the bastions were used as quarries for village houses. One wing, the old presbytery, fell down in the early twentieth century.

The castle is now undergoing a long programme of restoration, the objective being to return it, as far as possible, to its state in around 1600, using original materials and techniques.

== History ==
Relatively little is known about the history of the Château de Saint-Ferriol. Local records were lost in a fire in the early eighteenth century, and whatever remained seems to have been deliberately destroyed during the French Revolution. The few remaining records and architectural clues, a reasonably good outline of the history of the seigneurie, village and Château de Saint-Ferriol.

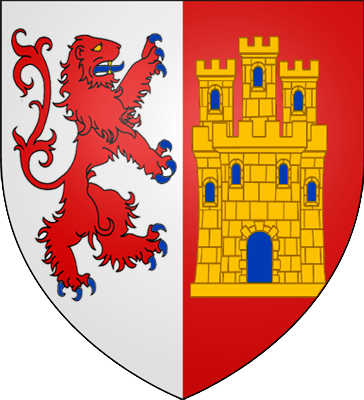
The impaled arms of de Mauleon and de Plaigne, as represented on a chimney at the Château de Saint Ferriol, dating from 1630.

Some buildings existed on the present site before 1300, but the principal castle at that period was some distance away along a ridge called Le Dent. This castle seems to have fallen into disuse after the Cathar period, and according to a strong local tradition the present castle was built from stones removed from the old one.

From architectural clues, the present building has been dated to around 1570. The original style appears to have been late medieval - not that unusual in this area even at such a late date. The barons of Saint-Ferriol were caught up in the Wars of Religion soon after the castle was built, and it is possible that the building was damaged in those wars as it was comprehensively restructured soon after, around 1600, in the early Renaissance style.

Notarial records provide information about the barons of Saint-Ferriol, the family that built the castle. Their name was de Plaigne and their ancestors had been key participants in some of the major events of the Cathar Crusades. One of the few documents to survive is a letter from the executors of one of the Barons de Saint-Ferriol, dated 1588 addressed to the local authorities, explaining that "françois de plaigne siegneur de st-ferriol", had died fighting in the wars, pointing out that his castle was now ungarded as his eldest child was only five years old, emphasising the castle's strategic importance in a raging war zone, and asking the local commander to provide a garrison.

The family died out in the following century, after which the castle passed through a number of hands, without ever being refurbished. It therefore retains many original features, and it was for this reason that it was listed as a monument historique at the end of the twentieth century.

== See also ==
- List of castles in France
- Liste des monuments historiques de l'Aude in French Wikipedia
- Monuments historique inscrit en 1999 in French Wikipedia
