= Déodat Roché =

French magistrate, philosopher, anthroposophist, freemason and historian of Catharism

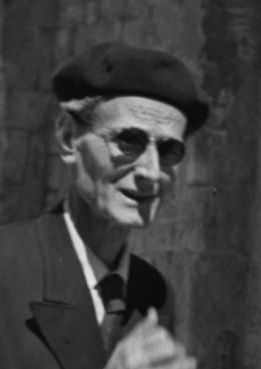
Déodat Roché

Déodat Roché (13 December 1877 – 12 January 1978) was a French magistrate, philosopher, anthroposophist, freemason and historian of Catharism. He promoted a Cathar-influenced anthroposophy which was influenced by Druidism, Gnosticism and Hinduism.

== Life ==
=== Early career ===
Born in Arques, he became preoccupied with esoteric and spiritual questions at a young age. From 1890 onwards he and his father studied contemporary occult authors such as Fabre d'Olivet, Papus, Édouard Schuré, Paul Sédir, Allan Kardec and Fabre des Essarts. Aged 14 he learned of the Albigensian Crusade in his region of France, leading to an interest in the history and doctrines of the Cathars.

In 1896 he joined Papus' "Groupe indépendant d'études ésotériques" and began corresponding with Sédir. In 1898 he was initiated into the Martinist Order by doctor Louis-Sophrone Fugairon and in 1899 joined Jules Doinel's Gnostic Church of France, in which he was ordained a deacon in 1901 and bishop of Carcassonne under the title "His Greatness Tau Theodotos" in 1903. However, he distanced himself from the Gnostic Church soon afterwards, finding their teachings too fixed.

After gaining a licentiate in law and became a lawyer in 1901, in his spare time gaining another licentiate, this time in philosophy with a final thesis in 1903 entitled Plotin a-t-il simplifié le système des Valentiniens? ("Did Plotinus simplify the Valentinian system?"). Whilst still studying in Toulouse, he collaborated with doctor Louis Sophrone Fugairon (another member of the Gnostic Church as "Tau Sophronius") to found the review Le Réveil des Albigeois. It was renamed La Gnose moderne in 1901 but stopped publication before 1904 after some exchanges with M. Rappaport's Viennese review Die Gnosis.

He became a magistrate in 1906, initially in Limoux then in Carcassonne, but continued to contribute to philosophical reviews and spirituality associations such as the "Société de culture morale et de recherches psychiques". He was also initiated into "Les Vrais amis réunis", a Grand Orient de France Masonic lodge in Carcassonne, becoming a Worshipful Master and remaining a member for the rest of his life.

=== 1920 onwards ===
In 1921 he discovered the work of Rudolf Steiner, writing to him in November that year and meeting him at Dornach in September 1922. He became a member of the Anthroposophical Society and in 1924 a member of the Université libre de la science de l'esprit. He joined the tribunal at Castelnaudary in 1923, becoming its vice-president in 1935 and its president in 1939. He was elected mayor of Arques in 1925 but was dismissed from that role ten years later. His career as a magistrate was interrupted by the Vichy regime due to his membership of a Masonic lodge, though as he was not then an active Mason he falsely claimed he was solely interested in spiritism and the history of religion. The regime also dismissed him as a magistrate in 1941, though he remained in Béziers until his automatic retirement in 1943. He was elected counsellor-general for the canton of Couiza in 1945 after the liberation of France but left politics for good in 1946 to fully devote himself to his research on Catharism.

In 1948 he became the founding president of the "Congrès d'études cathares" (or "Congrès de la société du souvenir et des études cathares"), René Nelli and Fanita de Pierrefeu. In autumn the same year he edited the first issue of the quarterly review Cahiers d'études cathares and in April 1950 founded the "Société du souvenir et des études cathares", with Resistance heroine Lucienne Julien as secretary general and then (after Roché's death) president. Simone Hannedouche actively collaborated with Roché on Études cathares from 1949 to 1971. Roché founded the publisher éditions des Cahiers d'études cathares at Narbonne in 1951 and also collaborated with Julien, who was herself the founder and maintainer of the "Souvenir et des Études Cathares" association in Arques, later renamed the association for "Spiritualité cathare", of which she remained secretary general and then president until her death. Julien stayed friends with Fanita de Pierrefeu, an author whose "fine spirits" for historical and philosophical research was based at the Hestia in Montségur and later at Auzat in the shadow of Montréal-de-Sos below Sem in Ariège.

Roché was surrounded by many authors and searchers of all tendencies, including his friend René Nelli. From 1956 onwards Roché, Julien and Hannedouche organised annual summer camps for the "Société du souvenir et d'études cathares" at Estagnol in the Rialsès valley in the Hautes-Corbières. It became a place of meeting, exchange, communal life and conferences, with each day starting with a meditation before sunrise. The camps also involved presentations by Roché and Hannedouche (with the former often referring to Steiner and Peter Deunov), music, singing, Paneurhythmy and painting, gathering a large number of people motivated by spiritual research. Roché and the "Société du souvenir et des études cathares" placed a commemorative stele at the foot of the pog of Montségur on 21 May 1961, a copy of a Cathar monument in Le Lauragais, with an Occitan inscription Als Catars, als martirs del pur amor crestian ("To the Cathars, to the martyrs for pure Christian love"). Roché died in Arques and his house in the town centre has since 1996 housed a display on Catharism.

== Selected works ==
- Gnose antique et pensée moderne (1904-1906), Cahiers d'études cathares, Société du Souvenir et des Études cathares, Narbonne, no. 93, spring 1982, p. 5-41.
- Contes et légendes du catharisme, 1949, Éditions des Cahiers d'études cathares, Arques (Aude); 2e éd. 1951, 40 p.; 3e éd. augmentée 1966 79 p.
- Études manichéennes et cathares, 1952, Éditions des Cahiers d'études cathares, 268 p.
- Mission future de la Russie. Mission actuelle de l'Occitanie (brochure), Cahiers d'études cathares, 1953, 22 p.
- Catharisme et science spirituelle (brochure), Éditions des Cahiers d'études cathares, I, no. 22, 1955, p. 91-108.
- Survivance et immortalité de l'âme. Fantômes des vivants et des morts, vies successives, corps lumineux de résurrection, 1955; 2e éd. augmentée 1962, Cahiers d'études cathares, 270 p.
- Évolution individuelle et harmonie sociale (brochure), Éditions des Cahiers d'études cathares, conférence de 1956, 16 p.
- Le Catharisme, son développement dans le midi de la France, et les croisades contre les Albigeois, 1937, 29 p.
- Le Catharisme. Nouvelle édition revue et augmentée, 1947, 206 p.
- Le Catharisme, tome I, Éditions des Cahiers d'études cathares, Carcassonne, 1957, 225 p. (comprend des parties des Études manichéennes et cathares [1952], une partie du Catharisme [1947], Spiritualité de l'hérésie : le catharisme [1954], divers articles).
- Le Catharisme, tome II, Cahiers d'études cathares, numéro hors série, 1976, 145 p. (comprend des parties du Catharisme, diverses communications).
- L'Église romaine et les Cathares albigeois, Éditions des Cahiers d'études cathares, 1957, 206 p.; 3e éd. augmentée 1969, 327 p.
- Résurgence du manichéisme : Ismaéliens, Cathares, Rose-Croix, "Société du souvenir et des études cathares", 1981, 68 p.
- Saint Augustin et les manichéens de son temps, in Cahiers d'études cathares, printemps 1989, XLe année, no. 121, p. 3-33.

== Bibliography (in French) ==
- Lucienne Julien, Hommage à Déodat Roch, in: Renaissance Traditionnelle, N. 36, octobre 1978, p. 276-279.
- Jean-Pierre Bonnerot, Déodat Roché et l'Église gnostique, in: Cahiers d'études cathares, numéro spécial, 11190 Arques (Aude), 1982.
- Lucienne Julien, Cathares et Catharismes, Ed. Dangles, Paris, 1990.
- Jean-Philippe Audouy, Déodat Roché « Le Tisserand des catharismes », Impressions du pays cathare, 1997, 254 p.
- José Dupré, Un Cathare au XXe siecle : Déodat Roché (1877-1978), La Clavellerie, 24650 Chancelade (Dordogne), 2001, 415 p.
