= Arboretum du Planel =

Arboretum and nature preserve in Languedoc-Roussillon, France

Coordinates: 42.95°N 2.372°E

The Arboretum du Planel is an arboretum and nature preserve located near the Château d'Arques in Arques, Aude, Languedoc-Roussillon, France. It is open daily without charge.

The arboretum was established in 1933 as a nursery for Eaux et Forêts, and is today a nature preserve with good hiking trails. It contains mature specimens of American red oak, Atlas Cedar, Ginkgo biloba, Liriodendron tulipifera, Sequoiadendron, and other plants.

== See also ==
- List of botanical gardens in France
