= Albières =

Commune in Occitanie, France

- Commune
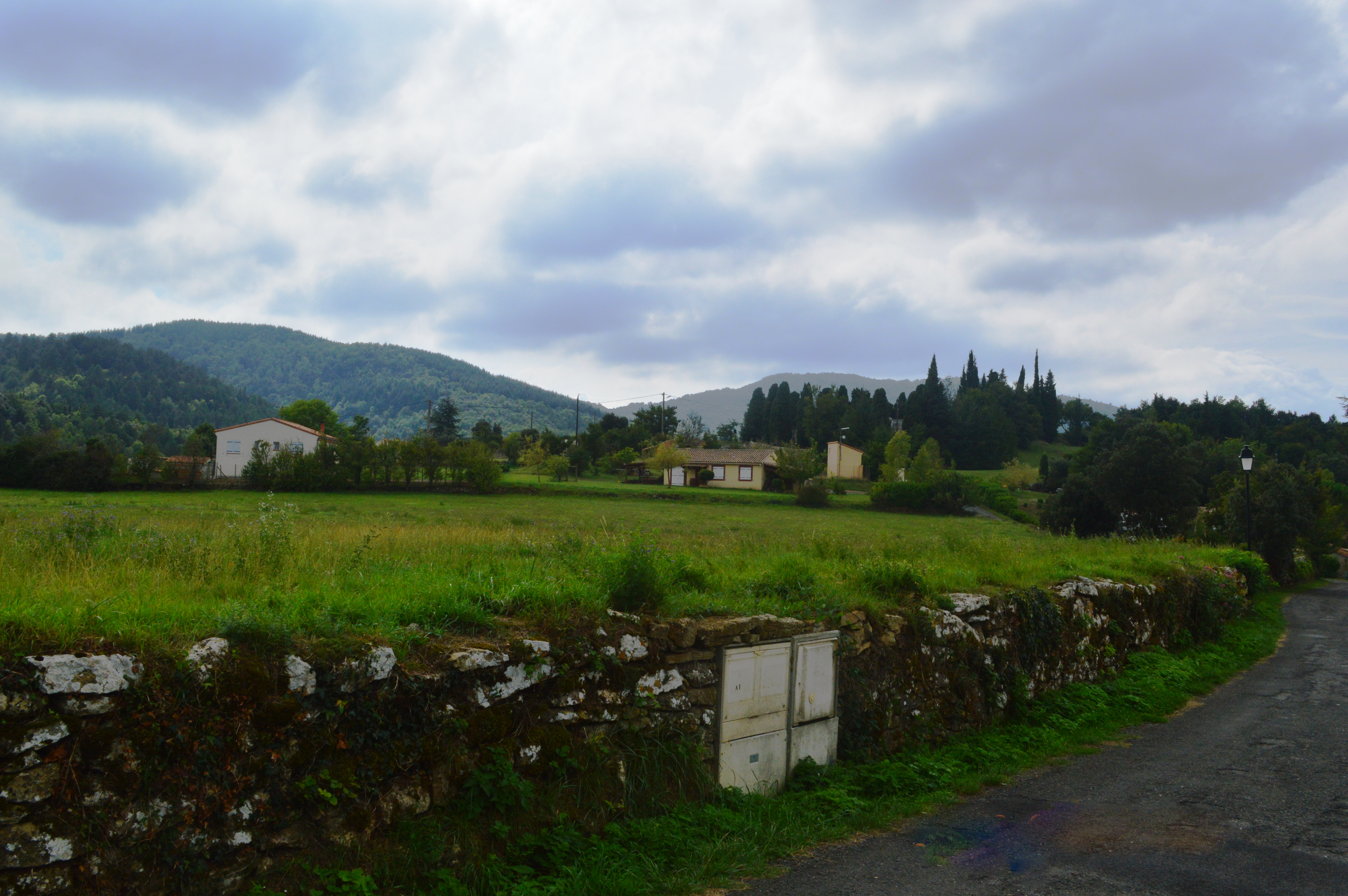
- A general view of Albières

- Coat of arms
- Location of Albières
- Location within France Location within Occitanie
- Coordinates: 42°56′52″N 2°28′43″E
- Country: France
- Region: Occitania
- Department: Aude
- Arrondissement: Narbonne
- Canton: Les Corbières
- Intercommunality: Région Lézignanaise, Corbières et Minervois

Government
  - Mayor (2020–2026): Yvon Lacombe
- Area^{1}: 17.25 km^{2} (6.66 sq mi)
- Elevation: 450 m (1,480 ft)
- Highest elevation: 823 m (2,700 ft)
- Lowest elevation: 371 m (1,217 ft)
- Population (2023): 117
  - Density: 6.78/km^{2} (17.6/sq mi)
- Time zone: UTC+01:00 (CET)
  - Summer (DST): UTC+02:00 (CEST)
- INSEE/Postal code: 11007 /11330
- ^{1} French Land Register data, which excludes lakes, ponds, glaciers > 1 km^{2} (0.386 sq mi or 247 acres) and river estuaries.

Albières (French pronunciation: [albjɛʁ]; Occitan: Albièras) is a commune in the Aude department in the Occitanie region of southern France.

== Geography ==
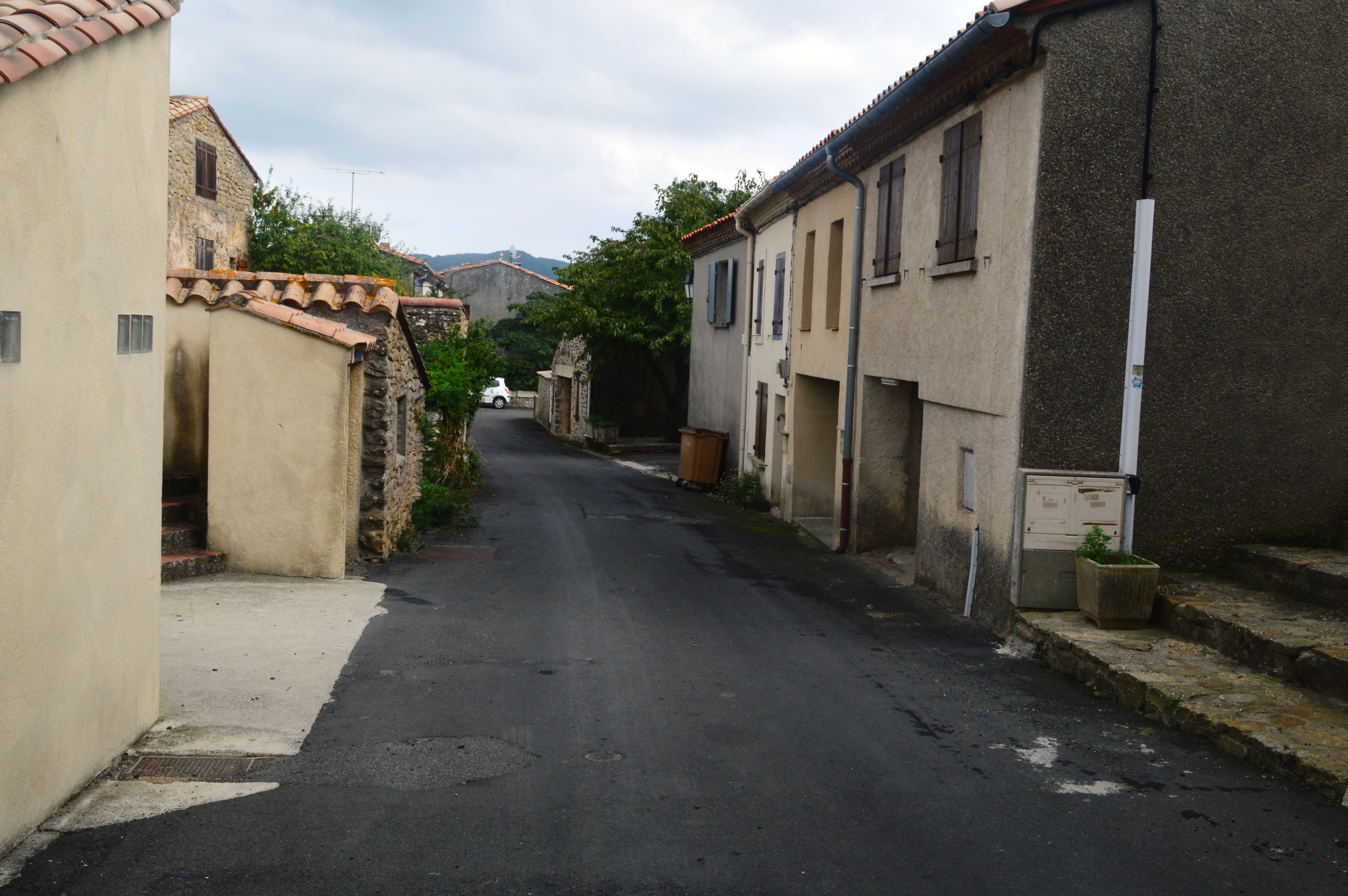
An Albières street

Albières is a remote commune high in the mountains some 40 km south by south-east of Carcassonne and 40 km west by south west of Port-la-Nouvelle in a direct line. The road distance is substantially more. The D129 road running north-west from Pont d'Orbieau forms the north-eastern border of the commune but to enter the commune the D613 road branches off this road heading south-west to the village of Albières. The D613 continues west through the commune to Arques and is the only access route to the commune. There is quite an extensive network of small mountain roads in the commune. The commune is mountainous with alpine vegetation, no farming areas, and some forested areas.

There are many streams flowing through the commune with the Ruisseau d'Albières flowing through the village and north, joined by several other streams and joining L'Orbieu river which flows northwards to join the Aude near Saint-Nazaire-d'Aude.

=== Heraldry ===
Arms of Albières	Blazon: Or, fess fusilly in gules and Or.

== Administration ==
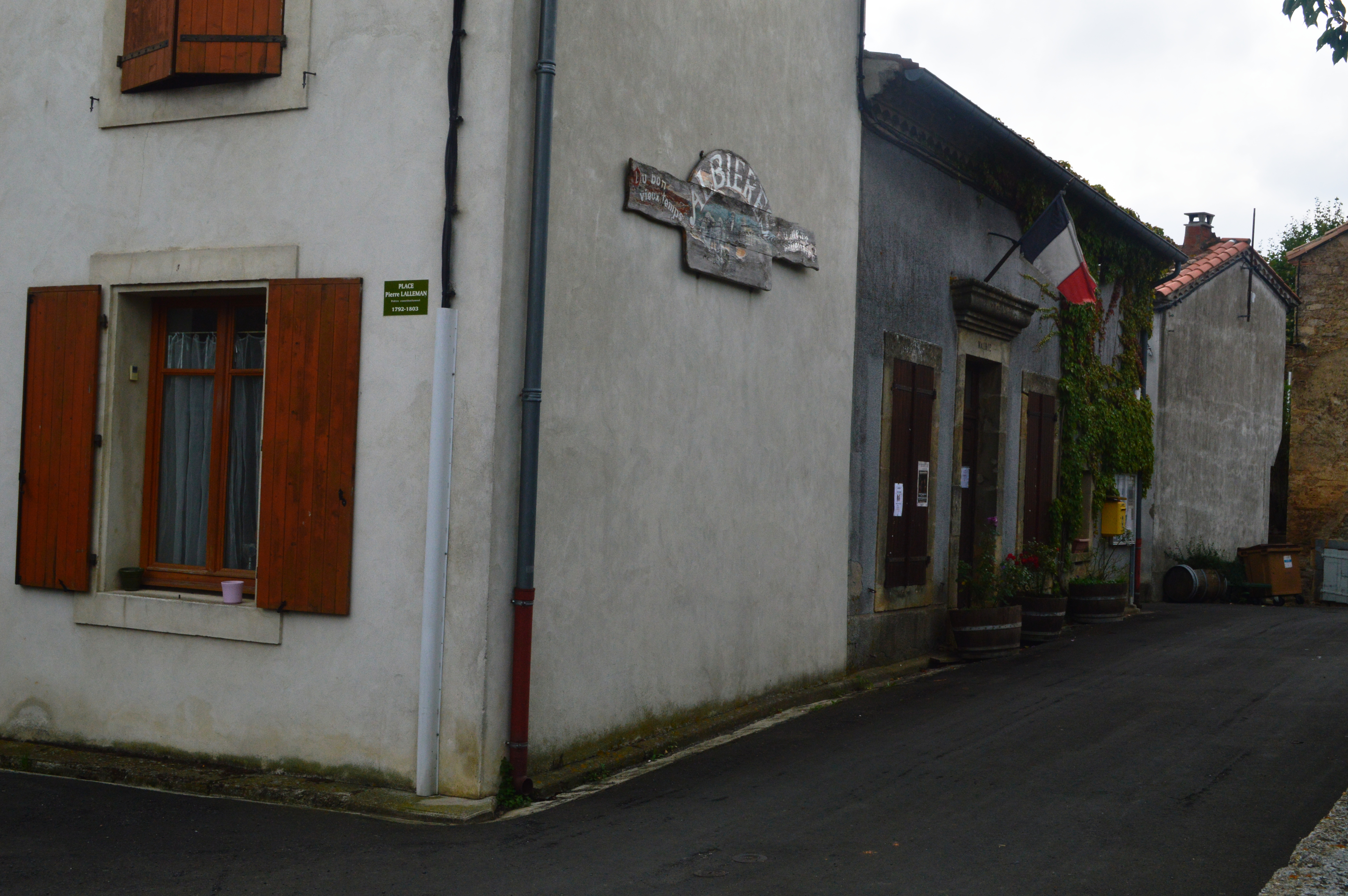
Albières Town Hall

List of Successive Mayors of Albières

Mayors from the French Revolution to 1938

From	To	Name
1791	1791	Blaise Calmont
1792	1793	Jean-Pierre Alquier
1794	1796	Jean-Pierre Villefranque
1797	1797	Barthélémy Alquier
1798	1798	Jean Villefranque
1799	1800	Amiel
1801	1802	Villefranque
1803	1804	Jean-Pierre Villefranque
1805	1805	Amiel
1806	1820	Magna
1821	1830	Féréol Malet
1831	1831	Jacques Auriol
1832	1838	Villefranque
1839	1846	Amiel
1847	1848	Pierre Villefranque
1849	1855	Amiel
1856	1856	Roques
1857	1862	Barthélémy Amiel
1863	1864	Joseph Roques
1865	1870	Jean-Baptiste Bascou
1870	1878	François Laffon
1878	1880	Célestin Villefranque
1881	1884	Etienne Azais
1885	1886	Jean-Baptiste Bascou
1887	1887	Martin Burgat
1887	1891	Auguste Malet
1892	1897	Constantin Guichou
1898	1903	Antoine Auriol
1904	1912	Léon Burgat
1912	1914	Raynaud
1914	1918	François Azais
1918	1918	Jean Raynaud
1919	1938	Ernest Rougé

Mayors from 1938

From	To	Name	Party
1938	1955	Bertin Pistre	
1955	1971	Arthème Moulins	
1971	1983	Léon Pistre	
1983	1995	Marcel Floutie	
1995	2020	Jacques Villefranque	PS
2020	Current	Yvon Lacombe	

== Population ==
The inhabitants of the commune are known as Albiérois or Albiéroises in French.

Historical population
Year	Pop.	±% p.a.
1968	76	—
1975	83	+1.27%
1982	50	−6.98%
1990	62	+2.73%
1999	73	+1.83%
2007	89	+2.51%
2012	104	+3.16%
2017	118	+2.56%
2023	117	−0.14%
Source: INSEE

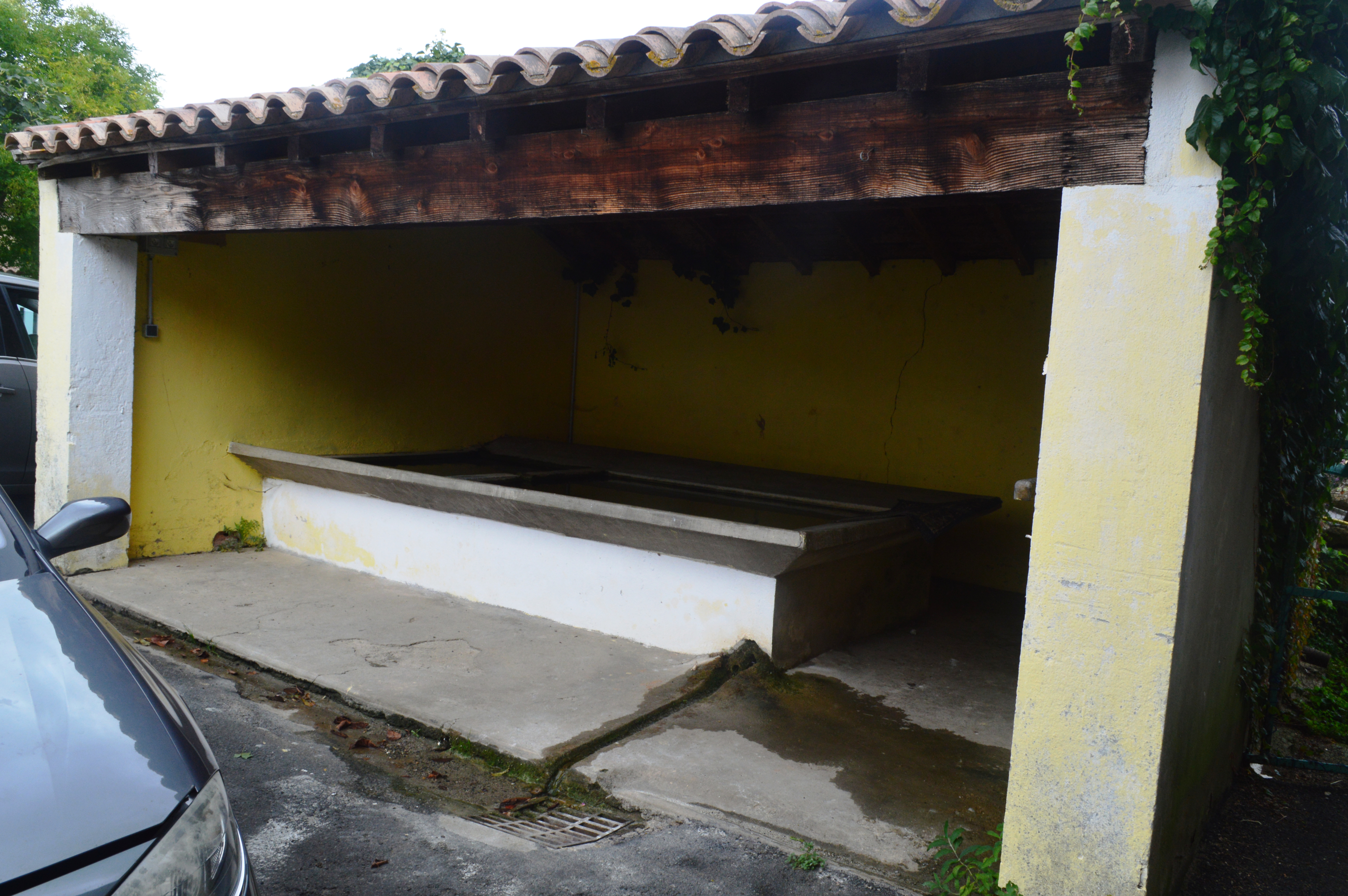
Albières Lavoir (Public Laundry)

== Sites and Monuments ==
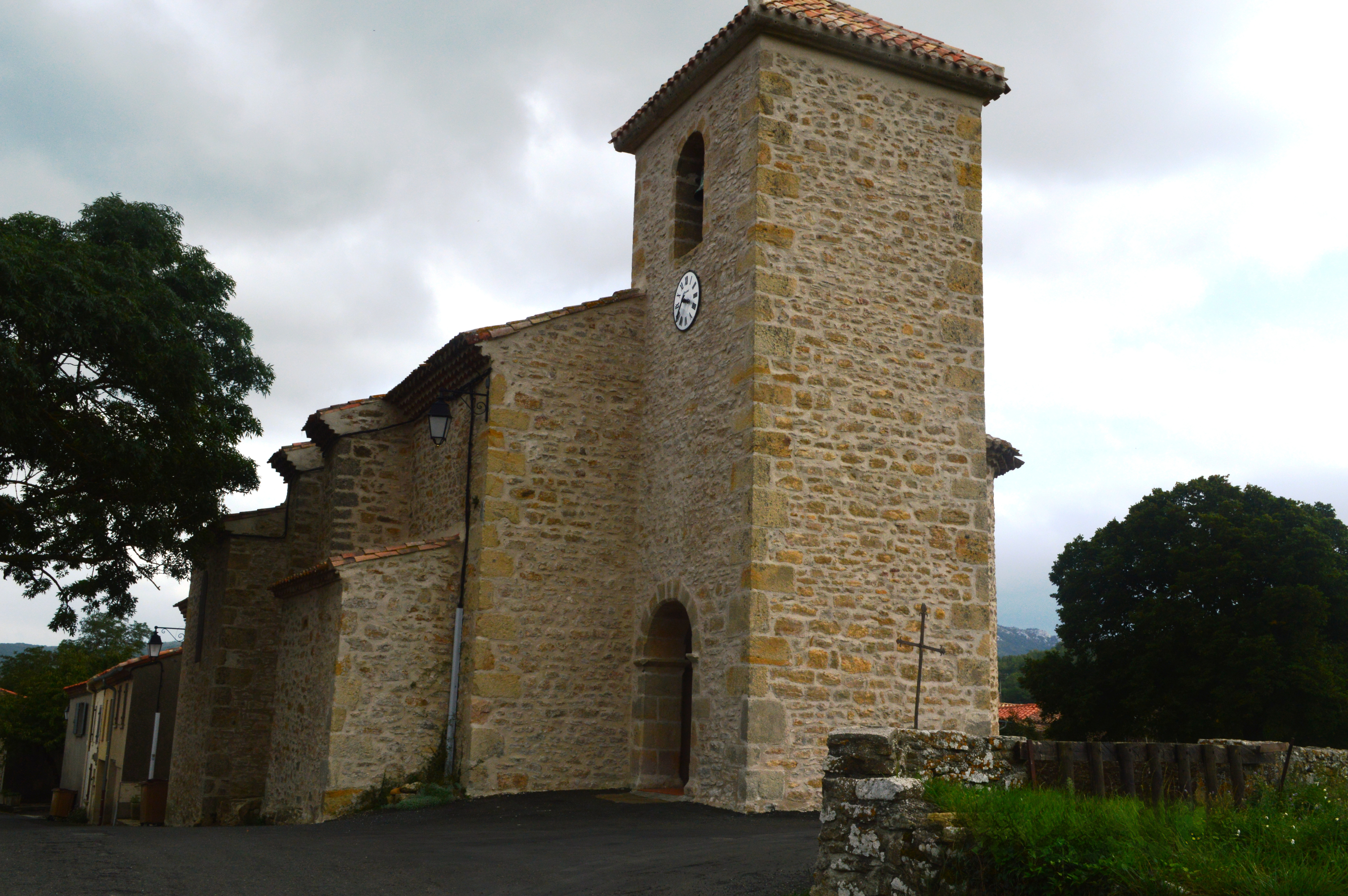
Albières Church

- Ruins of a Medieval Castle and enclosure (castrum) of the old village
- The Church of Saint Martin from the 17th century contains a Painting: the Assumption which is registered as an historical object.
- The Oratory of Notre-Dame des Douleurs contains a Group Sculpture: Virgin of Pity which is registered as an historical object.

== Notable People linked to the commune ==
- Raymond Busquet whose paternal family is from Albières and neighbouring villages

== Associations ==
- The ACCA of Albières: Boar Hunting
- The Paradis club: Club of the Third Age of Albières
- The Committee of festivals of Albières

== Events ==
- A Local Festival around 14 July (organized by the Festival Committee)
- The Festival of Albières of World Music at the end of July
- The Bal-musette in late August (organized by the Paradis Club)
- A Theatre during the All Saints' Day holidays

== See also ==
- Communes of the Aude department

=== External links ===
- Albières on Géoportail, National Geographic Institute (IGN) website (in French)
- Albieres on the 1750 Cassini Map
