= Saint-Ferriol =

Commune in Occitanie, France

- Commune
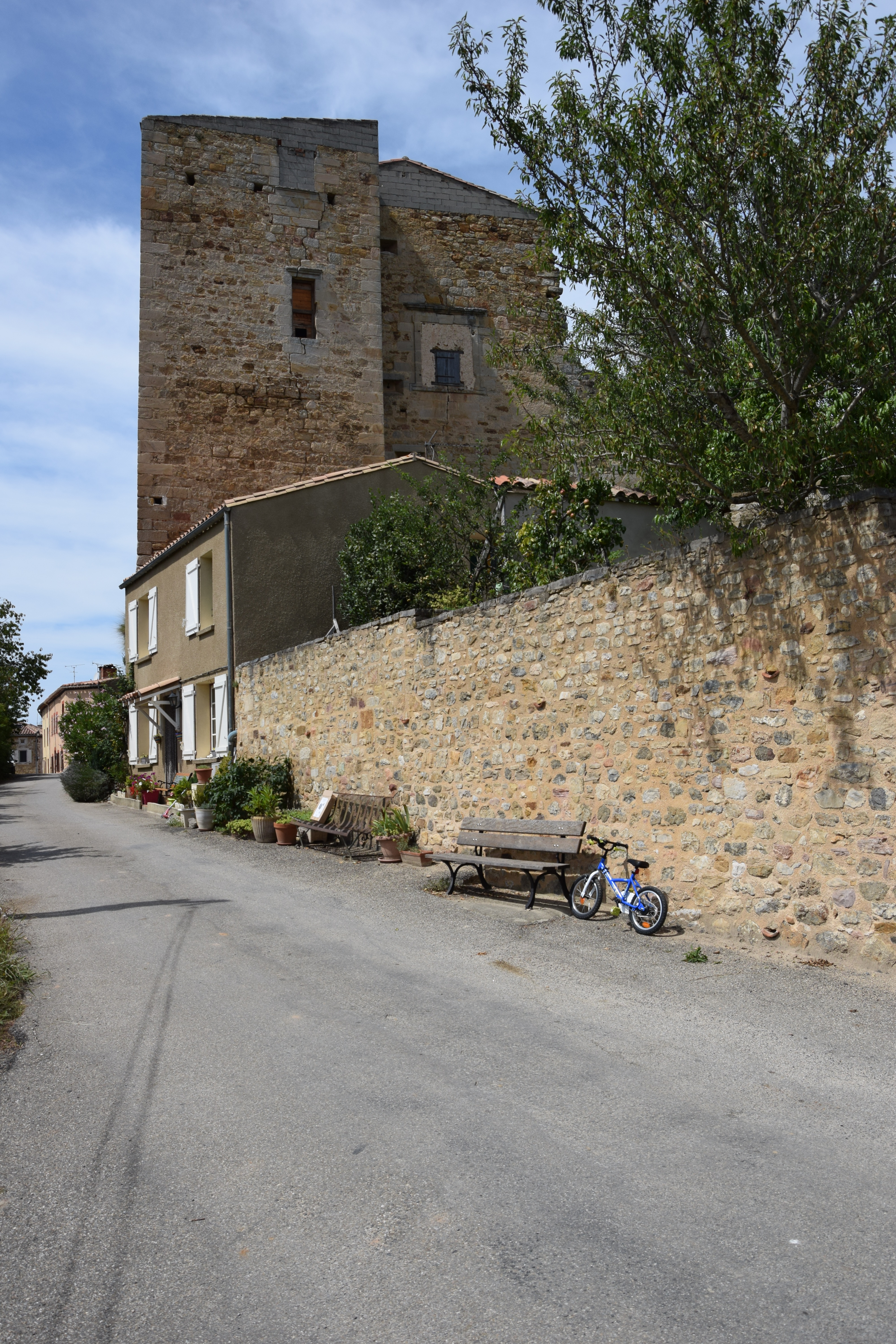
- The chateau in Saint-Ferriol

- Coat of arms
- Location of Saint-Ferriol
- Location within France Location within Occitanie
- Coordinates: 42°53′32″N 2°13′28″E
- Country: France
- Region: Occitania
- Department: Aude
- Arrondissement: Limoux
- Canton: La Haute-Vallée de l'Aude

Government
  - Mayor (2020–2026): Jean-Jacques Marty
- Area^{1}: 9.85 km^{2} (3.80 sq mi)
- Elevation: 400 m (1,300 ft)
- Highest elevation: 634 m (2,080 ft)
- Lowest elevation: 273 m (896 ft)
- Population (2023): 118
  - Density: 12.0/km^{2} (31.0/sq mi)
- Time zone: UTC+01:00 (CET)
  - Summer (DST): UTC+02:00 (CEST)
- INSEE/Postal code: 11341 /11500
- ^{1} French Land Register data, which excludes lakes, ponds, glaciers > 1 km^{2} (0.386 sq mi or 247 acres) and river estuaries.

Saint-Ferriol (French pronunciation: [sɛ̃ fɛʁjɔl]; Languedocien: Sant Ferriòl) is a commune in the Aude department in southern France.

== Population ==
Historical population
Year	Pop.	±% p.a.
1968	157	—
1975	145	−1.13%
1982	157	+1.14%
1990	154	−0.24%
1999	147	−0.52%
2007	142	−0.43%
2012	130	−1.75%
2017	116	−2.25%
2023	118	+0.29%
Source: INSEE

== Sights ==
- Château de Saint-Ferriol, 16th-century castle

== See also ==
- Communes of the Aude department
