= Simone Hannedouche =

French writer

Simone Hannedouche (née Piettre; 13 July 1888 – 1985) was a French agrégée in letters, professor, writer, translator and anthroposophist, notable for her closeness to the movement to revive Catharism. From 1949 onwards she was one of the main collaborators with Déodat Roché on the Cahiers d'Études Cathares, a review on the history of Catharism. Her husband Louis Hannedouche was also an agrégé.

== Life ==
Born in Douai, she discovered Rudolf Steiner's work at an esoteric bookstore in Nice around 1930 and later translated several of his talks into French. After her husband's death at the end of the 1940s, she joined the Goetheanum in Dornach, where she met Roché, collaborating with him from 1949 to 1971 on the "Études Cathares".

== Selected works ==
- Manichéisme et Catharisme, Éditions des Cahiers d'Études Cathares
- Le Faust de Goethe au Goetheanum
- Translation into modern French of Floire et Blancheflore, a Provençal novel on the initiation of knights of the Holy Grail
- A commentary on the Le Roman spirituel de Barlaam et de Josaphat, published by Éditions Devenir in 1983
