= Couiza =

Commune in Occitanie, France

- Commune
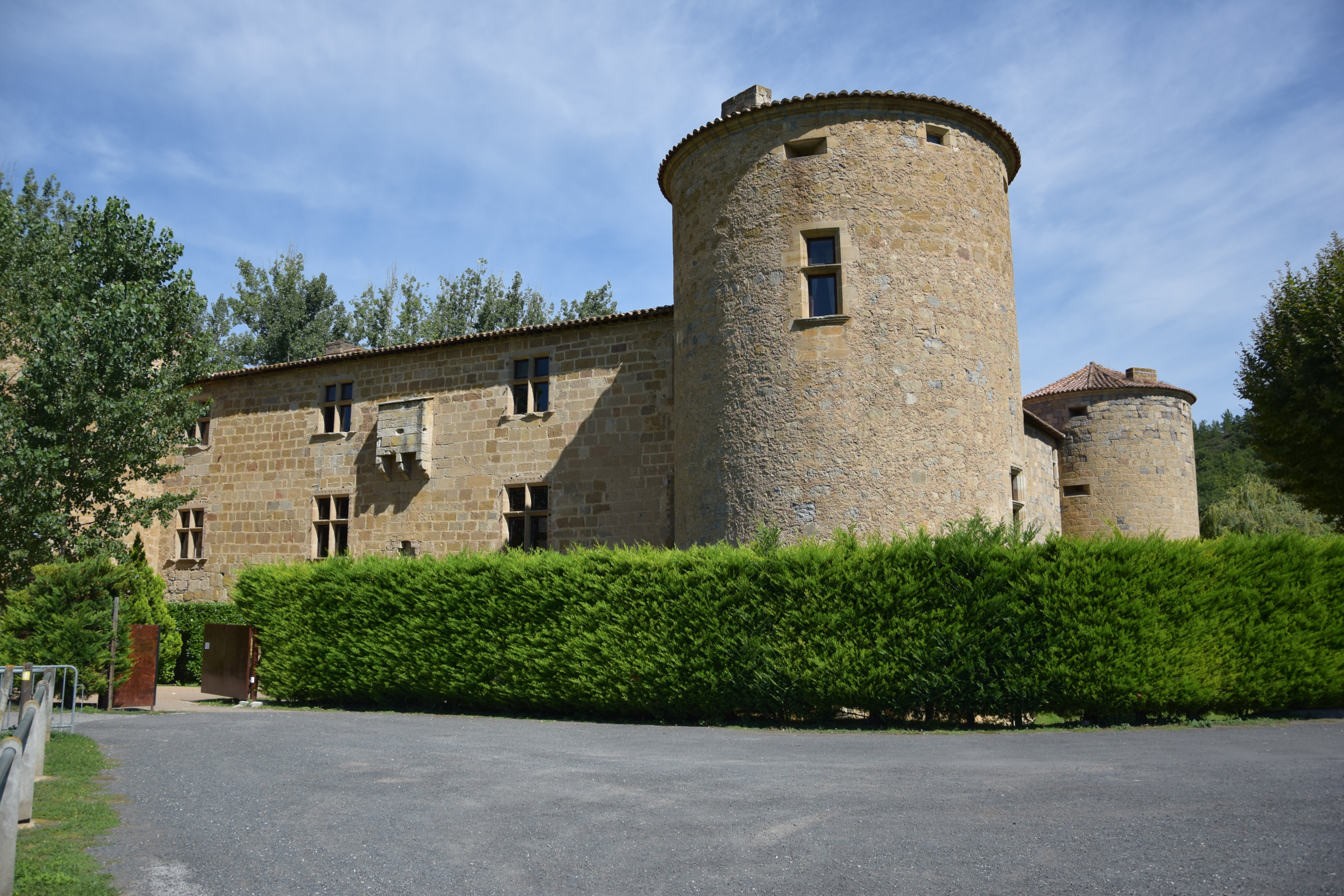
- The chateau in Couiza

- Coat of arms
- Location of Couiza
- Location within France Location within Occitanie
- Coordinates: 42°56′32″N 2°15′15″E
- Country: France
- Region: Occitania
- Department: Aude
- Arrondissement: Limoux
- Canton: La Haute-Vallée de l'Aude

Government
  - Mayor (2020–2026): Jacques Hortala
- Area^{1}: 6.77 km^{2} (2.61 sq mi)
- Highest elevation: 563 m (1,847 ft)
- Lowest elevation: 218 m (715 ft)
- Population (2023): 1,132
  - Density: 167/km^{2} (433/sq mi)
- Time zone: UTC+01:00 (CET)
  - Summer (DST): UTC+02:00 (CEST)
- INSEE/Postal code: 11103 /11190
- ^{1} French Land Register data, which excludes lakes, ponds, glaciers > 1 km^{2} (0.386 sq mi or 247 acres) and river estuaries.

Couiza (French pronunciation: [kwiza]; Occitan: Coisan) is a commune in the Aude department in southern France. Couiza is a rural commune which belongs to the urban unit of Espéraza. Its inhabitants are called Couizanais or Couizanaises in French.

Couiza is located at the foothills of the Pyrenees, on the road between Limoux, going towards Carcassonne and Quillan, going towards Perpignan. Couiza, in the upper valley of the Aude, is at the foot of the hill leading to Rennes-le-Château.

Historically and culturally, the commune is part of the Corbières massif, a limestone chaos forming the transition between the Massif Central and the Pyrenees . Exposed to an altered oceanic climate, it is drained by the Aude, the Sals, and the Antugnac stream. The town has a remarkable natural heritage: a Natura 2000 site (the “hautes Corbières”) and two natural areas of ecological, fauna and flora interest.

== Population ==
Historical population
Year	Pop.	±% p.a.
1968	1,297	—
1975	1,314	+0.19%
1982	1,259	−0.61%
1990	1,287	+0.28%
1999	1,194	−0.83%
2007	1,244	+0.51%
2012	1,155	−1.47%
2017	1,111	−0.77%
2023	1,132	+0.31%
Source: INSEE

== Sights ==
The architectural heritage of the town includes a building protected as a historic monument: the castle, listed in 1913. The Château de Couiza, a 16th-century castle, was built by the Dukes of Joyeuse and is now a hotel and restaurant (Les Ducs de Joyeuse). There is also a good tourist office, another restaurant, two patisseries and a post office. There is also a church in Couiza dedicated to St. Jean the Baptist. The area around Couiza is rich in historic and geographic interest.

== Transportation ==
The railway line from Carcassonne runs here stopping in Limoux and Espéraza on the way but the service is limited. Leaving Couiza the main road (D117) leads to Perpignan. Down to Barcelona or up to Narbonne and the TGV lines across the South of France.

== See also ==
- Communes of the Aude department
