= Château des Ducs de Joyeuse =

Castle in Couiza, Aude, France

Coordinates: 42°56′42″N 2°15′15″E

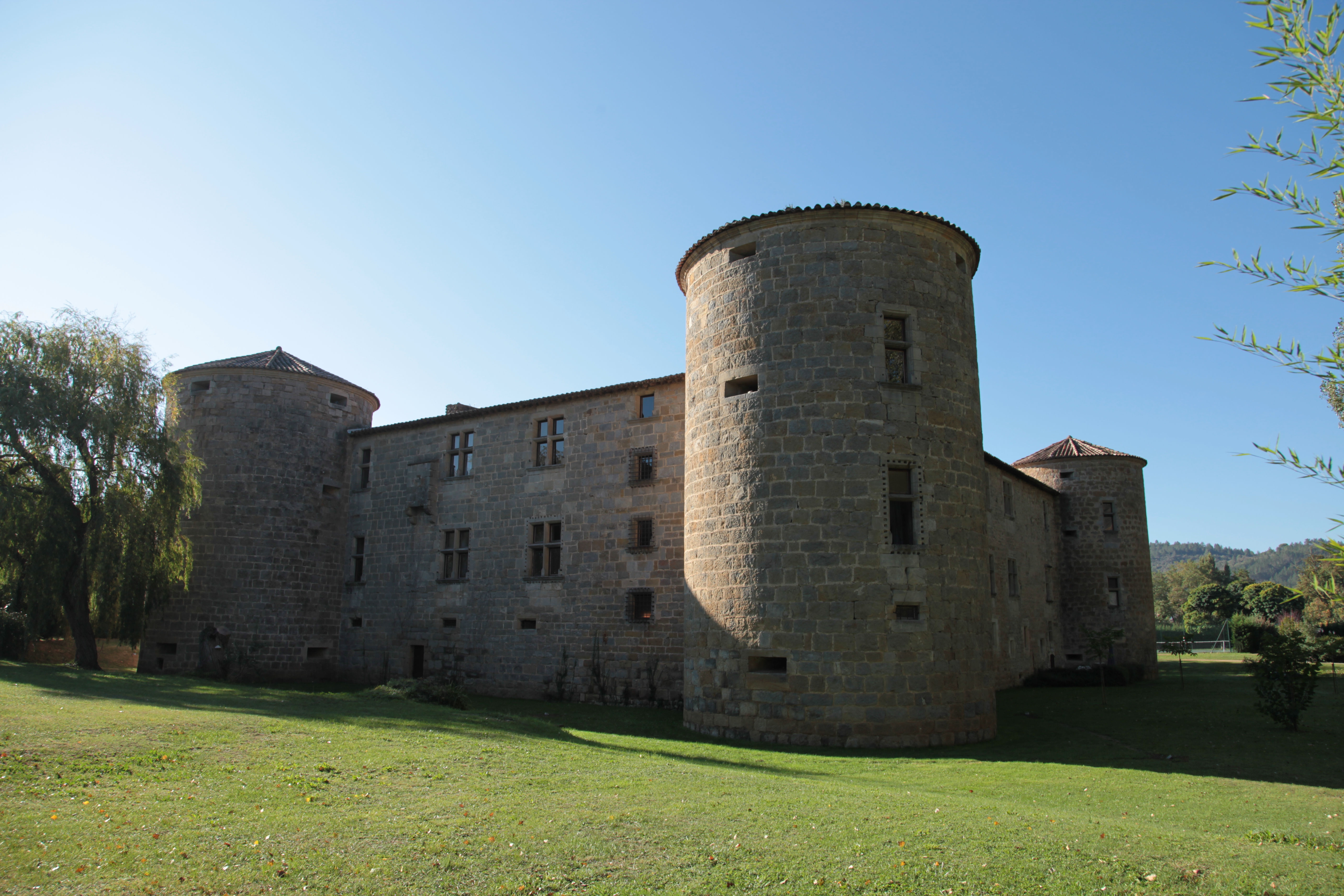
Castle of the Dukes of Joyeuses

The Château des Ducs de Joyeuse is a castle in the commune of Couiza in the Aude département of France.

Originally built for the Dukes of Joyeuse in the mid-16th century, the castle is now used as a hotel. The well-preserved building, flanked by round towers, is regarded as typical of many buildings in the Languedoc and Cévennes regions. A pitted rustic work doorway leads to the austere Renaissance courtyard. The chapel is dated to the François 1er period, the rest of the castle is in the Henri II style. Every room of the house contains a French-style ceiling.

It has been listed since 1913 as a monument historique by the French Ministry of Culture.

== See also ==
- List of castles in France
