= Fresquel Aqueduct =

Pont-canal du Fresquel
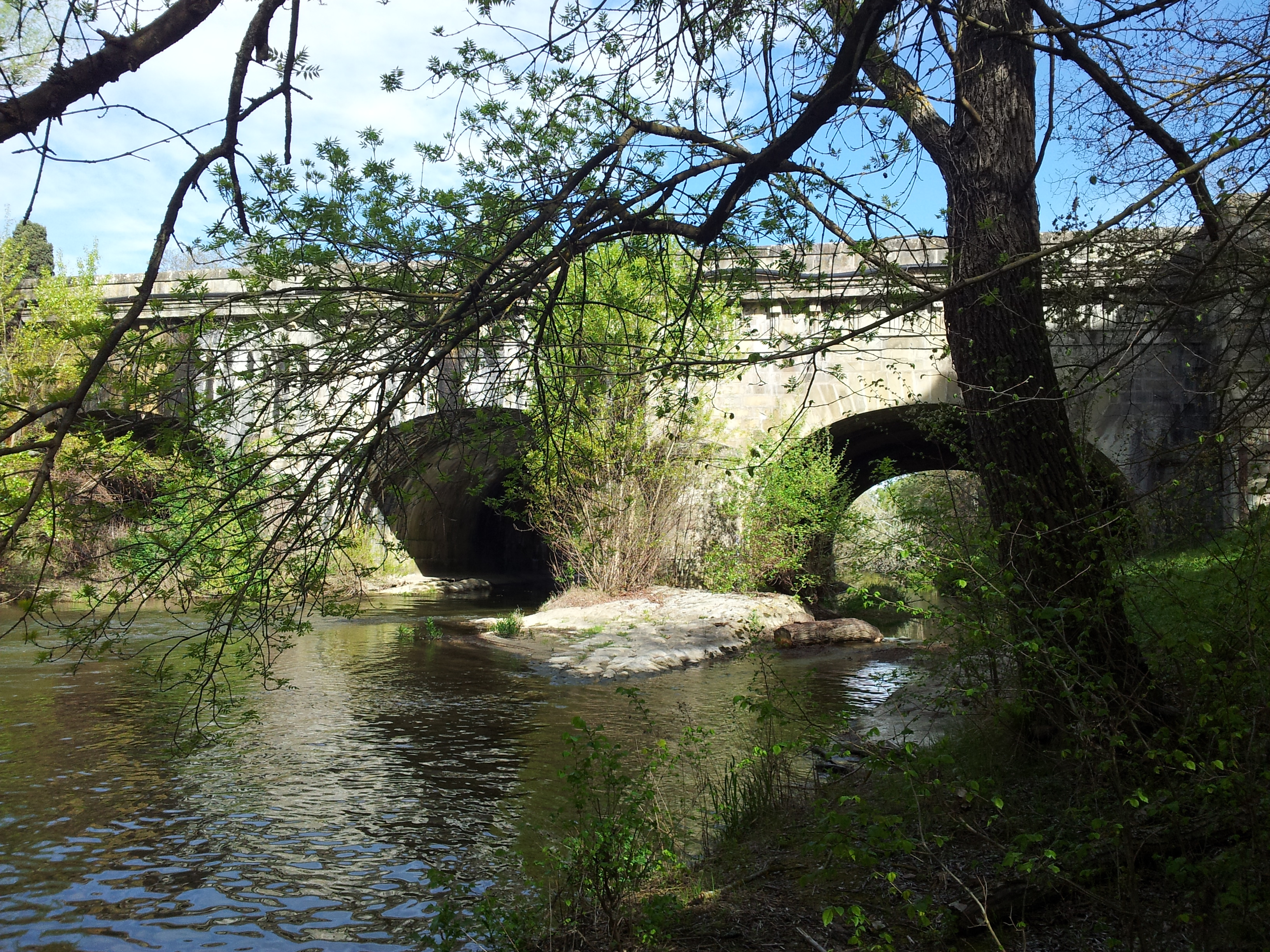
- Fresquel Aqueduct
- Coordinates: 43°14′15.32″N 2°22′23.56″E
- Carries: Canal du Midi
- Crosses: Fresquel River
- Locale: Carcassonne

Characteristics
- Trough construction: Masonry
- Total length: 43.85m
- Width: 26.33m
- No. of spans: 3x11.69m

Location
- Interactive map of Pont-canal du Fresquel

The Fresquel Aqueduct (French: Pont-canal du Fresquel) is one of several aqueducts on the Canal du Midi. Until its building, the canal crossed the River Fresquel on the level. Built in 1802–1810, the structure is near Carcassonne. It was built when the canal was rerouted to pass through Carcassonne.

== See also ==
- Locks on the Canal du Midi
