= Canal du Midi =

Canal in France

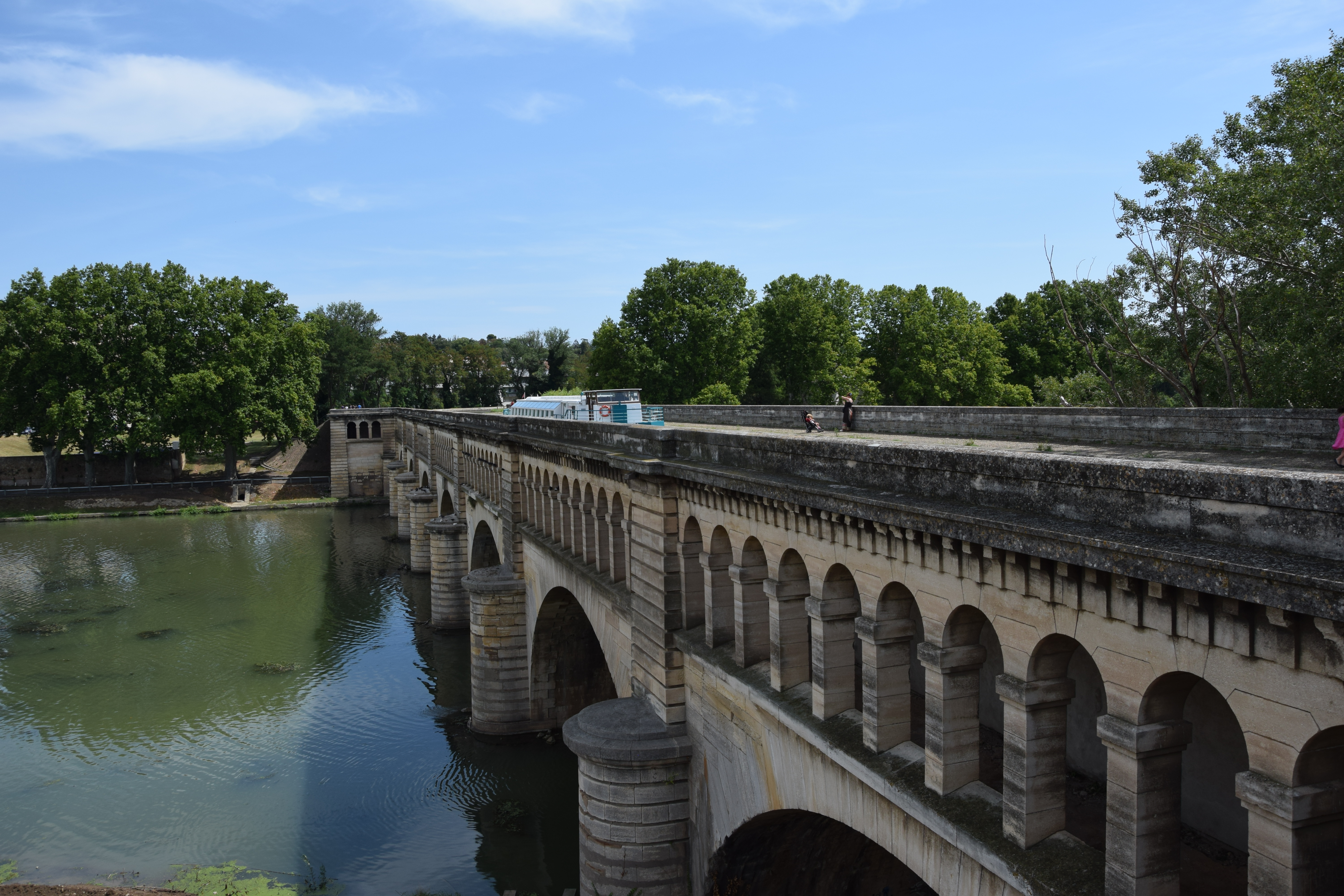
- The Orb Aqueduct, which allows the Canal du Midi to cross the river Orb in Béziers
- Interactive map of Canal du Midi

Specifications
- Length: 240 km (150 mi)
- Maximum boat length: 30 m (98 ft)
- Maximum boat beam: 5.50 m (18.0 ft)
- Locks: 65 (originally 86)
- Maximum height AMSL: 189 m (620 ft)
- Minimum height AMSL: 0 m (0 ft)
- Navigation authority: VNF

History
- Former names: Canal royal en Languedoc
- Modern name: Canal du Midi
- Current owner: State of France
- Original owner: Pierre-Paul Riquet
- Principal engineer: Pierre-Paul Riquet
- Other engineers: Marshal Sebastien Vauban, Louis Nicolas de Clerville, François Andréossy
- Date approved: 1666
- Construction began: 1667
- Date of first use: 20 May 1681; 345 years ago
- Date completed: 15 May 1681

Geography
- Start point: Toulouse
- End point: Marseillan
- Beginning coordinates: 43.61102°N 1.41844°E
- Ending coordinates: 43.34003°N 3.53978°E Les Onglous Lighthouse
- Branch of: Canal des Deux Mers
- Connects to: Garonne Lateral Canal, La Nouvelle branch, Canal de Brienne, Hérault, and Étang de Thau
- Summit: Seuil de Naurouze

UNESCO World Heritage Site
- Criteria: Cultural: i, ii, iv, vi
- Reference: 770
- Inscription: 1996 (20th Session)

The Canal du Midi (French pronunciation: [kanal dy midi]; Occitan: Canal de las Doas Mars, Canal del Miègjorn [ka'nal del mjɛdˈd͡ʒuɾ]) is a 240 km (150 mi) long canal in Southern France (French: le Midi). Originally named the Canal Royal en Languedoc (Royal Canal in Languedoc) and renamed by French revolutionaries to Canal du Midi in 1789, the canal is considered one of the greatest construction works of the 17th century.

The canal connects the Garonne to the Étang de Thau on the Mediterranean and, along with the 193 km (120 mi) long Canal de Garonne, forms the Canal des Deux Mers, joining the Atlantic to the Mediterranean.

Strictly speaking, "Canal du Midi" refers to the portion initially constructed from Toulouse to the Mediterranean – the Deux-Mers canal project aimed to link together several sections of navigable waterways to join the Mediterranean and the Atlantic: first the Canal du Midi, then the Garonne which was more or less navigable between Toulouse and Bordeaux, then the Garonne Lateral Canal built later, and finally the Gironde estuary after Bordeaux.

Jean-Baptiste Colbert authorized the start of work by royal edict in October 1666, with the aim of developing the wheat trade, under the supervision of Pierre-Paul Riquet, and construction lasted from 1666 to 1681, during the reign of Louis XIV. The Canal du Midi is one of the oldest canals of Europe still in operation (the prototype being the Briare Canal). The challenges in these works are closely related to the challenges of inland water transport today. The key challenge, raised by Pierre-Paul Riquet, was to convey water from the Montagne Noire (Black Mountains) to the Seuil de Naurouze, the highest point of the canal.

The Canal du Midi was inscribed as a UNESCO World Heritage Site in 1996, because of its outstanding engineering and artistic design, and it was designated as an International Historic Civil Engineering Landmark in 2016.

== Introduction ==
=== Location and profile of the canal ===
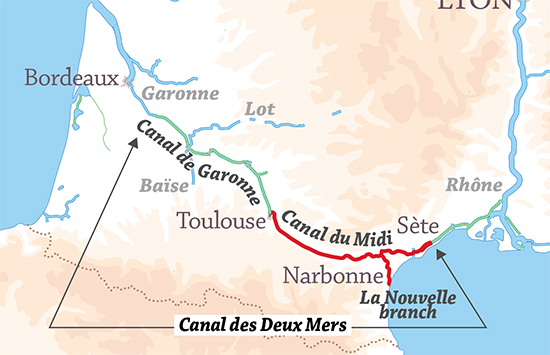
Location of the Canal du Midi and its branch to Port-la-Nouvelle, part of the Canal des Deux Mers route from the Mediterranean Sea to the Atlantic

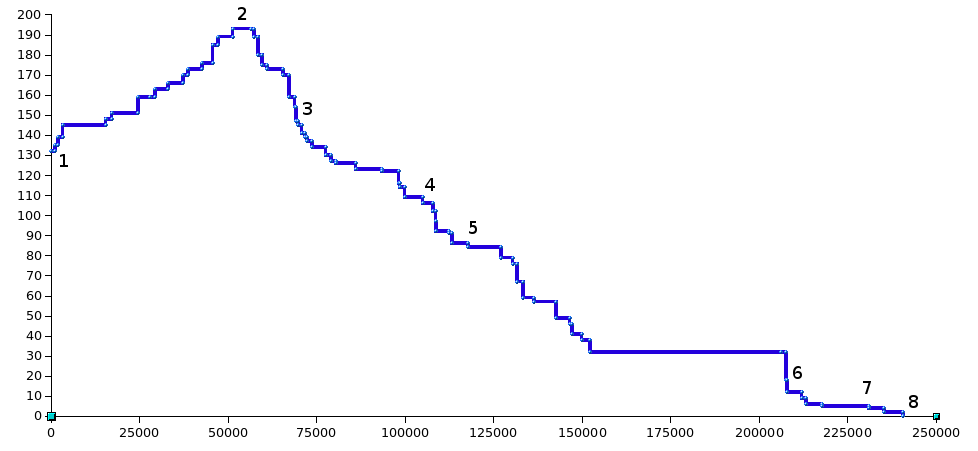
Profile of the Canal du Midi (distances in metres starting from 0 at Toulouse and height in metres above sea level)

The Canal du Midi is located in the south of France, in the departments of Hérault, Aude, and Haute-Garonne. It is 240 kilometres (150 mi) long, starting in the west at Port de l'Embouchure, Toulouse and terminating in the east at Les Onglous, Marseillan, where the canal opens into the étang de Thau (between Agde and Sète).

The Canal du Midi is a summit-level canal, climbing from Toulouse on the Atlantic side over a distance of 52 kilometres (32 mi) to the Seuil de Naurouze or summit level, where the feeder canal enters. The total rise is 57.18 metres (187.6 ft), and the summit level is at an altitude of 189.43 metres (621.5 ft). This difference in level down to the sea is covered over the remaining distance of 188 kilometres (117 mi) from Naurouze to Les Onglous on the Étang de Thau.

The design canal depth is two metres (6.6 ft) with a minimum of 1.80 m (5.9 ft). The draft allowed is 1.50 m (4.9 ft) although regular users advise that even with 1.40 m (4.6 ft) boats will occasionally touch the bottom because of silt deposits in many places. The width on the surface is 20 m (66 ft) on average with variations between 16 m (52 ft) and 20 m (66 ft). Finally, the width of the canal bed is 10 m (33 ft).

This longitudinal profile of the Canal du Midi shows it rising from Toulouse (1) to the Seuil de Naurouze (2), then dropping down to Castelnaudary (3), Carcassonne (4) and Trèbes (5). The canal continues to Béziers after passing through the Fonserannes Locks (6), then Agde (7), to finish at Sète on the étang de Thau (8).

The longest canal pound is 53.87 kilometres (33.47 mi) between Argens Lock and the Fonserannes Locks, while the shortest canal pound is 105 m (344 ft) between the two Fresquel locks.

=== Legal status ===
For historical reasons, the Canal du Midi has a unique legal status, which was codified in 1956 in the Public Code of waterways and inland navigation, then in the General code of the property of public persons. Under Article L. 2111-11 of the Code, public domain of the canal is determined by reference to the fief once granted to Pierre-Paul Riquet and limits were set by an official report in 1772. The staff quarters and warehouses, as well as the Lampy reservoir, were also added. Articles L. 2124-20 to L. 2124-25 set rules for maintenance of the canal, which is generally the responsibility of the public entity that owns it, with the participation of communes and, in some cases, waterside residents.

Under the Act of 27 November 1897, the State of France owns the Canal du Midi and its management is delegated to the public body Voies Navigables de France, attached to the Ministry of Transport.

== History ==
=== Abandoned projects ===
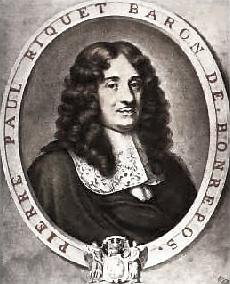
Portrait of Pierre-Paul Riquet, the designer of the Canal du Midi

The building of a canal was an old idea. Numerous and sometimes utopian projects were devised to build a canal between the Atlantic Ocean and the Mediterranean Sea. Leaders such as Augustus, Nero, Charlemagne, François I, Charles IX and Henry IV had dreamed of it, as it is a true political and economic issue. King François I brought Leonardo da Vinci to France in 1516 and commissioned a survey of a route from the Garonne at Toulouse to the Aude at Carcassonne.

The construction of such a structure would save vessels (of trade but also the king's galleys) and goods from sailing around the Iberian Peninsula which could take a month to complete. At that time shipping was fraught with dangers such as piracy and the Barbary pirates.

The most realistic projects were presented to the King in the 16th century. A first draft was presented by Nicolas Bachelier in 1539 to the Estates of Languedoc then a second in 1598 by Pierre Reneau and finally a third project was proposed by Bernard Aribat de Béziers in 1617. These projects were abandoned because they did not give enough thought to the water supply for the canal and provided a system of diversion of water from Pyrénées rivers too complex or impossible to implement. In 1650 another engineer also proposed to divert water from the Ariège to Cintegabelle to bring a non-navigable canal to Pech-David near Toulouse. Again, the question arose of how to carry water to the Seuil de Naurouze at a greater height than that of Toulouse.

The projects were not launched for fear of losing too much money and conviction of the human impossibility to dig such a canal. The major problem was how to supply the summit sections with enough water.

Nevertheless, Pierre-Paul Riquet, a wealthy collector of salt tax in Languedoc proposed a more convincing project than his predecessors. When Louis XIV received his proposal through the Archbishop of Toulouse (Charles-François Anglure of Bourlemont) in 1662 he saw the opportunity to deprive Spain of part of its resources, and the opportunity to mark his reign with an imperishable work.

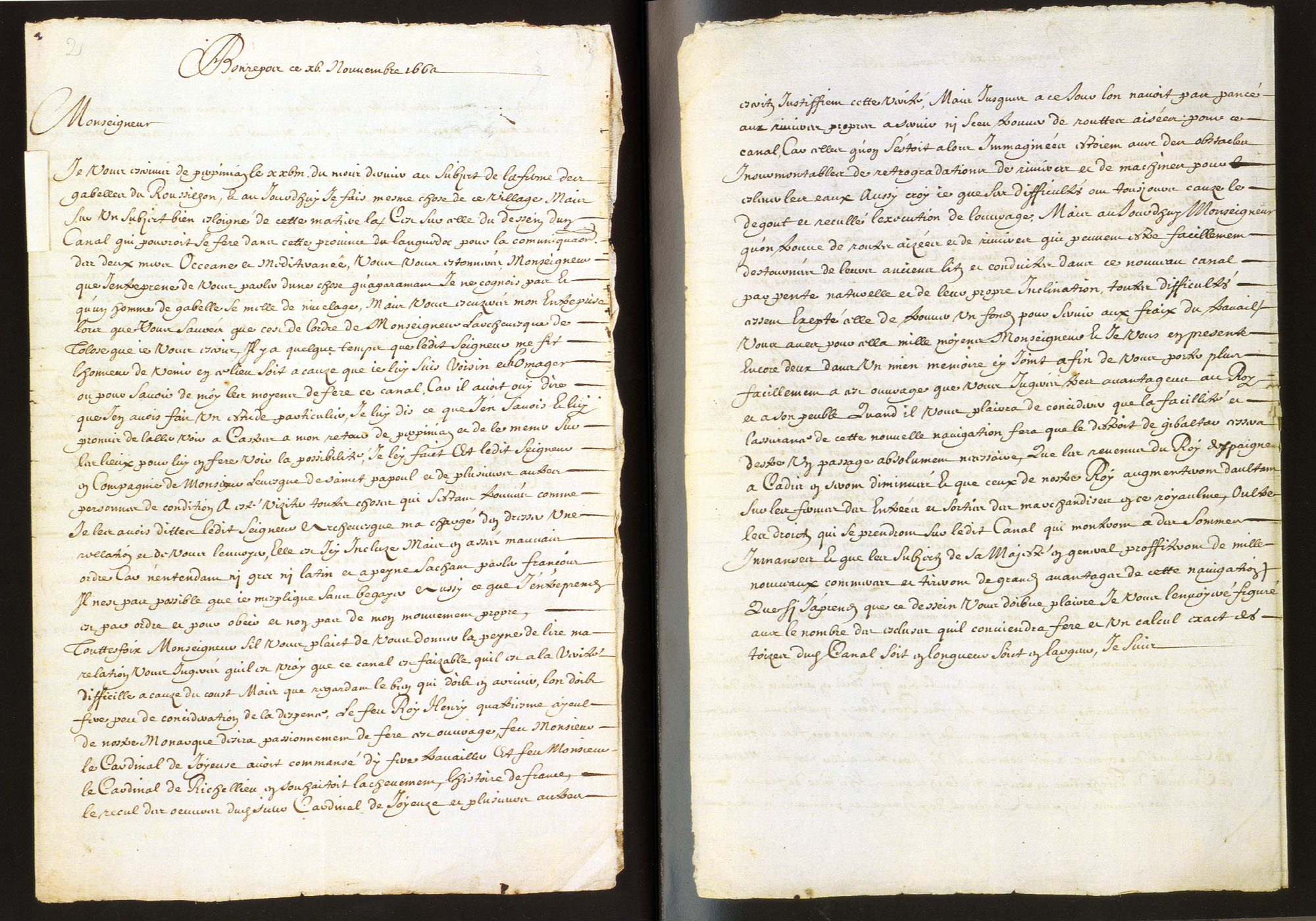
Photograph of the Letter, Archives of the canal, Toulouse

English translation:

Monseigneur,

I wrote you from Perpignan, on the 28th of last month, on the subject of the collection of salt tax in Roussillon and today I am doing the same in this village, but on a subject far removed from that matter there. It is on the design of a canal that could be done in the province of Languedoc for communication between the two seas Océane and Mediterranean, you will be surprised, my lord, that I undertake to tell you about something apparently I do not know and that a collector of salt tax mixes with levelling ...

But, you will forgive my enterprise when you know that it is on the order of Monseigneur the Archbishop of Toulouse that I write to you. It was some time ago that the lord did me the honour to come to this place because of the fact that I am his neighbour and servant where to find me the means to make this canal, because he had heard that I had done a particular study of it, I told him that I knew him and promised to visit him at Castres on my return from Perpignan, and to guide him around the area to make him see the possibility. I did this and said in the company of the Lord Bishop of Saint-Papoul and several other persons of substance who visited, all of which was found as I had said, the Lord Archbishop was responsible for drawing up a letter and sending it to you, it is included here but in poor order, because, understanding neither Greek nor Latin, and barely able to speak French, it is not possible for me to explain without stuttering, so what I set out to do is by order and for obedience not of my own volition.

However, my Lord, please take the trouble to read my mail, so that you may truly judge that this canal is feasible, it is truly difficult because of the cost but it can be seen that the good that will come outweighs the consideration of expense. The late King Henry IV, grandfather of our monarch, wished passionately to do this work, the late Cardinal de Joyeuse had started to do some work and Cardinal Richelieu wanted this achievement, in the history of France, the collected works of the said Cardinal de Joyeuse and several other writings warrant the truth; but until today, nobody had thought about how the river can be used to find an easy route for the canal, because it had then been imagined that the use of rivers and machines for raising water were insurmountable obstacles. Also, I believe that these difficulties have always caused distaste which has postponed the execution of the work, but today, my lord, there are easy routes and there are rivers that can be easily diverted from their ancient beds and conducted in this new canal by natural and proper inclination, all difficulties cease, except that of finding the funds to be used for the cost of the work.

You have for that a thousand means, my Lord, and I present to you again two of my memoires attached to help you to consider more that the ease and assurance of this new navigation will make the Straits of Gibraltar cease to be an absolutely necessary passage, that the income of the king of Spain in Cadiz will be reduced and those of our King will rise especially on farms inputs and outputs of goods in this kingdom, in addition the rights received from the said canal will rise to immense sums, and that His Majesty's subjects in general will benefit from a thousand new businesses and will greatly benefit from this navigation, that if I learn that this plan should please you, I will send to you with the number of locks that need to be done and an exact calculation of toises of the said canal, both in length and width.

=== Study of the project ===
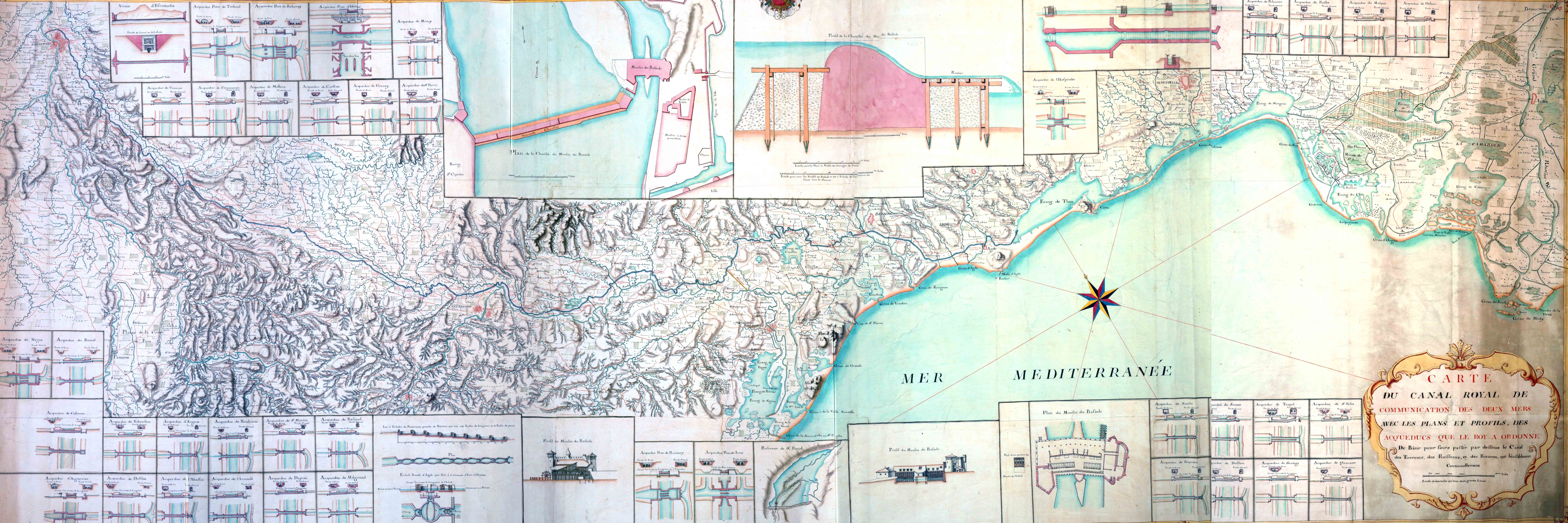
Plan of the Project

Compared to canals, managing rivers is difficult but only one canal is required between the Atlantic Ocean and the Mediterranean Sea. Unlike a river, it is easier to manage the flow of a canal to ensure a constant flow of traffic throughout the year.

The Canal du Midi is a summit-level canal because it must pass over a height between two valleys. The construction of this canal required passage through the Seuil de Naurouze or the Seuil de Graissens.

Thirty years passed from the start of planning to the commencement of work: a similar project was also studied by a committee of which Riquet's father was a member.

==== Highlights ====
In 1660, Riquet found the solution to the main problem: the water supply to the summit point to feed both sides of the canal. His idea was to get water flowing from the Montagne Noire. His important knowledge of the hydrography of the Montagne Noire and Sor allowed him to imagine an ingenious irrigation system. He was inspired by the French engineer Adam de Craponne who had implemented the same system for the Craponne Canal.

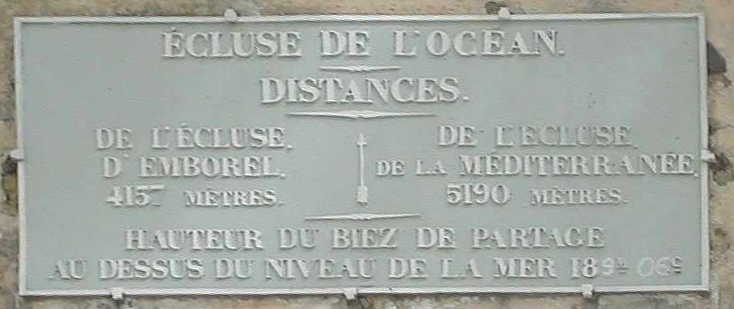
Sign indicating the Océan Lock at the Seuil de Naurouze at the highest point with 189m altitude

For this, he planned to recover the mountain waters in dams and reservoirs and then forward them to the Seuil de Naurouze through channels crossing the Seuil de Graissens. The water from the Sor passing near Revel was the main supply envisaged by Riquet. Other rivers from the Montagne Noire were also part of the system such as the Alzeau, the Laudot, the Rieutort, the Bernassonne, and the Lampy. The Montagne Noire is a region with twice the rainfall of the plain of Lauragais with 1400 millimetres per year at around 500–600 m (1,600–2,000 ft) above sea level. To store the river water he planned to create three basins: the Reservoir of Lampy-Vieux, a hexagonal harbour basin at Naurouze, and the Bassin de Saint-Ferréol with a large earth dam across the mouth of the valley of the Laudot stream.

In 1664, during the study of the project, the Estates of Languedoc asked Riquet to put into practice his idea experimentally. He then built a test channel diverting water from the Sor to the Seuil de Naurouze. It was the Rigole de la plaine which he completed in 1665 and used to prove that it is possible to bring water to the highest points of the course of the canal. This was the event that reassured the Committee of Experts that the king had set up on site to inspect the choices and plans prepared by Riquet. From that moment Louis XIV knew that the canal was technically feasible.

==== Inaccuracies by Pierre-Paul Riquet ====
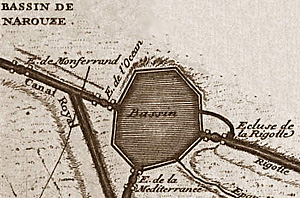
Plan of the Basin of Naurouze, which was later abandoned because of its high silt level

Riquet studied in depth the supply of water to the canal at the Seuil de Naurouze. His study appeared rigorous and included a pilot phase with the construction of the Rigole de la plaine to substantiate his claim. The project still remained unclear in many respects especially the route of the canal. This route was not final and was not precise as it would be today for a highway project or high-speed railway. Only the directions of the route were known and plotted on a map. Changes in the route could be made by the Contractor depending on the difficulties he encountered on the ground.

On the Atlantic side, he proposed several layouts: one to pass by Castres and Revel through the Seuil de Graissens and Agout. In fact, this river was already under development for navigation. Another route would pass by the Girou river and avoid Toulouse as in the preceding route. On the Mediterranean side, the route was not set. He would use the Fresquel until the Aude but the arrival on the coast was first intended to be at Narbonne then at Sète.

In 1663 Riquet conducted field studies to finally fix the path on the Atlantic side by the seuil de Naurouze along the valley of the Hers-Vif to Toulouse downstream of the Garonne. The navigable part of the river is downstream of Bazacle which was a ford in the centre of Toulouse, blocking navigation. The canal could not consider not going through the economic heart of the region so therefore the final route was via Castres and the Girou.

==== Study techniques ====
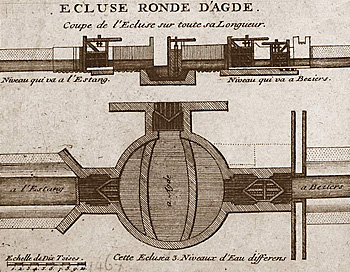
Plan of the Round Locks at Agde by Pierre-Paul Riquet

Pierre-Paul Riquet had no technical training and learnt on the job. He regularly practised experiments and field observations. His technique remained highly empirical because at that time applied science and hydraulic techniques through laws or concepts had not been mastered. Even so, Riquet had a scientific approach as he systematically took measurements of flow and made calculations of volumes. In addition, to overcome his technical shortcomings, he was surrounded by many technicians such as Hector Boutheroüe, François Andreossy surveyor and cartographer, and Pierre Campmas an expert in water flows.

He set up experiments to prove that it was possible to bring the water to the Seuil de Naurouze from the river Sor in the Montagne Noire. At his own expense, of 200,000 livres, he built a test canal, only two feet wide, and on the 9 November 1665 he opened the flow successfully. When the canal was authorized the next year, this test rigole would become the Rigole de la plaine. He also built on his property in Bonrepos a model of the canal with locks, tunnels, and épanchoirs (spillways) reproducing the slopes and feeding all with water.

=== Political and economic context ===
The economic situation of the country was quite difficult at the time. When Colbert became minister he believed that domestic and international trade was not in favour of the Kingdom of France. The Dutch could take better advantage of trade and economic activity in the country. The prices of grain dropped a lot and wine production fell in 1660. This crisis caused depreciation of land values and small farms were going bankrupt. In addition, the region of Languedoc experienced religious conflict during the Fronde. It was difficult to implement a policy in this area and in particular to introduce taxes such as the salt tax.

Colbert then saw Pierre-Paul Riquet and his project as a way to pursue a policy of economic expansion in the service of absolutism in Languedoc. In fact, Riquet proposed himself to implement the salt tax and to build the Canal du Midi. Thus, the construction of the canal would permit the creation of a direct passage between the Mediterranean Sea and the Atlantic without passing through the Strait of Gibraltar controlled by the Spaniards, the aim being to destroy the Spanish trade and establish a commercial flow through Languedoc. The Languedoc region had many resources such as wheat, wine from Minervois, woollen cloth, silk, and salt which producers were struggling to export due to lack of trade. By passing through the Canal du Midi, Colbert hoped to distribute goods in the different regions of le Midi to strengthen royal power and open up Toulouse and its region.

=== The edict of Louis XIV and the financing of the project ===
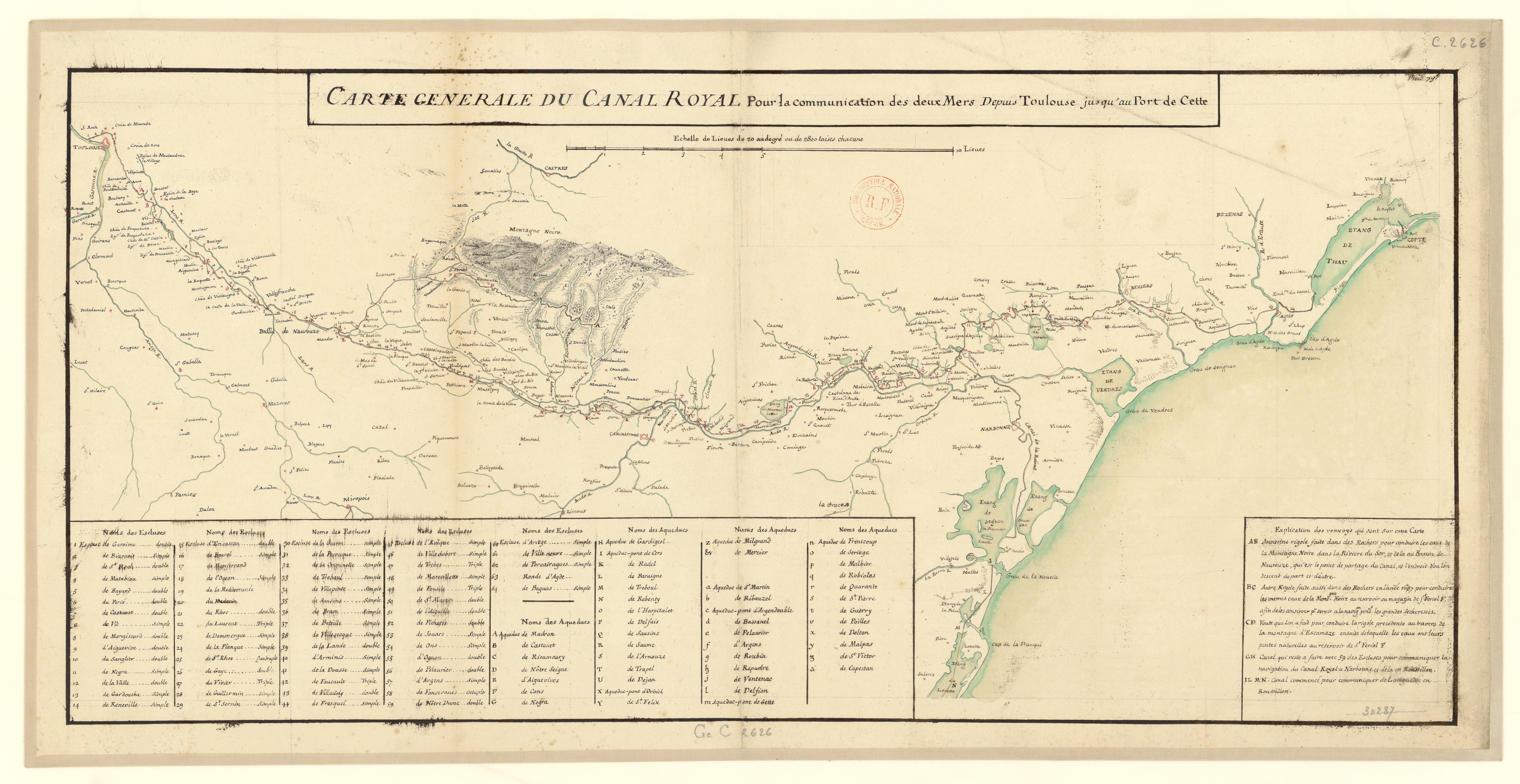
Map of the canal from Toulouse to Sète, 18th century or earlier

Despite a project that seemed precarious, Colbert authorized commencement of work by a royal edict in October 1666 after the approval of a committee of experts that looked at the route of the canal for several months. The project benefited significantly from the appointment of an engineer for fortifications and hydraulics – Louis Nicolas de Clerville – who used his influence with Colbert to start the project. The decree specified the authorization of the construction of the canal, its issuing of invitations to tender, and its awarding to the designer, Pierre-Paul Riquet, and his descendants. It also gave rights of expropriation to Riquet and describes the possibility of creating mills, warehouses and housing for the operation of the canal. The project formed a tax-exempt "fief" whose owner had the rights of fishing and hunting. Finally, it describes the operating procedures including the introduction of tolls, traffic organization, and ownership of vessels. The king decided to cede the ownership and operation of the facility in a particular order to overcome the potential drawbacks of a work so great. This system ensured the continued maintenance and operation of the canal even if the state's finances are at their lowest.

The work was launched in two phases each called an "enterprise". The first enterprise of connecting Toulouse to Trèbes was estimated at 3.6 million livres. The finances of the State, however, were not very sound and the Estates of Languedoc were not willing to fund such a project for fear that their funds would be used for unexpected expenses. So, in exchange for the ownership and operation of the canal, Pierre-Paul Riquet proposed to finance part of the works from his own funds. The rest was to be paid by the State in exchange for profits that Riquet earned from the salt tax. The second enterprise of works between Trèbes and the étang de Thau in December 1668 cost 5.832 million livres plus a million more livres for the resumption of work on the port of Sète.

Ultimately, while the initial budget was six million livres, all the work together would cost between 17 and 18 million livres of the time, 40% was advanced by the King, 40% by the province, and 20% by Riquet himself, who became the owner. His descendants continued to pay two million livres for over 50 years.

=== Construction of the canal ===
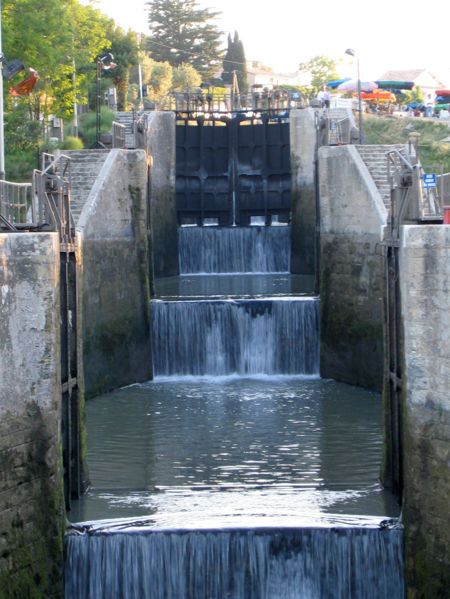
Staircase of locks from Fonserannes to Béziers

At the age of 63, Riquet started his great enterprise, sending his personal engineer, François Andreossy, and a local water expert, Pierre Roux, to the Montagne Noire to work on the water supply. This supply system successfully fed the canal with water where it crossed the continental divide, replacing water that drained toward the two seas. The system was a masterpiece of both hydraulic and structural engineering, and served as an early ratification of Riquet's vision. It was also a major part of the massive undertaking.

Work began on the first "enterprise" on 1 January 1667 with the construction of the trough of the Rigole de la plaine then continued on 15 April 1667 with the laying of the first stone of the Lac de Saint-Ferréol. Originally Riquet wanted to build a dozen reservoirs but the Commissioner General of fortifications, Louis Nicolas de Clerville, asked him to replace them with a single reservoir. This was a great novelty at the time – no reservoir-lake of this magnitude had ever been built before.

Some of Clerville's men with experience in military engineering came, to build the huge dam for the single reservoir, the Bassin de St. Ferréol, on the river Laudot. The Laudot is a tributary of the Tarn in the Montagne Noire some 20 km (12 mi) from the summit of the proposed canal at Seuil de Naurouze. This massive dam, 700 metres (2,300 ft) long, 30 metres (98 ft) above the riverbed and 120 metres (390 ft) thick at its base was the largest work of civil engineering in Europe and only the second major dam to be built in Europe, after one in Alicante in Spain. It was connected to the Canal du Midi by a contoured channel over 25 km (16 mi) long, 3.7 m (12 ft) wide with a base width of 1.5 m (4.9 ft). It was eventually equipped with 14 locks in order to bring building materials for the canal down from the mountains and to create a new port for the mountain town of Revel.

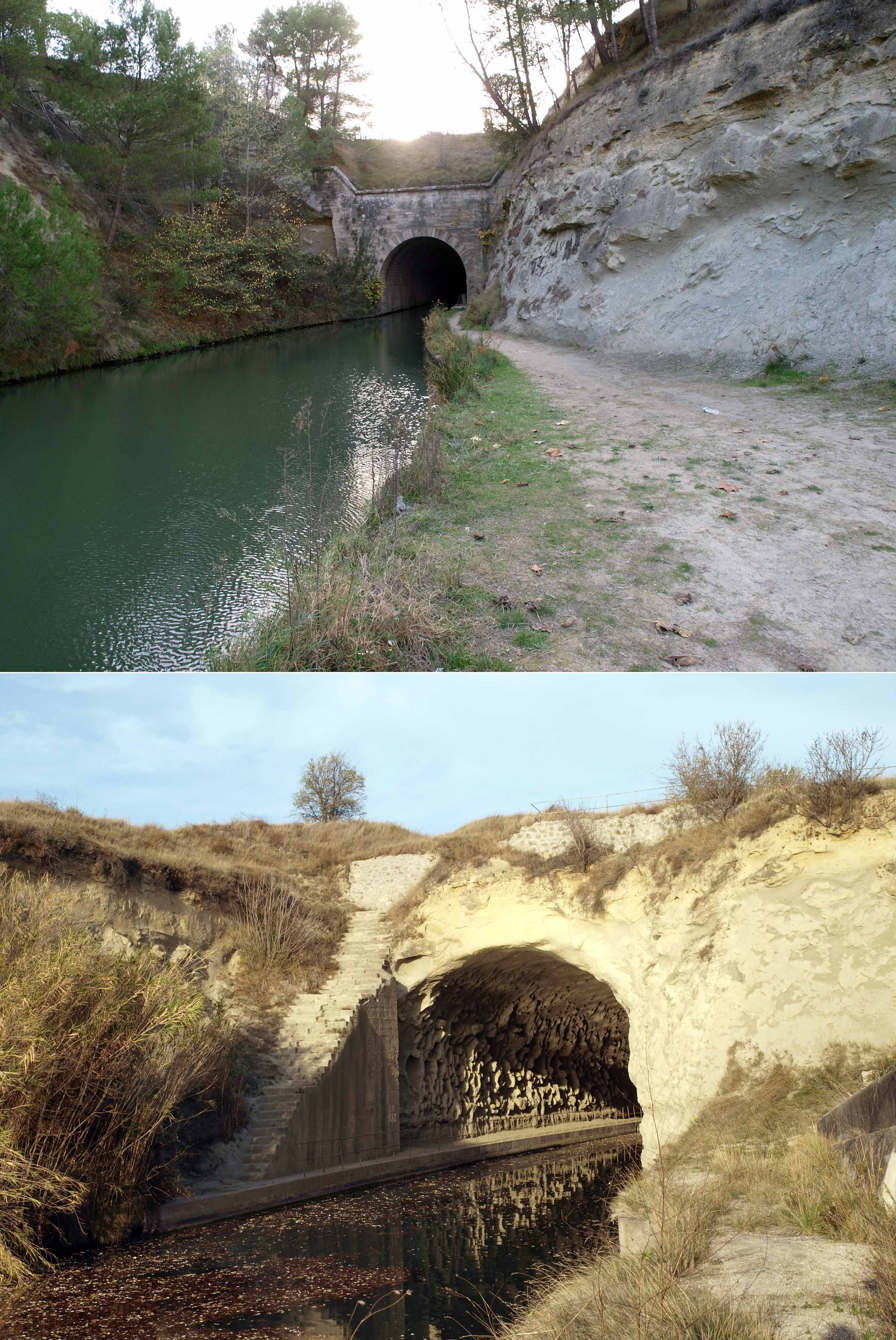
World's first canal tunnel, at Malpas

In November 1667 an official ceremony laid the foundation stone of the Garonne lock in Toulouse in the presence of representatives of the Parlement of Toulouse, the Capitouls (sheriffs), and the Archbishop of Toulouse, Charles-François d'Anglure de Bourlemont. A first filling of water was made between the seuil de Naurouze and Toulouse during the winter of 1671–1672 and the first boat traffic could begin. In 1673 the section from Naurouze to Trèbes was completed marking the end of the first "enterprise".

From 1671 the second enterprise began linking Trèbes to the Mediterranean Sea and to build the port of Sète (then called Cette, the location was chosen and the port constructed by Clerville). This part of the canal posed problems at the junction between the étang de Thau and Trèbes because the canal must cross the course of the Hérault and the Libron. To work around the problem, Riquet set up a system of valves and chambers for Libron and a round lock with three doors for the étang de Thau and the Hérault. The round lock at Agde could switch between a reach of the Canal du Midi and the Hérault. This part of the canal was also a problem at the level of the seuil of Ensérune and the descent to Beziers in the valley of the Orb. Riquet solved these problems on the one hand by digging the Malpas Tunnel and secondly by building at Fonserannes a row of eight lock chambers to the Orb. The Malpas Tunnel was the first canal passage ever built through a tunnel. The Canal du Midi passes through a 173-metre (568 ft) tunnel through a hill at the Oppidum d'Ensérune.

In 1681 work on the canal ended at Béziers. However, in October 1680, Riquet died during construction. He did not see the end of the project. It was the king's engineer, La Feuille, who took over.

His sons inherited the canal, but the family's investments were not recovered and debts not fully paid until over 100 years later. The canal was well managed and run as a paternalistic enterprise until the revolution.

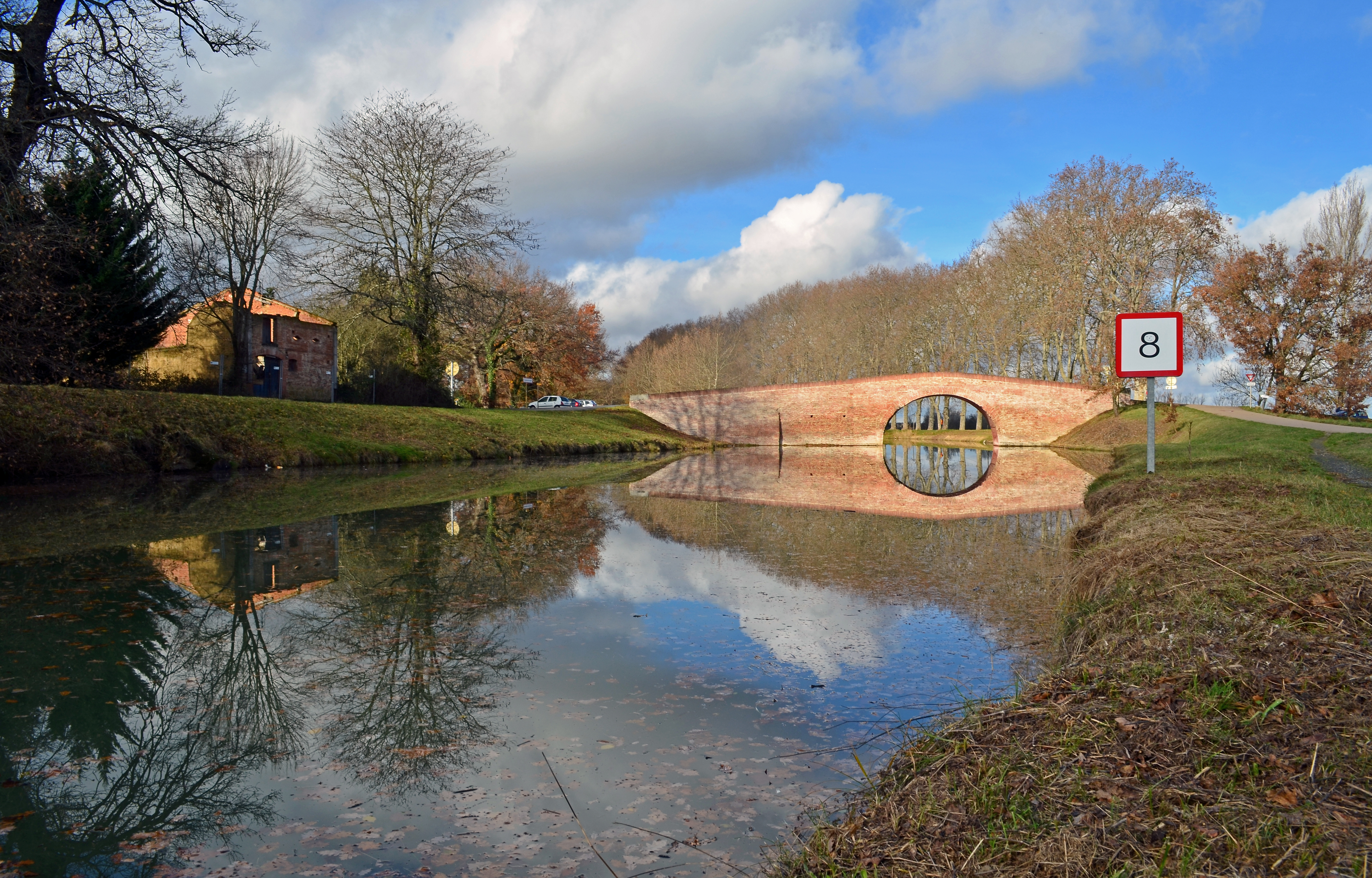
The Canal du Midi and Deyme bridge in Pompertuzat

The canal was built on a grand scale, with oval shaped locks 30.5 m (100 ft) long, 6 m (20 ft) wide at the gates and 11 m (36 ft) wide in the middle. This design was intended to resist the collapse of the walls that happened early in the project. The oval locks used the strength of the arch against the inward pressure of the surrounding soil that had destabilized the early locks with straight walls. Such arches had been used by the Romans for retaining walls in Gaul, so this technique was not new, but its application to locks was revolutionary and was imitated in early American canals.

Many of the structures were designed with neoclassical elements to further echo the king's ambitions to make France a New Rome. The Canal du Midi as a grand piece of infrastructural engineering in itself was promoted as worthy of Rome and the political dreams behind it were clarified with plaques in Latin, and walls built with Roman features.

In May 1681 the channel was thoroughly inspected by order of the king to check the work and the water-tightness of the canal. It was then officially opened to navigation on 15 May 1681. At the inauguration of the canal at Toulouse on 15 May, the King's steward and the president of the Estates of Languedoc travelled first on the canal followed by many other boats carrying particularly wheat. After the maiden voyage, the canal was drained as the work was not complete; it would not be reopened until December 1682. The canal was opened to traffic in May 1683 and stopped receiving public works in March 1685.

==== Work organization and social conditions ====
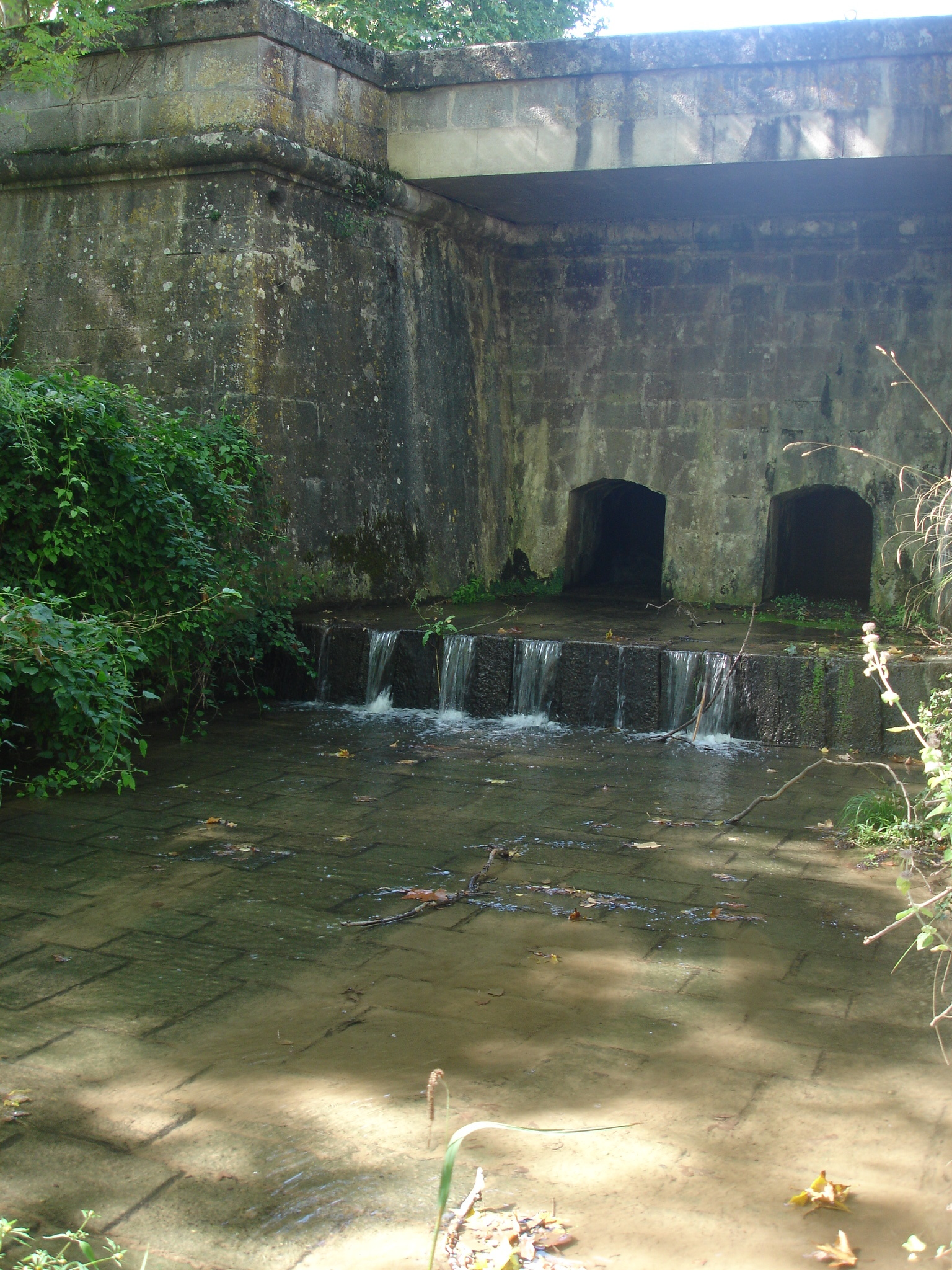
The Naurouze Spillway built by stonemasons

For fifteen years nearly 12,000 workers worked on the construction of the canal. Riquet hired men and women between 20 and 50 years old whom he organized in sections forming workshops led by a controller-general. This rationalization of work permitted the optimisation of tasks and allowed several projects to be performed at the same time. All of the work was manual and the digging of the canal was with shovels and pickaxes. The workforce was made up of farmers and local workers whose number varied from one period to another during the year. Pierre-Paul Riquet appealed to the military to compensate for this fluctuation. He also set up monthly payments of workers for their loyalty. He also offered accommodation for two deniers per day.

The women labourers were surprisingly important to the canal's engineering. Many came from former Roman bath colonies in the Pyrenees, where elements of classical hydraulics had been maintained as a living tradition. They were employed at first to move earth to the dam at Saint Ferréol, but their supervisors, who were struggling to design the channels from the dam to the canal, recognized their expertise. Engineering in this period was mainly focused on fortress construction, and hydraulics was concerned mostly with mining and problems of drainage. Building a navigational canal across the continent was well beyond the formal knowledge of the military engineers expected to supervise it, but the peasant women who were carriers of classical hydraulic methods added to the repertoire of available techniques. They not only perfected the water supply system for the canal but also threaded the waterway through the mountains near Béziers, using few locks, and built the eight-lock staircase at Fonserannes.

The financial and social conditions of employment of the workers were very favourable and unusual for the time. To retain his workforce, Riquet paid his workers well enough. More importantly, he gave benefits never before seen such as non-working rain days, Sundays and public holidays, and finally paid sick leave. The employment contract was individual and done by free recruitment. Pay was, at the beginning, 20 sols (1 livre) per day, double the agricultural wage. Discontent from farm owners, however, forced Riquet to reduce pay to 15, then 12 sols per day. In 1668 he established the monthly payment of 10 livres.

==== Trades and work measures implemented ====
Many trades were found on the work sites of the canal in addition to the seasonal workers who were most often farmers. The masons and stonecutters were responsible for the construction of structures such as bridges, locks, and spillways. The blacksmiths and levellers were responsible for the maintenance of the tools and equipment. Carters and carriers, the Farriers and owners of sawmills were also requisitioned for the works.

Workers were organized into sections controlled by captains and sergeants. Finally, Pierre-Paul Riquet was surrounded by aides as well as auditor-generals and inspector-generals of the canal.

The workers' tools were very limited: picks, hoes and shovels to dig, baskets and stretchers to transport materials. They were provided to workers who must maintain them themselves. Gunpowder was used to blast the rocks.

=== Inauguration ===
In 1681 the first inspection took place "dry". The king appointed a commission composed of Henri d'Aguessau, steward of Languedoc, Mr de la Feuille, Father Mourgues a Jesuit professor of rhetoric and mathematics at the University of Toulouse, two sons and two in-laws of Pierre-Paul Riquet, as well as Messrs. Andréossy, Gilade, and Contigny. This commission embarked for Beziers on 2 May 1681 and went up the canal back to Toulouse over six days. The filling with water had been done showing a measure of the progress of checks to Castelnaudary (the section Toulouse-Castelnaudary had water since 1672).

The inauguration itself took place just after the first inspection. The same people re-embarked at Toulouse on 15 May 1681 on a flagship boat followed by dozens of other boats. The Cardinal de Bonzi, Archbishop of Narbonne and President-born of the Estates of Languedoc joined the procession which arrived at Castelnaudary on 17 May. A great religious ceremony took place on 18 May at the Church of Saint-Roch followed by a procession to the canal to bless the work, the convoy, and the people present.

The convoy resumed its progress on 20 May with stops in the evening at Villepinte, on the 21st at Penautier, the 22nd at Puicheric, and the 23rd at Roubia. On 24 May it was the passage through the Malpas Tunnel then crossing the locks of Fonsérannes. The cardinal and the bishops went down to Beziers on the same day.

=== Supplementary works ===
In 1686, Vauban was made responsible for inspecting the channel which he quickly found was in a dilapidated state. He then ordered Antoine Niquet, the engineer of fortifications for Languedoc, to carry out new work at the Montagne Noire level to drill the Cammazes Tunnel to extend the Rigole de la montagne and strengthen the Bassin de Saint-Ferréol. In his haste, Riquet had underestimated the number of rivers that in case of a flood would silt up and swell the canal. The barrage of Saint-Ferréol was too small and its supply system was inefficient.

Vauban also built many masonry structures to isolate the many rivers that flow into the canal and spillways to regulate the water level. He built 49 culverts and aqueducts, including the Cesse aqueduct, the Orbiel aqueduct and the Pechlaurier culvert. Finally, he reinforced a lot of works and dams originally built by Riquet. This series of works, which lasted until 1694, greatly improved the supply and management of water. Antoine Niquet was responsible for monitoring the canal until 1726.

The Canal du Midi still had shortcomings because it did not pass through Carcassonne nor Narbonne and did not join the Rhône. In addition, to reach Bordeaux, it was necessary to take the Garonne which has variable flow rates and violent floods. The Canal de Jonction or 'junction canal', built in 1776, gave access to Narbonne via the Canal de la Robine de Narbonne. The same year the Canal de Brienne allowed the bypass of Bazacle - the ford on the Garonne in Toulouse which blocked the river. The connection between the étang de Thau and the Rhone was also completed in 1808. In 1810 a diversion canal allowed Carcassonne to be connected. Finally, in 1857 the Canal latéral à la Garonne was opened between Toulouse and Castets-en-Dorthe, completing the link between the Atlantic Ocean and the Mediterranean Sea that Riquet had dreamt of.

==== Management ====
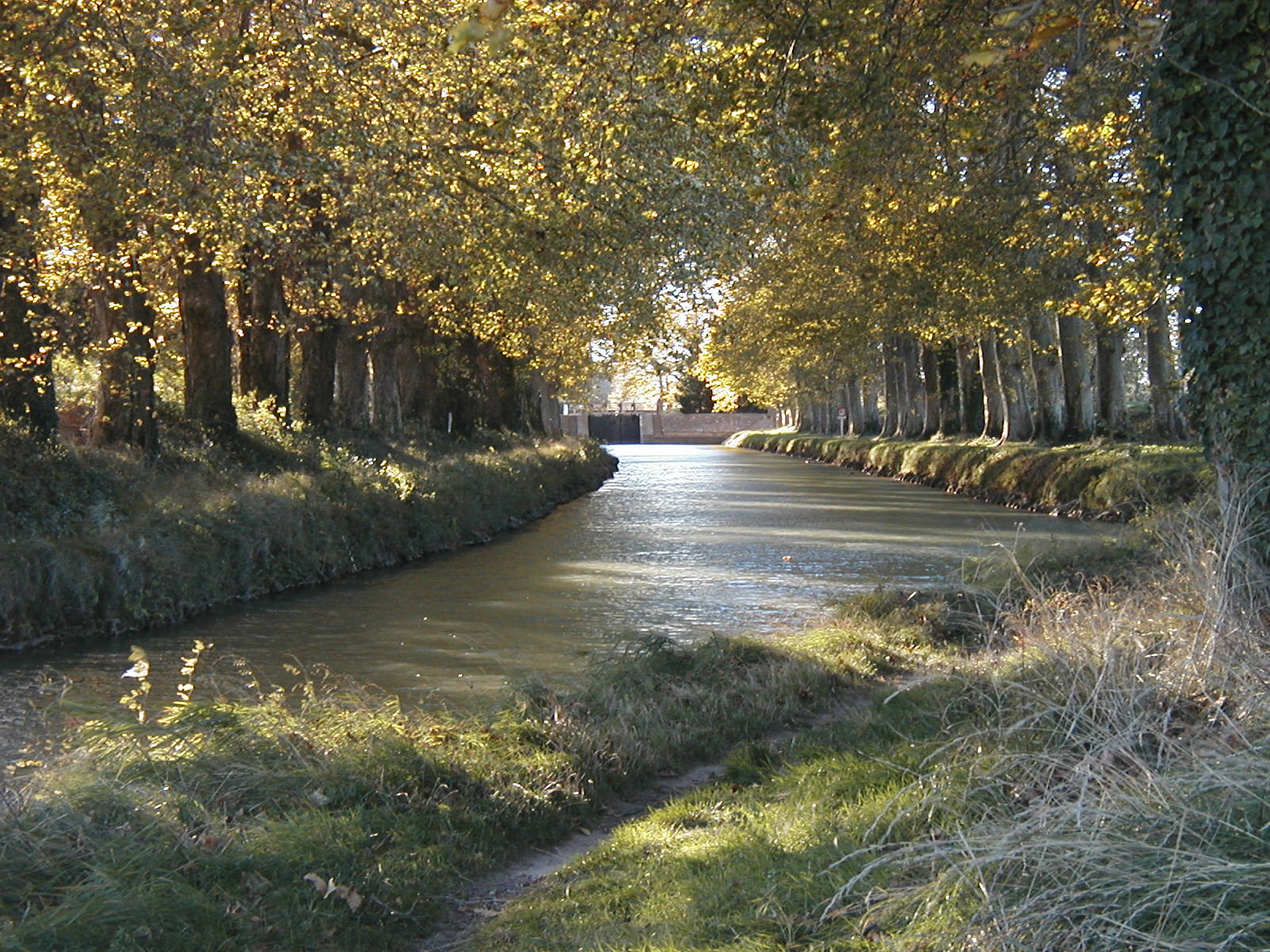
Canal du Midi: on the left the 'chemin de la flegme', in the centre the round lock at Agde, at the right the Bois de Boulogne

Channel management was ensured primarily by the descendants of Riquet. This was through the elder son Jean-Mathias who took control of the fief until 1714, then Victor-Pierre-François until 1760, then Victor-Maurice, and finally Jean-Gabriel. The Riquet family quickly put up a pyramidal organisation structure with a "Director-General of the Canal" who governs a board of directors responsible for specific geographic areas of the channel. Seven zones were defined in the west and the east: Toulouse, Naurouze, Castelnaudary, Trèbes Le Somail, Beziers, and Agde. Each Director is responsible for maintenance of his zone and is supported by a receiver and a controller. Hundreds of lock-keepers are responsible for the locks. This organization facilitates the control and hiring of employees.

In Toulouse, a group of three people form a steering committee: the director general of works, the Receiver General who sets the fees, and the Comptroller General in charge of accounting. Canal management ensures the supply of money to pay for various works and staff hired for the canal. In the 1770s a tax report showed an income of 640,000 livres, half of which went to maintenance and salaries, and half the profits and funds were exceptional works. In 1785 this benefit increased to 950,000 livres which was a very large sum for the time.

==== Maintenance ====
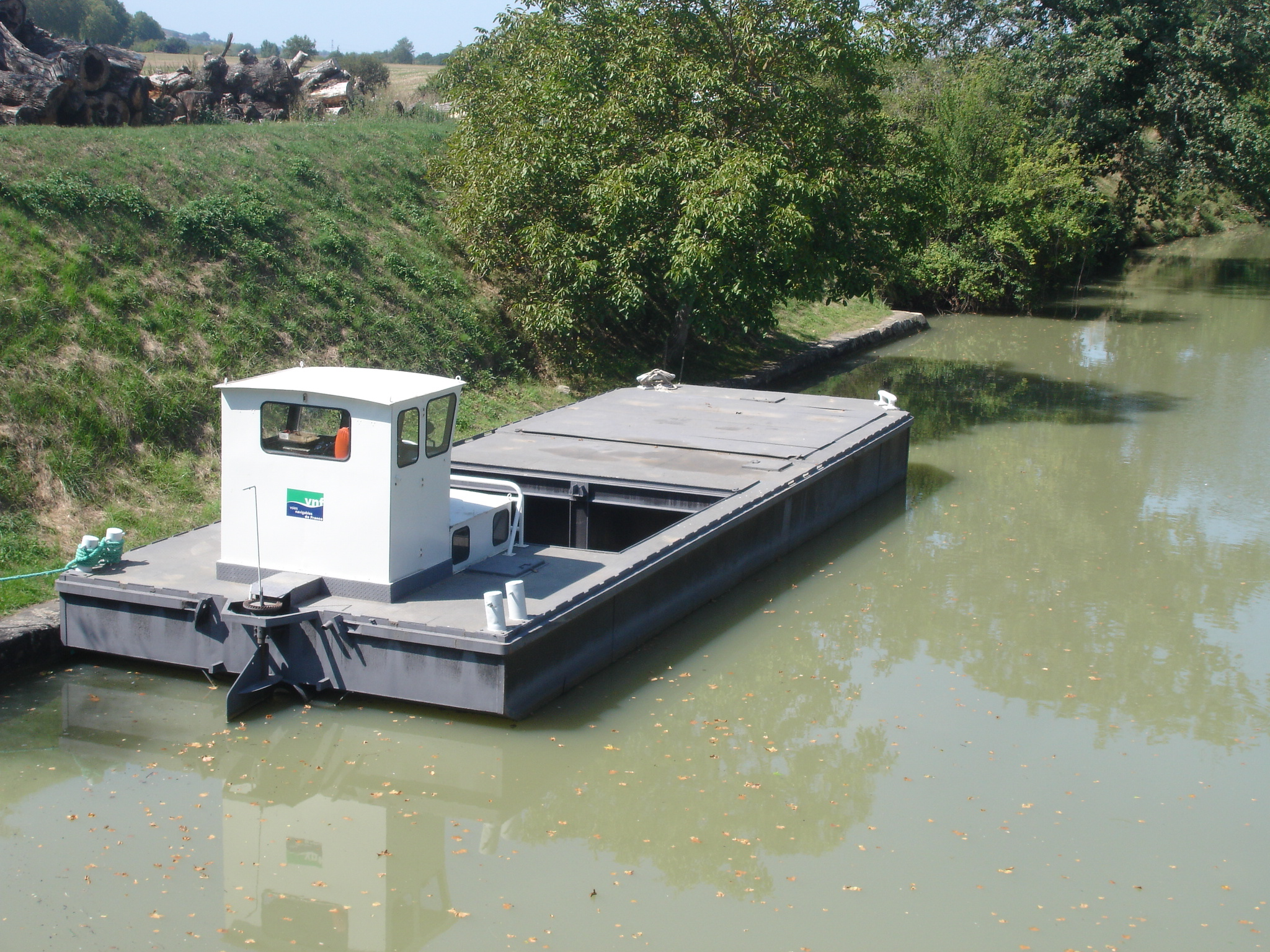
Today canal maintenance is done by barges of Waterways of France.

The maintenance of the canal was a real problem for the descendants of Riquet. Despite many precautions, the canal silts up with silt from the water supply. In addition, it fills with the branches and leaves of trees. Every winter, a period of closure allows the cleaning of the canal. It is necessary to re-dig the canal bed every year for two months. These works are expensive and two months is not always sufficient. Another problem is the invasion of the canal by weeds in the levels and spillways. There is no way to eradicate this scourge. In 1820 dredging was set up to pull up the weeds and the mud layer.

Finally, rain, frost, and drought forces managers to keep an eye all along the canal to repair leaks and cracks that might open. Today, the channel is subject to the same constraints and managers must perform the same work. They are now mechanized. Approximately 350 employees are made available to the Waterways of France manager by the Ministry of Ecology, Sustainable Development and Energy to maintain the canal.

== Operational history of the canal ==
Once used to transport goods and people, the Canal du Midi is now mainly used by boaters and other tourists.

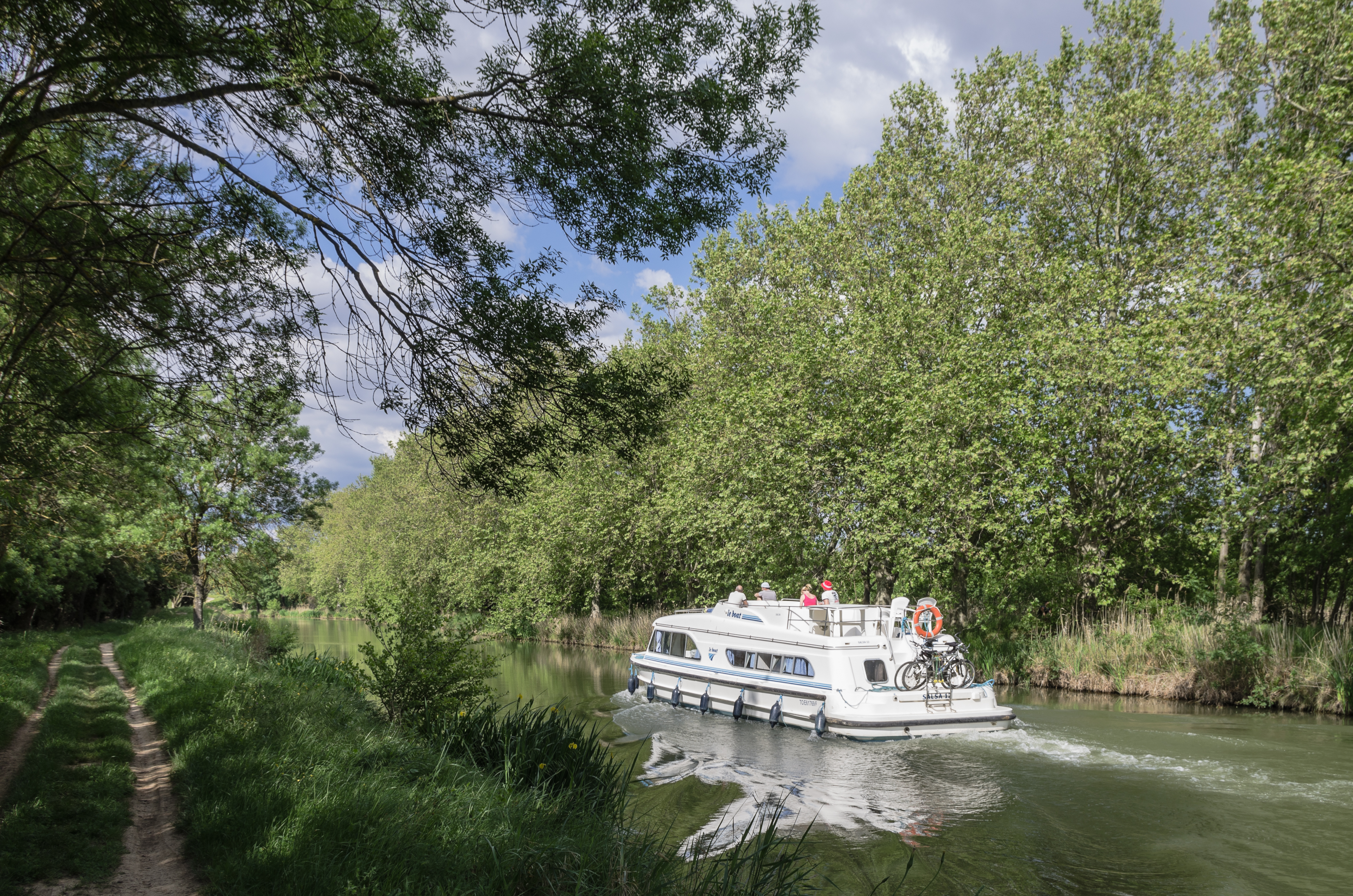
A boat on the Canal du Midi, Vias, Hérault

Initially, the canal appears to have been mainly used by small sailing barges with easily lowered masts, bow-hauled by gangs of men. By the middle of the 18th century, horse towing had largely taken over and steam tugs came in 1834 to cross the Étang. By 1838 273 vessels were regularly working the canal and passenger and packet boats for mail continued a brisk trade until the coming of the railways in 1857.

A "malle-poste" postal service was set up on boats along the canal. As for the Stagecoach for the mail, the boats were pulled by horses on towpaths. This type of transport was considered revolutionary thanks to its regularity, comfort, safety, and speed that were an improvement over the road. In addition, the canal could be travelled throughout the year. The journey takes four days from Toulouse to Sète.

This time was reduced to 32 hours in 1855 which corresponds to a speed of 11 kilometres per hour (6.8 mph) thanks to the replacement of horses every 10 kilometres (6.2 mi) pulling boats. In addition rather than cross multiple locks travellers were transferred from one vessel to another which saved time and saved water used for the opening of the locks. Finally, the journeys also took place at night to save even more time. In 1684, travel from Toulouse to Agde cost one livre and a half. The rate was set per league with the rates displayed on a sign. Thus, a bourgeois paid three sols per league while a valet or a sailor paid one and a half sols per league. Payment offices were located along the route. Each office indicated the rate and provided the distances between each office.

Evolution of the number of passengers
Year	Number of passengers
1682	3,750 (over 6 months)
1740	12,500
1783	29,400
1831	71,000
1854	94,000
1856	100,000

The Canal relied on wheat and wine traffic in Languedoc which was its main purpose. This commercial traffic had the effect of enriching the descendants of Riquet very quickly. The wheat, wine, and alcohol could be exported from Lauragais to Toulouse, Bordeaux, and Marseille. The canal had the effect of broadening the sales area of the producers of Languedoc. In the 1730s commerce thrived and greatly improved agricultural businesses. The canal also allowed the import to Languedoc of products from other regions such as Marseille soap, rice, starch, dried fish, and spices and dyes. However, it was never the grand international route envisaged by the kings of France as its traffic was limited to local and national trade.

Freight rates depend on the cargo. Thus in the 17th century, the transportation of wheat cost 12 deniers per quintal and that of oats 6 deniers per quintal.

=== The boats ===
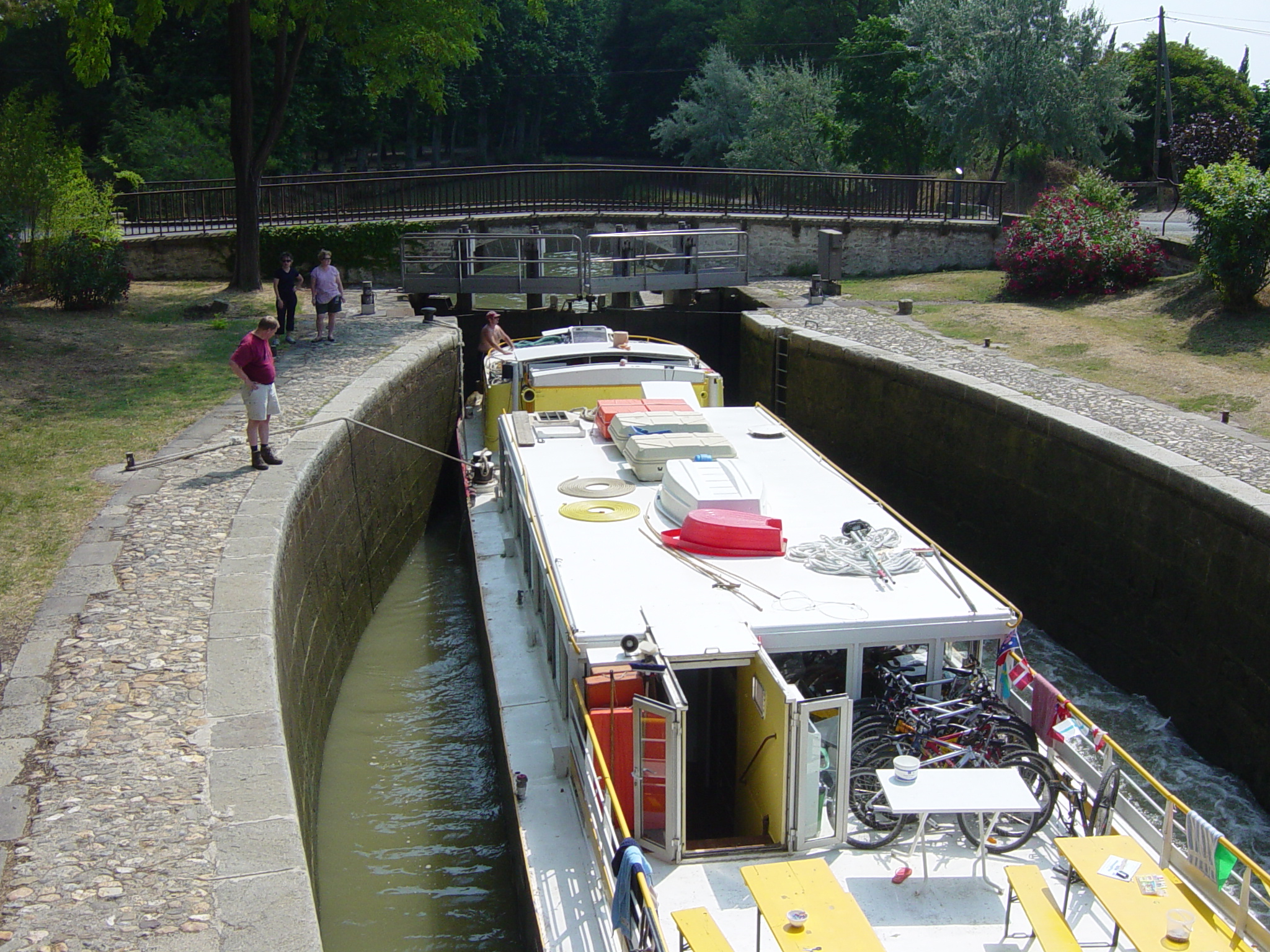
The barge Le Tourville in the lock chamber of Aiguille, a newer boat

At its opening the canal was used by a majority of boats for the transport of goods. These vessels were twenty metres long and were hauled by horses or men. The tonnage of vessels increased over the centuries, from 60 tonnes at the beginning to 120 tonnes at the start of the 19th century. The proper Canal Barges were called "owned barge" or "canal barge" and also plied the route. In 1778 there were about 250 barges. In 1914, there were 126 "owned boats", 70 rented boats, 300 horses, and 75 mules. In the year 1930 motor barges had completely replaced animal traction. They relaunched in part the merchant traffic on the canal but commercial and merchant inland water shipping finally disappeared around the late 1980s. The year 1856 was a record year for merchant activity with more than 110 million tonnes-kilometres of cargo and nearly 100,000 passengers carried.

For 250 years, horses have pulled many boats such as fast barges or long commercial boats. A horse can tow up to 120 times its weight when the load is on the water. Animal traction was then a strategic element in the operation of a canal.

The mail-barges or "post vehicles" which transported passengers were boats many metres long with a simple shelter on the deck. These boats evolved to become faster and more luxurious with lounges and were very large since the largest could reach 30 metres (98 ft) long. Services inside these vessels also evolved with first class in private salons and second class in a common room. During the heyday of the canal some boats included first class lounges where dinner was served.

=== Rail competition ===
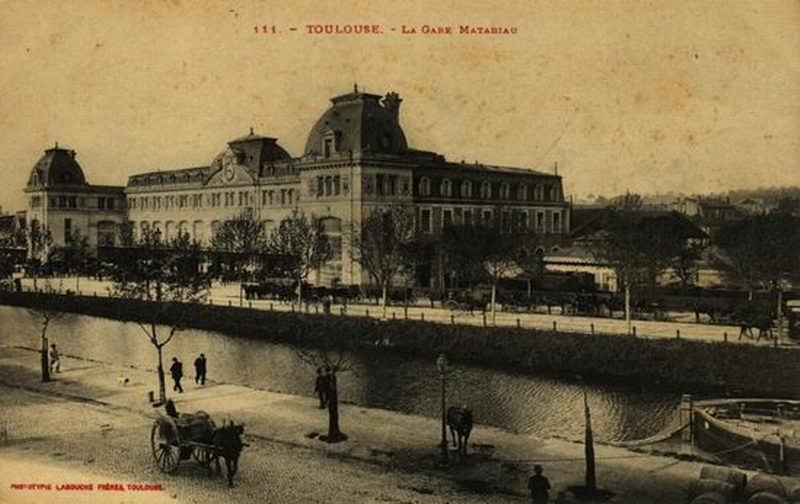
The Canal du Midi in front of the Matabiau Railway Station (opened in 1866) in Toulouse

Curiously, the canal did not really serve its purpose. The economic and political context hindered the economic development that had been expected. After two hundred years of operation, the canal began to suffer from competition from rail and road. It reached its peak in the middle of the 19th century. In 1858 Napoleon III signed a decree entrusting the canal for a period of 40 years to the Chemins de fer du Midi railway company, the owner of the Bordeaux-Narbonne railway line. This act had the effect of amplifying the decline in boat traffic on the canal. The company primarily promoted the railway and placed higher freight rates on commercial traffic in the canal. The Canal du Midi had the highest rates of any of France's waterway. In addition, the railway became smoother and faster than the waterway especially as the Canal du Midi suffered from its limited tonnage.

Evolution of Merchandise traffic in the 19th century
Year	1854	1856	1859	1879	1889	1896	1900	1909
Millions of tonnes-kilometres	67	110	59	54	32	28	66	80

The period before 1859 corresponded to the canal operating without competition while from 1859 the installation of railways in the south of France began. The effect of rail competition is clearly visible in the table with the halving of freight traffic between 1856 and 1879. The traffic then continued to decline gradually. As for the railway, the Bordeaux–Sète railway carried almost 200 million tonne-kilometres in 1860. Management of the canal was taken over by the State in 1898 who made successive investments to maintain its competitiveness. The state removed taxes and tolls which had the effect of reviving traffic on the canal to which reached 80 million tonne-kilometres in 1909.

=== The end of merchant traffic ===
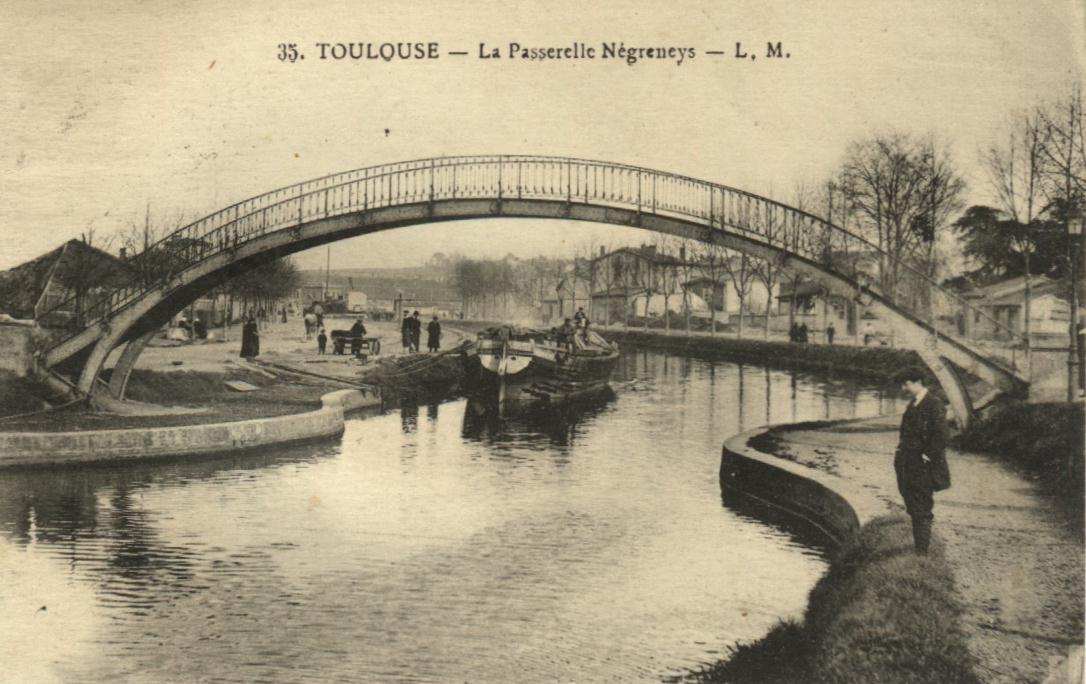
Transport of goods at Toulouse

The government tried to revive the renovation of the canal by enacting a legal program to lift the channel to the standards of the Freycinet gauge. The canals of northern France were already at this level and had traffic well above the Canal du Midi. However, the law remained unimplemented due to lack of funds.

Evolution of merchant traffic in the 20th century
Year	1918	1939	1970	1979
Millions of tonnes-kilometres (tkm)	19	100	110	40

At the end of the First World War traffic was completely disorganized. In 1920 freight traffic recovered rapidly with the arrival of motorised barges. The HPLM company (Le Havre-Paris-Lyon-Marseille) operated 30 boats on the Canal du Midi. The Second World War saw a slowdown in traffic due to the shortage of oil but recovery was rapid after the conflict and the traffic reached 110 million km. However, the canal suffered from a size too small for later barges with high tonnage. Rail became more and more competitive and road transport also became a second competitor. The Canal du Midi became the third means of transport. Freight traffic ceased in the 1970s. In 1980 there were only two barges (the Bacchus, a wine carrier and the Espérance, a grain carrier) carrying regular traffic between Toulouse and Sète: they definitively ceased their activities in 1989 following the cessation of navigation pronounced by the Prefect of the Region due to drought. In 1991 operation of the canal was assigned to the administration of Voies navigables de France who remain managers today.

=== The canal in the 21st century ===
From the end of the 20th century, the canal has offered many activities. It can again play its original role in allowing the transit of boats between the Atlantic Ocean and the Mediterranean Sea.

==== A canal for tourism and recreation ====
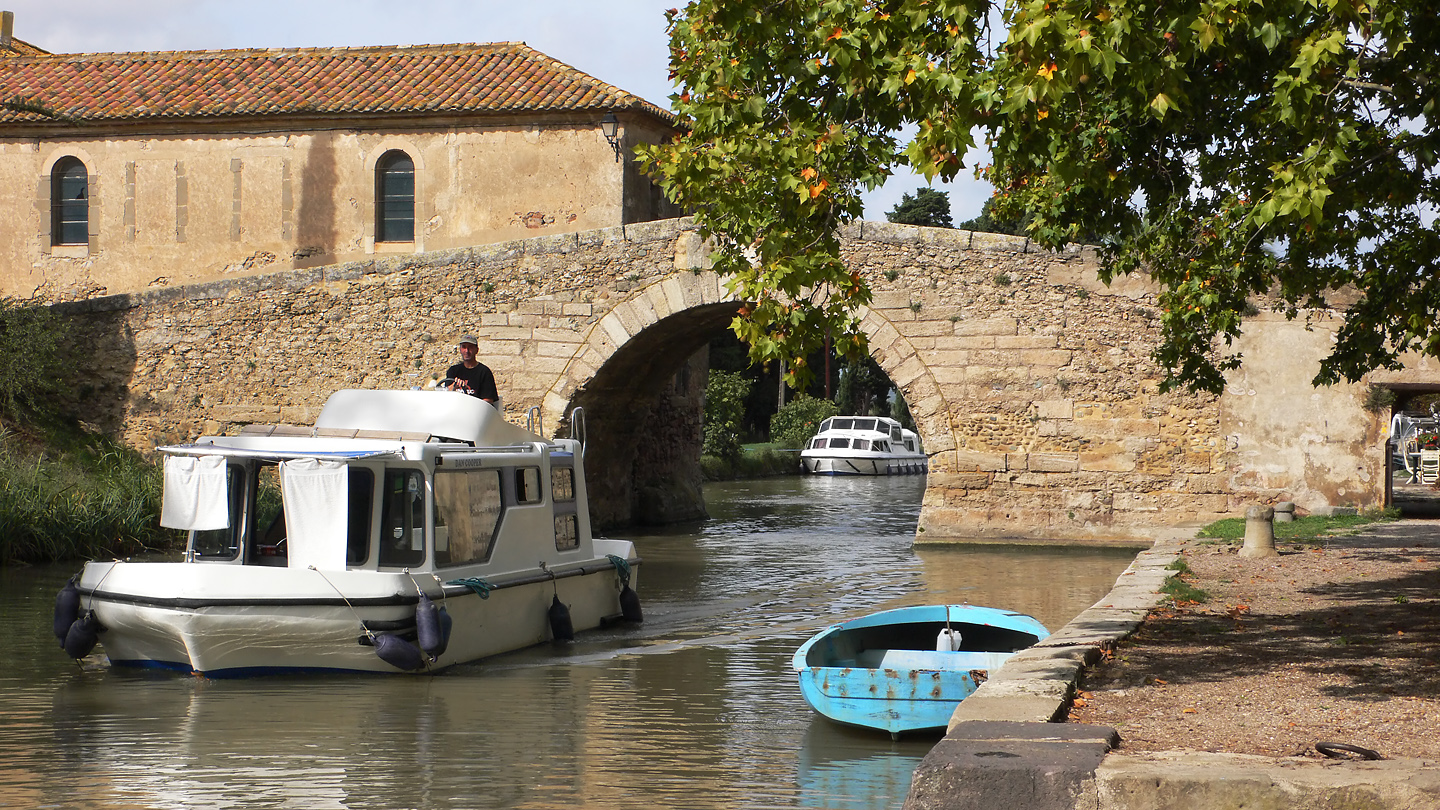
Pleasure-boating has replaced commerce on the Canal du Midi (the hamlet of Somail).

The Canal du Midi is now used primarily by tourists, recreation, and housing.

It attracts more and more river tourism, including sailing on chartered boats, restaurant-boats, or hotel barges such as the Anjodi. Tourism has grown from the 1960s, most significantly from Britain, and then exploded in the 1980s. The canal was featured prominently in the BBC television series Rick Stein's French Odyssey (2005), further publicising the canal to a British audience. Busier than the Seine, the canal alone accounts for one-fifth of French river tourism and 80% of passengers are foreigners, primarily Germans, Swiss and British. There are approximately 10,000 boat passages per year through the Fonséranes locks, with the most traffic at the Argens lock with 11,000 boats carrying an average of five passengers. The canal directly employs about 1,900 people, and the annual economic impact due to the activity of the canal is about 122 million euros.

Navigation of the channel is open from the third Saturday in March to the first week of November. Outside of this period, navigation can be authorized for individuals who have requested it. The winter period is called the "period of unemployment" and allows the completion of all maintenance work.

The Canal du Midi also allows other sports, mainly in urban areas, such as rowing, canoeing, fishing, cycling, roller-skating, and hiking along the banks. A paved stretch of 50 km (31 mi) from Toulouse to Avignonet-Lauragais and another of 12 km (7.5 mi) between Béziers and Portiragnes are particularly suited to cycling and rollerblading. It is possible to cycle the entire Canal des Deux Mers from Sète to Bordeaux. In addition, many barges have been converted to family housing, theatres, exhibition spaces, and restaurants.

==== A canal for water ====
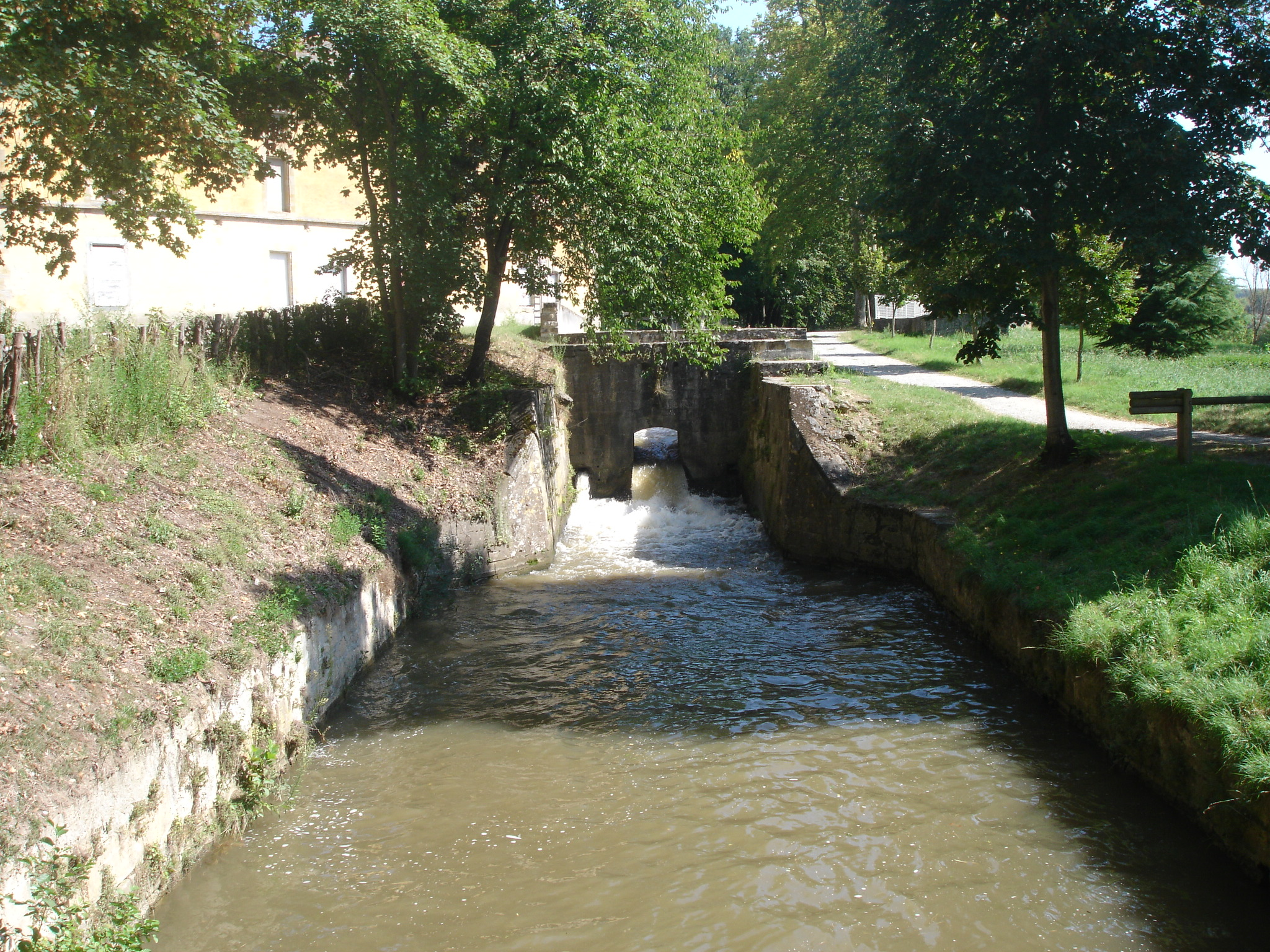
Arrival of the Rigole de la plaine in the basin of Naurouze, the main source of water for the Canal du Midi

During the dry season, the canal serves as a reservoir for agriculture. Nearly 700 irrigation pumps are installed along the canal. This is one of the fundamental roles of the canal and one of the reasons for its maintenance by the State since the end of commercial traffic. The canal can irrigate up to 40,000 hectares (150 sq mi) of agricultural land.

The Rigole de la plaine carries water from the Sor tapped from an offtake at Pont Crouzet for irrigation before emptying into the Canal du Midi. In addition, individual samples are collected from the water on the area between Revel and the seuil de Naurouze. In 1980 the Lac de la Ganguise was built near Castelnaudary providing a water reserve of 22 million cubic metres. In 2005 the dam was raised to reach a capacity of 44 million cubic metres. Near the old basin of Naurouze the Naurouze pumping station helps to regulate the water in the Canal du Midi and the lake. An underground pipe, the gallery of Mandore, provides the Naurouze with additional water from the Rigole de la plaine to Lake Ganguise. Conversely, during the dry season, Lake Ganguise can supply the Canal du Midi if the water supply of the Rigole de la plaine is not enough.

The canal has also provided a supply of drinking water through the water treatment plants at Picotalen (Picotalen I and Picotalen II) since 1973. They are part of the installations installed by the Institution for Interdepartmental Hydraulic Planning of Montagne Noire (IIAHMN) since its inception in 1948 to meet the water needs of Lauragais. The plant supplies water from the Cammazes channel to nearly 185 communes.

==== The Canal as heritage ====
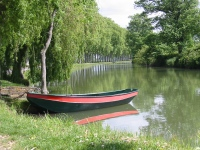
Boat on the Canal du Midi to the south of Toulouse

While the canal was once seen as a tool of production, trade, and commerce it is now considered to be architectural and technical heritage as evidenced by the refusal of the mayor of Toulouse, Pierre Baudis, to allow space on the Canal du Midi to be used for an urban expressway. It has not been downgraded and remains open for navigation. On 7 December 1996 the channel and a buffer zone of 2,000 km^{2} were included in the list of World Heritage Sites by UNESCO. In the same year, it was classified under French law as a Grand Site of France. This classification was extended to the canals of the plain and the mountain in 1996 and 2001. It caused a very rapid increase in tourist numbers.

Nevertheless, maintenance has not been carried out completely because many players are involved: two Regions, six Departments, and local collective authorities. None wish to bear the cost of restoration and do not always dare to launch development programs. Platanus (plane trees) is a particular source of problems because their roots destroy the banks and the paved cycle paths and their leaves invade the canal. In addition they are weakened by disease (canker of Platanus). The canal is a heavy heritage to maintain and enhance as the manager of French canals, Voies navigables de France (VNF), specializes in the management and maintenance of French canals in a market and commercial economy and not in the tourism market where the Canal du Midi is located. In addition maintenance costs are higher than in a traditional network because of the age of the canal. Also, the operation of the channel generates low levels of earnings. VNF must try to establish local partnerships to develop and maintain the canal since its budget does not allow it to provide the care and supervision of 360 km (220 mi) of canals.

The classification as a World Heritage Site creates an additional level of oversight by the State who must ensure that any changes along the canal and its structures are compatible with the strategic issues of UNESCO. However, a report of the General Inspectorate of Architecture and Heritage in 2003 showed that the channel was in very poor condition with many works and infrastructure devaluing its surroundings and suffering from significant housing pressure evidenced by uncontrolled construction, poorly designed facilities that misrepresent the site, and the construction of marinas in the ports on the canal. Nevertheless, to respect the uniformity of the canal development and support efforts for improvement, the Canal du Midi remains under the management of VNF under the tutelage of the State who want to create a monitoring mission like the Loire and Mont-Saint-Michel.

== The structures ==
The Canal du Midi is 240 km (150 mi) long with a total of 328 structures including 63 locks, (Note: The number here is the number of separate locations of locks. The numbers given in Locks on the Canal du Midi count the number of individual lock chambers hence the discrepancy) 126 bridges, 55 aqueducts, 7 aqueducts, 6 dams, 1 spillway, and 1 tunnel.

=== Water supply for the canal ===
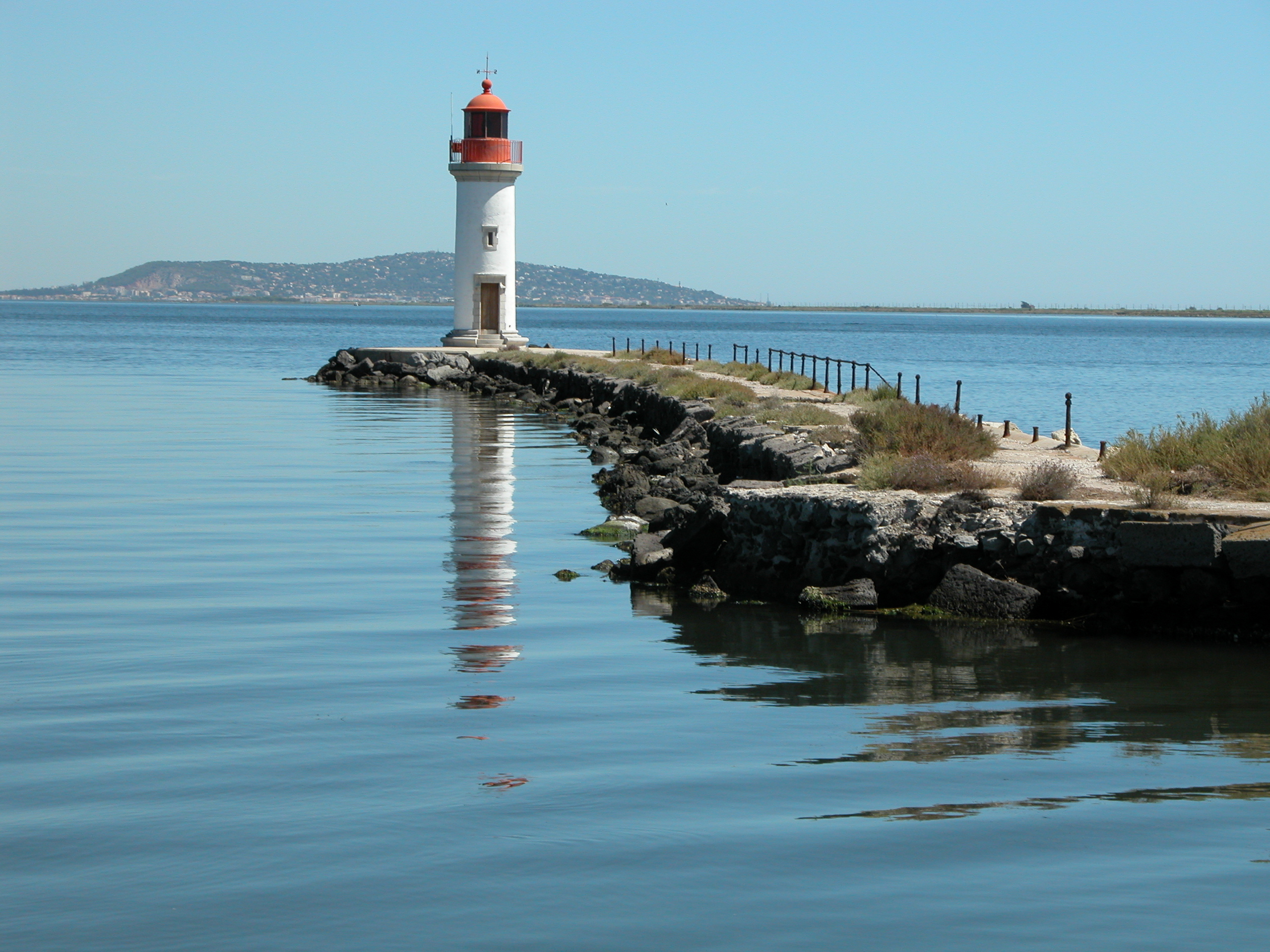
The Canal du Midi Thau joins the étang de Thau at Onglous. In the background is Sète hill (Mont Saint-Clair).

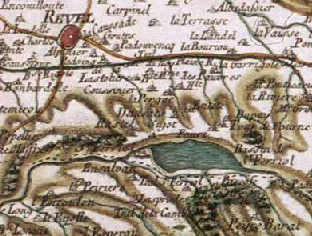
The Cassini map showing the Bassin de Saint-Ferréol, the key of the water supply to the canal

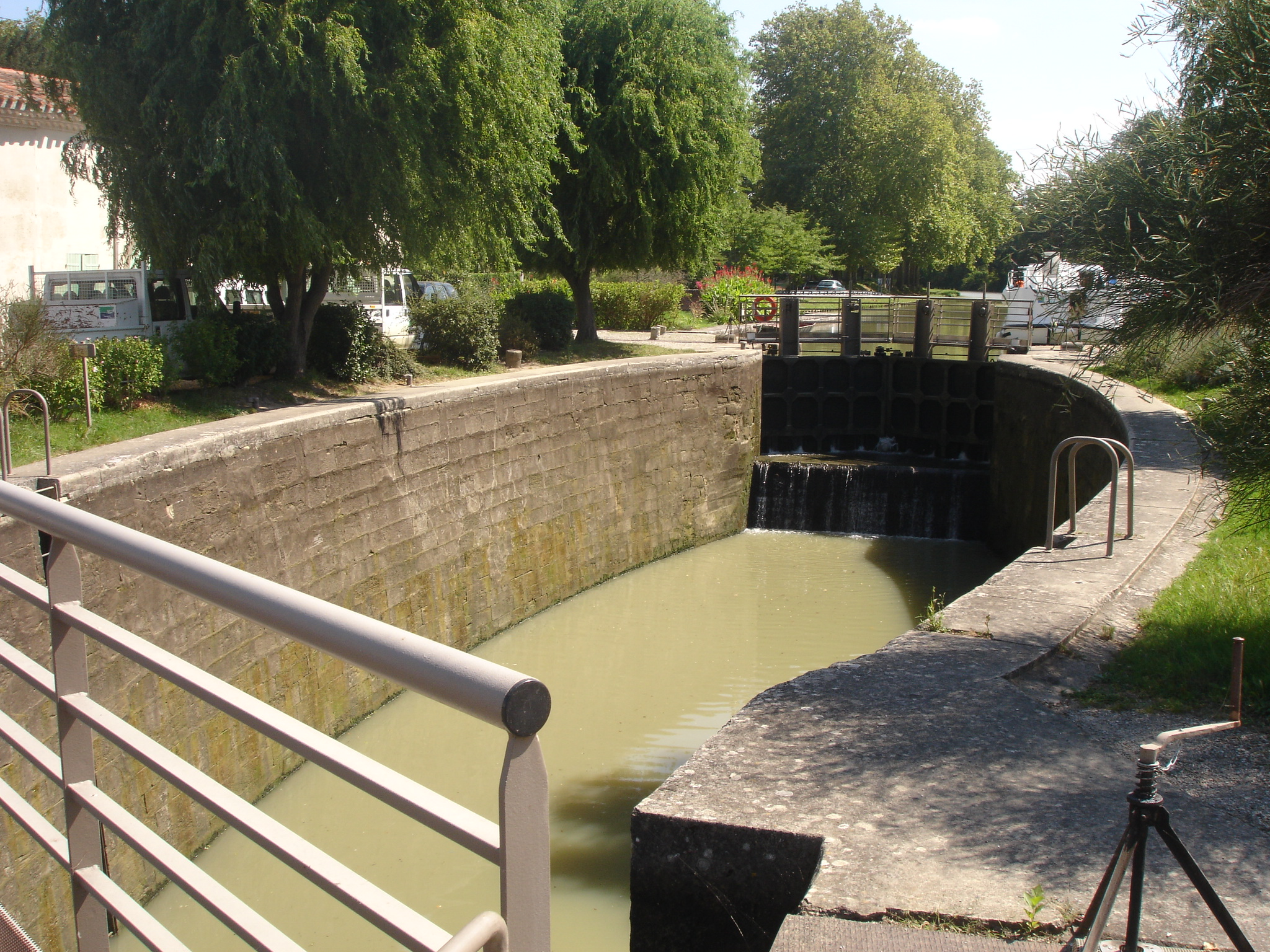
The Négra Lock with its rounded side walls, which are features of the Canal du Midi.

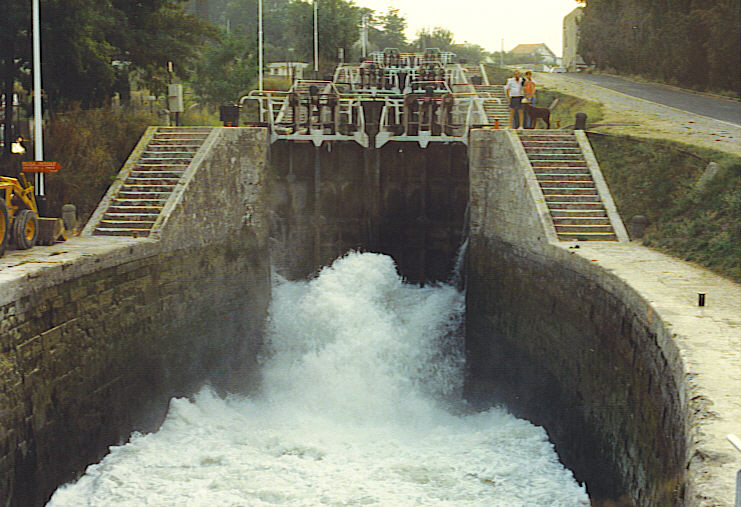
Seven connected locks at Fonséranes, Béziers

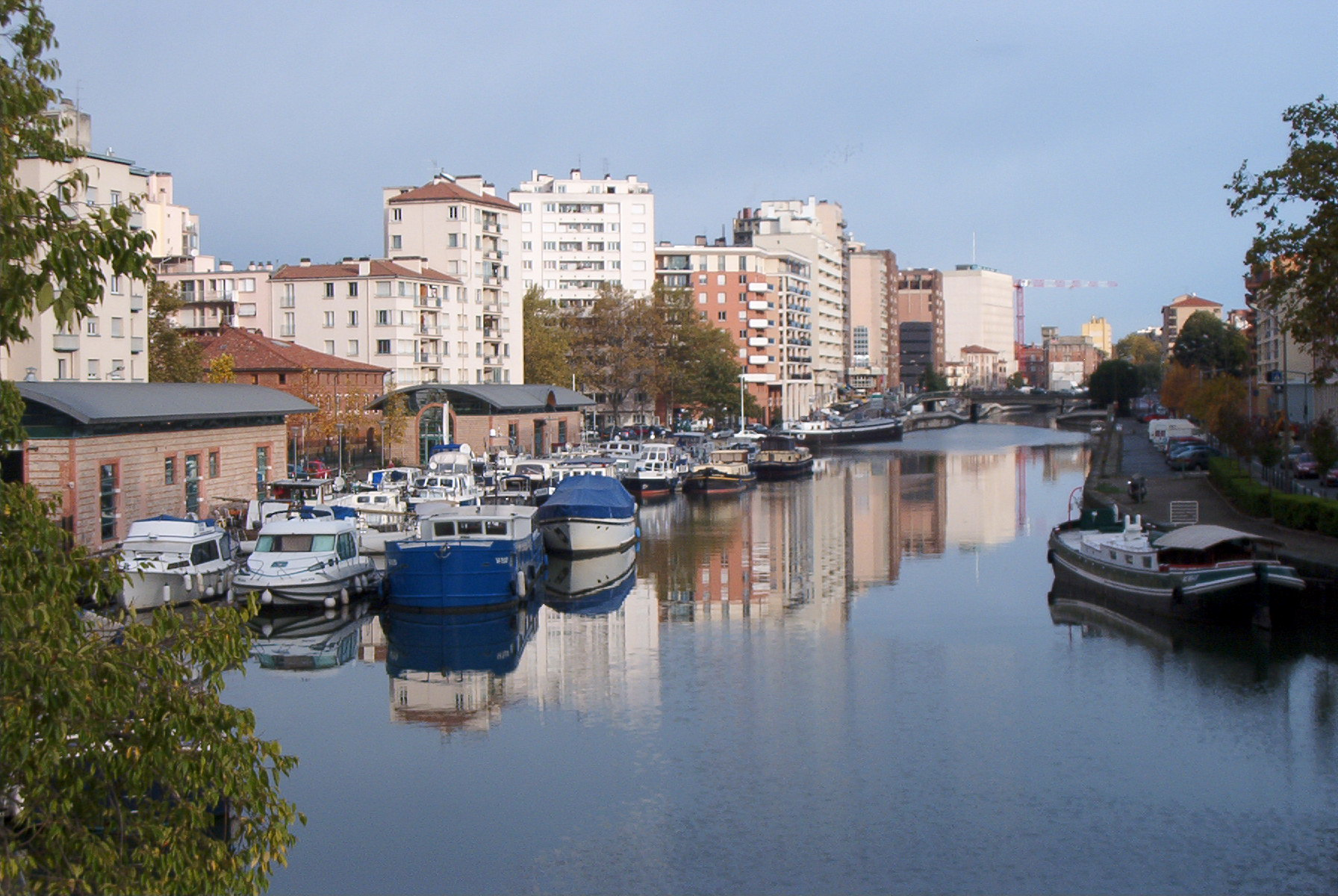
Port Saint-Sauveur at Toulouse

It takes 90 million cubic metres of water to feed the canal for one year. To do this, Riquet set up a complex system of water supply to the canal. The idea was to capture the waters of the Montagne Noire located several tens of kilometres away and bring it to the Seuil de Naurouze, the highest point of the future canal, through channels.

These channels, called "Rigole de la montagne" (Channel of the Mountain) and "Rigole de la plaine" (Channel of the Plain) connected the upper three reservoirs (Lampy, Cammazes, and Saint-Ferréol) at the seuil de Naurouze. The Rigole de la Montagne measured 24.269 km (15.080 mi) long and has 22 structures between the outlet at Alzeau and the falls of Cammazes. The Rigole de la Plaine measured 38.121 km (23.687 mi) long at 21.45 m (70.4 ft) altitude and included 68 structures between the Crouzet bridge and the seuil de Naurouze.

Initially, two reservoirs fed the highest point of the canal at the seuil de Naurouze: the Bassin de Saint-Ferréol had a capacity of 6.3 million cubic metres and was built between 1667 and 1672. The other reservoir was much smaller - the Bassin de Lampy. Called "Lampy-Vieux", it was quickly replaced by the "Lampy-Neuf" with a capacity of 1,672,000 cubic metres built over a hundred years later between 1777 and 1782.

The Bassin de Saint-Ferréol was and remains the main water reservoir for the canal with a surface of 67 hectares (170 acres). It receives the waters of the Montagne Noire via the Channel of the Mountain which is itself supplied by the basin of Lampy. The lake waters are retained by a dam 786 m (2,579 ft) long and 149 m (489 ft) wide consisting of three parallel walls. The channel surrounds the basin and can evacuate any excess water. A museum is located near the outlets and has displays on the history of the construction of the Lake.

Originally the engineer planned and built a third reservoir, the Naurouze, but it was abandoned in 1680 due to its excessive silting. Pierre-Paul Riquet had dreamed of the construction of a new city around this basin that never saw the day. A floodway was quickly dug to drain the Naurouze basin from the south.

Other reservoirs were also built at Carcassonne to supply the lower part of the canal to the Mediterranean. So the waters of the Fresquel, the Cesse, and the Orbiel augmented those of the canal. On the other hand, the waters of the Orb at Béziers provided additional flow to part of the canal. In 1957 the Cammazes dam with a capacity of 20 million cubic metres of water was filled on the Sor which completed and finalized the supply network. This lake provides drinking water to more than 200 communes in the region. Of the 20 million cubic metres, 4 million are reserved for feeding the Canal du Midi.

=== The locks ===
The first locks built on the Toulouse plain by Pierre-Paul Riquet were experimental and were not satisfactory. They consisted of rectangular locks with wooden stilts as foundations for the side walls. This form did not properly restrain the lateral material when the lock was empty. They then collapsed on themselves. He redefined the shape of his locks to rounded side walls, (Note: Protective walls in the chamber of the lock) thicker, and more resistant to the lateral pressure of the earth. The dimensions of the locks were then large enough for the time. Because of these rounded forms, the architecture of the locks in the Canal du Midi is called Baroque style.

The locks were built in stone and sealed with lime. They are closed by two double leaf doors. The doors, originally timber with the fewest possible metal parts, are subject to severe moisture stress and pressure. They had a "vantelle" (valve) controlled by a rack and pinion that allowed the draining of water from the lock chamber.

The nominal size of the locks built by Pierre-Paul Riquet was 29.2 m (96 ft) long, 5.8 m (19 ft) wide at the door, 11 m (36 ft) wide in the centre of the lock and an average of 2.5 m (8.2 ft) in height. In the 20th century, many locks were changed and therefore no longer have the original features.

At the town of Béziers there is a staircase of eight locks at Fonsérannes to bring it to the river Orb. The locks had to be cut from solid rock, and descended a hillside whose gradient varied. All the locks had to contain the same volume of water, but could not have precisely the same shape. Nonetheless, they were built successfully without a need for repair. This intricate piece of engineering was subcontracted out to two illiterate brothers, the Medhailes, and was built by a workforce composed mainly of women.

Some of the locks on the canal are architectural gems. For instance, the Agde Round Lock has three doors: two doors provide access to each side of the channel and the third provides access to the Hérault going to the Mediterranean. This system allows triple access while protecting the canal from river flooding. Similarly, the canal has several multiple locks – i.e. with multiple locks attached to one another. This system saves doors and foundations in areas where the slope is greatest. The best known of these locks is Fonserannes Lock which has eight chambers.

Today most of the locks are electrified which replaced the manual opening of the sluices and lock gates.

=== The ports ===
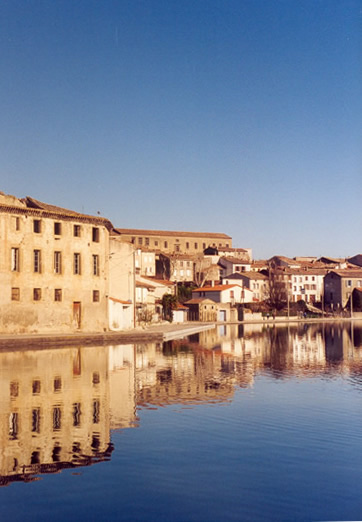
The basin of the Canal du Midi at Castelnaudary, one of the ports on the canal

Several ports were built at regular intervals along the route of the canal in order to load and unload goods and also to provide stopping-places for travellers. Toulouse has two ports: the port de l'Embouchure is located at the junction of the Canal du Midi, the Canal de Brienne, and the Lateral canal of the Garonne while Port Saint-Sauveur is located in the centre of town near the Hall of Grains. There were two other ports in Toulouse but they were destroyed for urban development. So the Port des Minimes and the Port Saint-Etienne were replaced by towpaths.

Castelnaudary has a port of 7 hectares (17 acres) called Grand Bassin built between 1666 and 1671. It served as a stopover halfway between Toulouse and Sète. Cybelle island in the middle of the basin was used to protect the barges from the wind. Carcassonne is today a major tourist stop on the canal and has a port built in 1810 at the time when the city was connected to the canal. The port of Trèbes is a major port which has numerous moorings for boats. There are also the ports of Homps which was one of the most important on the canal and Le Somail which was a popular place for rest and recreation. Finally, just before its arrival at the Mediterranean Sea, the canal has two ports: the port of Agde where there is the old hotel of the "Administration of the Canal", and the port of Onglous at Marseillan which is the last port before Sète and its royal canal giving access to the sea.

Newer ports were built such as Ramonville-Saint-Agne, called Port-Sud, which has many residential barges and is set directly overlooking the harbour, and Port-Lauragais located near Avignonet-Lauragais on a service area of the A61 autoroute.

=== The aqueducts ===
Related article: Aqueducts on the Canal du Midi

Several aqueducts (Note: An aqueduct is a 'canal bridge' (pont-canal in French) carrying a canal over a river or valley, or any depression in the terrain. The same word in English is used for any overhead structure carrying water, while the French equivalent aqueduc refers to a water conveyance structure or (as in the case of the Canal du Mid) a siphon or culvert under the canal. This chapter refers only to the actual aqueducts carrying the canal itself, and not the secondary hydraulic structures.) were built along the route of the Canal du Midi. They allow the canal to cross rivers that could disrupt the water flow in the canal. In fact, the rivers flowing into the canal cause an overflow of water during flooding and fill the canal with silt. Some aqueducts date from the time of Pierre-Paul Riquet, but most were built after the completion of the canal in particular due to improvements recommended by Vauban. The canal has the following aqueducts (in order from Agde to Toulouse):

- Orb aqueduct (PK 208) which was inaugurated in 1857, eliminating the difficult crossing of the river Orb
- Cesse aqueduct (PK 168)
- Répudre aqueduct (PK 159) was built between 1667 and 1676 to span the Répudre near the village of Paraza. The Répudre is a small tributary of the Aude in which the flow is too variable especially in winter (bridge length: 135 m [443 ft]). It was also the first aqueduct built by Pierre-Paul Riquet
- Orbiel aqueduct at Trèbes (PK 117)
- Fresquel aqueduct (PK 109) was built beginning in 1800 and opened on 31 May 1810, as a result of the realignment of the route to pass through the centre of the city of Carcassonne, a city that refused to pay a share of the cost when the canal was first built
- Herbettes aqueduct, (PK 8), a new aqueduct at Toulouse completed in 1983, 74 m (243 ft) long, to cross a four-lane motorway.

=== Other structures ===
Pierre-Paul Riquet and the engineers who followed him over three centuries built many other structures on the Canal du Midi, of which the most important are listed here:

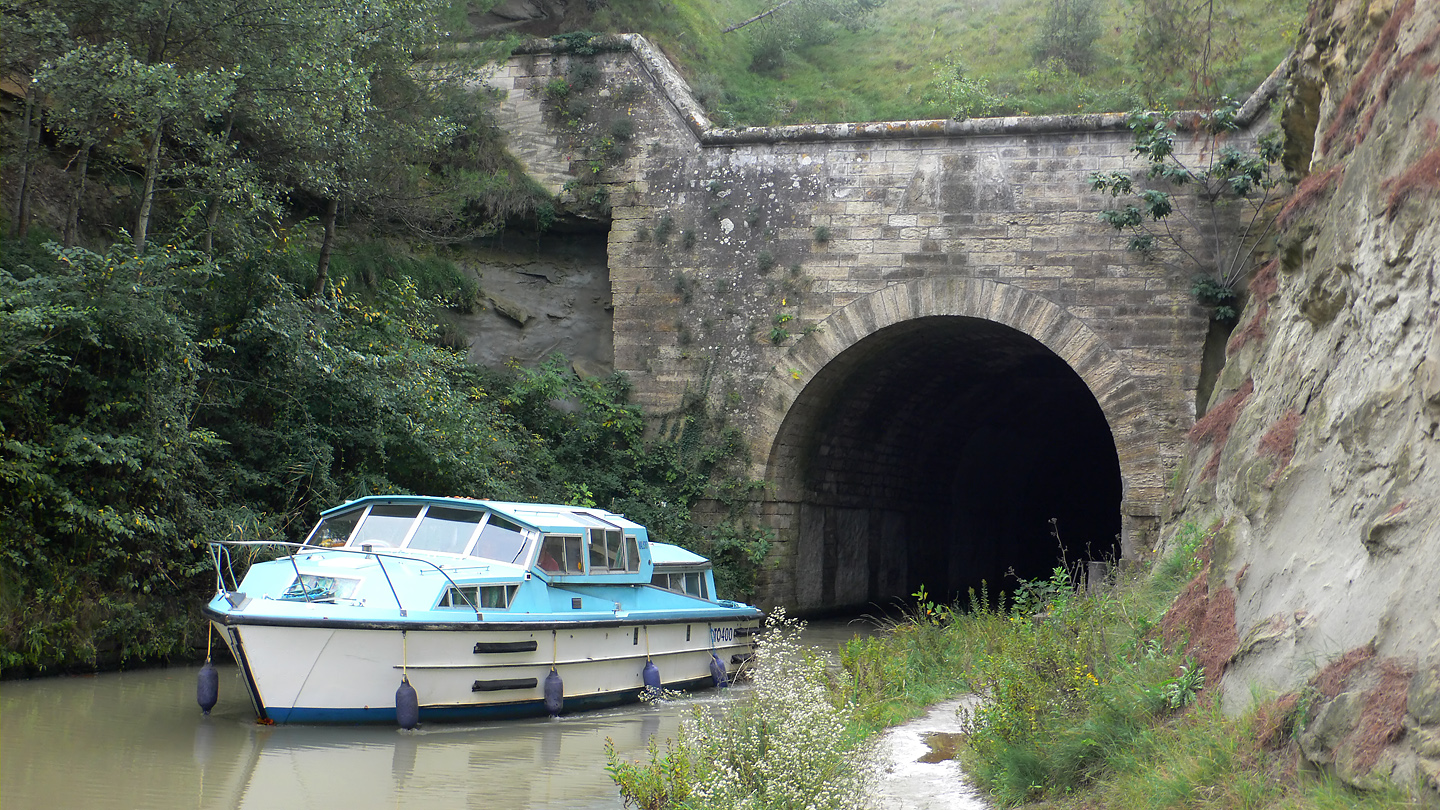
The Malpas Tunnel

- the Malpas Tunnel 165 m (541 ft) long southeast of the Oppidum d'Ensérune which passes through a hill 50 m (160 ft) above sea level and was a technical challenge for the time

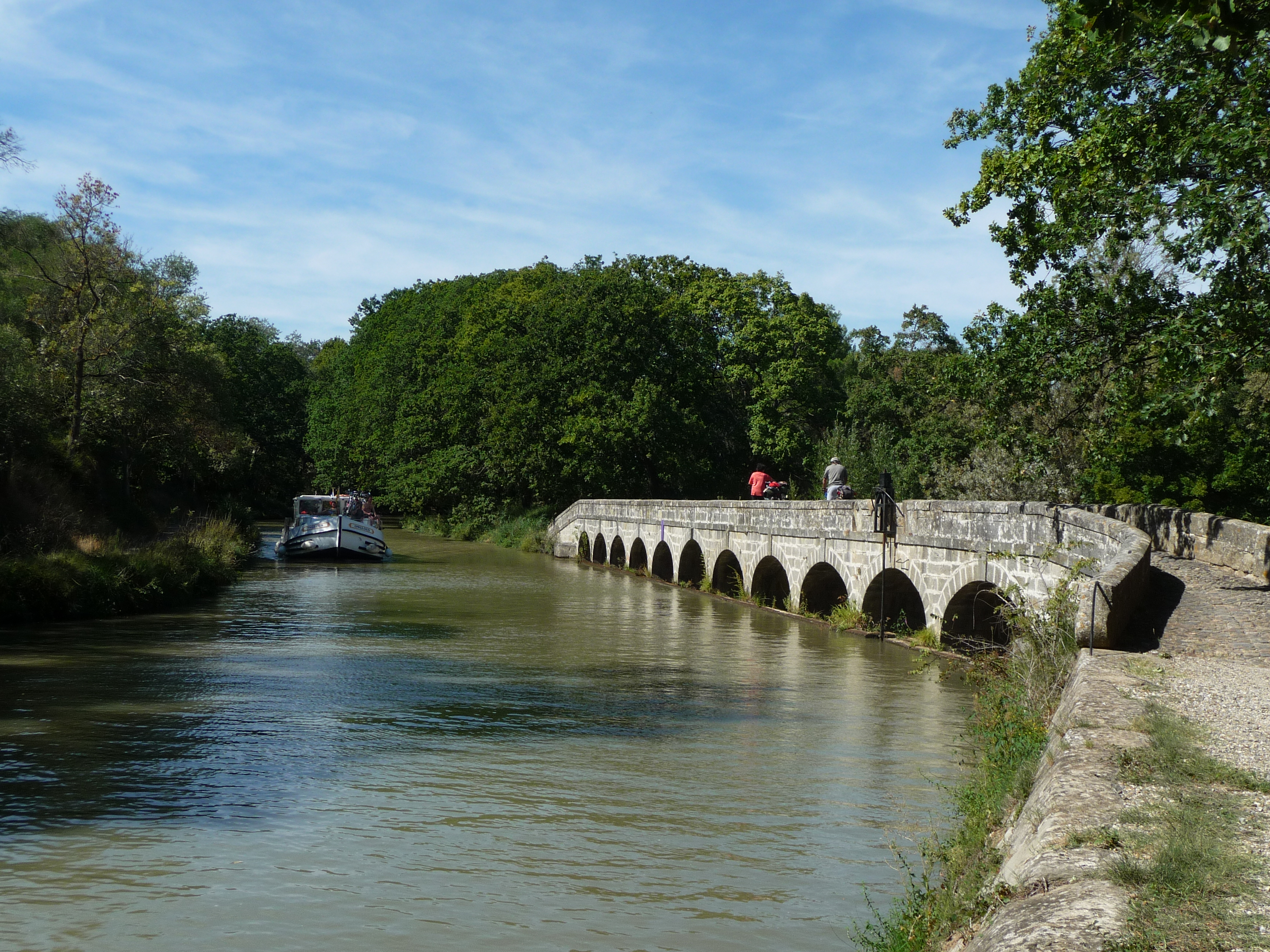
The Argent-Double spillway and its 11 successive arches.

- the Argent-Double spillway located in La Redorte near the Argent-Double Aqueduct: this work incorporates eleven successive stone arches contemporary to Vauban, its designer; it was built by Antoine de Niquet and allows for the overflow water from the canal to be discharged into the stream

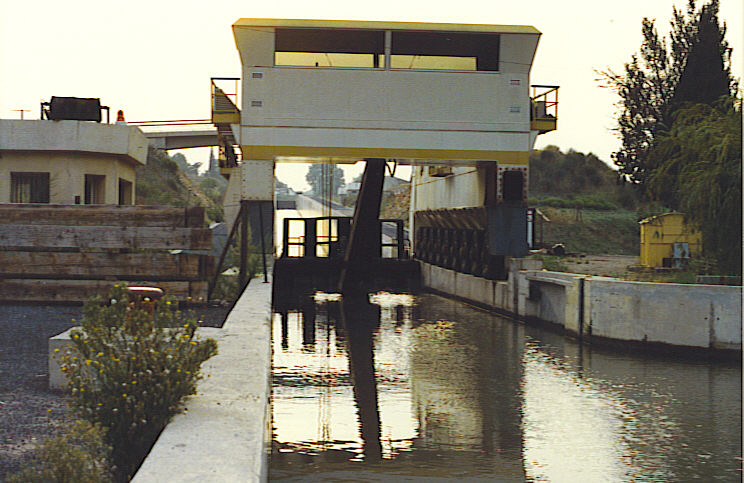
The Water slope at Fonséranes, not a work contemporary with Riquet.

- the Fonserannes water slope, which bypasses the 6-lock staircase at Fonserannes, was built at the time when the canal was to be upgraded to Freycinet gauge to save time and allow larger vessels to work on. It has a unique machinery whose maintenance is expensive, but for several years, VNF has attempted to rehabilitate it to reduce waiting times at the Fonséranes locks

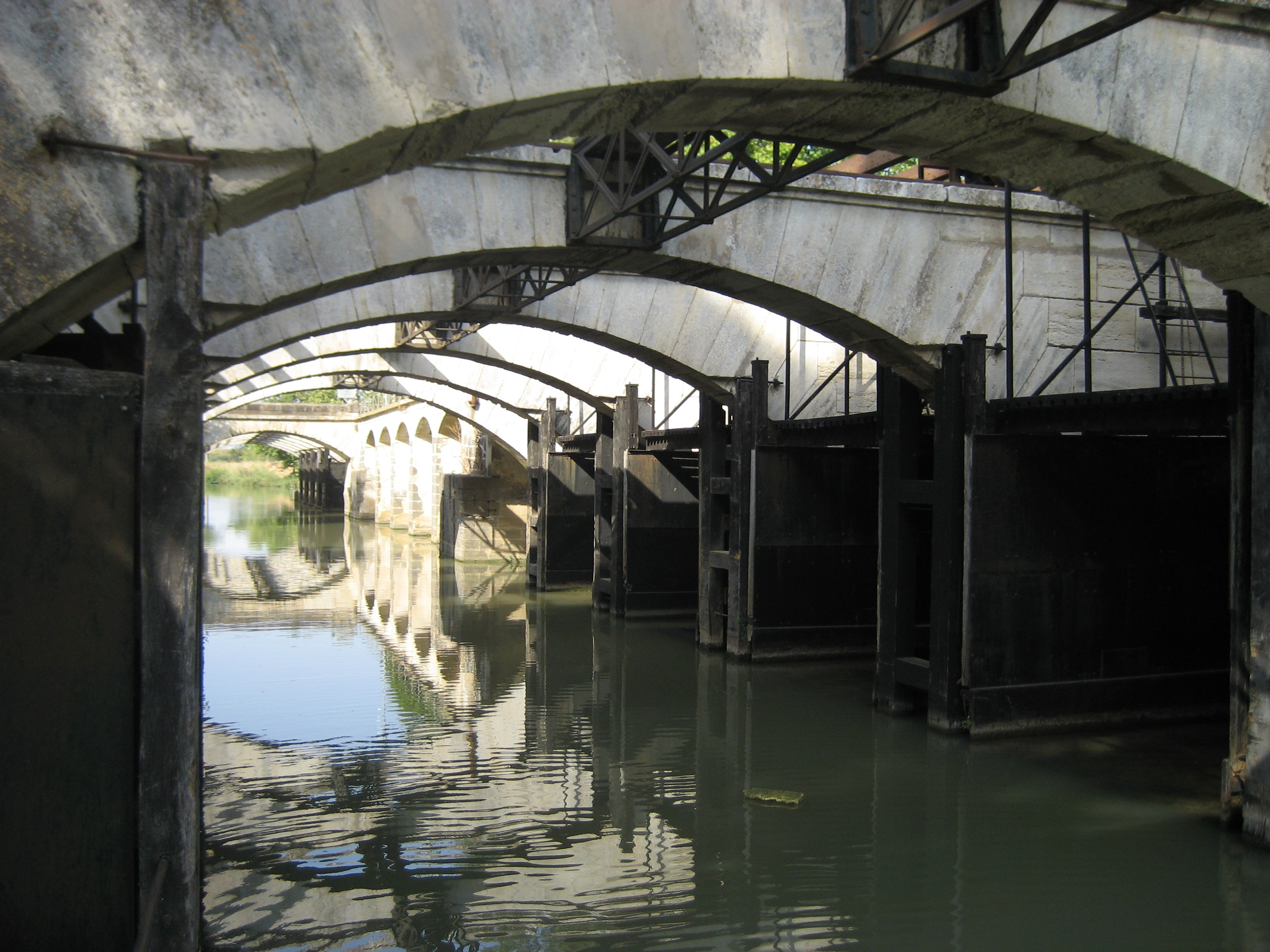
The Ouvrages du Libron

- the Ouvrages du Libron (the works of Libron), a unique achievement of its kind which allows the canal to cross the course of the Libron near Agde
- the watermills of the Canal du Midi are located in derivation of the number of locks (e.g. Naurouze, Gay, Trèbes, Matabiau, Minimes, Castelnaudary, Castanet, Beziers, etc.) and used the water height differences to power Quern-stones to grind grain from the commissioning of the canal. Thereafter, they become real Gristmills during the 18th century.

== Flora and fauna ==
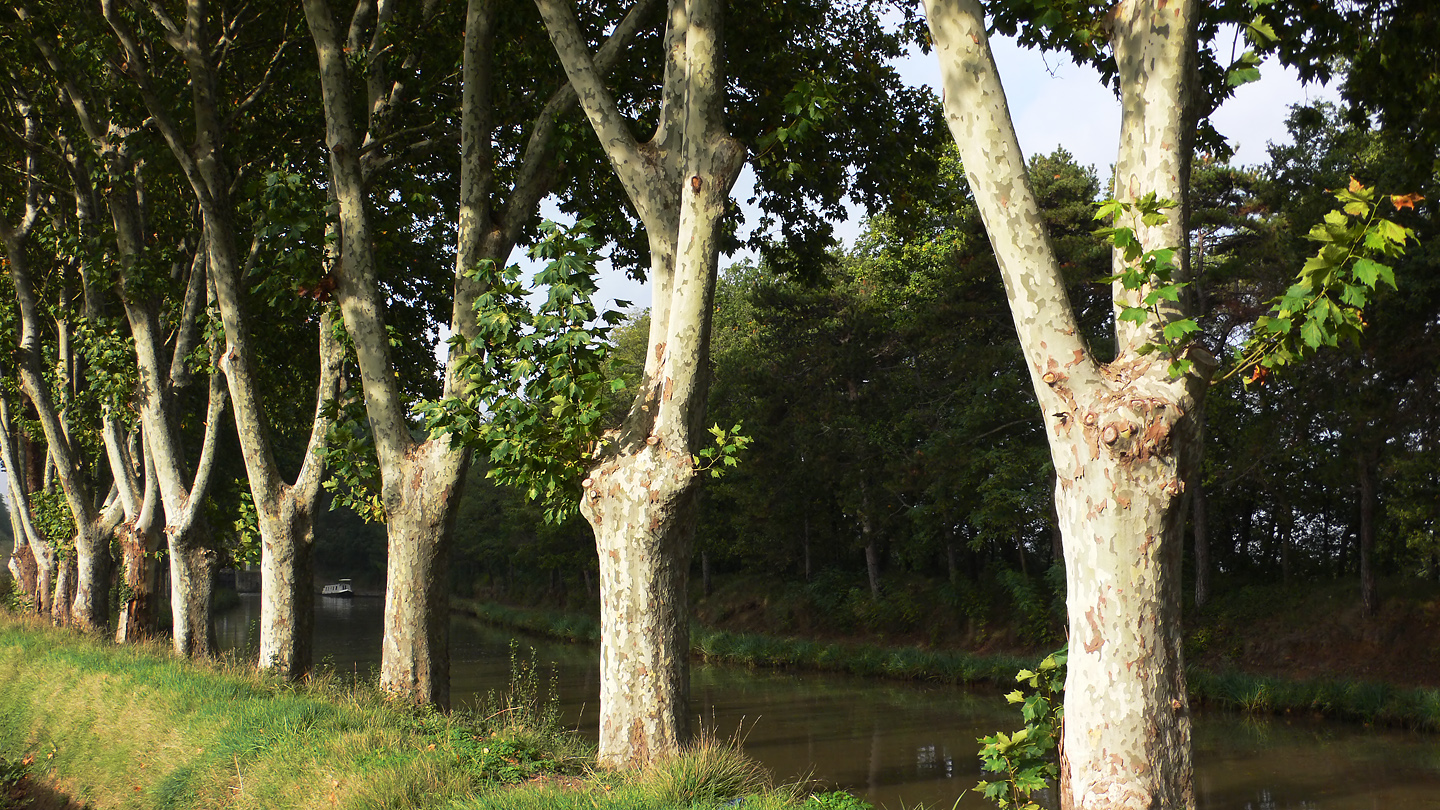
The plane trees on the canal du Midi

The canal is a long ribbon of water stretching through the landscape and attracts many animal species. Several species of fish such as bream breed in the canal, and others reproduce in its feeding rivers and spend part of their life in the canal. Molluscs such as anadontes, a kind of freshwater mussel, and corbicules, a kind of freshwater clam, occur in the canal. Invasive Coypu (River rat or nutria) and Muskrats introduced from the Americas burrow into the banks, which they damage. Finally, many animals and birds come to drink water from the canal.

The canal is also a very vegetated place. In the beginning, Pierre-Paul Riquet planted trees to stabilize the banks of the canal especially where it overlooked the surrounding lands. The willow was widely used for its rapid growth. The engineer also planted irises on the side of the canal to reduce subsidence of its banks. In the 18th century, the trees planted along the canal become a source of income. So mulberries were planted for rearing silkworms. Then, with the end of the silk culture in 1772, the mulberry trees were replaced by the poplar from Italy which was the most productive wood. Structures and lock-keepers' houses were decorated with fruit trees. At the time of the French Revolution plantations around the canal had approximately 60,000 trees when there were only 45,000 at the beginning. It was under the First Empire that plane trees began to be planted to replace the cut trees, which are today the dominant variety along the canal.

However, for several years, plane trees have been infected with canker stain, a disease caused by a microscopic fungus called Ceratocystis platani. The first outbreaks were detected in 2006 with the number of infected plane trees reaching 83 in 2008 and 153 in 2009. Selective tree-felling campaigns have been conducted to try to stop the spread but with no effect. In addition, there is no effective treatment against the disease. In 2011, 211 places and 1,338 diseased trees have been identified. In 15 to 20 years all 42,000 plane trees of the Canal du Midi will have to be felled and replaced mainly by other species (ash, lime), after initial experiments with a variety of plane-tree resisting the parasite.

== The Canal du Midi as a model ==
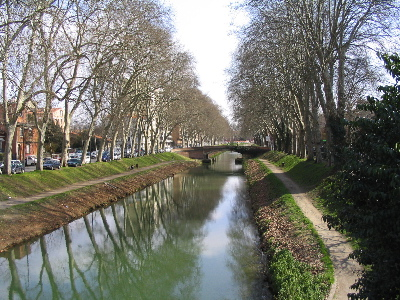
The Canal du Midi, near Toulouse

The Canal du Midi was one of the great achievements of the late 17th century. Riquet understood the hydraulic system of the Montagne Noire and had controlled it to serve the Canal du Midi. King Louis XIV, who was the sponsor, also left it as a mark of his commitment to grandeur.

The canal was also magnified by the Encyclopedia or Reasoned Dictionary of Science, Arts, and Crafts by Diderot and D'Alembert in 1765 who highlighted its value and greatness. They compare it to Roman constructions. Another encyclopedia writer, Joseph Jerome Lefrancois Lalande lauded the architectural and hydraulic achievement in his work The navigation canals and especially the Canal de Languedoc in 1778. Similarly, Bernard Forest de Bélidor congratulated the designer in Hydraulic Architecture. The canal became an example in Europe as throughout the Age of Enlightenment it was the only canal of this size in Europe.

The American Thomas Jefferson, politician, architect, and future president of the United States, came to study the Canal du Midi in 1787. As the United States Ambassador to France he envisaged the construction of a similar work to link the Potomac River to Lake Erie.

In the 1820s the Hungarian reformer István Széchenyi visited France and was greatly impressed with the Canal du Midi in France. It inspired him to envision ways to improve navigation on the lower Danube and Tisza, which he implemented later in his career.

== People linked to the canal ==
- Pierre-Paul Riquet, designer of the Canal du Midi. He obtained from the king the ownership and operation of the Canal du Midi for life for himself and his descendants. He died in October 1680 shortly before its completion.
- Jean-Baptiste Colbert, Louis XIV's Controller-General of Finances who was commissioned by the king to assess the cost and feasibility of the project.
- Sebastien Le Prestre de Vauban, the royal architect and engineer who made many improvements to the canal between 1685 and 1686
- François Andreossy, a close associate and deputy of Pierre-Paul Riquet who continued the work after the Riquet's death.
- Louis Nicolas de Clerville an engineer who controlled and oversaw the works and advised Riquet.

== See also ==
- Aqueducts on the Canal du Midi
- Canal de Garonne
- Épanchoir de Foucaud
- Fonsérannes Locks
- Fonserannes water slope
- Galaube Lake
- La Nouvelle branch
- Le Somail
- Locks on the Canal du Midi
- Pont Marengo, in Carcassonne
- Water features on the Canal du Midi
- Louis XIV Victory Monument
- List of Word Heritage Sites in France
