= Pierre Campmas =

French engineer

Pierre Campmas, fountaineer of Revel, assisted Pierre-Paul Riquet in his earliest design of the Canal du Midi. He helped Riquet confirm that the valleys of the Montagne Noire could provide sufficient water for the canal and helped him build model canal workings at Riquet's estate, Bonrepos.
