= Pont Marengo =

Bridge in France

Coordinates: 43°13′3″N 2°21′7″E

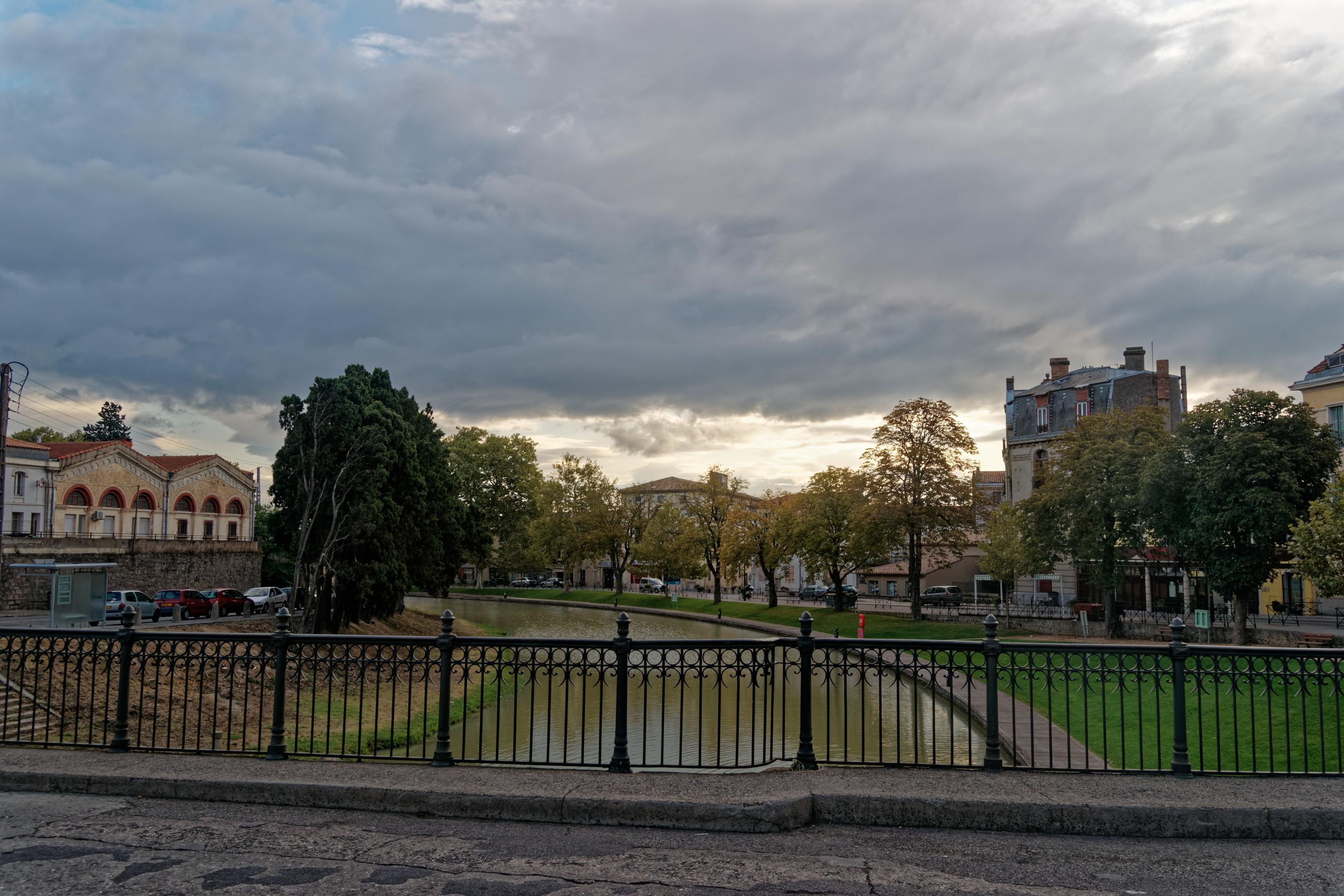
View from the Pont Marengo

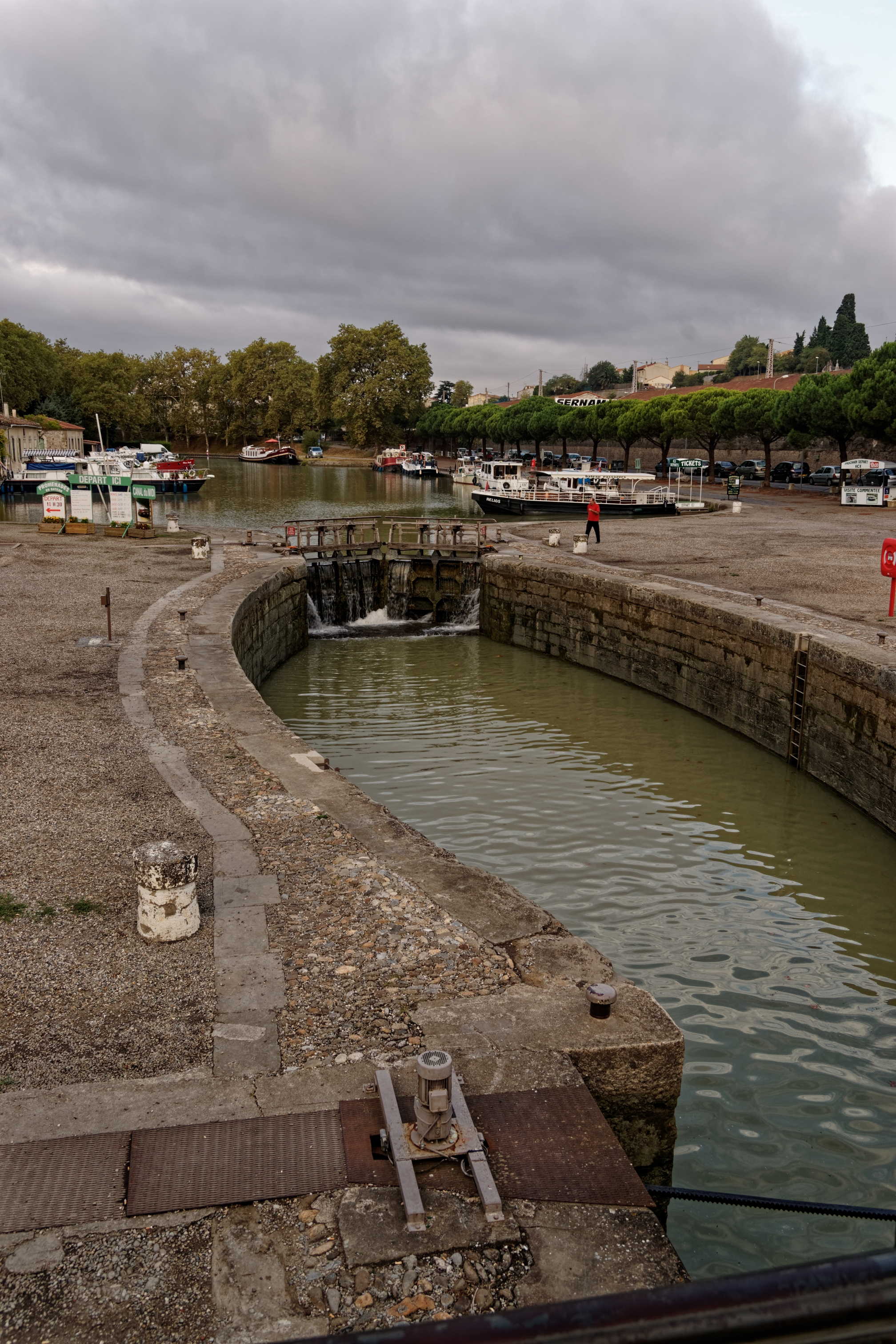
The canal lock at Port Marengo

The Pont Marengo (Marengo bridge) crosses the Canal du Midi and links Carcassonne to the local railway station.

The busy canal lock at Port Marengo is a tourist attraction as the canal boats work their way along the canal. The bridge is named after the Battle of Marengo at which Napoleon defeated the Austrians in 1800, and a plaque on the bridge dates the construction to that year (or year 8, as it is given in the French Republican calendar).

A little way down from the bridge the railway line crosses the canal and here there is a small plaque and garden commemorating the maquisards who were executed here by the Nazis.

== See also ==
- Locks on the Canal du Midi
