= Water features on the Canal du Midi =

The balancing of incoming and outgoing water allows the Canal du Midi to operate as it does. Each time a lock operates, large quantities of water are either required to fill it or dump from it into the lower level pound. There must be a constant source of water in order to fill and the excess water dumped must have a place to exit the canal without it overflowing. Being able to provide this water source was one of the most important problems to be solved by Pierre Paul Riquet, its creator.

In the canal's original configuration of 1687, water was provided by the Rigole de la plaine from the River Sor and from the Bassin de Saint-Ferréol. The Bassin de Lampy was added later. Since the drought of 1989–1990, water can also be made available from the Lac de Montbel.

Water leaving the canal between locks, will exit through either a weir (French: déversoir) or a siphon (French: Épanchoir). Leaving through the weir, the water simply flows over the side of the canal via a stone or concrete ledge. If the water reaches a specific level, it may be siphoned off via a stone siphon.

Water Features on the Canal du Midi Code: WS=Water Source, W=Weir S=Siphon
Code	PK^{[A]}	Name	Lat/Lon	Comment
WS	52.0	Rigole de la plaine	43.35041°N 1.82377°E	Water from the Bassin de Saint-Ferréol reaches the canal at the Bassin de Naurouze
S	68.5	Épanchoir du Vivier	43.29763°N 1.99319°E	Near the triple locks of Vivier Lock
W	75.8	Déversoir de Villepinte	43.27596°N 2.07812°E	
S	77.5	Épanchoir de Villepinte	43.27432°N 2.09388°E	
S	92.9	Épanchoir de Villeséque		
S	101.8	Épanchoir de Foucaud	43.2274°N 2.3201°E	Originally, the canal went around Carcassonne at this point. There is a botanical garden of the same name, Épanchoir de Foucaud.
W	106.6	Déversoir de St-Jean	43.22413°N 2.36674°E	
WS	109.0	Rigole d'Alimentation du Fresquel		A stream provides water from Barrage de la Chaux
S	109.5	Épanchoir de Charques	43.24333°N 2.38409°E	
W	115.6	Déversion de la Raye	43.21594°N 2.42553°E	
WS	116.5	l'Orbiel		Not sure exactly what this is. The reference shows the stream l'Orbiel splitting north of the canal. One side of the stream joins the canal and the other goes under the canal via the Orbiel Aqueduct. So, it could either be a source of water or a release path. The reference calls it the French: canal d'alimentation d'Orbiel and the canal vieux.
S	119.0	Épanchoir de Ste-Julia	43.20023°N 2.45944°E	
W	125.1	Déversoir de Marseillette	43.20155°N 2.52342°E	
S	140.5	Épanchoir d'Argentdouble	43.25030°N 2.66719°E	
S	167.7	Épanchoir des Patiasses	43.27973°N 2.91489°E	

== See also ==
- Aqueducts on the Canal du Midi
- Canal du Midi
- Locks on the Canal du Midi

== Notes ==
^{A} Distance in km from the beginning of the canal in Toulouse.
