= Rigole de la montagne =

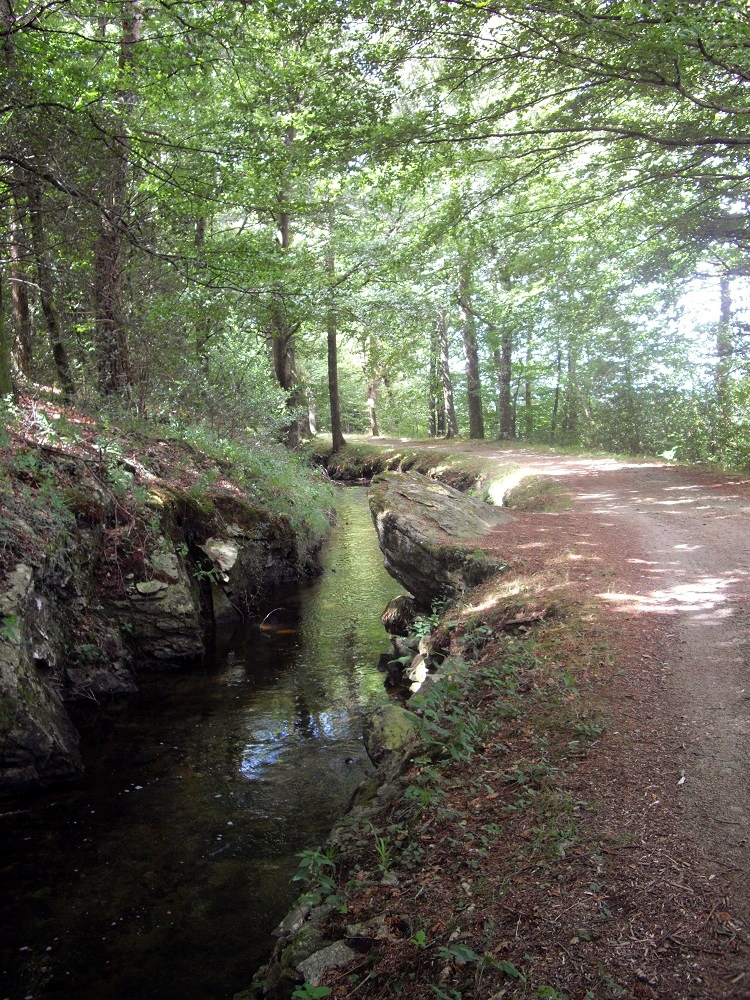
Rigole de la montagne

The rigole de la montagne (English: trickle of the mountain) was an important facet of the Canal du Midi, engineered by Pierre-Paul Riquet in southern France. The canal itself was built during 1666–1681. A critical aspect of the Canal du Midi was the supply of sufficient water to feed the canal. Each boat traversing its length would require a large quantity of water in the locks in order to climb or descend.

The original plan was to take water from the Sor River at Revel via the rigole de la plaine and transport it to the Bassin de Naurouze to provide a source of water for the canal. To placate mill owners fearful that they would lose too much water from the Sor, the rigole de la montagne would supplement the Sor upstream from the rigole de la plaine at Conquet. It was to collect water from the Alzau stream, as well as others, and divert them to the River Sor at Conquet.

In 1664, Louis Nicolas de Clerville had the idea for a single large dam of the Laudot valley near Saint Ferreol, which became the Bassin de Saint-Ferréol. He also had the idea of digging a tunnel through the Cammazes ridge to connect the rigole de la montagne to the reservoir in the valley without utilizing the Sor river at all. In 1686, the engineer, Marshal Sebastien Vauban, extended the rigole de la montagne 7.2 kilometres (4.5 mi) from Conquet to connect it to the Bassin de St. Ferréol. The path included a 121-metre (132 yd) long, 2.7-metre (9 ft) diameter tunnel at the village of Les Cammazes.

To reduce leakage in some locations, the trench is lined with bricks. Beautiful walking paths accompany the waters flow.

The following is translated from the French Wikipedia article of this same name:

The channel begins at the intake of the Alzau (altitude 645 metres (2,116 ft)) to Arfons in the Black Mountains and empties into the rigole de la plaine, which supplies water to the Canal du Midi. The trench collects waters from the southern slope of the Black Mountains. It collects water from different streams, especially Bernassonne, the Alzau, the Lampy, and Rieutord, and the dammed Galaube. It runs south of the reservoir Cammazes (which did not exist at the time of construction of the canal).

A little further south of the village Les Cammazes, the channel changes its slope and passes to the north side. To cross the mountain, it goes through a tunnel masonry arch, the arch of Vauban, also called Breakthrough Cammazes. The tunnel is 122 metres (400 ft) long and 3 metres (9.8 ft) wide. The bridge was designed by the architect Vauban, after the death of Riquet. The front of the exit tunnel was rebuilt in the 18th century. Before the digging of the tunnel, the Rigole Mountain fed the Sor River in Conquet at an altitude of 620 metres (2,030 ft). The Sor was captured by the trickle of the plain near Sorèze at the Bridge Crouzet (altitude 245 metres (804 ft)). Leaving the Breakthrough Cammazes, the channel flows into the stream of Laudot, which itself feeds the reservoir Bassin de Saint-Ferréol.

== Gallery ==
- La voute Vauban les Cammazes by CHMProd
- Rigole et chemin.
- Voûte de VAUBAN.
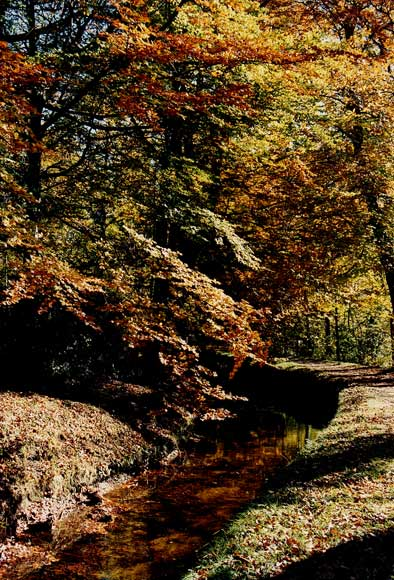
Fall picture.
