= Seuil de Naurouze =

Watershed point in southern France

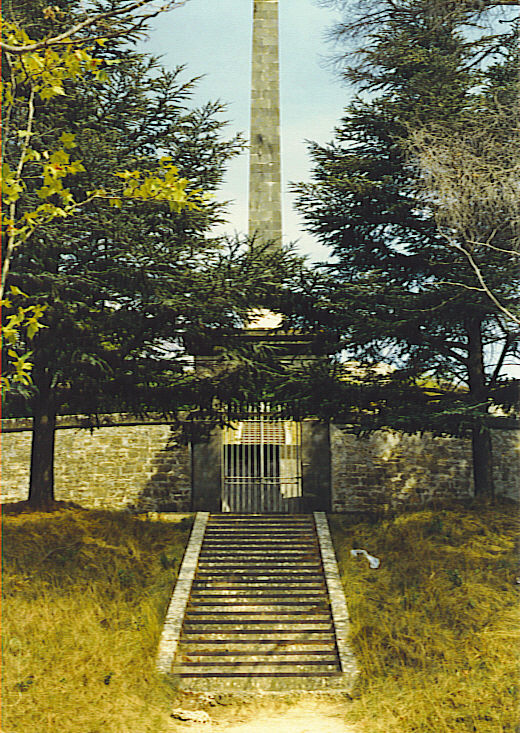
Riquet Monument 43.35235°N 1.82699°E

The Seuil de Naurouze, or Col de Naurouze, is the highest point (190 m above sea level) of the Canal du Midi in southern France. It is the watershed point identified by Pierre-Paul Riquet when he designed and built the canal. Water falling on the western side of this point flows to the Atlantic Ocean and on the eastern side to the Mediterranean Sea. It is on the border of the department of Haute-Garonne and the department of the Aude.

In 1827, the heirs of Riquet built the Riquet Obelisk. The obelisk has a dedication: "To Pierre-Paul Riquet, Baron Bonrepos, author of the Two Seas Canal in Languedoc". It is erected near the site of the former octagonal holding tank, called the Bassin de Naurouze created during the building of the Canal du Midi.

The flow of water from the Bassin de St. Ferréol joins the Canal at this point.

The locks closest to the Seuil de Naurouze are the Océan Lock on the Atlantic ocean side and the Mediterranee Lock on the Mediterranean sea side.

The Seuil has been known since Antiquity: Greek geographer Strabo called it the Gaulish isthmus, and the Roman road Via Aquitania, going from Narbonnes to Toulouse, went through the Seuil.

== Gallery ==
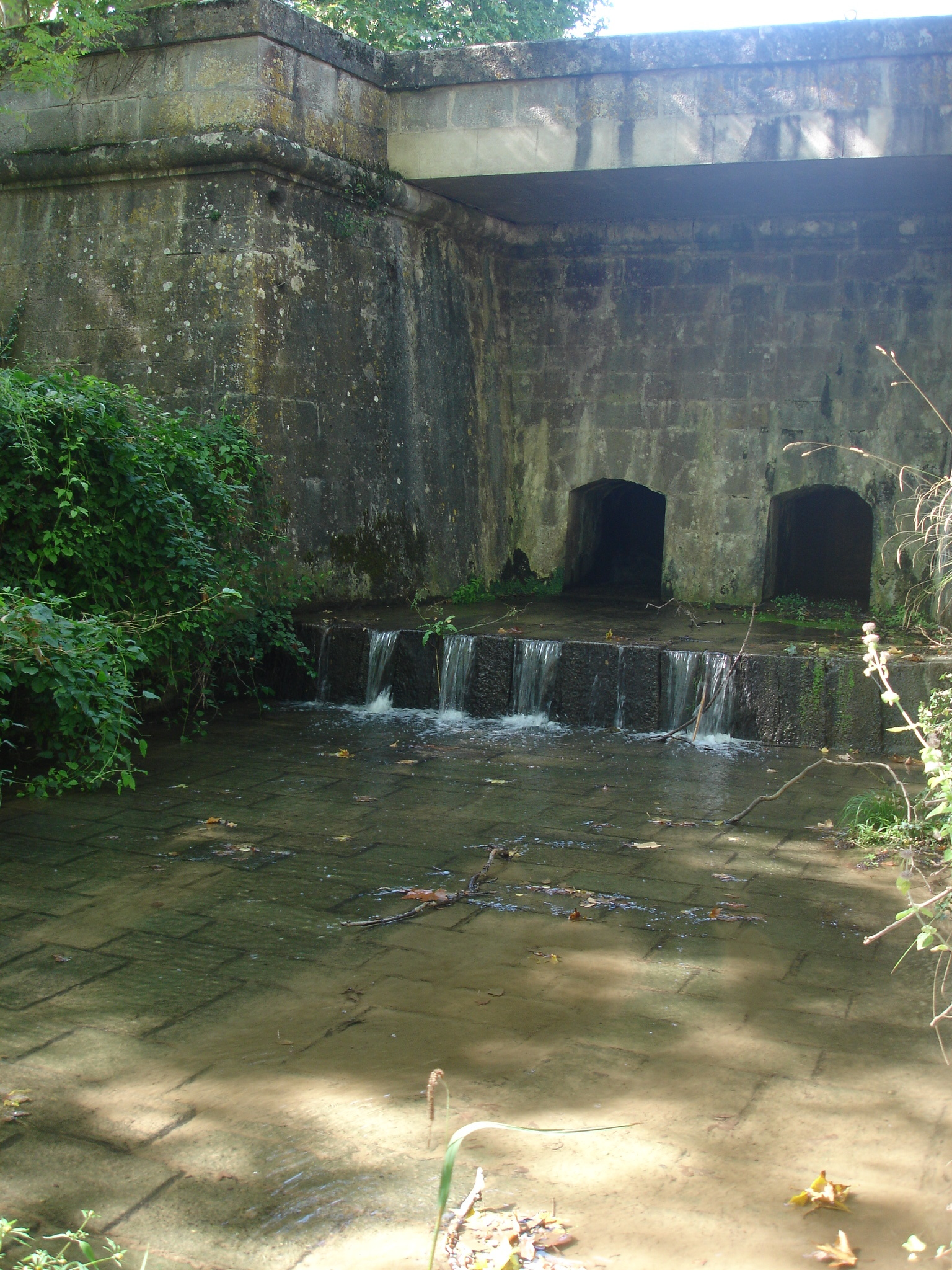
Spillway in Naurouze

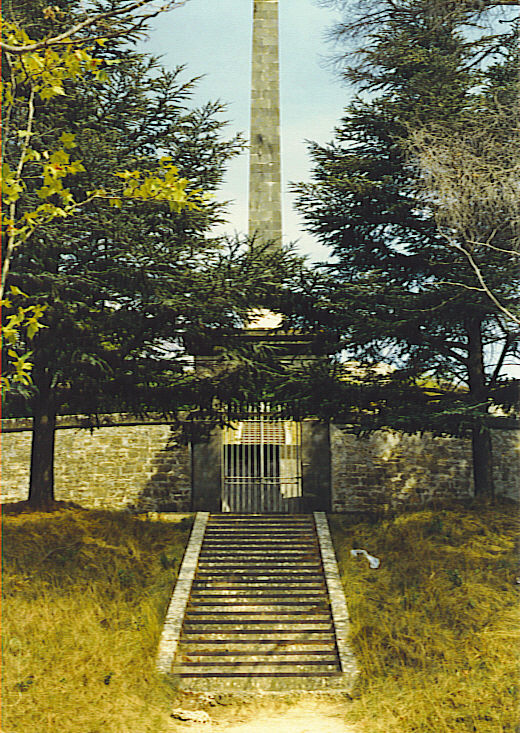
Riquet Obelisk

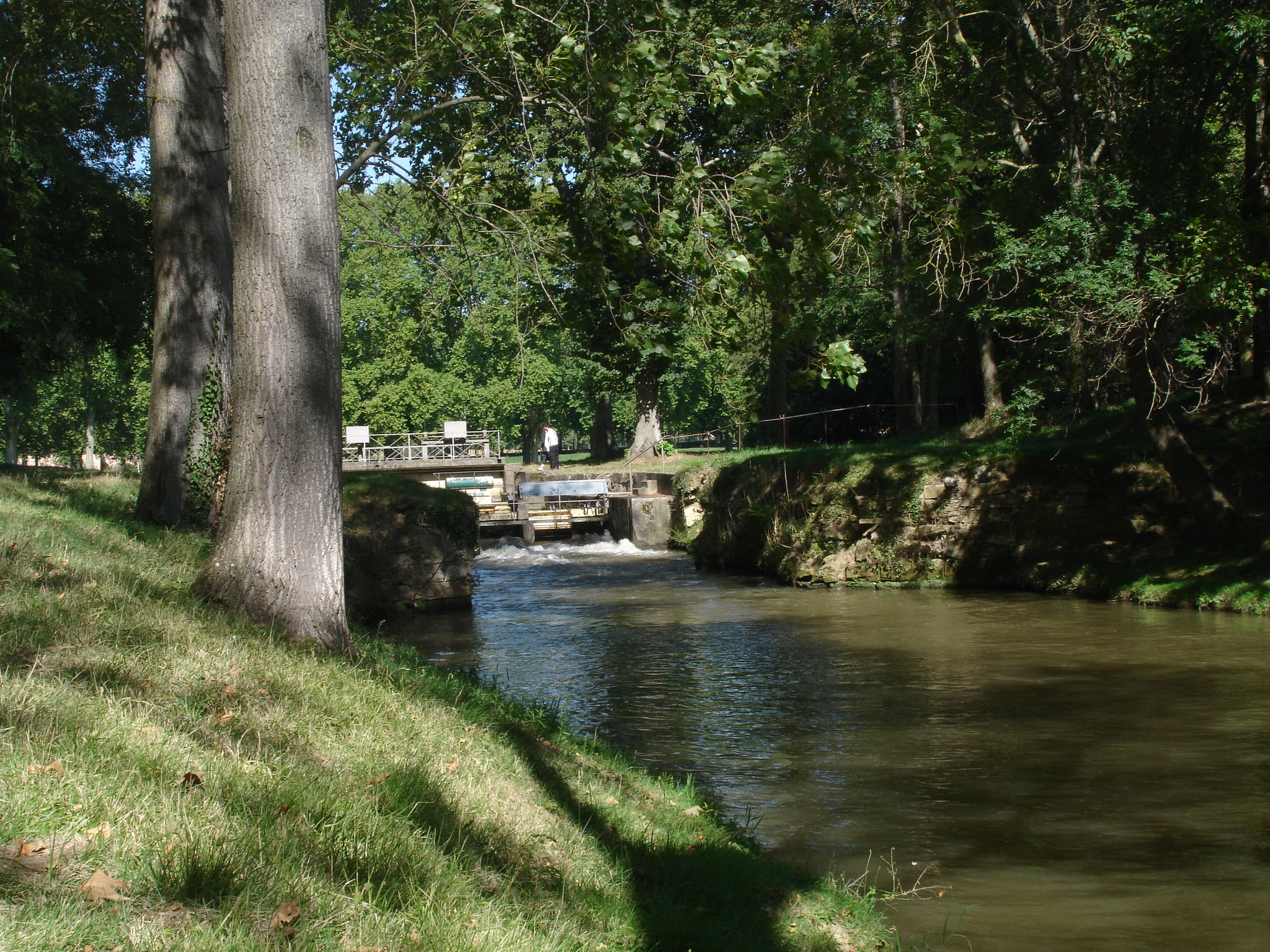
Water joins the Canal from the Bassin de Naurouze

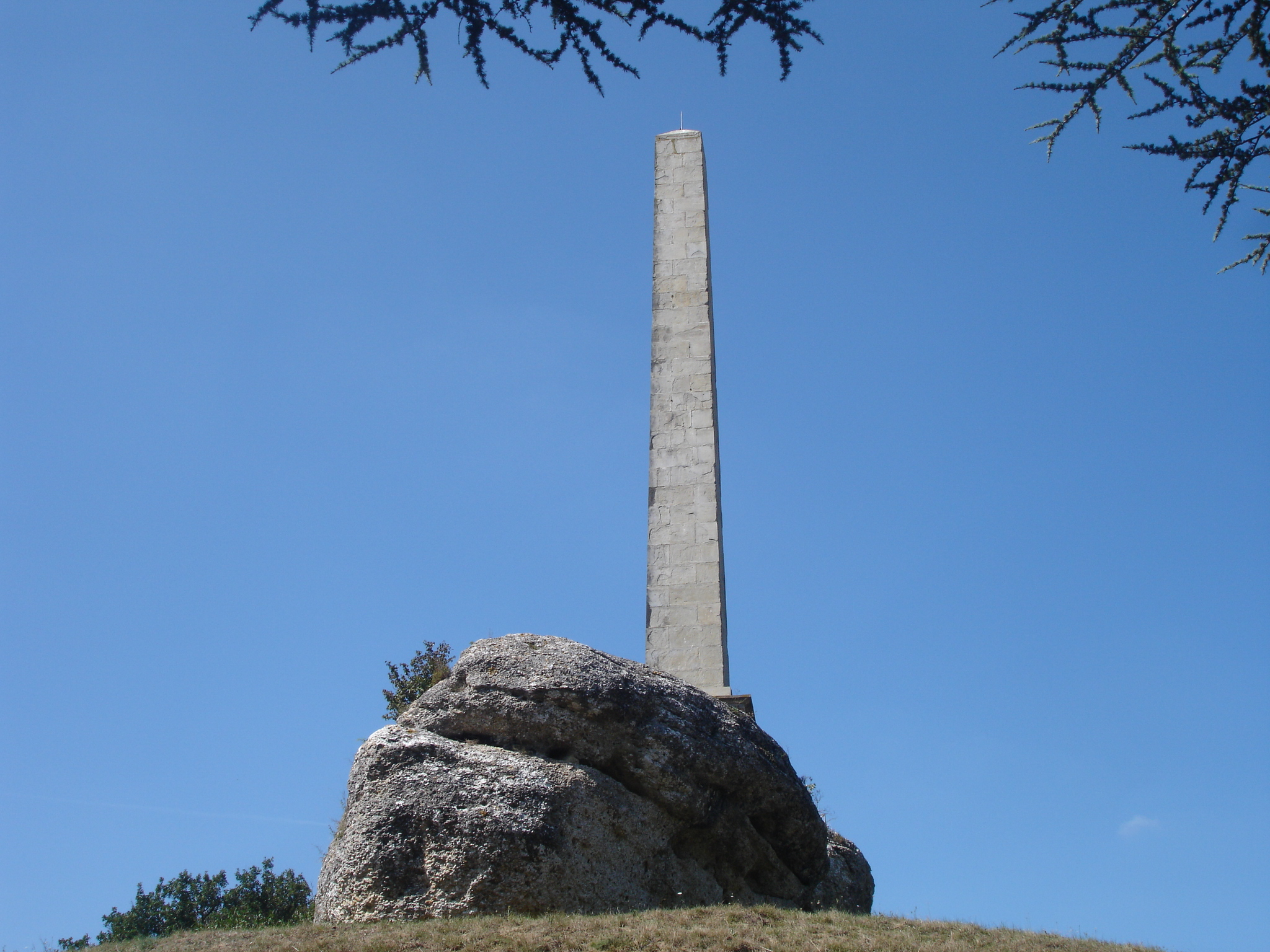
Riquet Obelisk

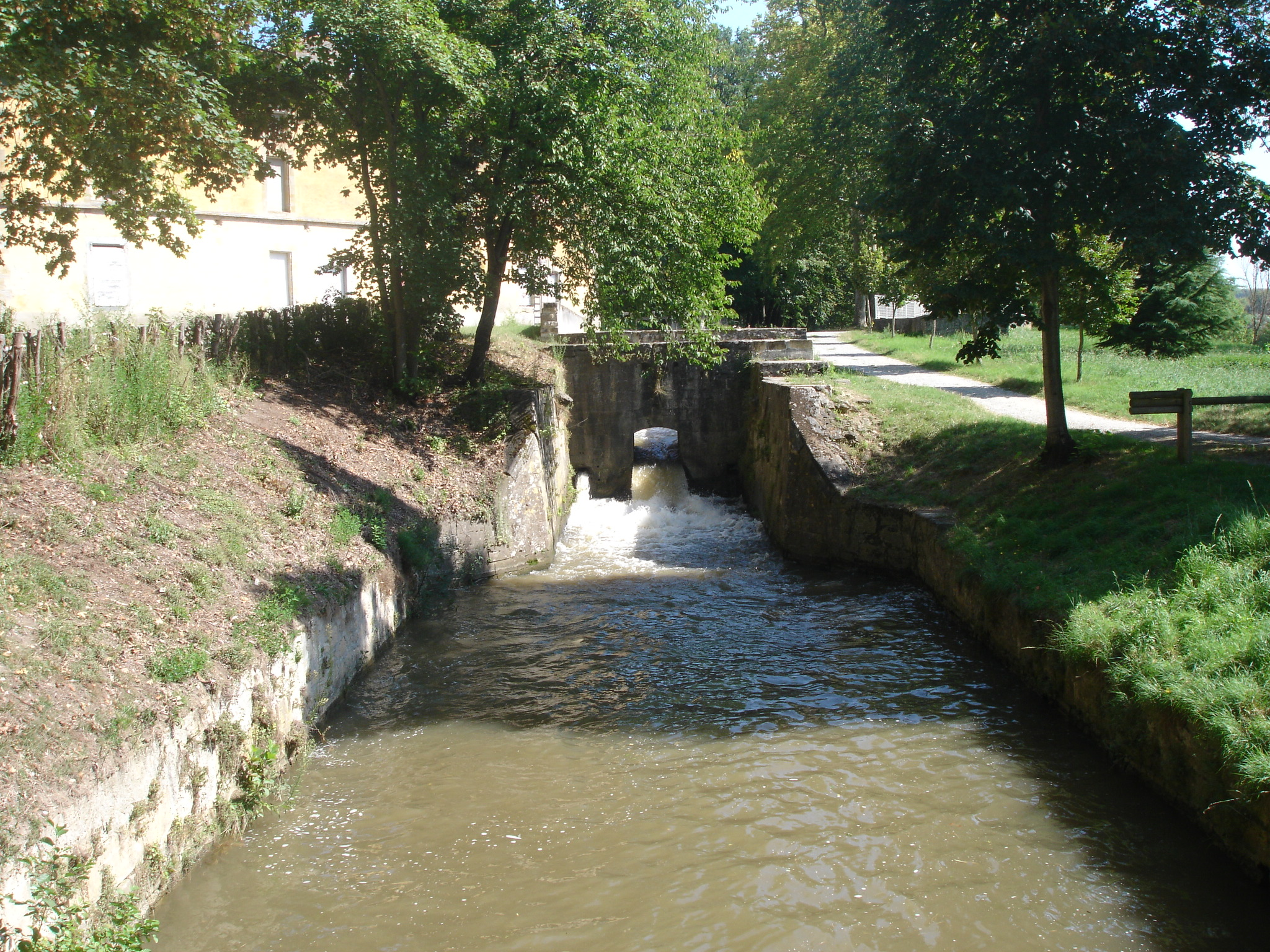
Rigole de la plaine empties into the Bassin de Naurouze

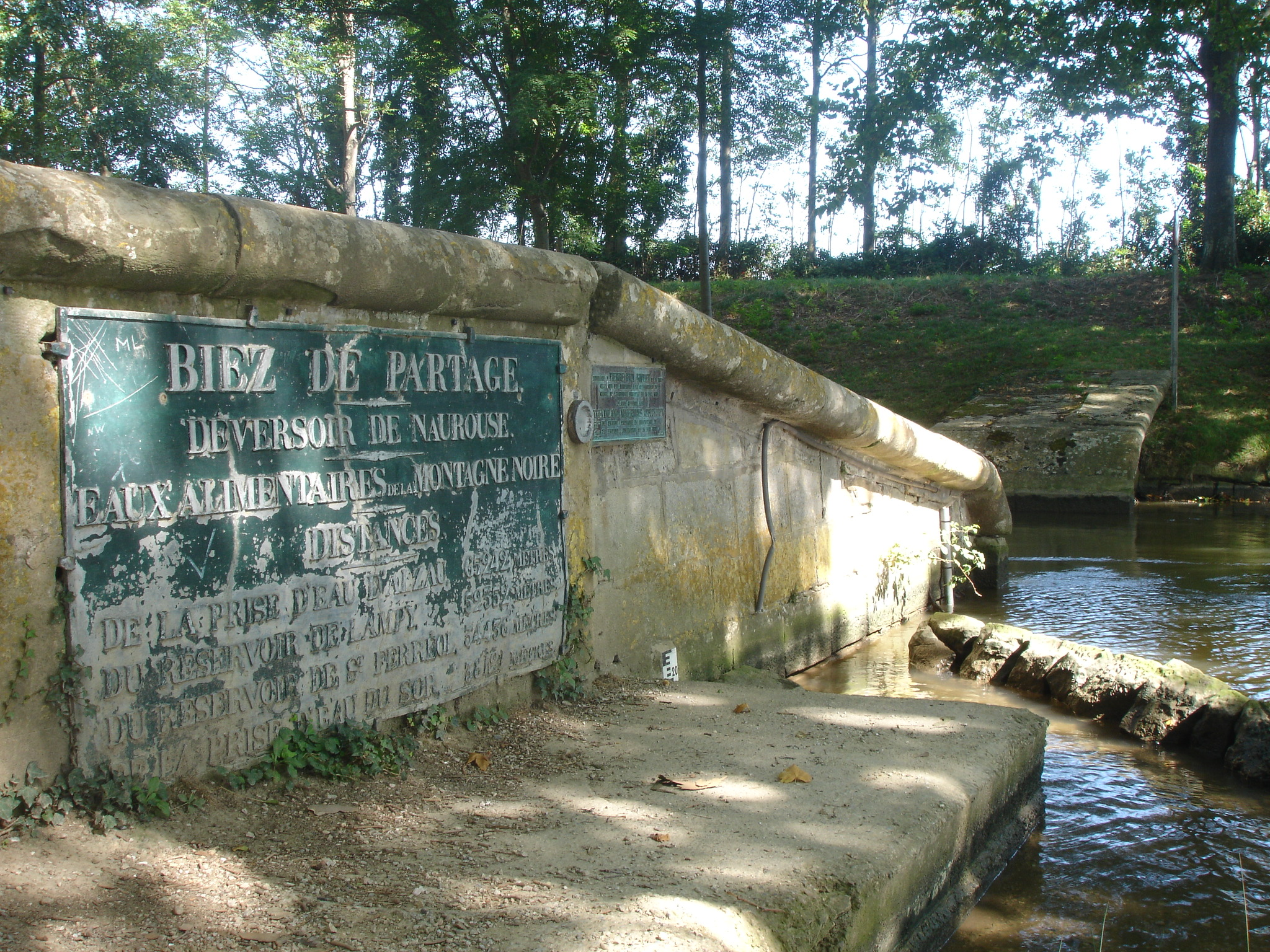
Summit level sign at the watershed point

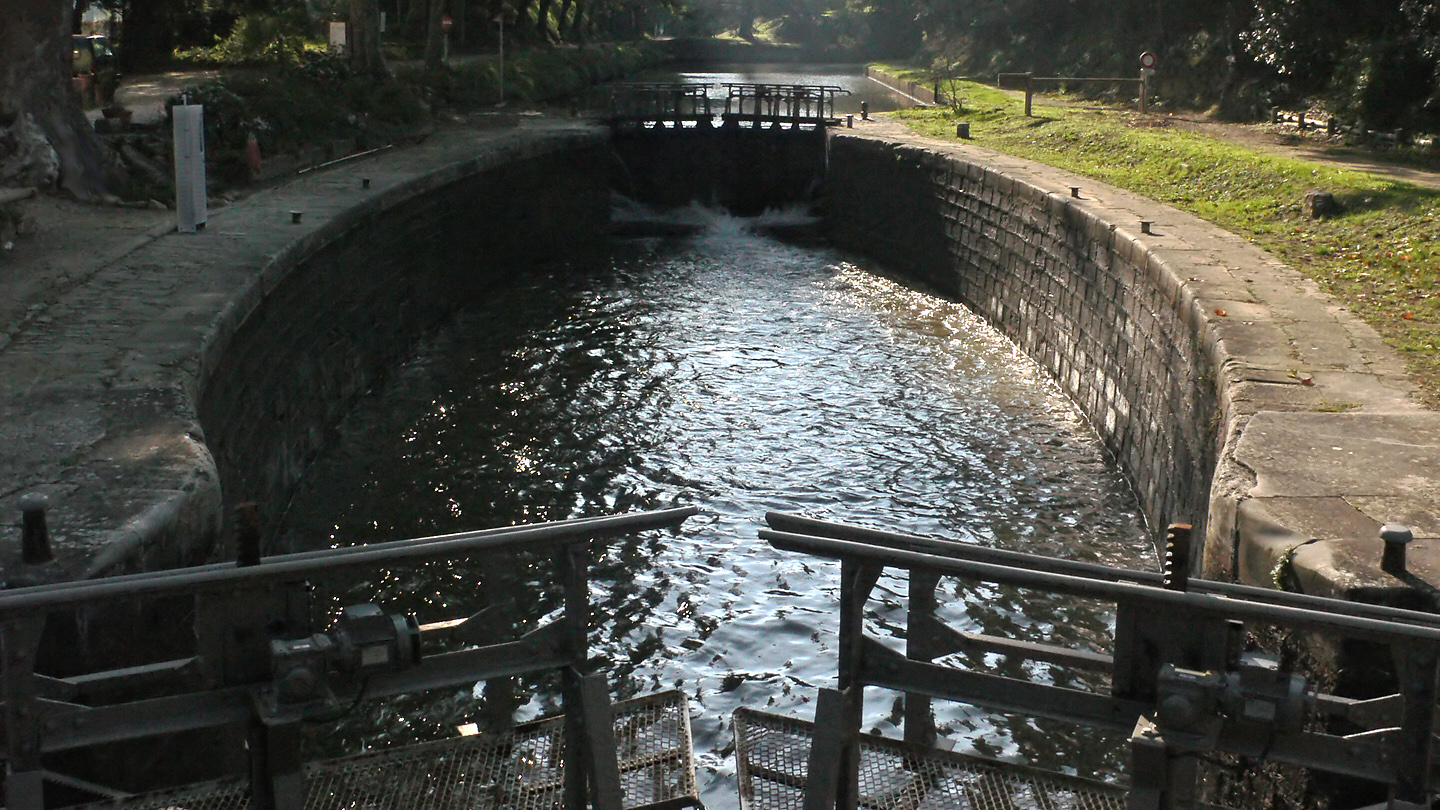
Lock on the Canal du Midi at Naurouze.

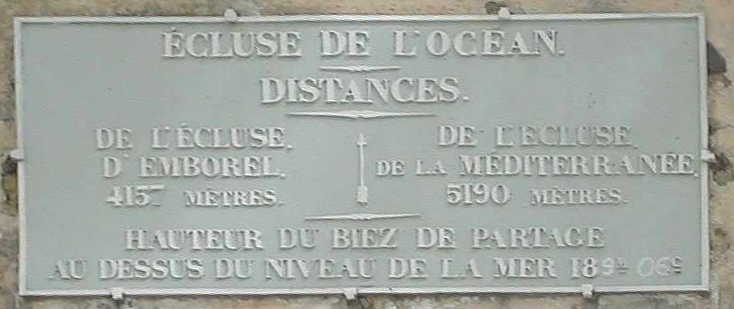
Sign indicating the Océan Lock at the Seuil de Naurouze.

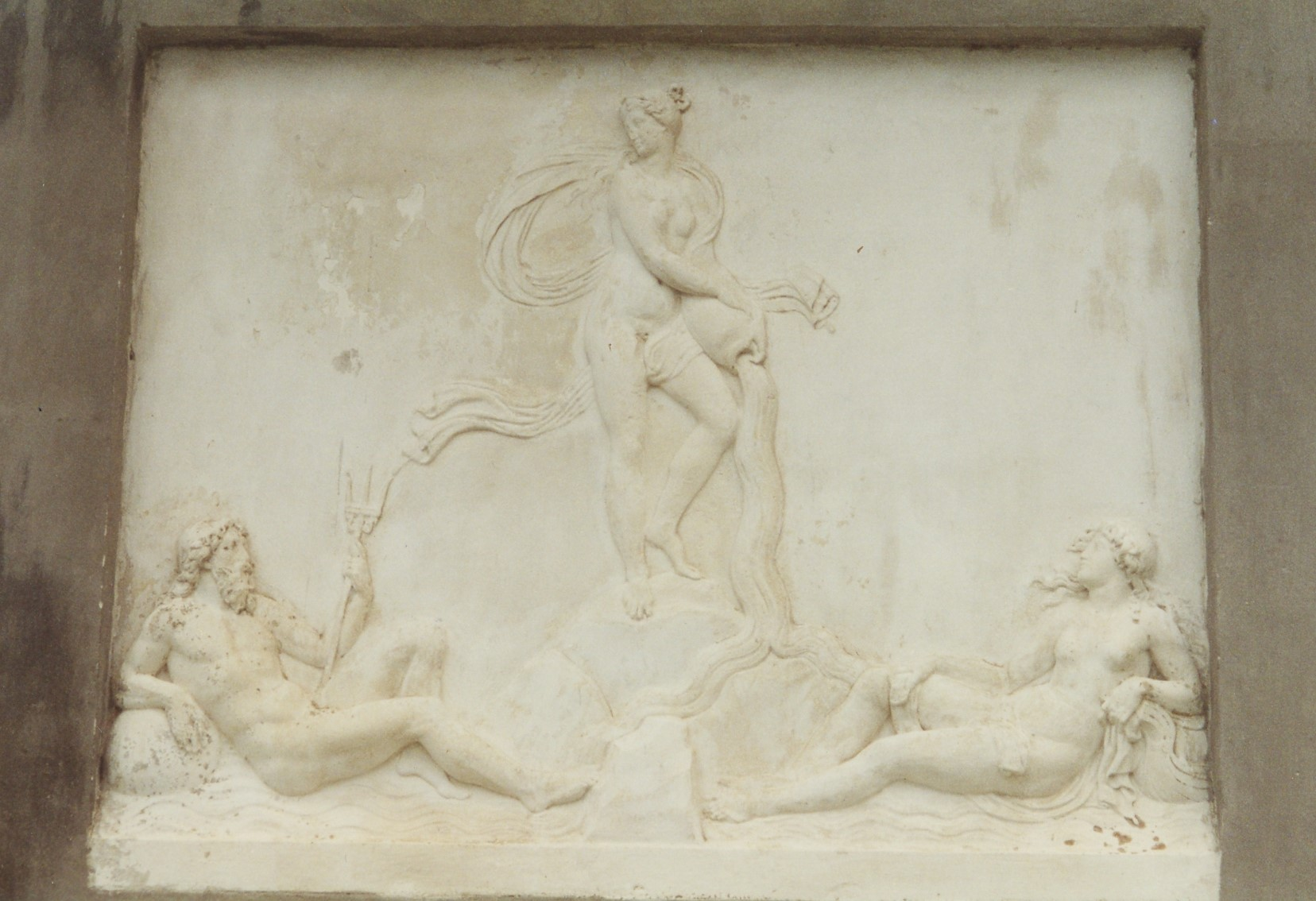
Canal du Midi summit plaque, Seuil de Naurouze, August 2000
