= Louis Nicolas de Clerville =

Louis Nicolas de Clerville (1610 – 15 or 16 October 1677), often referred to as the Chevalier de Clerville, held many military positions during his life in France. In the 1660s, he was the chief engineer for ports and canals under Louis XIV's minister Jean-Baptiste Colbert and was responsible for surveying the coasts of France and the creation of numerous maps. He was also associated with Pierre-Paul Riquet and the building of the Canal du Midi.

Clerville played an important role in François de Vendôme, Duc de Beaufort's 1664 expedition against Algiers and attempt to establish a French stronghold at Djidjelli (or Gigeri, present-day Jijel).

During his association with the canal, Clerville worked for Jean-Baptiste Colbert, minister of finance under Louis XIV. He served as Colbert's commissaire general des fortifications building ports, dry docks and fortresses. Clerville verified Riquet's proposal for the canal and was Colbert's eyes and ears keeping track of Riquet's efforts.

Clerville originated the ideas for the building a single large dam of the Laudot valley near Saint-Ferréol (a hamlet of Revel). When this was accomplished, it became the Bassin de St. Ferréol. He also had the idea for digging the tunnel through the Cammazes ridge to connect the rigole de la montagne to the Bassin de St. Ferréol.

Clerville lost his standing with King Louis in 1673 and died in 1677.
