= Lampy =

Lampy may refer to:

- Bassin de Lampy, France, a reservoir
- nickname of Allan Lamport (1903–1999), Canadian politician, mayor of Toronto, Ontario
- A character in the film The Brave Little Toaster
- A lighting technician
- A light board operator

== See also ==
- The Lampies, an English children's animated television series
