= Océan Lock =

Lock on the Canal du Midi, France

Coordinates: 43°21′19″N 1°49′5″E

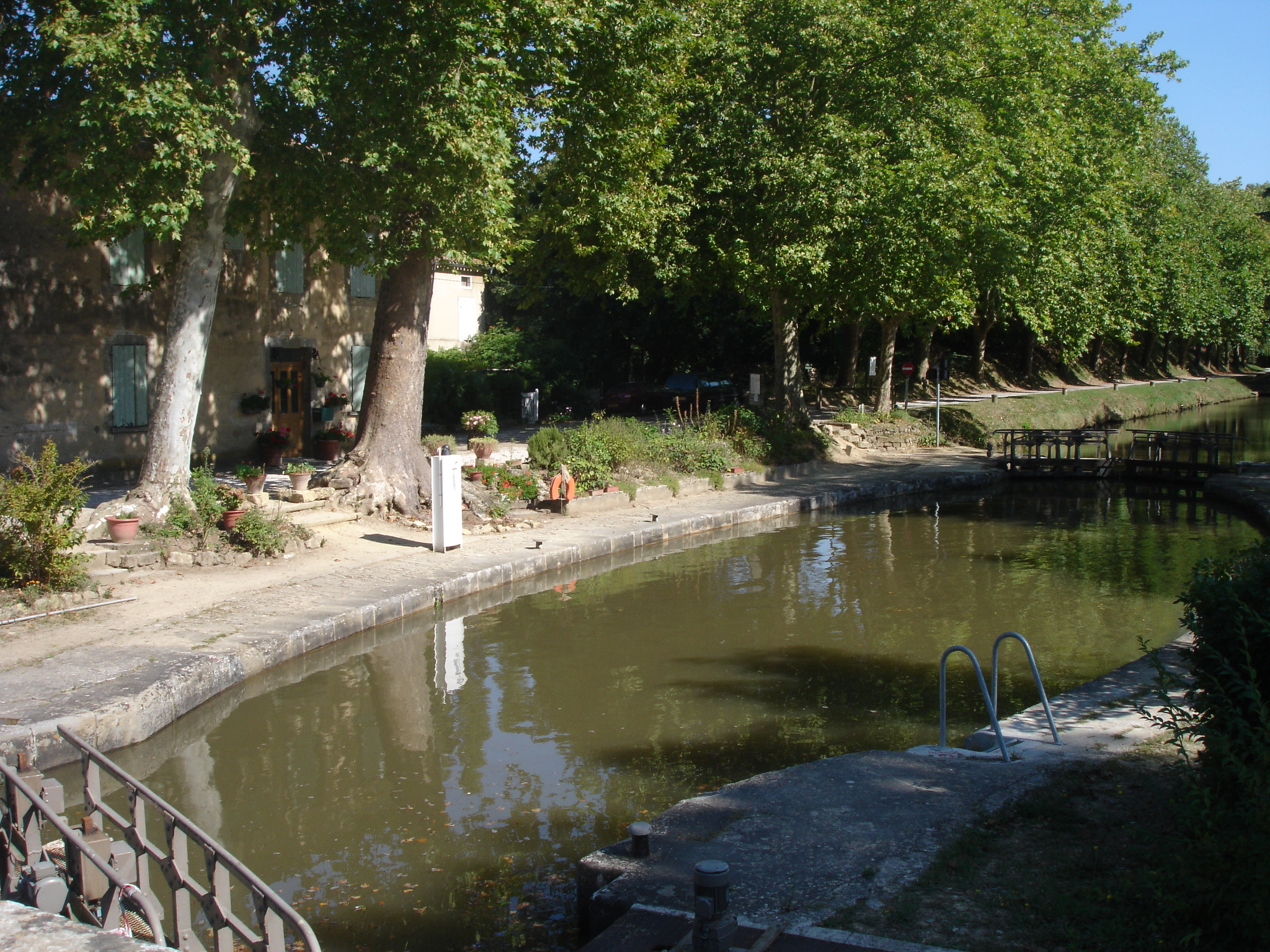

Océan Lock is a single chamber lock on the Canal du Midi. The adjacent locks are Mediterranee Lock 5190 metres to the east and Emborrel Lock 4157 metres to the west. Ocean Lock marks the start of the summit section of the canal when travelling west to east.

It is located in the commune of Montferrand, Aude.

== See also ==
- Locks on the Canal du Midi
- Seuil de Naurouze
