= Bassin de Saint-Ferréol =

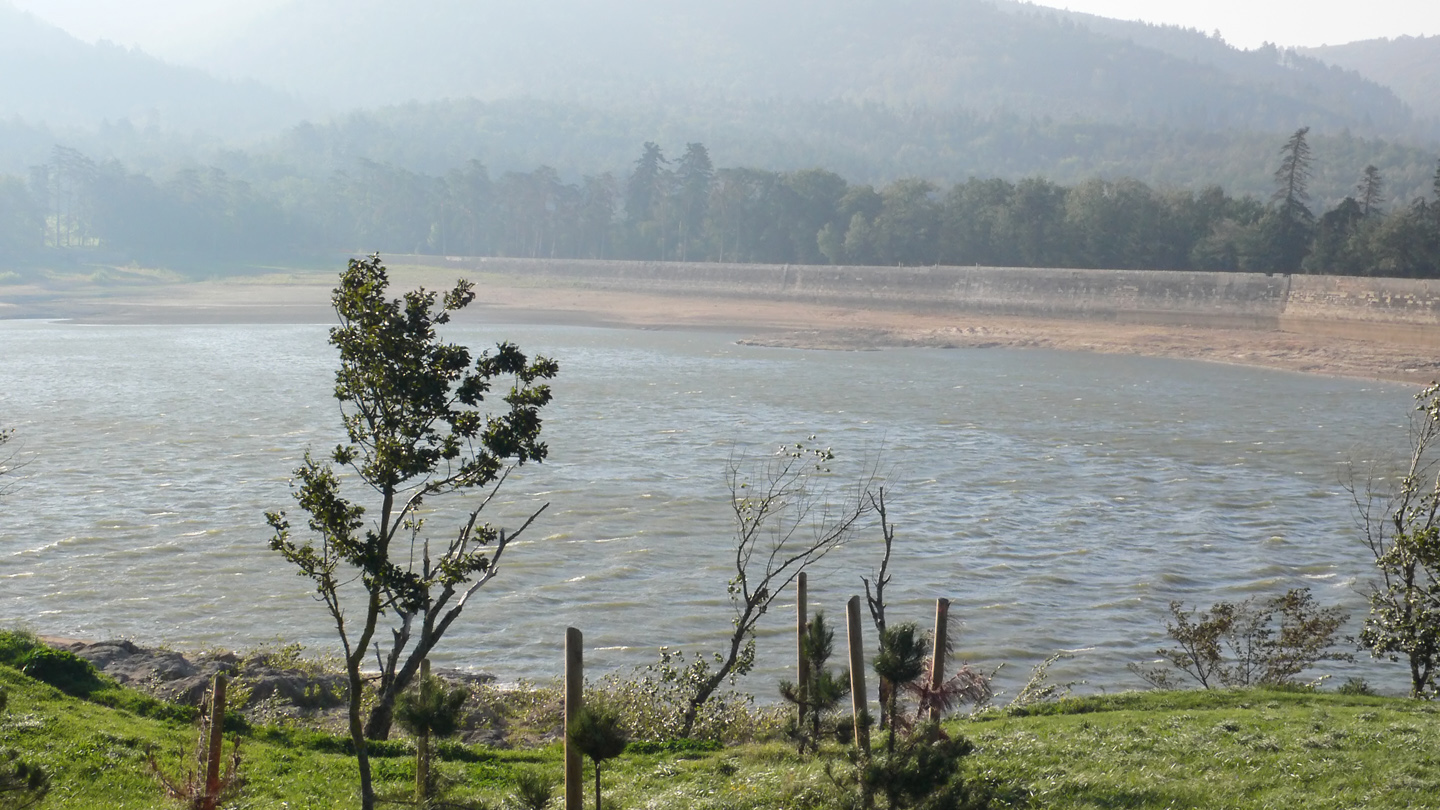

- Location within France
- Location: Aude, Haute-Garonne, Tarn
- Coordinates: 43°26′15″N 02°01′18″E
- Type: reservoir
- Primary inflows: Laudot
- Basin countries: France
- Surface area: 0.67 km^{2} (170 acres)
- Max. depth: 36 m (118 ft)
- Water volume: 6,300,000 m^{3} (220,000,000 cu ft)

The Bassin de Saint-Ferréol (Languedocien: Lac de Sant Ferriòl) was created as the result of a large earth dam across the mouth of the valley of Laudot stream at St. Ferréol in the Montagne Noire. It was originally proposed by Chevalier de Clerville and accepted by Pierre Paul Riquet as an integral part of the Canal du Midi. Riquet needed to provide a sufficient water reservoir to allow the locks to function year round, even in the dry summer season. The dam was begun on 15 April 1667 and was completed in four years. It was the first dam built specifically to supply water to a navigable canal and was by far the greatest single work of civil engineering undertaken during the building of the Canal du Midi.

The dam has a crest length of 780 m (2,560 ft), a maximum height of 32 m (105 ft), and a base thickness of more than 140 m (450 ft). Water may be drawn from the reservoir via a stone vaulted tunnel that penetrates the base of the dam. Silt can be removed from the floor of the reservoir through the tunnel. When filled to capacity, the reservoir contains some 680,000 cubic metres (180×10^{6} US gal) of water.

Originally, the basin was to be fed by only the River Laudot. When this was deemed to be insufficient, other streams fed into what Riquet called the "rigole de la montagne". Rigole is a diversionary channel. This stream would have included contributions from the River Alzau, River Vernassone, River Lampillon, River Lampy, and River Rieutort. The stream passed through the 121 metres (132 yd) long, 2.7 metres (9 ft) diameter Cammazes Tunnel on its way to the basin. The tunnel was built by the military engineer Marshall Sebastien Vauban in 1686–87.

The entrance of the Laudot into the basin is split so that one portion goes into the basin and the other portion diverts around the basin and returns to the Laudot downstream of the dam. The waters released from the dam follow the downstream route of the Laudot until they join with the rigole de la plaine at Les Thoumazes. The waters continue to the Bassin de Naurouze before entering the canal itself.

Though Riquet took credit for the water supply provided by the basin, much of the knowledge required was provided by Pierre Campmas, a fontainier, and François Andréossy, an hydraulics engineer.

The lake lies in the three communes of Vaudreuille (Haute-Garonne), Les Brunels (Aude) and Sorèze (Tarn).

== Gallery ==
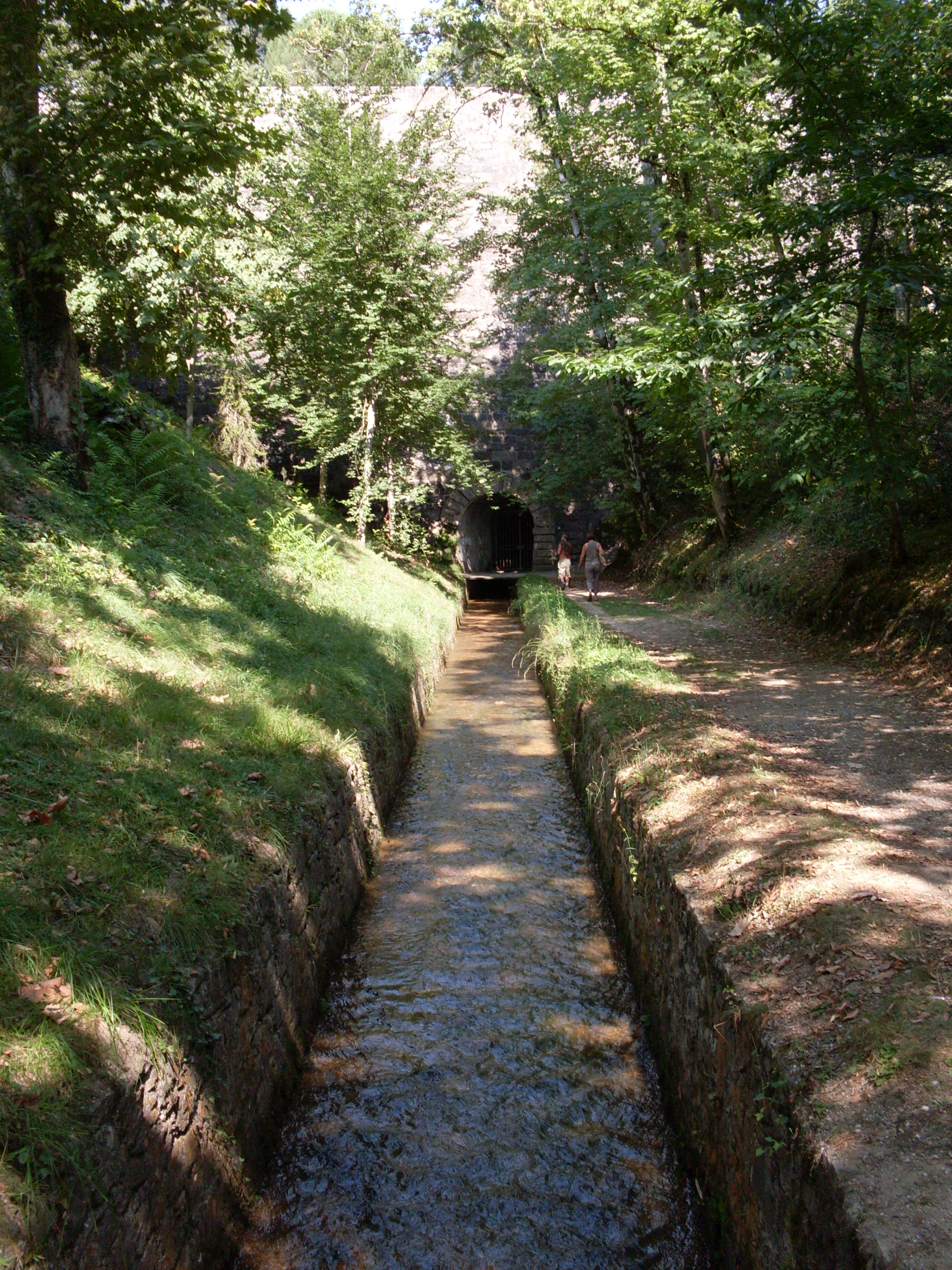
Release of dam water from Lake St. Ferréol.

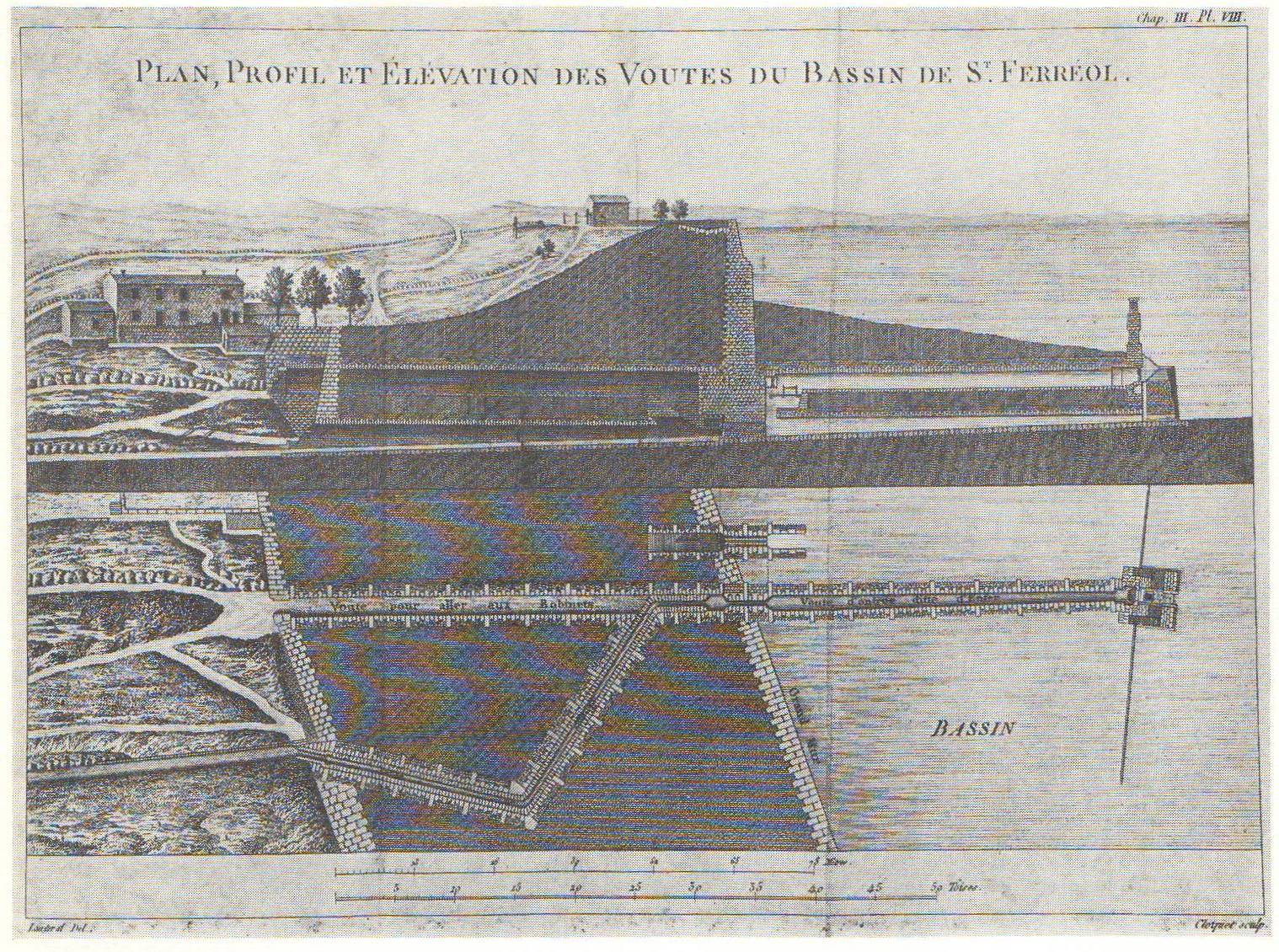
St. Ferréol Dam cross section.
