= Négra Lock =

Lock on the Canal du Midi, France

Négra
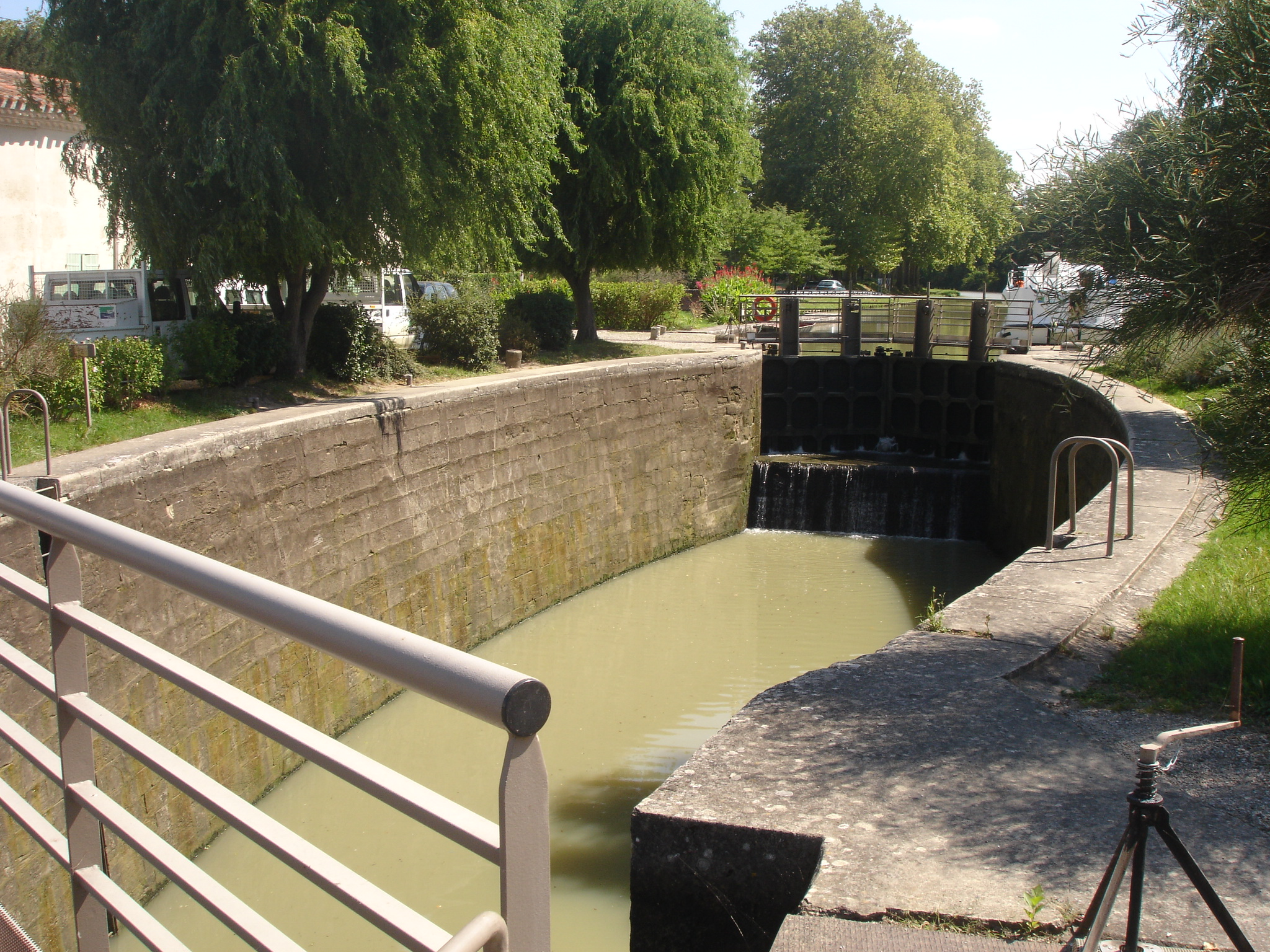
- Interactive map of Négra
- 43°25′7″N 1°38′28″E
- Waterway: Canal du Midi
- Country: France
- Maintained by: Voies navigables de France
- Operation: Hydraulic
- First built: c1670
- Above sea level: 166m
- Distance to Toulouse: 33.3km

Négra Lock (French: écluse de Négra) is a single chamber lock on the Canal du Midi near the village of Villefranche-de-Lauragais in Languedoc, France. There is a small chapel at the lock and also a small red-brick aqueduct which carries the canal over the Thésauque, a tributary of the Hers.

Négra Lock is at an altitude of 166m and is ascending when travelling west–east. The adjacent locks are Laval Lock to the east and Sanglier Lock to the west.

== See also ==
- Locks on the Canal du Midi
