= Homps, Aude =

Commune in Occitanie, France

Homps
- Commune
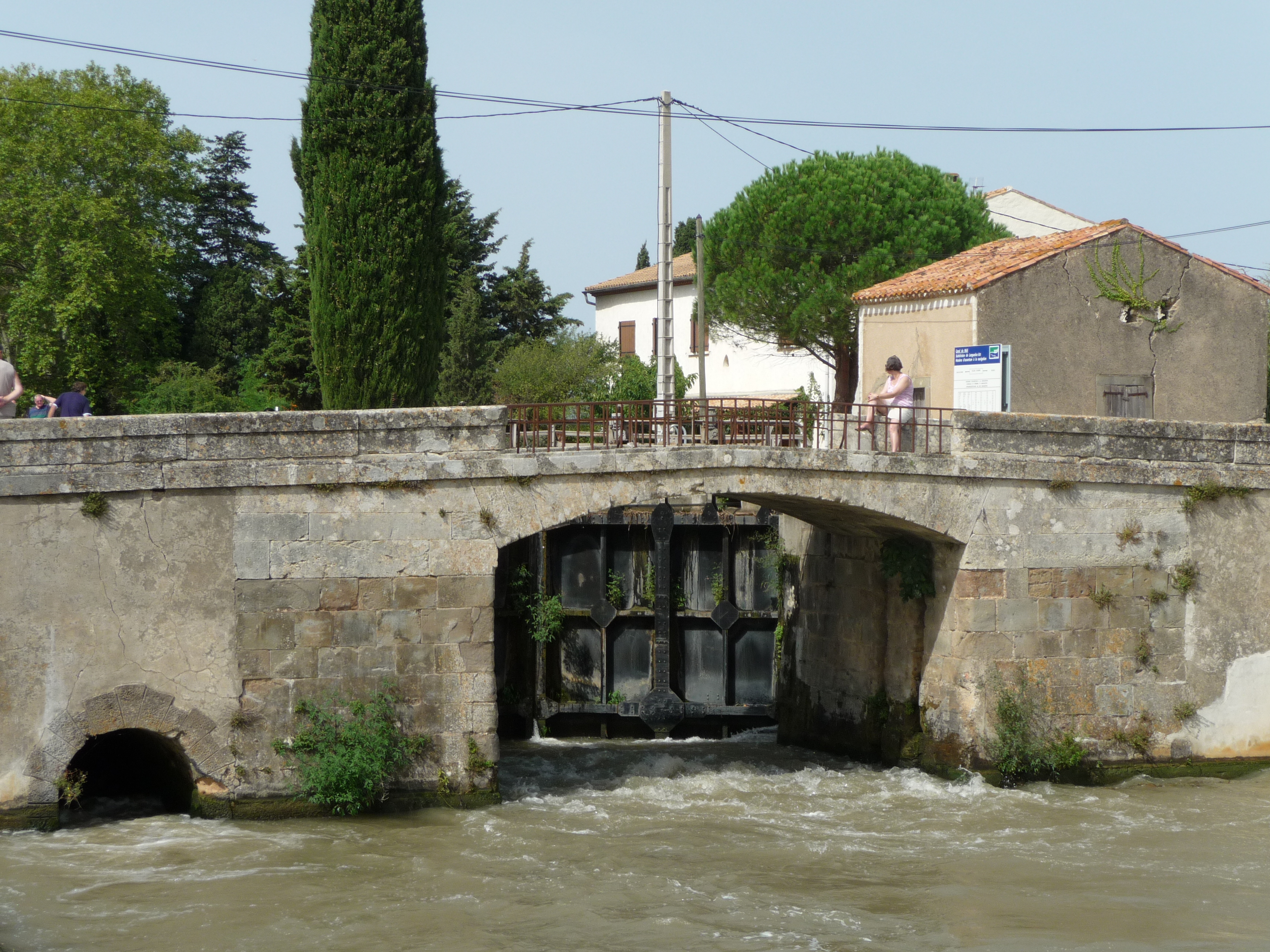
- Lock on the Canal du Midi

- Coat of arms
- Location of Homps
- Location within France Location within Occitanie
- Coordinates: 43°16′06″N 2°43′19″E
- Country: France
- Region: Occitania
- Department: Aude
- Arrondissement: Narbonne
- Canton: Le Lézignanais

Government
  - Mayor (2020–2026): Béatrice Bort
- Area^{1}: 3.06 km^{2} (1.18 sq mi)
- Elevation: 48 m (157 ft)
- Highest elevation: 56 m (184 ft)
- Lowest elevation: 29 m (95 ft)
- Population (2023): 609
  - Density: 199/km^{2} (515/sq mi)
- Time zone: UTC+01:00 (CET)
  - Summer (DST): UTC+02:00 (CEST)
- INSEE/Postal code: 11172 /11200
- ^{1} French Land Register data, which excludes lakes, ponds, glaciers > 1 km^{2} (0.386 sq mi or 247 acres) and river estuaries.

Homps (French pronunciation: [ɔ̃ps]; Occitan: Omps) is a commune in the Aude department in southern France.

== Population ==
Historical population
Year	Pop.	±% p.a.
1968	604	—
1975	548	−1.38%
1982	569	+0.54%
1990	611	+0.89%
1999	605	−0.11%
2007	656	+1.02%
2012	627	−0.90%
2017	591	−1.18%
2023	609	+0.50%
Source: INSEE

== See also ==
- Homps Lock
- Communes of the Aude department
