= Homps Lock =

Lock on the Canal du Midi, France

Coordinates: 43.269874°N 2.729844°E

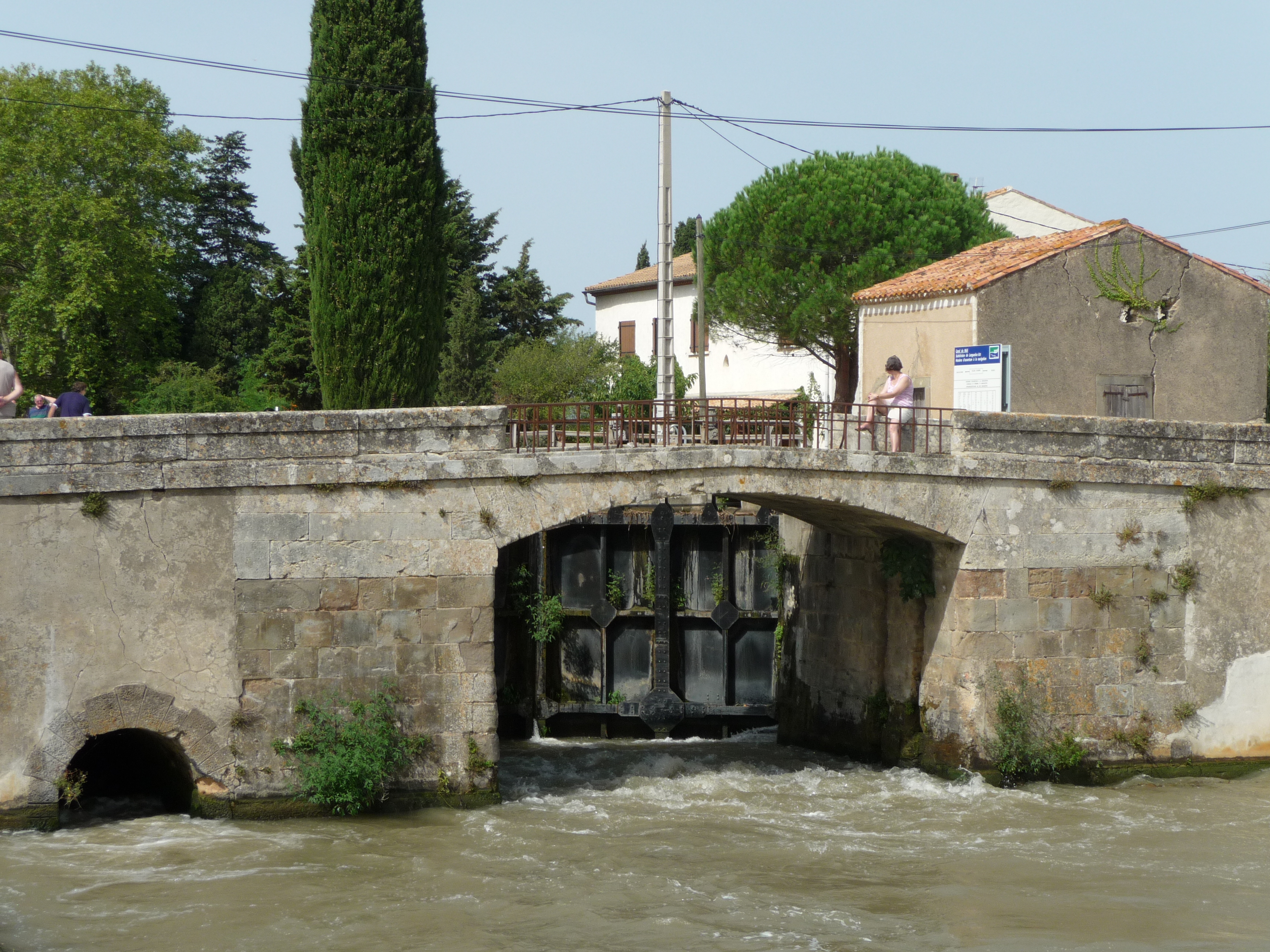

Homps Lock (Occitan: Cadenat de Homps) is a single chamber lock on the Canal du Midi. It lies east of the small town of Homps in the Aude region of Languedoc, France. The adjacent locks are Ognon Lock 689 metres to the east and Jouarres Lock 3688 metres to the west.

== See also ==
- Locks on the Canal du Midi
