= Locks on the Canal du Midi =

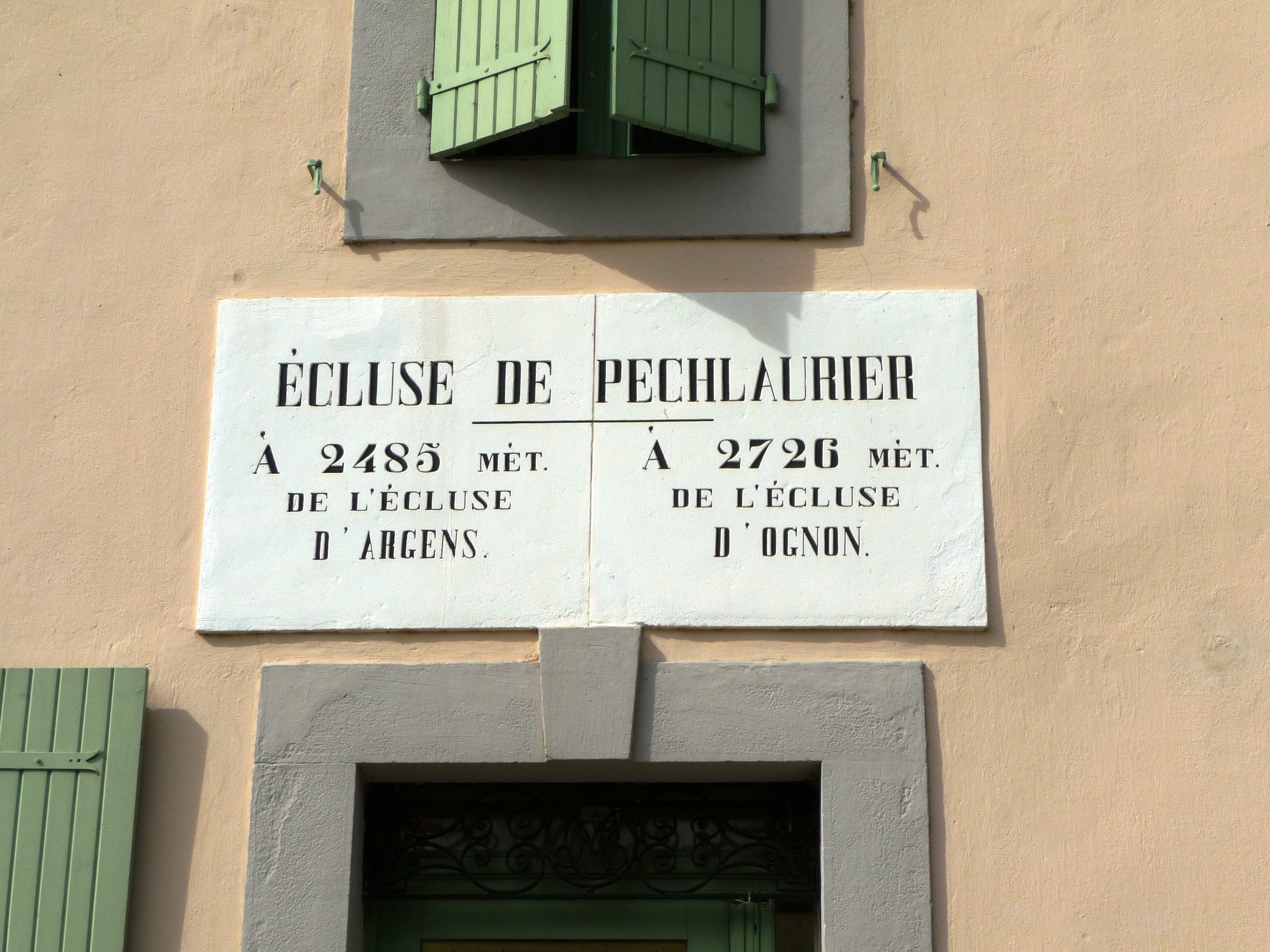
Lock sign on the Canal du Midi

There are 91 working locks on the Canal du Midi along its 240-kilometre (150 mi) course from the Bassin du Thau on the Mediterranean coast to the junction with the Canal lateral a la Garonne in Toulouse. There are a further 13 locks on the 37-kilometre (23 mi) La Nouvelle branch which runs through Narbonne to the Mediterranean at Port-la-Nouvelle. The locks are all under the management of the French navigation authority, Voies navigables de France.

== Construction ==
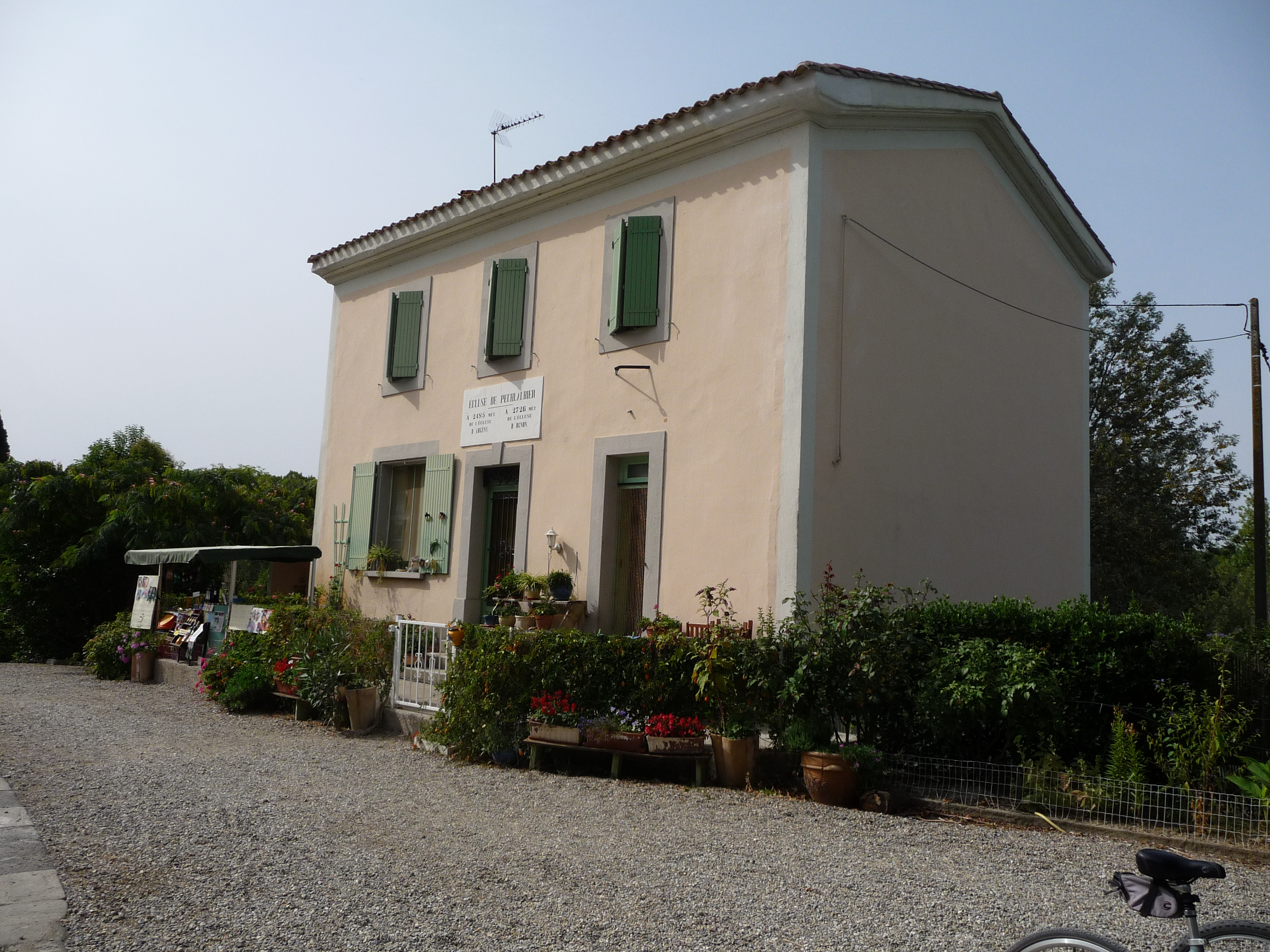
Typical lock keeper's house on the Canal du Midi

The Canal du Midi was built between 1666 and 1681 by Pierre-Paul Riquet to provide an inland water route through Southern France between the Atlantic at Bordeaux and the Mediterranean at Sète via the Garonne. The first design for the locks on the canal was a rectangular shape however due to a collapse of a side-wall early in the building program (exactly which lock is not recorded), Riquet modified his plans and rebuilt both existing and new locks with an ovoid chamber. They were typically 11 m wide at the midpoint and 6 m at the gates with an overall length of 30.5 m. Riquet also restricted the maximum rise to 2.9 m so whereas previously he would have built one deep lock he instead used intermediate gates creating double, triple and sometimes quadruple chambers. During the Canal du Midi modernisation program of the 1970s several of these multiple chambers were converted into single "deep" locks with concrete side walls.

The lock gates were originally made of oak in the traditional mitre pattern with balance beams and each gate had a single large wooden sluice drawn up by a vertical screw. The introduction of electric and hydraulic systems for both the lifting of the sluices and the opening of the gates has seen the removal of the balance beams and modern gates are of metal construction.

At each lock there is a double-fronted two-storey lock keeper's house upon which is fixed either a cast iron or a masonry sign showing the name of the lock and the name and distance to the adjacent locks in each direction. The locks are still operated by lock keepers and passage is only possible when they are in attendance however on La Nouvelle branch operation by boaters is allowed. The locks are open every day except 1 January, 11 November and 25 December, from 08:00 until 17:30 out of season and 08:00 until 19:00 in the summer peak; all locks are closed 12:30 – 13:30 for lunch.

== Profile ==
At its western end, Toulouse, the canal is at an altitude of 132 metres (433 ft) and climbs to 193 metres (633 ft) at its summit level between Ocean Lock and Mediterranee Lock west of Castelnaudary before dropping down to sea level at Sète.

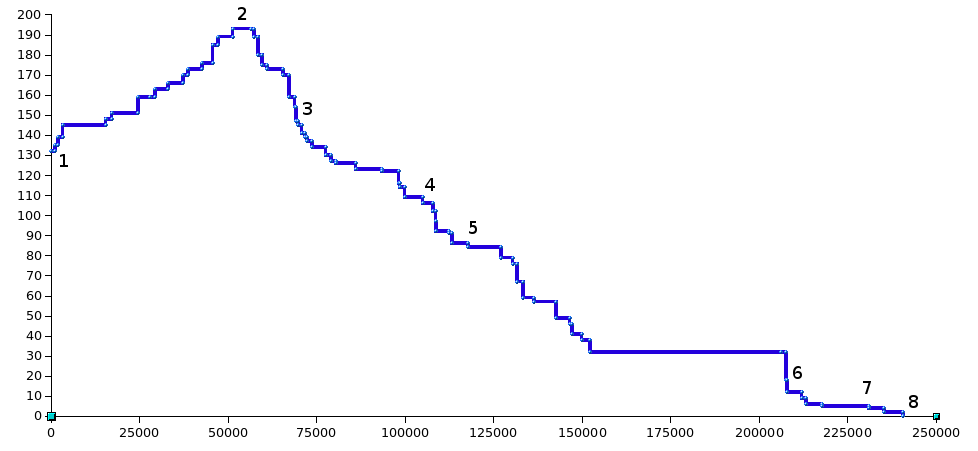
Profile of the Canal du Midi (distances in metres from Toulouse and height in metres above sea-level)

The graph shows the profile of the Canal du Midi from Toulouse (1), through the summit of the canal at Seuil de Naurouze (2), Castelnaudary (3), then Carcassonne (4) and Trèbes (5). The channel continues to Béziers just after Fonsérannes Lock (6), and then on to Agde (7) before flowing in to the Bassin de Thau at Sète (8).

At 193 metres (633 ft), Naurouze is the highest point of the canal with a drop of 57.18 metres (187.6 ft) between the summit and Toulouse and 189.43 metres (621.5 ft) between the summit and Sète. The longest pound is 53.49 kilometres (33.24 mi) between Argens Lock (Aude) and the Fonsérannes Lock (Hérault) while the shortest reach is 250 metres (820 ft) between two locks at Fresquel.

== Locks ==
The following list numbers the locks from the Canal lateral a la Garonne in the west to the Bassin du Thau in the east. Staircase locks are listed as a single entity but the number of individual chambers in the flight is noted. Travelling west to east from Toulouse to Sète the locks numbered 1–18 are ascending and 19–86 are descending.^{[B]} Castanet lock is the first lock with an elliptical chamber, as Riquet realised it was the best fit solution due to mechanical stress from surrounding areas.

Locks in the Canal du Midi
Lock number^{[A]}	Lock name	Coordinates (links to maps and satellite images)	Number of chambers	Distance from Toulouse (km)	Image	Altitude (metres)
1	Béarnais Lock	43.612142°N 1.425618°E	1	1.1		135m
2	Minimes Lock	43.615829°N 1.435984°E	1	2		139m
3	Bayard Lock	43.610786°N 1.453021°E	1	3.6		145m
4	Castanet Lock	43.523582°N 1.518711°E	1	15.7		148m
5	Vic Lock	43.51095°N 1.517295°E	1	17.4		151m
6	Montgiscard Lock	43.463105°N 1.570518°E	1	24.9		155m
7	Aygues-Vives Lock	43.446677°N 1.599266°E	1	28.1		159m
8 - 9	Sanglier Lock	43.43961°N 1.61242°E	2	29.6		163m
10	Négra Lock	43.418499°N 1.641028°E	1	33.3		166m
11 - 12	Laval Lock	43.39853°N 1.679504°E	2	37.5		170m
13	Gardouch Lock	43.391631°N 1.691761°E	1	38.9		173m
14	Renneville Lock	43.383070°N 1.727608°E	1	43.0		176m
15 - 16	Encassan Lock	43.368891°N 1.756014°E	2	45.9		185m
17	Emborrel Lock	43.363113°N 1.773073°E	1	47.5		189m
18	Océan Lock	43.355309°N 1.818083°E	1	51.6		193m
51.5	Summit (Seuil de Naurouze)	43.355309°N 1.818083°E		52		193m
19	Méditerranée Lock	43.330160°N 1.861777°E	1	56.6		193m
20-21	Roc Lock	43.328685°N 1.870472°E	2	57.5		189m
22 -24	Laurens Lock	43.325246°N 1.884968°E	3	58.7		180m
25	Domergue Lock	43.323029°N 1.898843°E	1	59.7		175m
26	Laplanque Lock	43.320900°N 1.913678°E	1	60.9		173m
27 - 30	Saint-Roch Lock	43.311834°N 1.961133°E	4	65.4		170m
31 - 32	Gay Lock	43.305225°N 1.977624°E	2	67.1		159m
33 - 35	Vivier Lock	43.297457°N 1.994101°E	3	68.7		154m
36	Guilhermin Lock	43.296145°N 1.999405°E	1	69.1		147m
37	Saint-Sernin Lock	43.29320°N 2.00505°E	1	69.7		145m
38	Guerre Lock	43.290083°N 2.015755°E	1	70.6		141m
39	Peyruque Lock	43.286689°N 2.028383°E	1	71.7		139m
40	Criminelle Lock	43.28532°N 2.03417°E	1	72.2		137m
41	Tréboul Lock	43.280219°N 2.049757°E	1	73.6		134m
42	Villepinte Lock	43.274°N 2.09412°E	1	77.4		130m
43	Sauzens Lock	43.26544°N 2.10980°E	1	79		127m
44	Bram Lock	43.25830°N 2.12011°E	1	80.3		126m
45	Béteille Lock	43.235532°N 2.180042°E	1	85.9		123m
46	Villeséquelande Lock	43.234812°N 2.245796°E	1	93.4		122m
47 - 48	Lalande Lock	43.239241°N 2.285786°E	2	98.2		116m
49	Herminis Lock	43.237300°N 2.288296°E	1	98.5		114m
50	Ladouce Lock	43.229506°N 2.301099°E	1	99.9		109m
51	Carcassonne Lock	43.217409°N 2.351585°E	1	105.5		106m
52	Saint-Jean Lock	43.232295°N 2.375039°E	1	108.0		102m
53 - 54	Fresquel Double Lock	43.238394°N 2.374646°E	2	108.8		97m
55	Fresquel Single Lock	43.240847°N 2.379621°E	1	109.0		92m
56	Evêque Lock	43.235572°N 2.413292°E	1	112.6		91m
57	Villedubert Lock	43.229698°N 2.413303°E	1	113.4		86m
58 - 60	Trèbes Lock	43.206848°N 2.449276°E	3	118		84m
61	Marseillette Lock	43.205563°N 2.549688°E	1	127.2		79m
62 - 64	Fonfile Lock	43.210825°N 2.584946°E	3	130.4		76m
65 - 66	Saint-Martin Lock	43.217296°N 2.596895°E	2	131.6		67m
67 - 68	Aiguille Lock	43.229629°N 2.605914°E	2	133.4		59m
69 - 70	Puichéric Lock	43.230855°N 2.638368°E	2	136.4		57m
71	Jouarres Lock	43.261912°N 2.686302°E	1	142.7		49m
72	Homps Lock	43.269874°N 2.729844°E	1	146.4		46m
73 - 74	Ognon Lock	43.269768°N 2.738583°E	2	147.1		41m
75 - 76	Pechlaurier Lock	43.25023°N 2.757046°E	2	149.8		38m
77	Argens Lock	43.239757°N 2.779187°E	1	152.3		32m
78^{[B]}	Fonserannes Lock	43.330556°N 3.199722°E	6 (+2 unused)	206.6		32m
79	Orb Lock	43.335256°N 3.215434°E	1	208.0		12m
80	Béziers Lock	43.333429°N 3.221367°E	1	208.4		
81	Ariège Lock	43.322535°N 3.265474°E	1	212.5		9m
82	Villeneuve Lock	43.317681°N 3.280495°E	1	213.8		6m
83	Portiragnes Lock	43.304761°N 3.329285°E	1	218.3		5m
84	Agde Round Lock^{[C]}	43.320253°N 3.467624°E	1	231.4		4m
85	Prades Lock	43.325967°N 3.477808°E	1	232.9		3m
86	Bagnas Lock	43.314319°N 3.498874°E	1	235.3		2m

== See also ==
- Aqueducts on the Canal du Midi
- Water features on the Canal du Midi

== Notes ==
^{A} Lock numbers are as given in the appendix of the 1994 edition From Sea to Sea by L.T.C. Rolt
^{B} The flight at Fonserannes was "replaced" by a water slope in 1984 hence the single "lock number". However, the slope has never worked and the 6 flight staircase remains the only way to pass through meaning that there are 91 locks but only 86 numbers.
^{C} Chamber has three sets of gates, the third being the junction with the branch descente dans l'Hérault
