= Argens Lock =

Lock on the Canal du Midi, France

Coordinates: 43.239757°N 2.779187°E

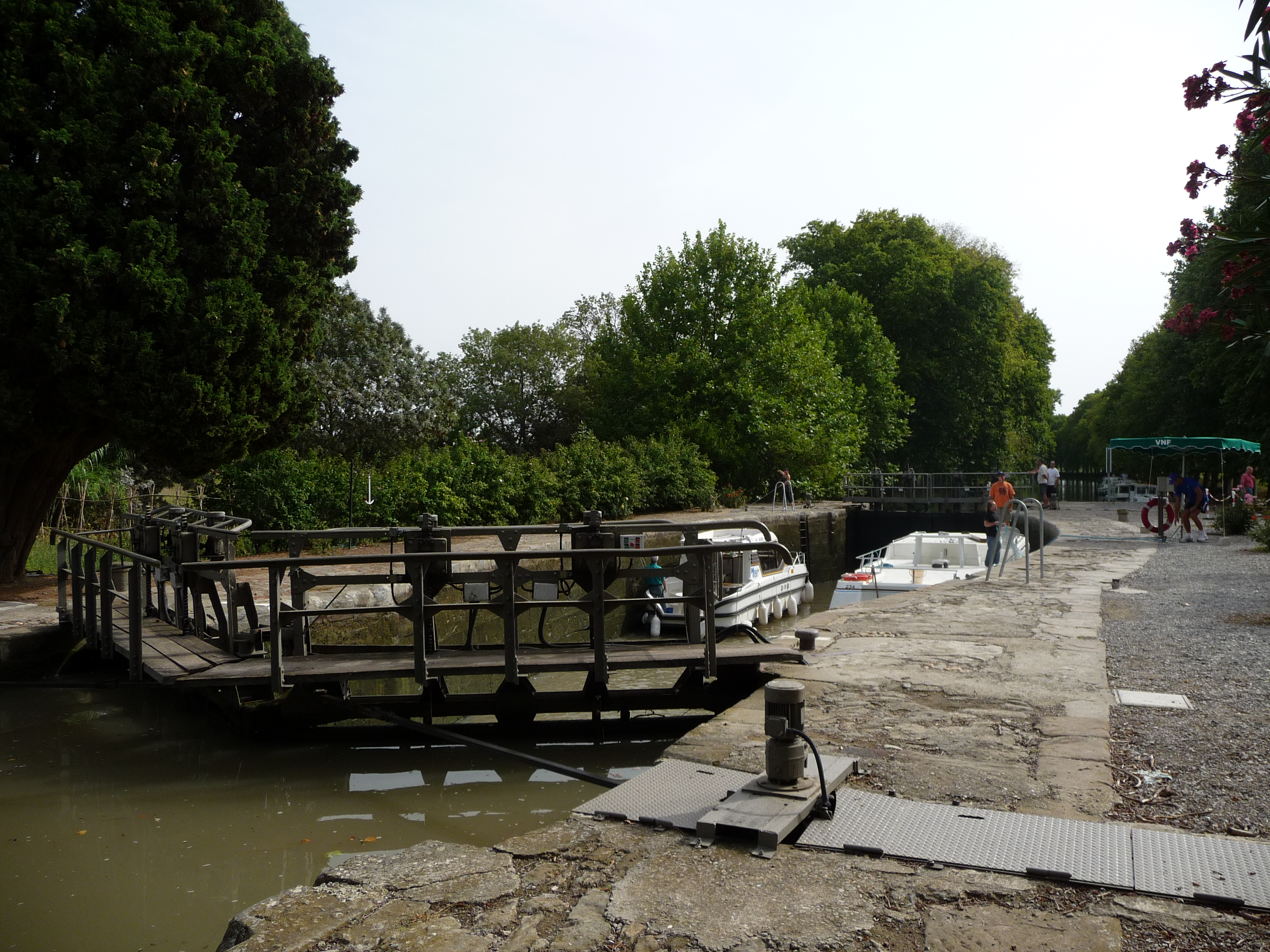

Argens Lock (Occitan: Barratge d'Argens) is a single chamber lock on the Canal du Midi. It lies east of the small town of Argens in the Aude region of Languedoc, France. The adjacent locks are Fonserannes Lock 53,868 metres to the east and Pechlaurier Lock 2485 metres to the west.

== See also ==
- Locks on the Canal du Midi
