= Riquet Obelisk =

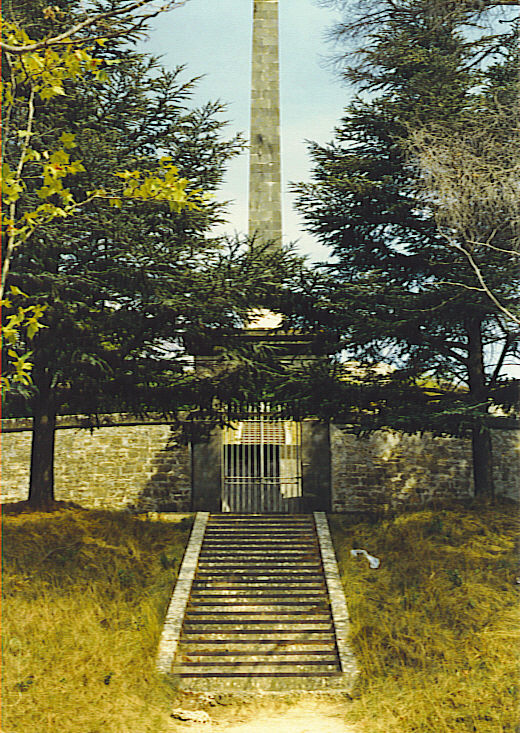
Riquet Monument 43.352361°N 1.826981°E

The Riquet Obelisk (French: Obélisque de Riquet) is dedicated to the creator of the Canal du Midi, Pierre-Paul Riquet. In 1827, the heirs of Riquet built the monument. The obelisk has a dedication: "To Pierre-Paul Riquet, Baron Bonrepos, author of the Two Seas Canal in Languedoc". It is erected near the site of the former octagonal holding tank, called the Bassin de Naurouze, created during the building of the Canal du Midi.

It is in the area of the Seuil de Naurouze on a mountain pass in southern France.
