= Pechlaurier Lock =

Lock on the Canal du Midi, France

Coordinates: 43.25023°N 2.757046°E

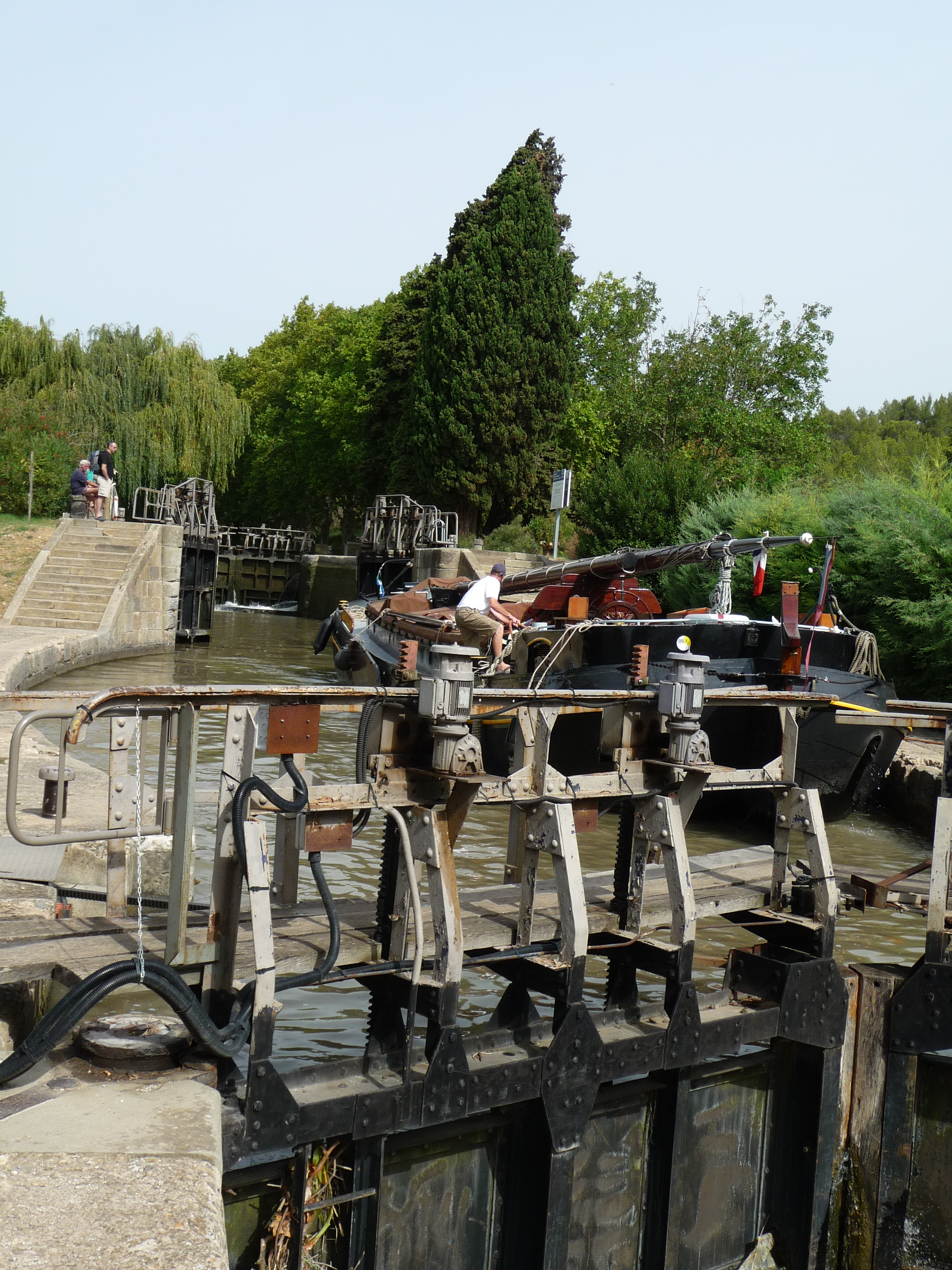

Pechlaurier Lock is a double-chamber lock on the Canal du Midi in the Aude region of Languedoc, France. The adjacent locks are Argens Lock 2,485 metres (8,153 ft) to the east and Ognon Lock 2,726 metres (8,944 ft) to the west.

== See also ==
- Locks on the Canal du Midi
