= Ognon Lock =

Lock on the Canal du Midi, France

Coordinates: 43.269768°N 2.738583°E

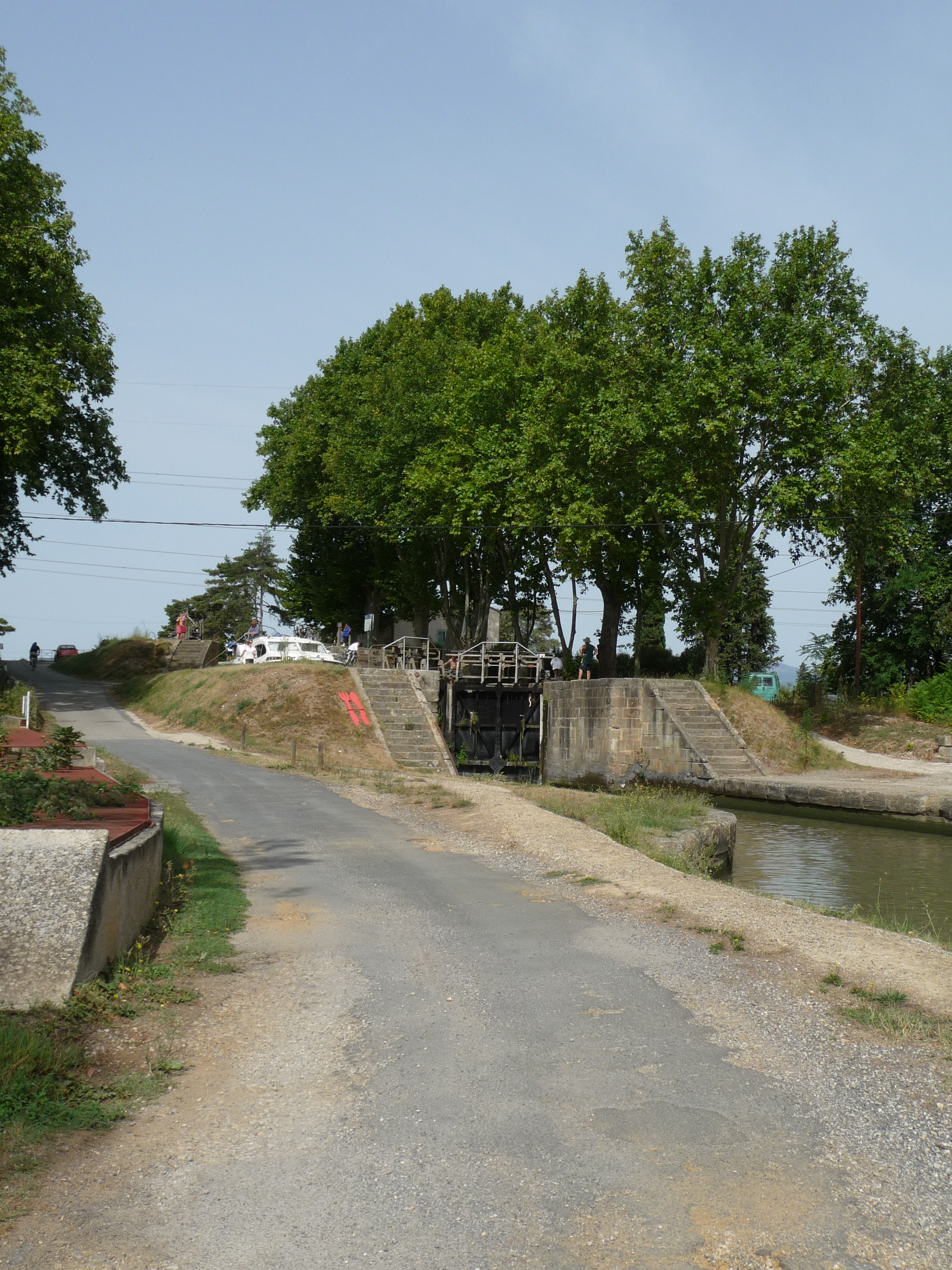

Ognon Lock (Occitan: Cadenat d'Ognon) is a double chamber lock on the Canal du Midi in the Aude region of Languedoc, France. The adjacent locks are Pechlaurier Lock 2726 metres to the east and Homps Lock 689 metres to the west.

== See also ==
- Locks on the Canal du Midi
