= Siphon sluice =

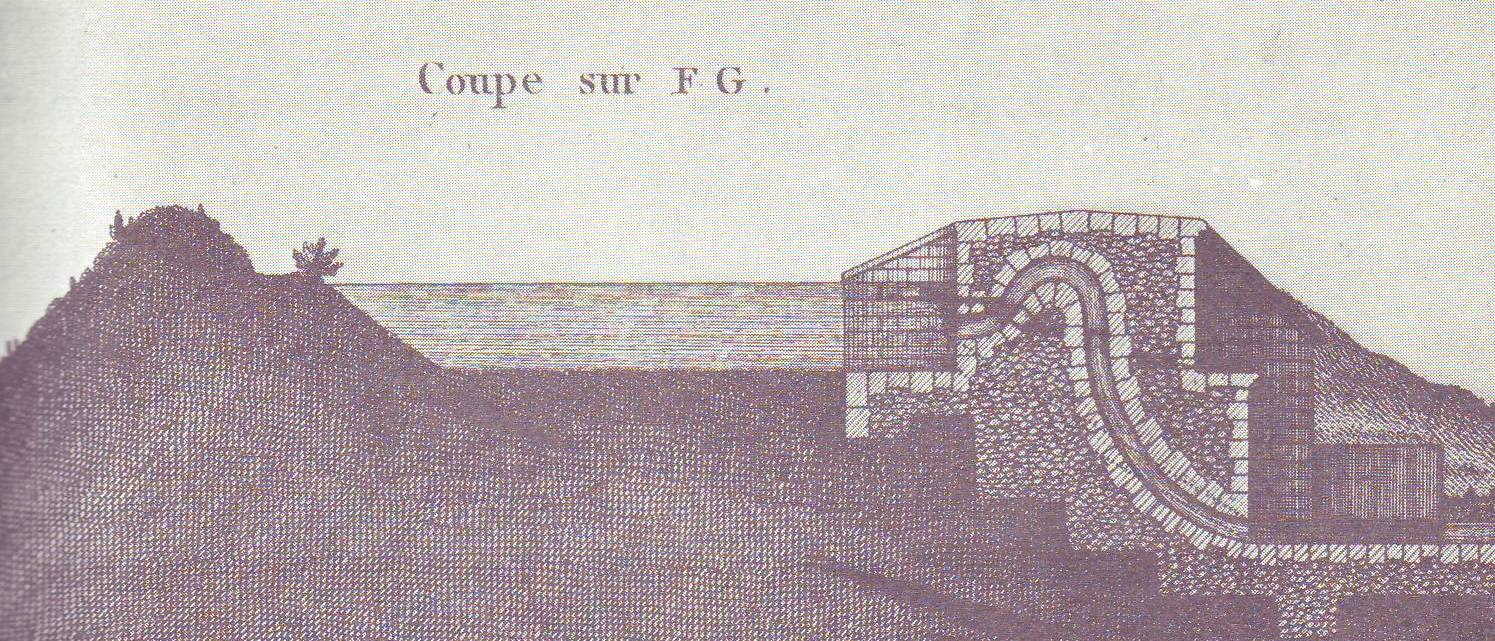
Epanchoir a siphon

Siphon sluices (French: épanchoir à siphon) are one of the many water management devices used on the Canal du Midi to regulate the level of the water. The siphon acts as an automatic water level regulator. The épanchoir à siphon, or siphon sluice, was designed by Bertrand Garripuy (Garipuy) Jr., the son of the chief engineer. The first épanchoir siphon was built in 1776 near Capestang and the second in 1778 at Ventenac.

Though the canal has many spillways to relieve higher water levels, they proved to be insufficient in 1766 when a severe storm in the Languedoc area caused the canal to burst her banks near Capestang. A section of the wall, some 46 yards, long was lost and replaced with a wall. These siphons were added in hopes of preventing this from happening again.

A third siphon was built later at Fer-du-Mulet and a fourth at Marseillette.
