= Bassin de Lampy =

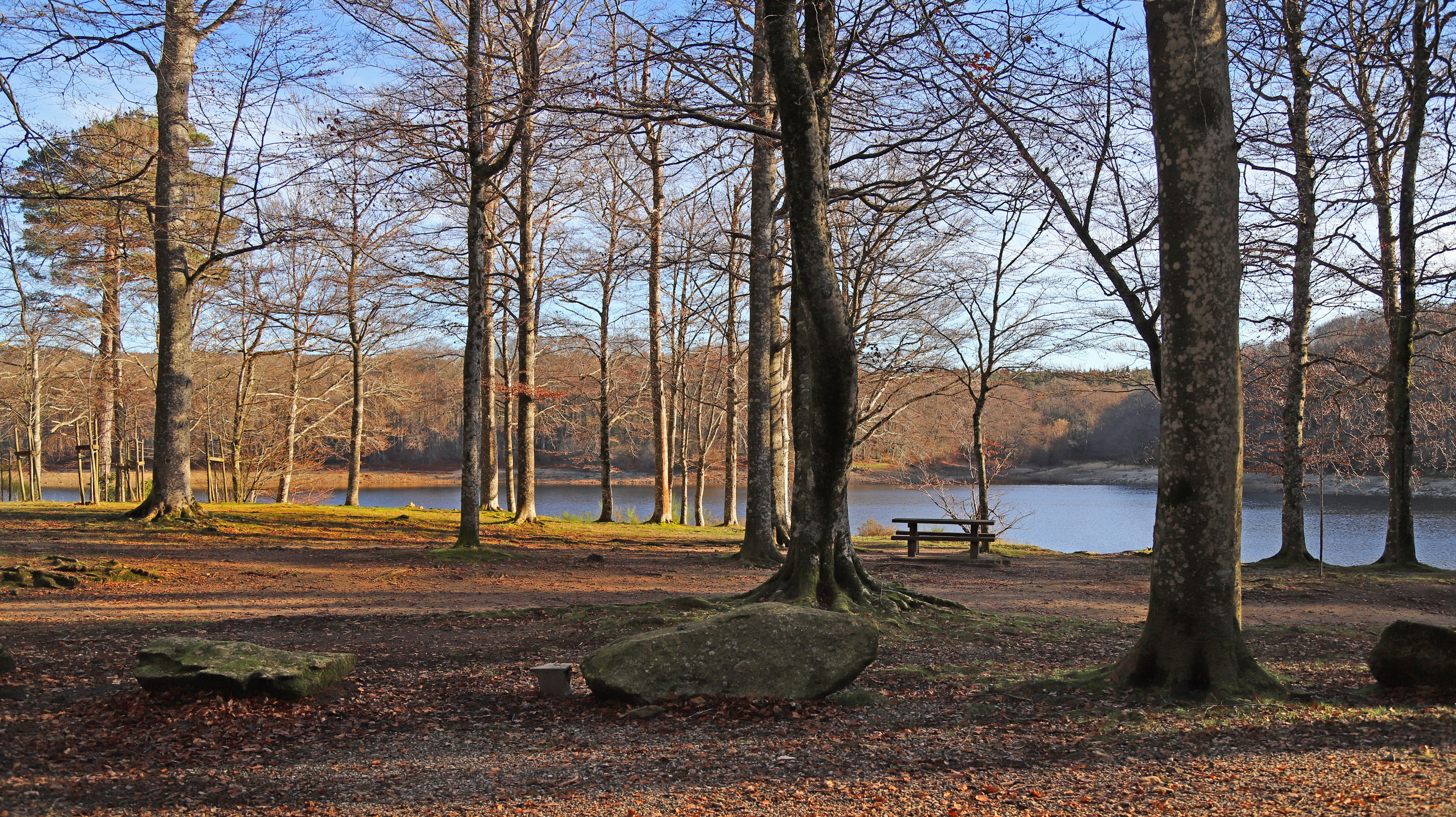

- Location within France
- Location: Aude, near villages of Lampoit and Foncroisette
- Coordinates: 43°24′03″N 2°10′22″E
- Type: Reservoir
- Primary inflows: Lampy
- Catchment area: Lampy Valley
- Basin countries: France
- Surface area: 24 ha (59 acres)
- Water volume: 1,600,000 m^{3} (57,000,000 cu ft)

The Bassin de Lampy was created during 1777 and 1781 when a dam was placed on the Lampy Valley in the Aude department in south-central France. The reservoir provides a source of water for the Canal du Midi. It was originally proposed in 1665 by the commission created by Louis XIV to evaluate Pierre-Paul Riquet's plan for the canal enterprise.

The original reservoir in support of the canal was at Bassin de St. Ferréol. In 1776 a link was provided between the canal and the Aude and the Canal de la Robine at Narbonne. This connection and an increase in barge traffic led to a requirement for more water.

A short time after the dam was complete, leaks were found. They were stopped by pouring a large quantity of quick lime into the reservoir. The particles of lime thus suspended and were carried into the leaking areas and filled all the openings in the joints of masonry and even into the stone.

The feeder canal from the basin to the canal is 52,552m.

The basin covers some 24 hectares and contains some 1,600,000 cubic metres of water. It flows into the Bassin de St. Ferréol.
