= Mediterranee Lock =

Lock on the Canal du Midi, France

- Écluse de la Méditerranée
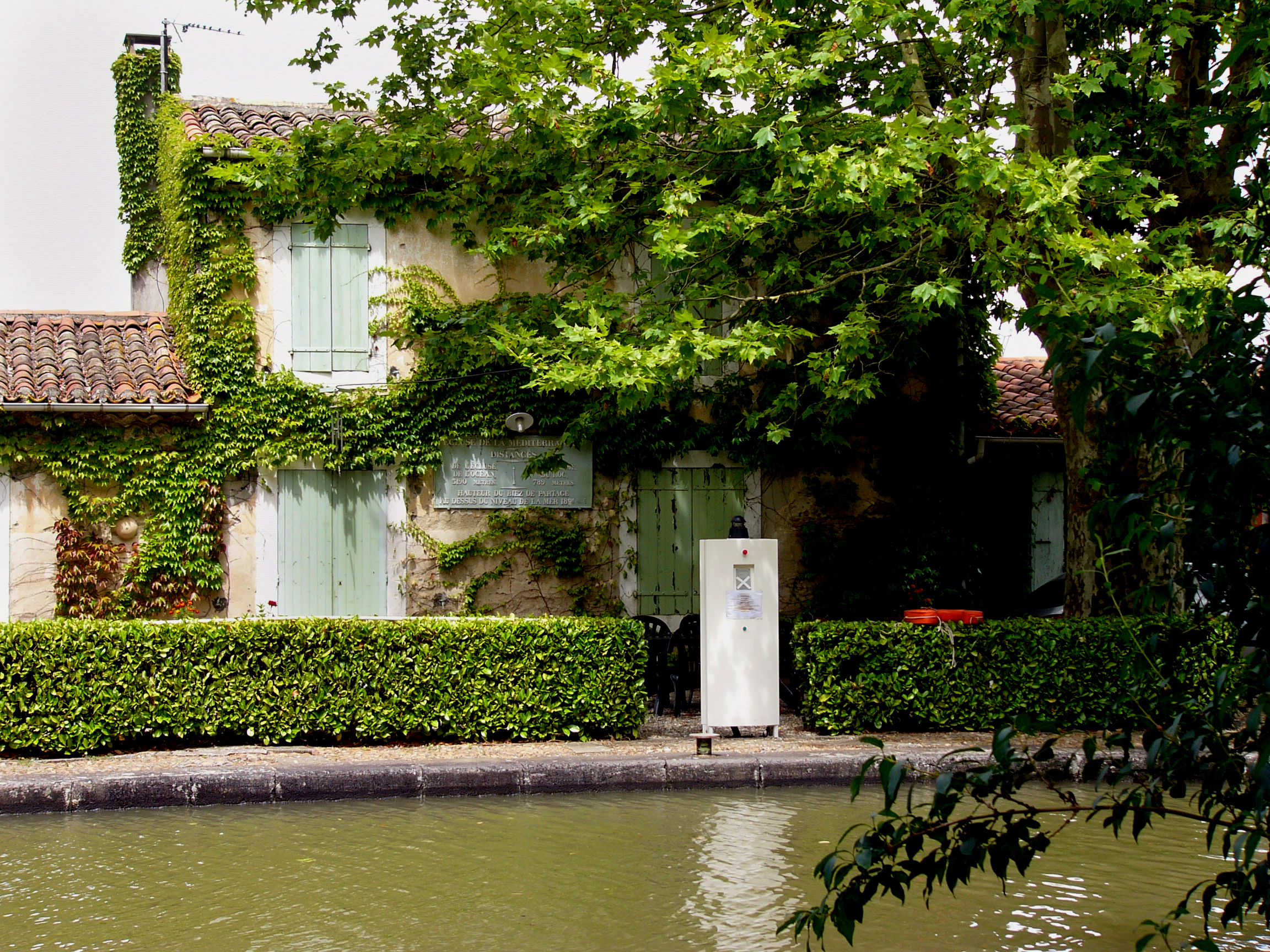
- Lock house at Mediterranee Lock
- Interactive map of Mediterranee Lock
- Location: Mas-Saintes-Puelles, Aude, Occitanie, France
- Coordinates: 43.33016°N 1.861777°E
- Type: Lock

Mediterranee Lock (France)
Mediterranee Lock (Occitanie)

The Mediterranee Lock is a single chamber lock on the Canal du Midi. It was built around 1670, and it is 46.6km from Toulouse. The adjacent locks are the Roc Lock to the east and the Océan Lock to the west. The Mediterranee Lock marks the start of the descending section of the canal going east to west towards the Mediterranean Sea.

It is located in the town of Mas-Saintes-Puelles in the Aude department in the Occitanie region.

== History ==
It was originally called l'écluse du Médecin.

== See also ==
- Locks on the Canal du Midi
