= Bassin de Naurouze =

Coordinates: 43.3526°N 1.8215°E

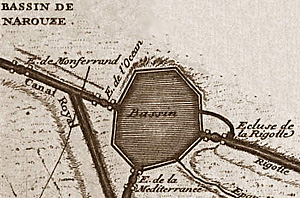
Bassin de Naurouze

The Bassin de Naurouze is an octagonal holding tank, created during the building of the Canal du Midi. It was designed and built by Pierre-Paul Riquet. It was abandoned a few years after construction of the canal because of its recurrent silting problems. The flow of water from the Bassin de Saint-Ferréol joins the Canal du Midi at this point near the Seuil de Naurouze. Riquet hoped to build a city around the basin and considered building a port, however it easily filled with silt and soon fell out of use. A lawn replaced the empty pool, and it is now crossed by a straight path lined with trees.

== Gallery ==
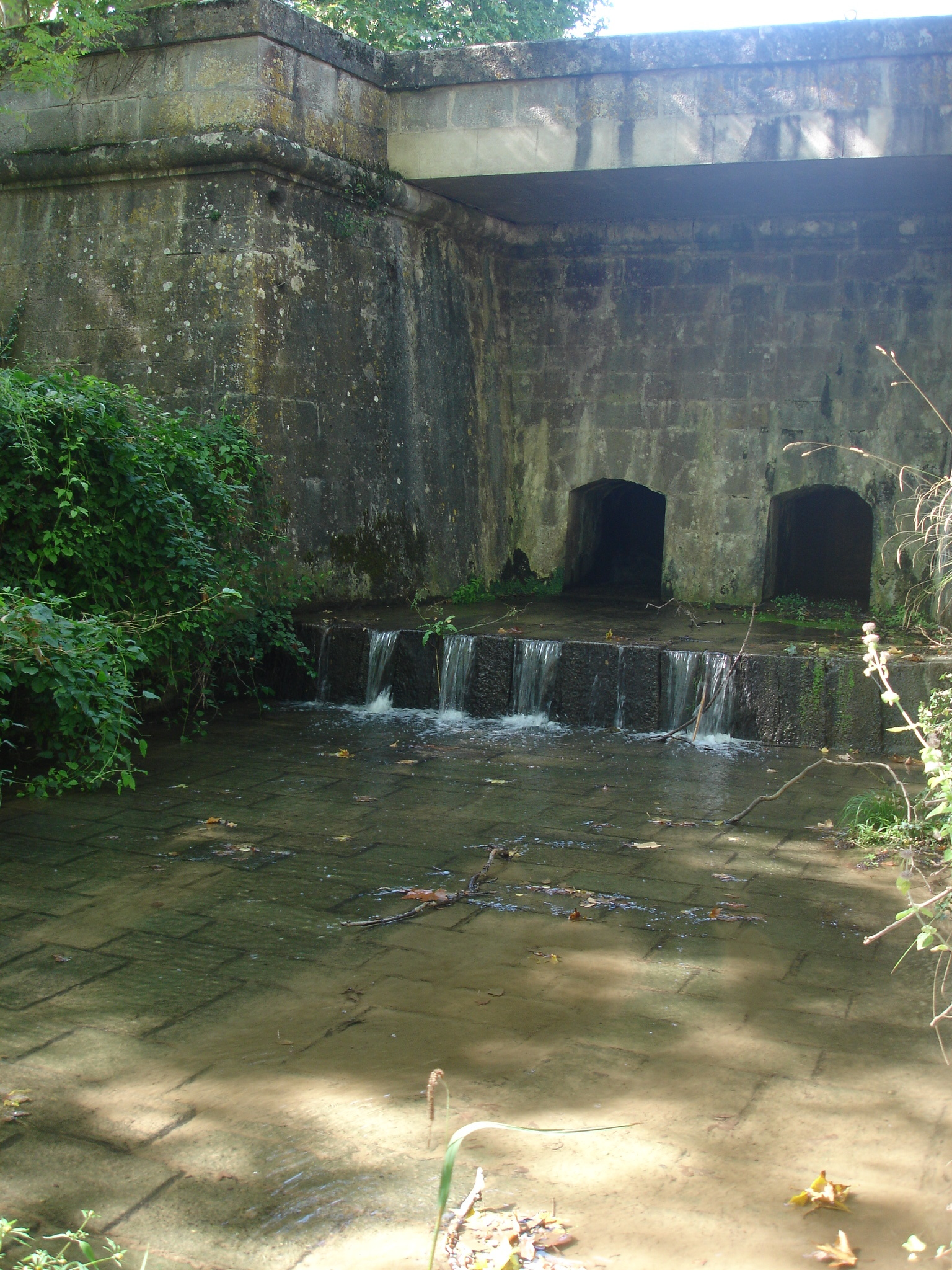
Spillway in Naurouze

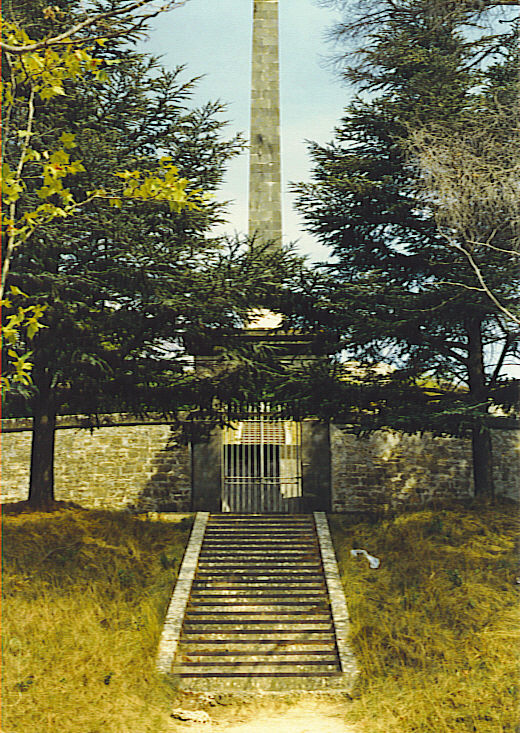
Riquet Obelisk

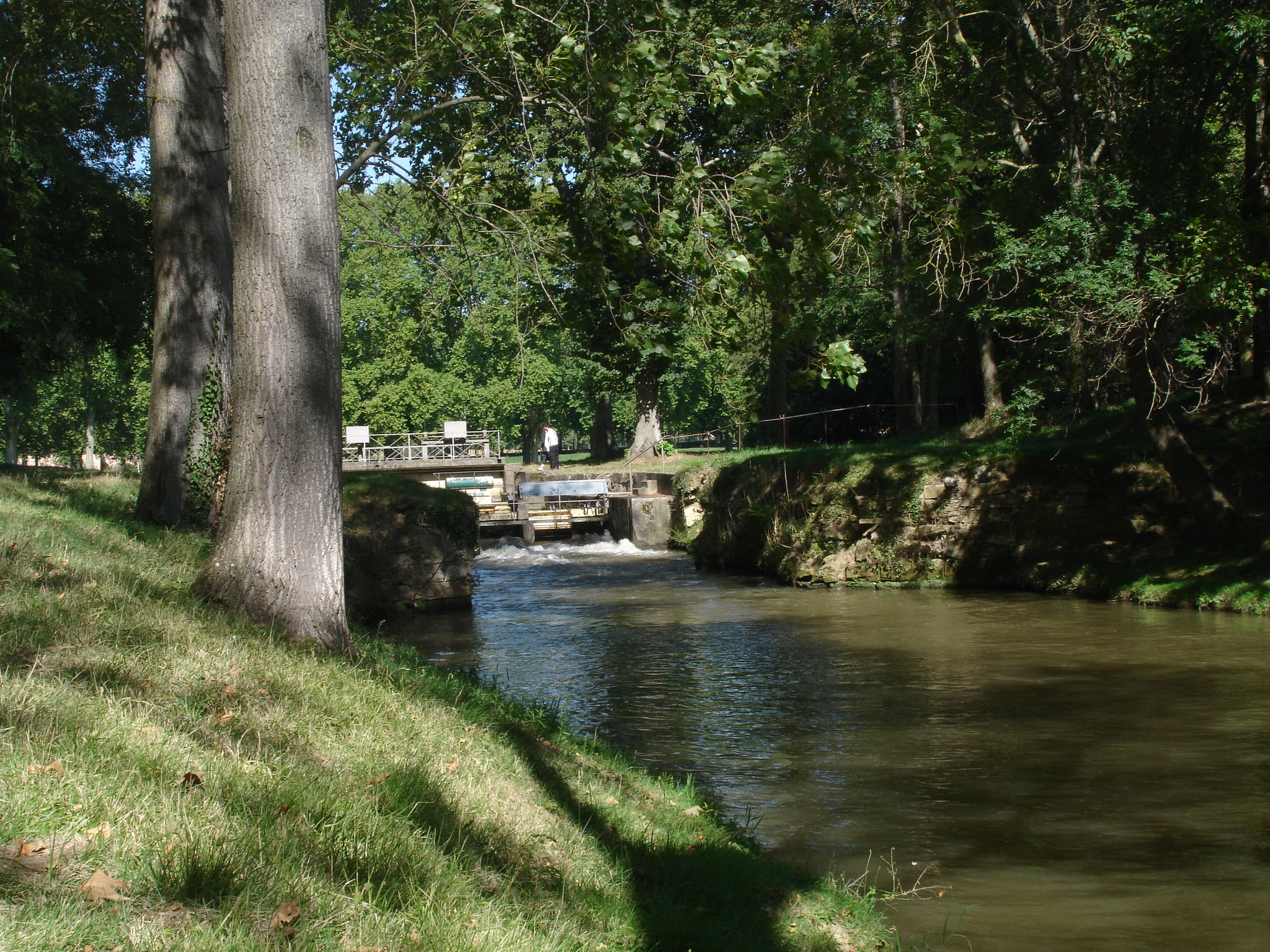
Water joins the Canal from the Bassin de Naurouze

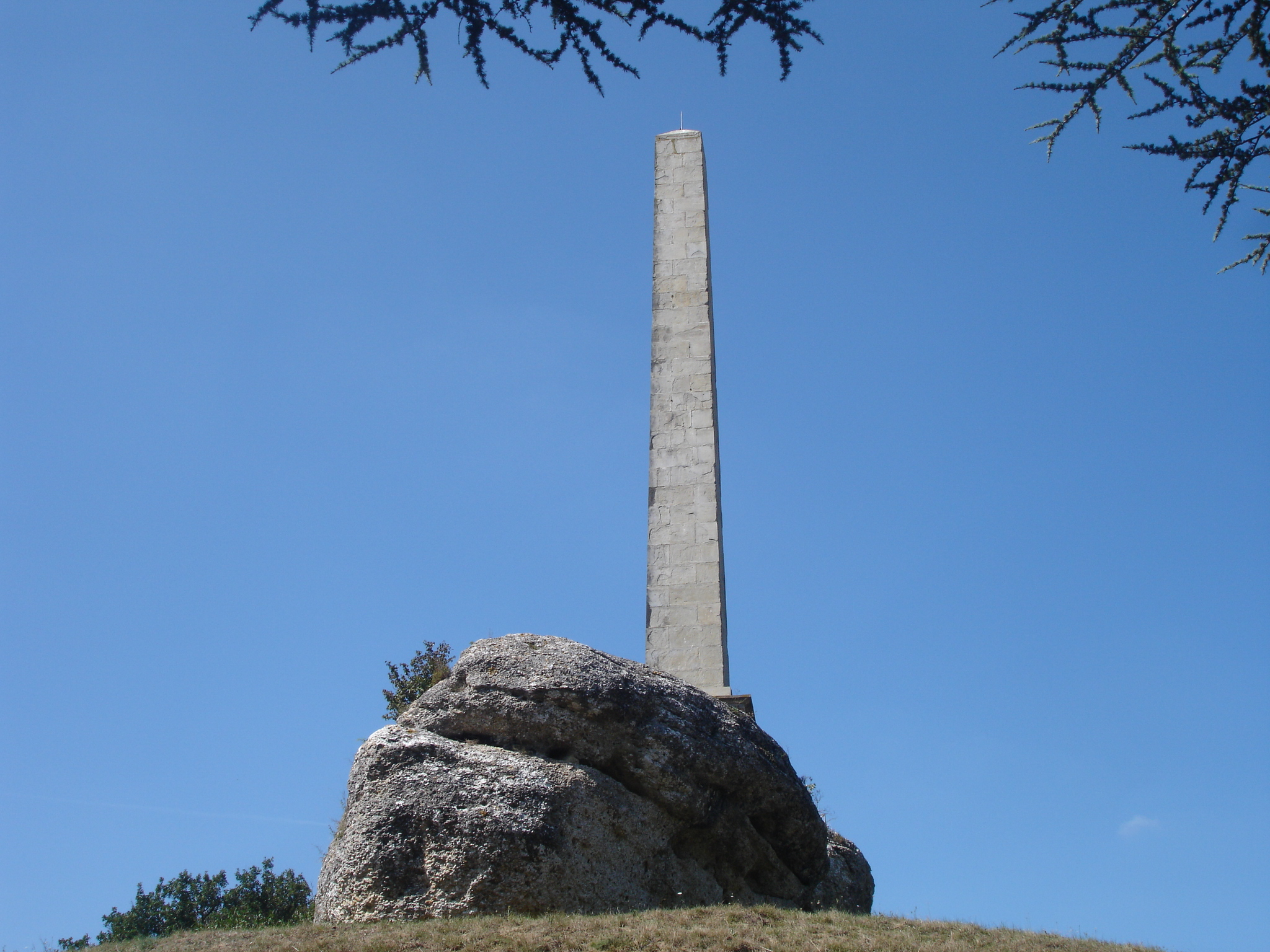
Riquet Obelisk

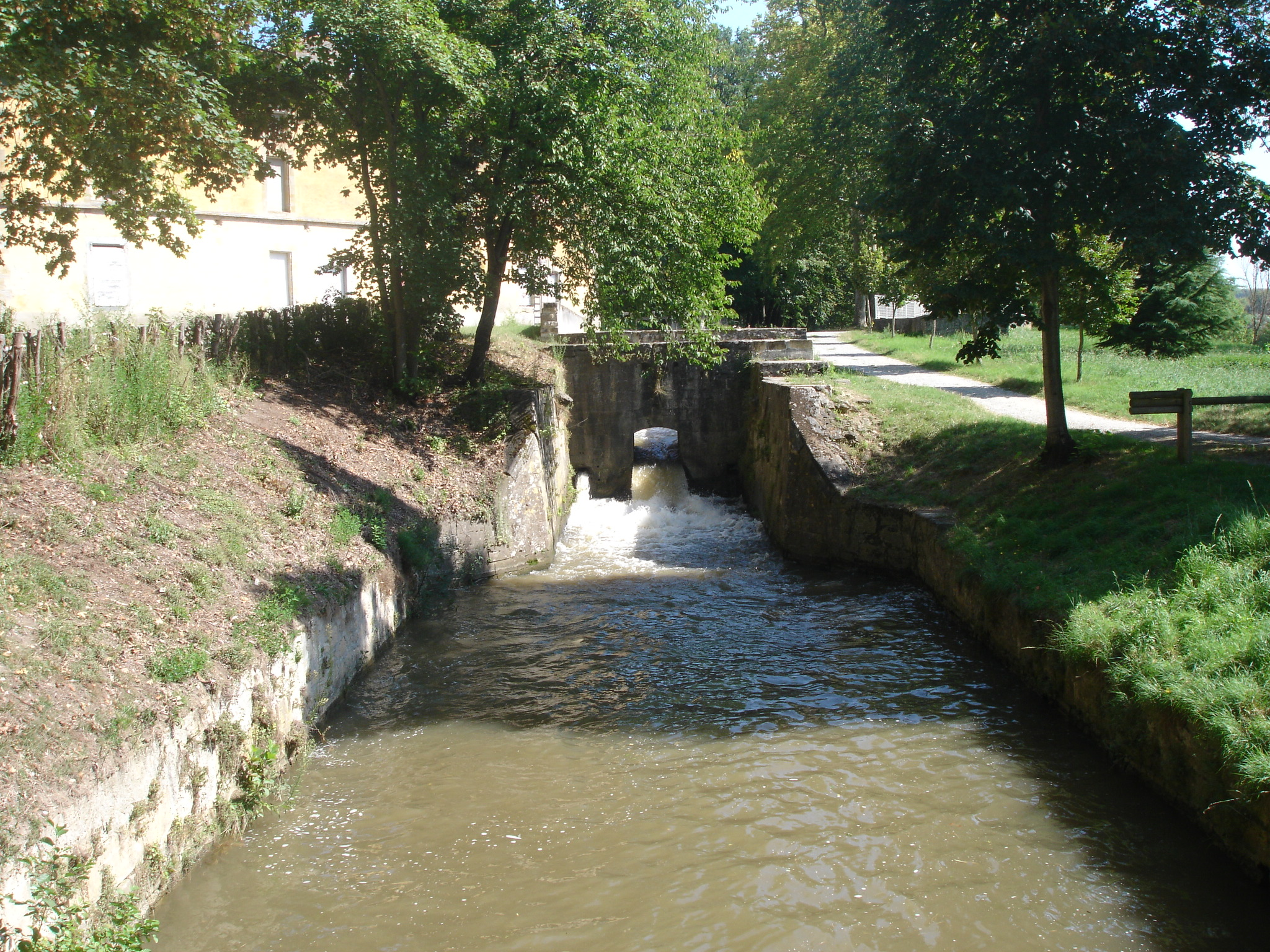
Rigole de la plaine empties into the Bassin de Naurouze

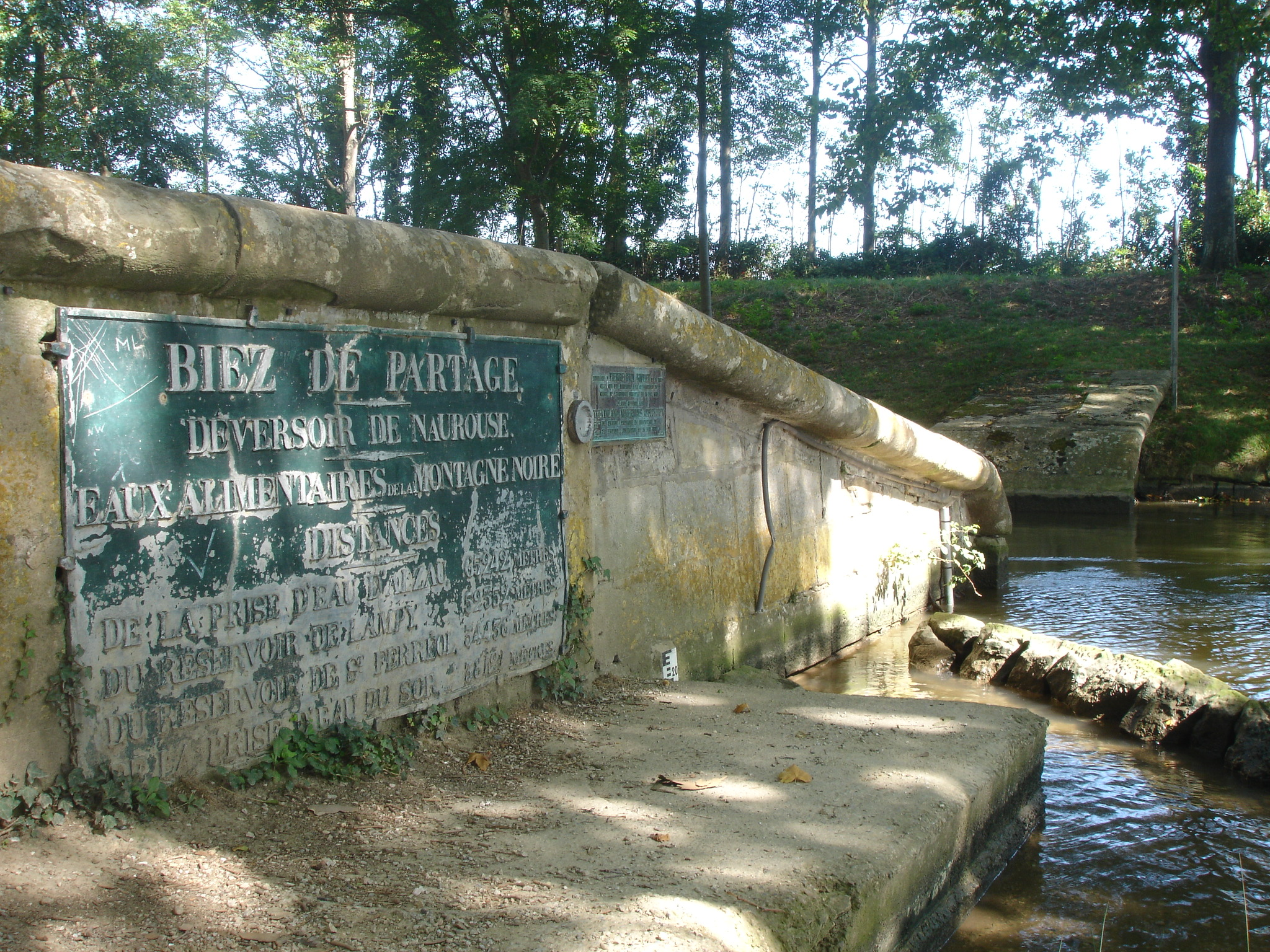
Summit level sign
