= Les Cammazes =

- Commune
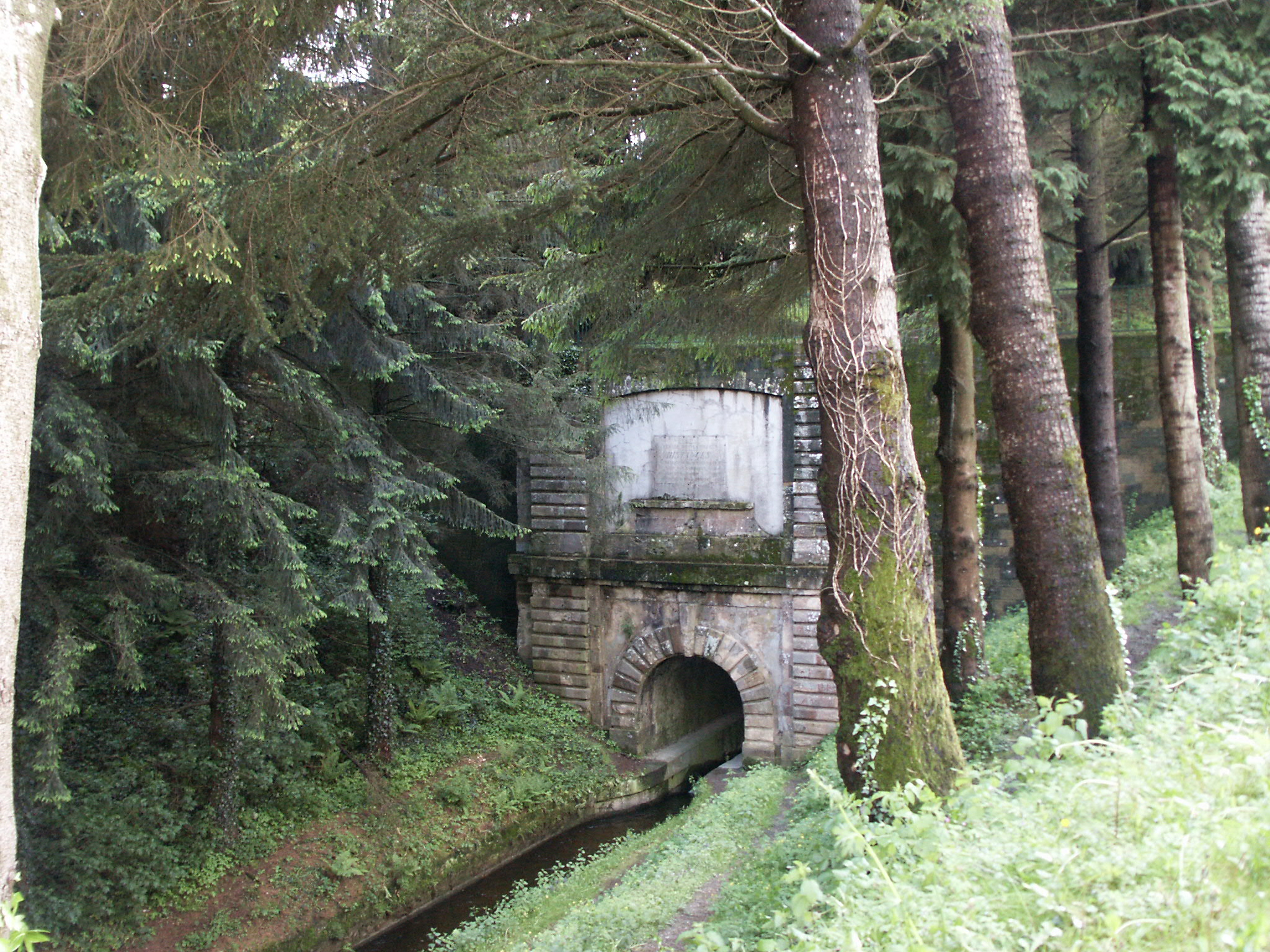
- The canal tunnel in Les Cammazes

- Coat of arms
- Location of Les Cammazes
- Location within France Location within Occitanie
- Coordinates: 43°24′44″N 2°04′47″E
- Country: France
- Region: Occitania
- Department: Tarn
- Arrondissement: Castres
- Canton: La Montagne noire
- Intercommunality: CC aux sources du Canal du Midi

Government
  - Mayor (2020–2026): Alain Mary
- Area^{1}: 7.68 km^{2} (2.97 sq mi)
- Elevation: 609 m (1,998 ft)
- Highest elevation: 653 m (2,142 ft)
- Lowest elevation: 410 m (1,350 ft)
- Population (2023): 398
  - Density: 51.8/km^{2} (134/sq mi)
- Time zone: UTC+01:00 (CET)
  - Summer (DST): UTC+02:00 (CEST)
- INSEE/Postal code: 81055 /81540
- ^{1} French Land Register data, which excludes lakes, ponds, glaciers > 1 km^{2} (0.386 sq mi or 247 acres) and river estuaries.

Les Cammazes (French pronunciation: [le kamaz]; Occitan: Les Capmases) is a commune in the Tarn department and Occitanie region of southern France.

== Demography ==
Historical population
| Year | Pop. | ±% p.a. |
|---|---|---|
| 1968 | 213 | — |
| 1975 | 201 | −0.82% |
| 1982 | 174 | −2.04% |
| 1990 | 179 | +0.35% |
| 1999 | 209 | +1.74% |
| 2007 | 304 | +4.80% |
| 2012 | 284 | −1.35% |
| 2017 | 340 | +3.66% |
| 2023 | 398 | +2.66% |
Source: INSEE

== See also ==
- Communes of the Tarn department
