= Rigole de la plaine =

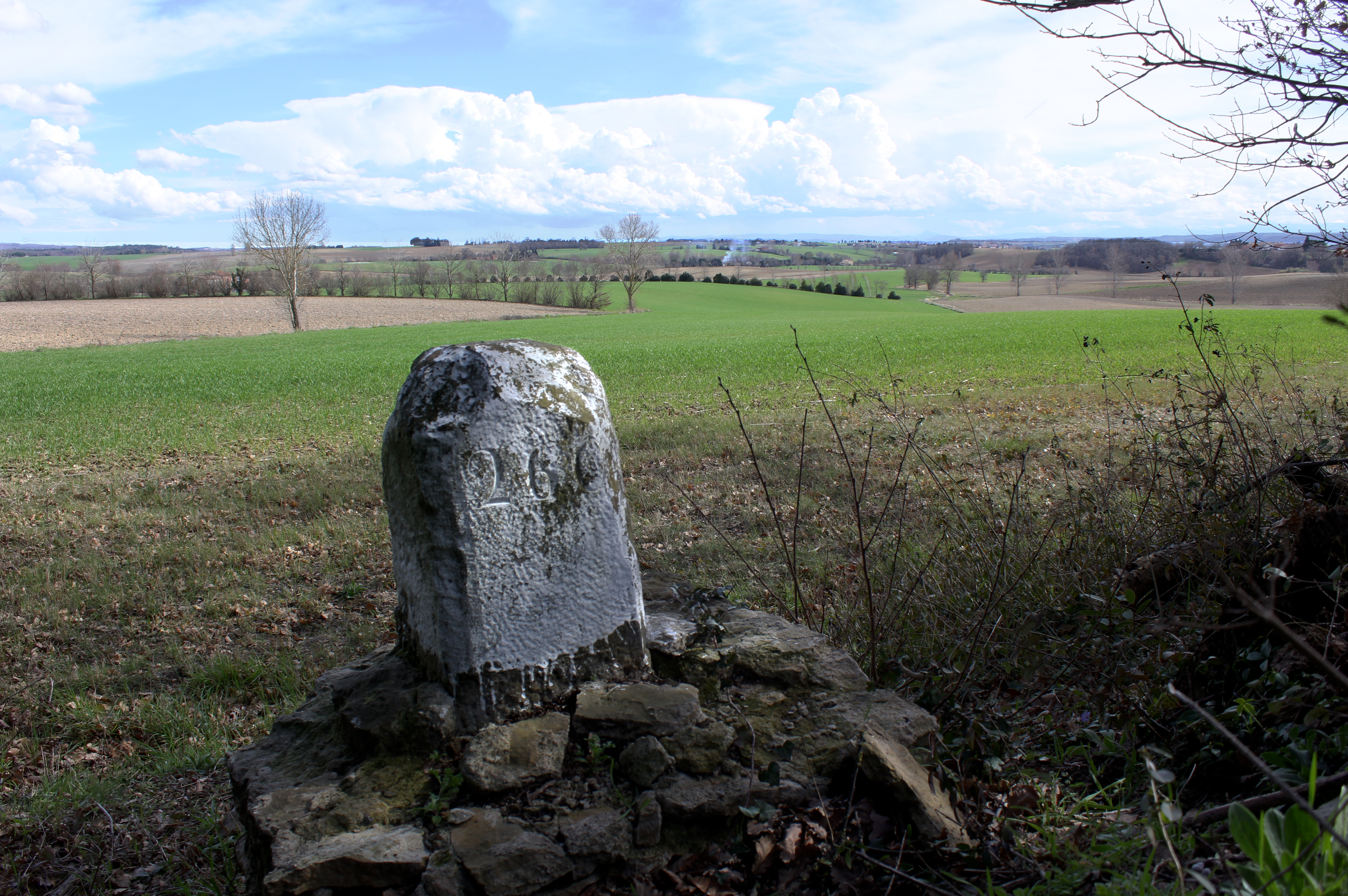
Boundary stone of the Canal du Midi

The critical feature of the Canal du Midi was to provide sufficient water to ensure that the lock system continued to function, even through the summer months. The first part of this endeavor was the rigole de la plaine (French: trickle of the plain). It carried water from the Sor River, at Pontcrouzet, to the Bassin de Naurouze, where the water was to enter the canal. This was done in 1667.

In 1668 Riquet built a loading basin, near Revel, on the rigole de la plaine between Pont Crouzet, on the river Sor, and Naurouze, called Port Louis. The feeder between this point and Naurouze was expanded in order for boats to ferry stones. Fourteen locks were put in place.

In 1669 Riquet widened the rigole de la plaine enough to support navigation. It was opened to traffic in 1670 from Revel, to Naurouze. Pierre Borel had the original idea for this feature.
