= Aqueducts on the Canal du Midi =

Aqueducts on the Canal du Midi allow the canal to intersect and cross over natural streams. There are two exceptions, the first is the Herbettes Aqueduct where it crosses a four-lane highway in Toulouse. Another exception is where it intersects with the Libron river and the crossing is accomplished via the Ouvrages du Libron.

Aqueducts on the Canal du Midi will be named either as an aqueduct (French: aqueduc) or a canal bridge (French: pont-canal). In most cases, the aqueduct is a more simple structure, just allowing the stream to pass under the canal. The pont-canal, on the other hand, is a much larger bridge style structure with perhaps more than one arch.

Orb Aqueduct	Repudre aqueduct	Cesse Aqueduct

Aqueducts on Canal du Midi Codes: A=Aqueducts, CB=Canal Bridge, LC=Libron Crossing, Tu=Tunnel
Code	PK^{[A]}	Name	Lat/Lon	Comment
CB	8.1	Herbettes Aqueduct	43°34′27.31″N 1°28′10″E	(French: Pont-canal des Herbettes)
A	12.8	Madron Aqueduct	43.53850°N 1.49313°E	(French: Aqueduc de Madron)
A	18.4	Rieumory Aqueduct	43.50416°N 1.52356°E	(French: Aqueduc de Rieumory)
A	21.2	Juncasse Aqueduct	43.48817°N 1.54398°E	(French: Aqueduc de la Juncasse)
A	26.5	Nostreseigne Aqueduct	43.45554°N 1.59031°E	(French: Aqueduc de Nostreseigné)
A	28.3	Ayguesvives Aqueduct	43.44525°N 1.60272°E	(French: Aqueduc d'Ayguesives)
A	30.5	Encons Aqueduct	43.43366°N 1.61930°E	(French: Aqueduc d'Encons)
A	33.6	Negra Aqueduct	43.41811°N 1.64127°E	(French: Aqueduc de Négra)
A	38.5	Gardouch Aqueduct	43°23′36.79″N 1°41′16.90″E	(French: Aqueduc de Gardouch)
A	40.5	Hers Aqueduct	43.3861°N 1.7088°E	(French: Aqueduc de l'Hers)
A	47.7	Radel Aqueduct	43.36260°N 1.77515°E	(French: Aqueduc de Radel)
-	52.1	Summit stretch	43°21′19″N 1°49′5″E	
A	52.3	Vasague Aqueduct	43.34780°N 1.82109°E	(French: Aqueduc de Vasague)
A	73.2	Tréboul Aqueduct	43°16′50.42″N 2°02′54.99″E	(French: Aqueduc de Tréboul)
A	76.3	Mezuran Aqueduct	43.27583°N 2.07955°E	(French: Aqueduc de Mezuran)
A	83.7	Rébenty Aqueduct	43°14′39.11″N 2°09′20.98″E	(French: Aqueduc de Rébenty)
A	87.9	Espitalet Aqueduct	43°13′58.53″N 2°12′16.46″E	(French: Aqueduc de l'Espitalet)
A	91.9	Elfaix Aqueduct	43.22935°N 2.23952°E	(French: Aqueduc d'Elfaix)
A	93.7	Sauzens Aqueduct	43.23794°N 2.25170°E	(French: Aqueduc de Sauzens)
A	101.1	Saume Aqueduct	43.22619°N 2.31322°E	(French: Aqueduc de Saume)
A	102.6	Arnouze Aqueduct		(French: Aqueduc de l'Arnouze)
A	106.2	St-Nazaire Aqueduct		(French: Aqueduc de St-Nazaire)
CB	108.6	Fresquel Aqueduct	43°14′15.32″N 2°22′23.56″E	(French: Pont canal du Fresquel)
A	111.9	Trapel Aqueduct		(French: Aqueduc du Trapel)
A	114.6	Dejean Aqueduct		(French: Aqueduc de Dejean)
CB	116.7	Orbiel Aqueduct	43°12′52.39″N 2°26′21.51″E	(French: pont canal d'Orbiel)
A	118	St Felix Aqueduct		(French: Aqueduc de St-Félix)
A	124	Millegrand Aqueduct		(French: Aqueduc de Millegrand)
A	124.6	Mercier Aqueduct		(French: Aqueduc de Mercier)
A	131.8	St Martin Aqueduct		(French: Aqueduc de St-Martin)
A	133.6	Aiguille Aqueduct	43.23041°N 2.60857°E	(French: Aqueduc de l'Aiguille)
A	139.6	Rivassel Aqueduct	43.248°N 2.65946°E	(French: Aqueduc du Rivassel)
A	140.6	Argent-Double Aqueduct	43°15′04.00″N 2°39′58.27″E	(French: Aqueduc d'Argentdoublev)
A	143.6	Jouarres Aqueduct	43.26421°N 2.69633°E	(French: Aqueduc de Jouarres)
A	147.0	Ognon Aqueduct	43.26958°N 2.73926°E	(French: Aqueduc d'Ognon)
A	148.1	Bassane Aqueduct		(French: Aqueduc de Bassane)
A	149.7	Pechlaurier		(French: Aqueduc de Pechlaurier)
A	155.8	Roubia Aqueduct		(French: Aqueduc de Roubia)
CB	158.8	Répudre Aqueduct	43°15′15.90″N 2°50′24.44″E	(French: pont canal de Répudre)
A	161.5	Ventenac Aqueduct		(French: Aqueduc de Ventenac)
CB	168.0	Cesse Aqueduct	43°16′48″N 2°54′55″E	(French: pont canal de Cesse)
A	177.8	Pradel Aqueduct		(French: Aqueduc de Pradel)
A	178.8	Quarante Aqueduct		(French: Aqueduc de Quarante)
A	184.7	Ramboulias Aqueduct		(French: Aqueduc de Ramboulias)
A	187.4	Nostreseigne Aqueduct	43.45554°N 1.59031°E	(French: Aqueduc de Nostreseigné)
A	188.6	Saisse Aqueduct		(French: Aqueduc de Saisse)
A	190.2	St Pierre Aqueduct		(French: Aqueduc de St-Pierre)
A	191.7	Guery Aqueduct		(French: Aqueduc de Guéry)
A	193.7	Poiles Aqueduct		(French: Aqueduc de Poilhes)
A	194.8	Thou Aqueduct		(French: Aqueduc de Thou)
Tu	198.8	Malpas Tunnel	43°18′26″N 3°7′36″E	
A	199.3	Colombiers Aqueduct		(French: Aqueduc de Colombiers)
CB	207.6	Orb Aqueduct	43°20′04″N 03°12′46″E	(French: Aqueduc de Orb)
LC	225.1	Ouvrages du Libron	43°18′03″N 03°24′15″E	(English: Libron Works)

== Notes ==
^{A} Distance in km from the beginning of the canal in Toulouse.
