= Jean Aubert (engineer) =

French engineer

- Born: 2 July 1894; Paris, France
- Died: 25 November 1984 (aged 90); Paris, France
- Education: Lycée Louis-le-Grand in Paris, École nationale des ponts et chaussées, University of Paris (Bachelor of law)
- Occupation: Engineer
- Known for: Engineer on river and canal works

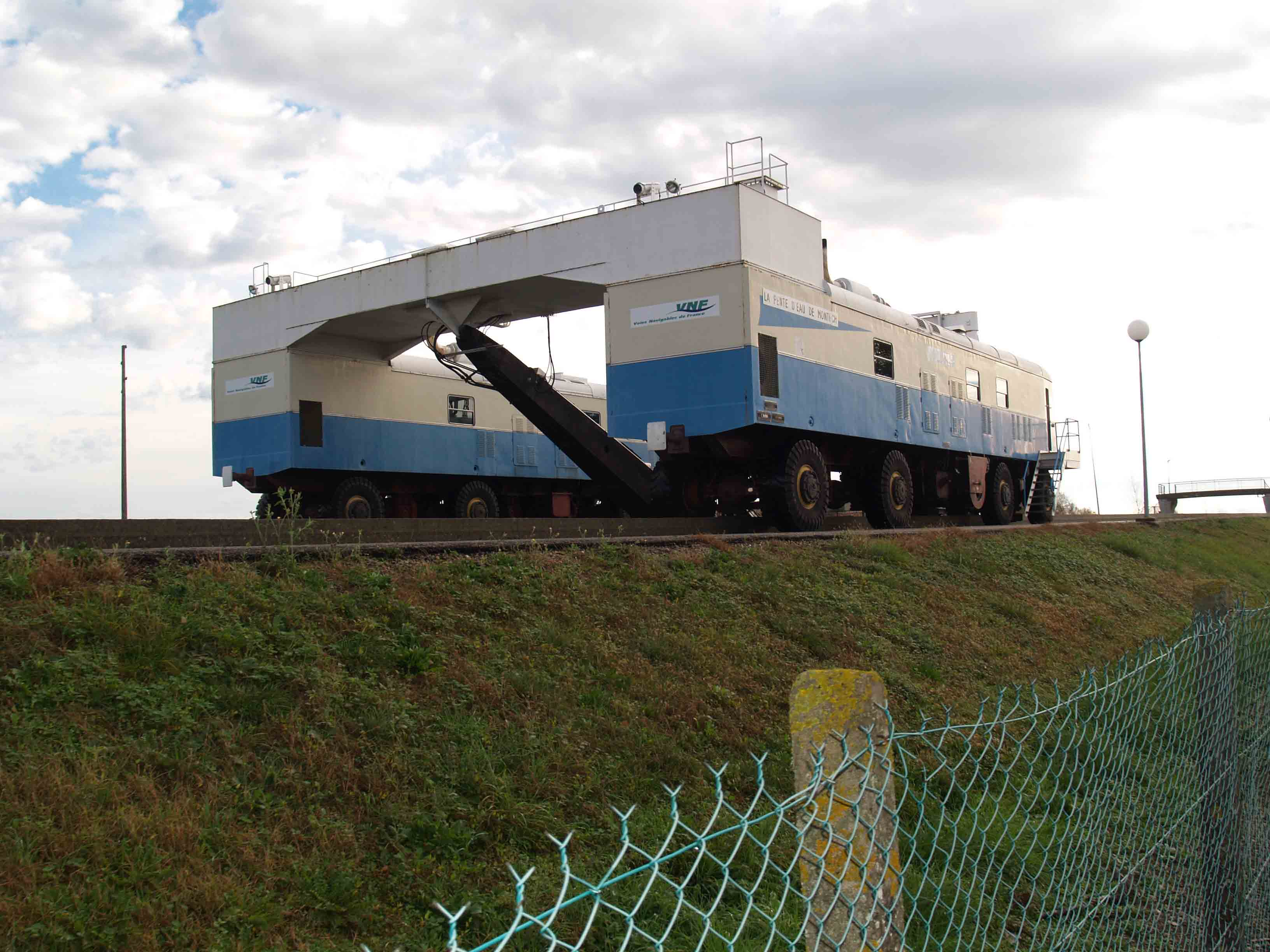
Montech water slope

Jean Aubert was a French engineer. In 1961, he used the idea of the German engineer Julius Greve from the last century to describe a pente d'eau (English: water slope), which was a way of moving boats up the gradient of a canal without locks. The design consisted of a sloping channel, through which a wedge of water on which the boat was floating could be pushed up an incline. This concept was used in both the Montech water slope and the Fonserannes water slopes.

== Education ==
- Lycée Louis-le-Grand in Paris.
- 1913 - École Polytechnique. Soon left for service in First world war. Returned in 1919.
- 1920-1922 - École nationale des ponts et chaussées.
- University of Paris (Bachelor of law).

== Career ==
- 1922-1932 - Engineer in charge of the navigation works in Paris.
- 1932-1961 - Professor in the Chair of Internal Navigation at the École nationale des ponts et chaussées. (English: National School of Bridges and Roads)
- 1933-1945 - General manager and later chairman of the Compagnie Nationale du Rhône.
- 1945-1953 - Chairman of the electricity board of the SNCF
- 1949-1967 - Chairman of the Rhine Navigation Company
- years unknown - Chairman of the Société de Construction des Batignolles.
- years unknown - President, Societe des Ingenieurs Civils de France.
- years unknown - Inspecteur Général des Ponts et Chaussées
- 1966-unknown - Consulting engineer and honorary chairman of Spie Batignolles.
- Chairman of several other companies.

== Publications ==
- In 1919 he published La Probabilité dans les tires de guerre and was awarded the Pierson-Perrim prize by the Académie des Sciences in 1922.
- His article Philosophie de la pente d'eau appeared in the journal Travaux in 1984 when he was 90 years old.
- In 1961 he published his revolutionary ideas on the pente d'eau, or water slope, which was designed to transfer barges from one level to another without the use of locks.

== Awards ==
- Croix de Guerre in 1916.
- Académie des Sciences: Prix Pierson-Perrim 1922.
- Awarded the Caméré prize in 1934 by the Académie des Sciences for a new type of movable dam.
- Ingénieur Général des Ponts et Chaussées 1951,
- Commandeur de la Légion d'honneur 1960.

== Principle works ==
- Construction of the Pont Edouard-Herriort on the Rhône at Lyon.
- Design and construction of the Génissiat dam and Lonzères-Mondragon dam on the Rhône.
- Conception and design of the Denouval dam on the Seine near Andrésy, completed in 1980.
