= Fonseranes Locks =

Flight of locks on the Canal du Midi, France

Coordinates: 43°19′50″N 3°11′59″E

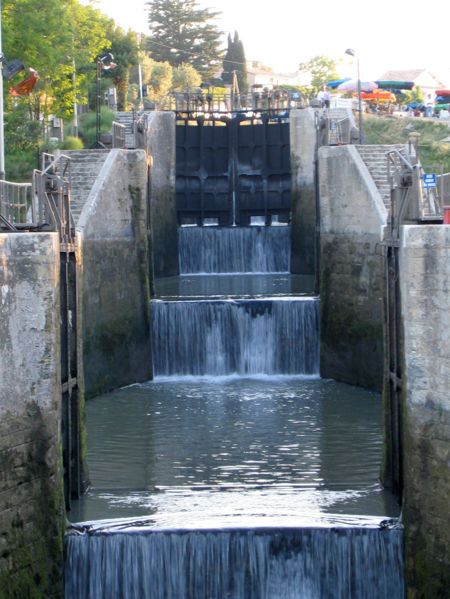
Open locks, seen from the bottom of the flight

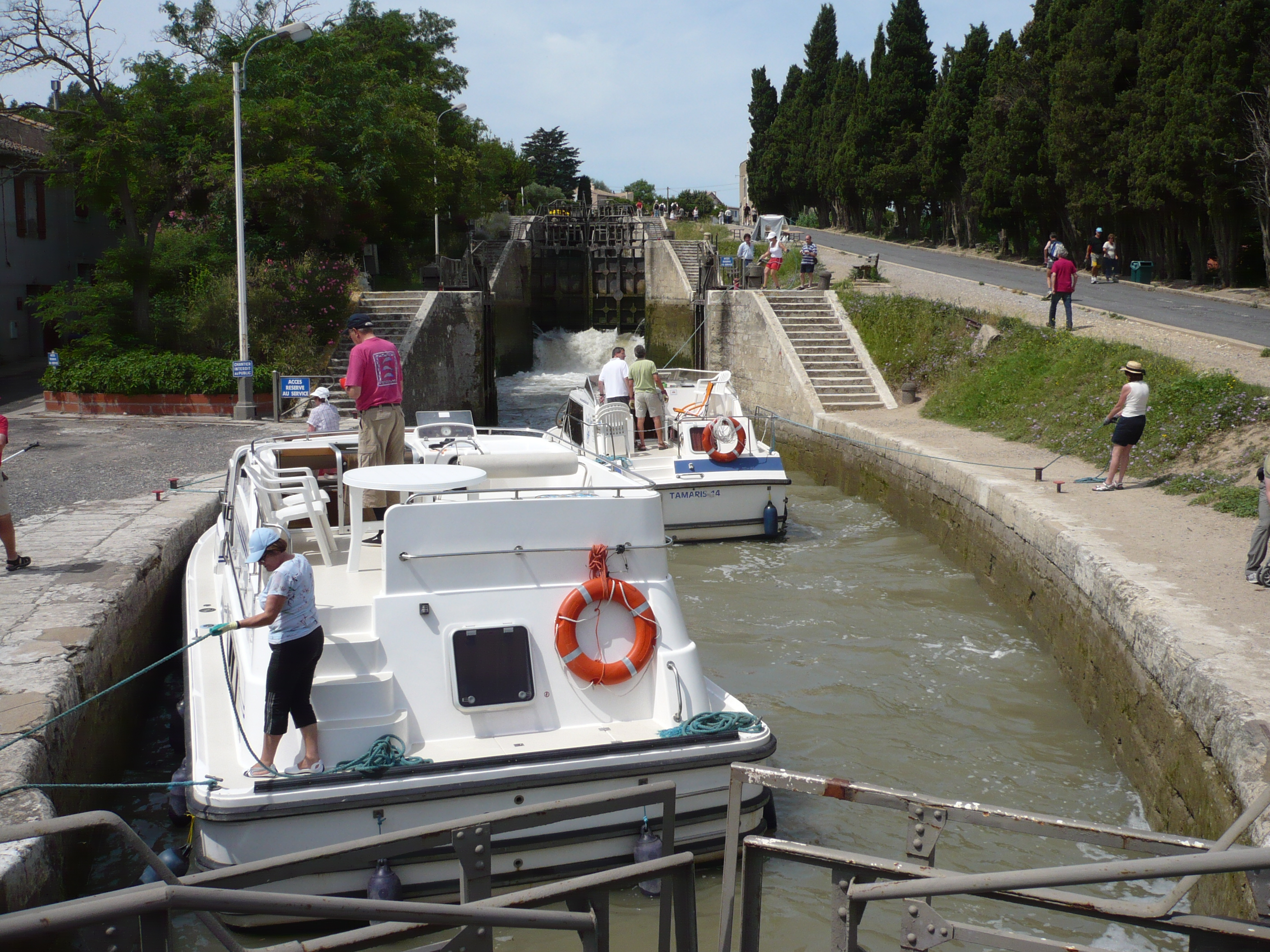
Boats passing through the locks

Fonseranes Locks (French: écluses de Fonseranes, les neuf écluses) are a flight of staircase locks on the Canal du Midi near Béziers.

They consist of eight oval-shaped lock chambers, characteristic of the Canal du Midi, and nine gates, which allow boats to be raised a height of 21.5 metres (71 ft) over a distance of 300 metres (980 ft). The flight was originally built as an eight-rise, which together with the ninth lock (the écluse de Notre-Dame, 710 metres (0.44 mi) to the northeast) allowed boats to cross the Orb river on a level and re-enter the canal further downstream. The "nine locks" name dates from this time.

Diagram of the locks and gates, showing the numbering of the chambers and the six in use at the present day.

However, in 1858 an aqueduct was built to replace the crossing of the Orb. Boats now enter and leave the lower end of the flight through the side of chamber seven, which is permanently kept at its upper water level. The flight is therefore effectively made up of six locks. The lower gates of the seventh chamber are now permanently closed; the eighth chamber and the ninth lock, the pre-1858 route descending to the Orb, are disused.

This side exit from chamber seven causes some confusion in describing the flight of locks. While most sources now ignore the disused eighth chamber, some still describe the flight as a seven-rise, despite chamber seven being permanently at the lower canal level.

In 1983 the Fonseranes inclined plane was built adjacent to the locks, to allow commercial traffic and boats too large for the locks to bypass them. Unfortunately the project encountered technical problems, and after many years of attempting to solve them the inclined plane was abandoned in 2001.

Traditional buildings such as the stables and the lock keeper's house still remain. These and the locks themselves have made the site the third most popular tourist destination in Languedoc-Roussillon, after the Pont du Gard and the town of Carcassonne.

Though Pierre-Paul Riquet rightly receives much credit and acknowledgement for the creation of the Canal du Midi, we may forget that many individual parts of the canal were built by subcontractors other than Riquet. The subcontractors for these locks were two illiterate brothers, Michel and Pierre Medailhes. Many of the workers were women.

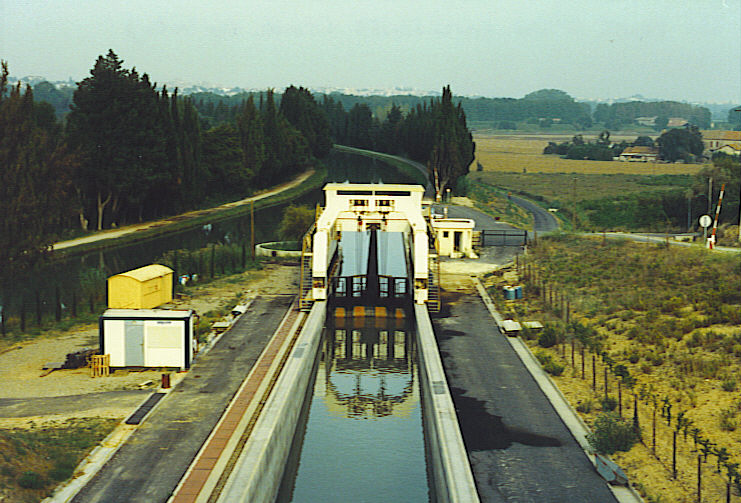
Fonseranes water slope.

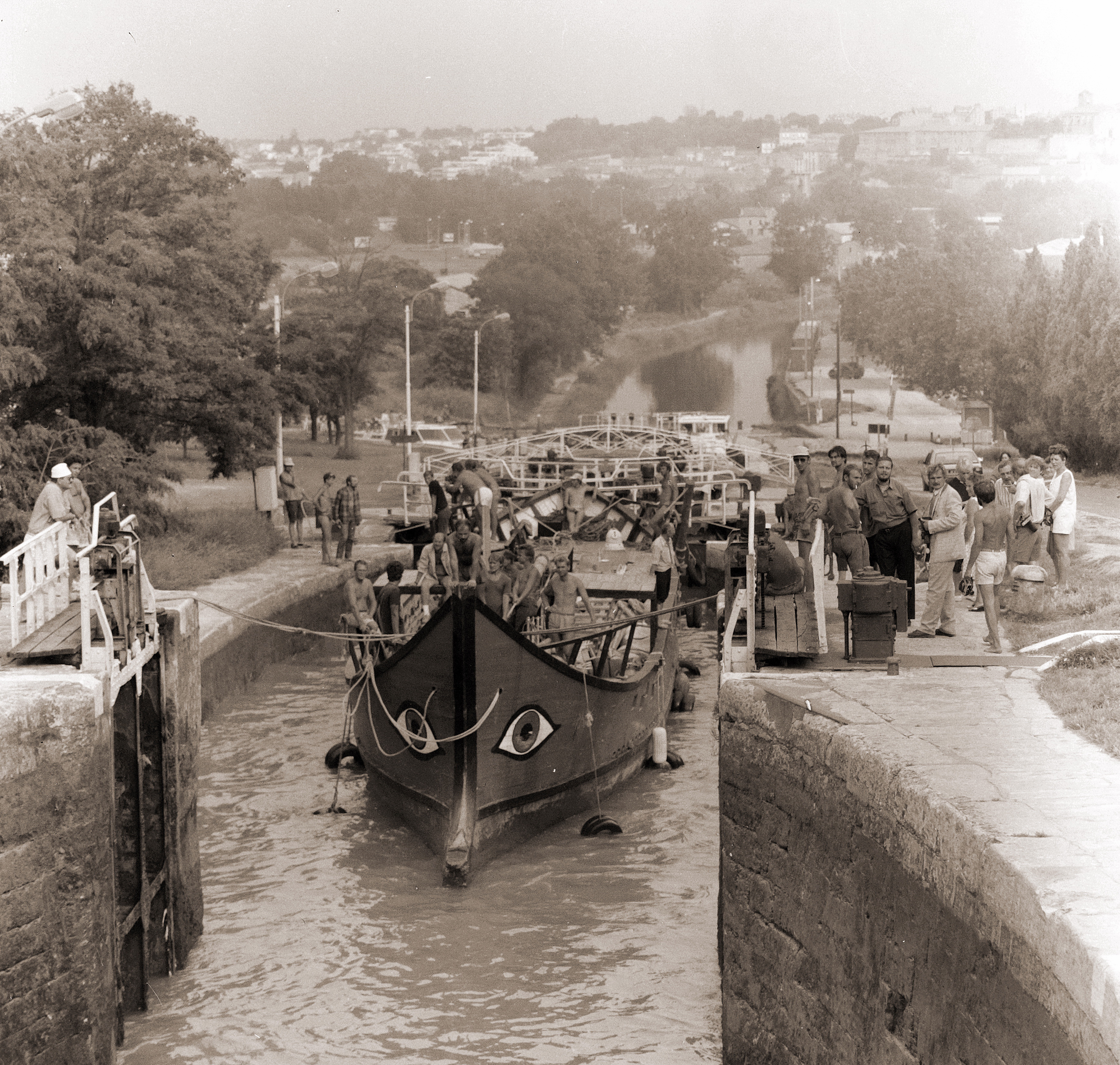
Modern reconstruction of an ancient Greek rowing warship Ivlia leaves the Fonseranes Locks. 1992.

== See also ==
- Locks on the Canal du Midi
