= Orb Aqueduct =

Aqueduct carrying the Canal du Midi

Orb Aqueduct Pont-canal de l'Orb, Pont-canal de Béziers
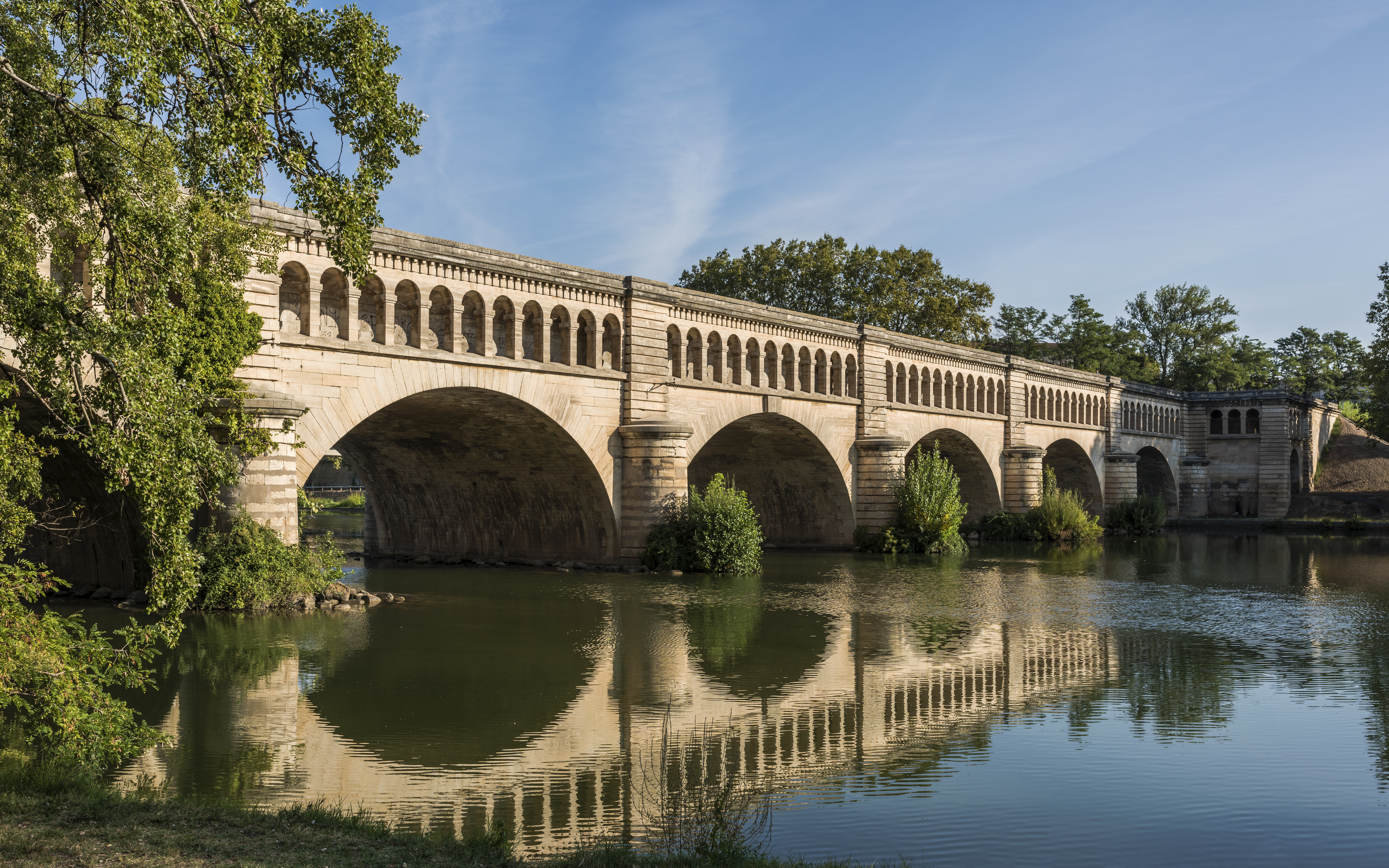
- The Orb Aqueduct in 2016
- Coordinates: 43°20′04″N 03°12′46″E
- Carries: Canal du Midi
- Crosses: River Orb

Characteristics
- Trough construction: Stone, concrete
- Pier construction: Stone
- Total length: 240 m (790 ft)
- Width: 28 m (92 ft)
- Height: 12 m (39 ft)
- Traversable?: Yes
- Towpaths: Both sides
- No. of spans: 7

History
- Designer: M. Magues
- Construction end: May, 1856
- Opened: 1858

Location
- Interactive map of Orb Aqueduct

The Orb Aqueduct (French: Pont-canal de l'Orb, Pont-canal de Béziers) is a bridge which carries the Canal du Midi over the Orb in the city of Béziers in Languedoc, France. The aqueduct is 28 metres (92 ft) wide, 12 metres (39 ft) tall and at 240 metres (790 ft) is the longest on the Canal du Midi.

Prior to the opening of the aqueduct in 1858, the Canal du Midi traversed a short section of the Orb itself. The opening of the aqueduct allowed boats to avoid the river, which was unpredictable and sometimes dangerous, and often caused extended delays. For example, in 1779 exceptional floods caused the river section to be impassable for seventeen days. Various schemes were proposed to bypass the Orb; an aqueduct of over 1 km in length was proposed in 1739 and in 1756 a plan to carry the canal in a tunnel under the Orb was put forward. However, neither proposal was implemented.

In April 1854, the Chief Engineer of the Canal Company, M. Magues, prepared designs for the present aqueduct together with new channels to take the canal from the side of the seventh and second lowest chamber of the Fonserannes Lock, across the Orb and to rejoin the original course of the Canal du Midi. The plans involved the construction of two new locks, the Orb Lock and the Béziers Lock, as well as a canal basin to the east of the Orb. Permission for the new works was granted by a decree of Emperor Napoleon III in June 1854 and the construction was completed by May 1856 and opened for use in 1858.

The aqueduct is built of stone with seven spans and carries the canal in a masonry trough sealed with a layer of concrete. There are towpaths on each side of the waterway and underneath are two arcaded walkways. The walkways are now not accessible except for maintenance. The concrete seal was replaced in 1951 but otherwise the original structure is intact.

== Topography ==
The map shows Pierre-Paul Riquet's original course dropping down the Fonserannes Staircase, through the Notre Dame Lock, entering the Orb and leaving again a few hundred metres downstream. Magues' scheme created a new aqueduct cut leaving the canal from the seventh chamber of the Fonserannes staircase, and leaving the eighth chamber and the Notre Dame Lock unused. The new cut crosses the Orb on the aqueduct, drops into the new Béziers canal basin through Orb Lock and then drops to the level of the original cut through Béziers Lock.

== See also ==
- List of bridges in France
- Locks on the Canal du Midi
