= Salles-sur-l'Hers =

Commune in Occitanie, France

- Commune
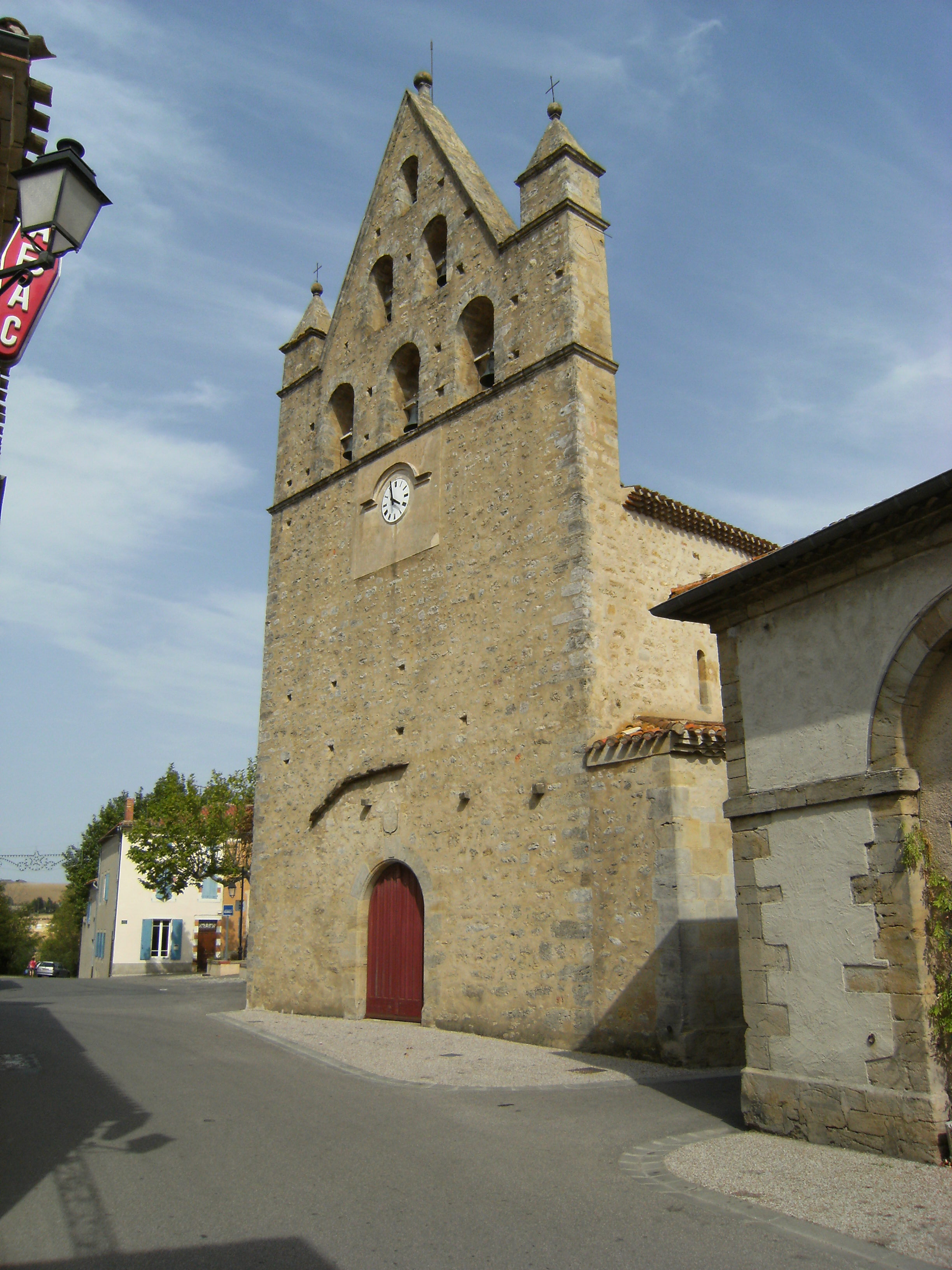
- The church in Salles-sur-l'Hers

- Coat of arms
- Location of Salles-sur-l'Hers
- Location within France Location within Occitanie
- Coordinates: 43°18′N 1°47′E
- Country: France
- Region: Occitania
- Department: Aude
- Arrondissement: Carcassonne
- Canton: La Piège au Razès

Government
  - Mayor (2020–2026): Robert Batigne
- Area^{1}: 19.31 km^{2} (7.46 sq mi)
- Elevation: 250 m (820 ft)
- Highest elevation: 335 m (1,099 ft)
- Lowest elevation: 205 m (673 ft)
- Population (2023): 770
  - Density: 40/km^{2} (100/sq mi)
- Time zone: UTC+01:00 (CET)
  - Summer (DST): UTC+02:00 (CEST)
- INSEE/Postal code: 11371 /11410
- ^{1} French Land Register data, which excludes lakes, ponds, glaciers > 1 km^{2} (0.386 sq mi or 247 acres) and river estuaries.

Salles-sur-l'Hers (French pronunciation: [sal syʁ lɛʁs], literally Salles on the Hers; Occitan: Salas d'Èrs) is a commune in the Aude department in southern France.

== Population ==
Historical population
Year	Pop.	±% p.a.
1968	538	—
1975	528	−0.27%
1982	528	+0.00%
1990	476	−1.29%
1999	540	+1.41%
2007	574	+0.77%
2012	655	+2.68%
2017	701	+1.37%
2023	770	+1.58%
Source: INSEE

== See also ==
- Communes of the Aude department
