= Hers-Mort =

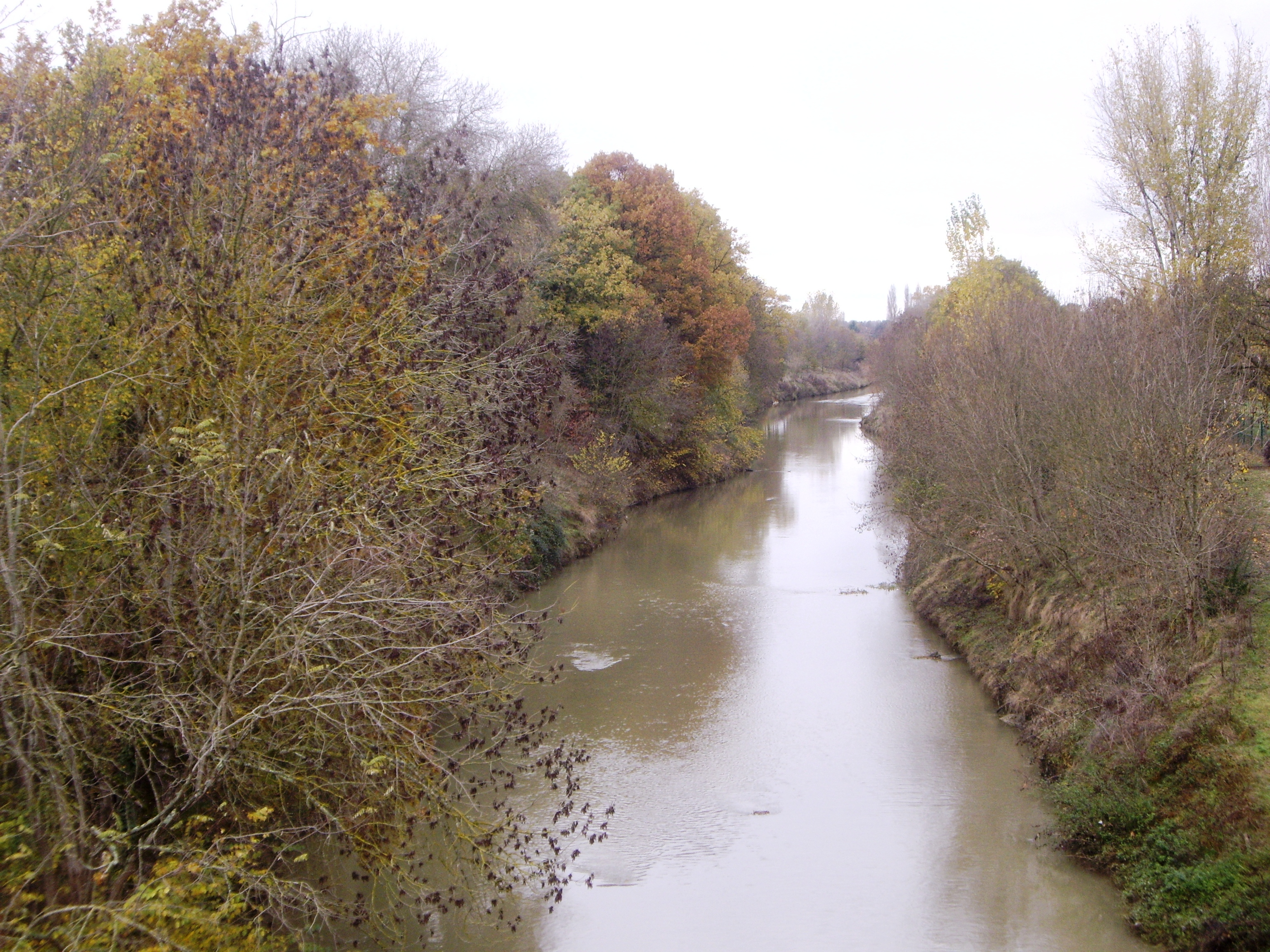

- Location within France Location within Occitanie

Location
- Country: France

Physical characteristics
- Source
  - location: Lauragais
- Mouth
  - location: Garonne
  - coordinates: 43°46′28″N 1°19′37″E
- Length: 89 km (55 mi)
- Discharge
  - average: 4 m^{3}/s (140 cu ft/s)

Basin features
- Progression: Garonne→ Gironde estuary→ Atlantic Ocean

The Hers-Mort (French pronunciation: [ɛʁs mɔʁ]; Occitan: Èrs Mòrt; the "Dead Hers", as opposed to the faster-flowing Hers-Vif, or "Live Hers") is a 89.3-kilometre (55.5 mi) long river in southern France, (Note: The river was an important feature during the Battle of Toulouse (1814), contemporary British sources and many secondary sources derived from those contemporary sources, refer to this river as the Ers (Wellington 2010, pp. 425–426; Fremont-Barnes 2006, p. 995).) a right-bank tributary of the Garonne. Its average flow rate is 4 cubic metres per second (140 cu ft/s). The Hers-Mort rises in the Lauragais region, near the village Fonters-du-Razès, in the Aude department. It flows northwest through the following departments and towns:

- Aude: Payra-sur-l'Hers, Salles-sur-l'Hers
- Haute-Garonne: Villefranche-de-Lauragais, Baziège, Toulouse, Saint-Jory

It flows into the Garonne near Grenade-sur-Garonne. Its waters, augmented by the Girou which flows into its right bank, irrigate the market gardens around Toulouse. The Canal du Midi crosses the Hers-Mort near Villefranche-de-Lauragais via the Hers Aqueduct.
