= Montech water slope =

Boat lift in France

Coordinates: 43°58′13″N 1°13′39″E

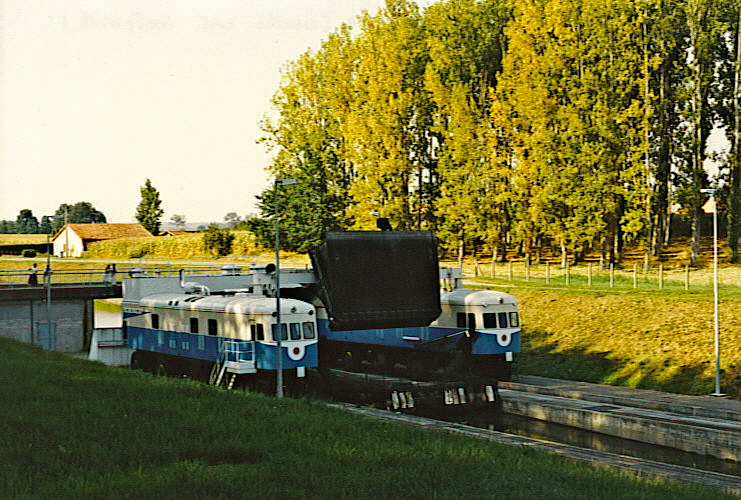
The Montech water slope; movable gate raised

The Montech water slope is a type of canal inclined plane built on the Canal de Garonne, in the commune of Montech, Tarn-et-Garonne, Southwest France. It is managed by the publicly owned Voies navigables de France and by-passes a series of five locks. The slope is used for larger vessels up to 40 metres in length, while smaller boats continue to use the locks.

The slope has been out of service since an engine failure in 2009, and was scheduled to reopen in the summer of 2020 but in 2023 was still not working.

== Operating principles ==
The principle of the water slope is based on a sloping channel up or down which a wedge of water retained by an (almost) watertight gate is moved. This technique was invented in the 19th century by the German engineer Julius Greve and described by the French engineer Jean Aubert in 1961. The Montech water slope was inaugurated in July 1974.

An evenly sloping concrete channel is fitted with a gate at the top, around which a continuous trickle of water is allowed to flow, to compensate for any leakage. The lower gate, which can be lifted, is mounted on a yoke between two ex-railway locomotives, which run on concrete tracks either side of the channel.

To allow a boat to ascend, the lower gate is lifted, the boat enters the channel, and then the gate is lowered behind it, leaving it floating on an isolated wedge of water. The locomotives ascend the slope, pushing the water wedge in front of the lower gate. When the water level in the wedge matches that of the upper canal, the upper gate is opened and the boat is allowed to float free. To descend the process is reversed.

== Details of the machinery ==
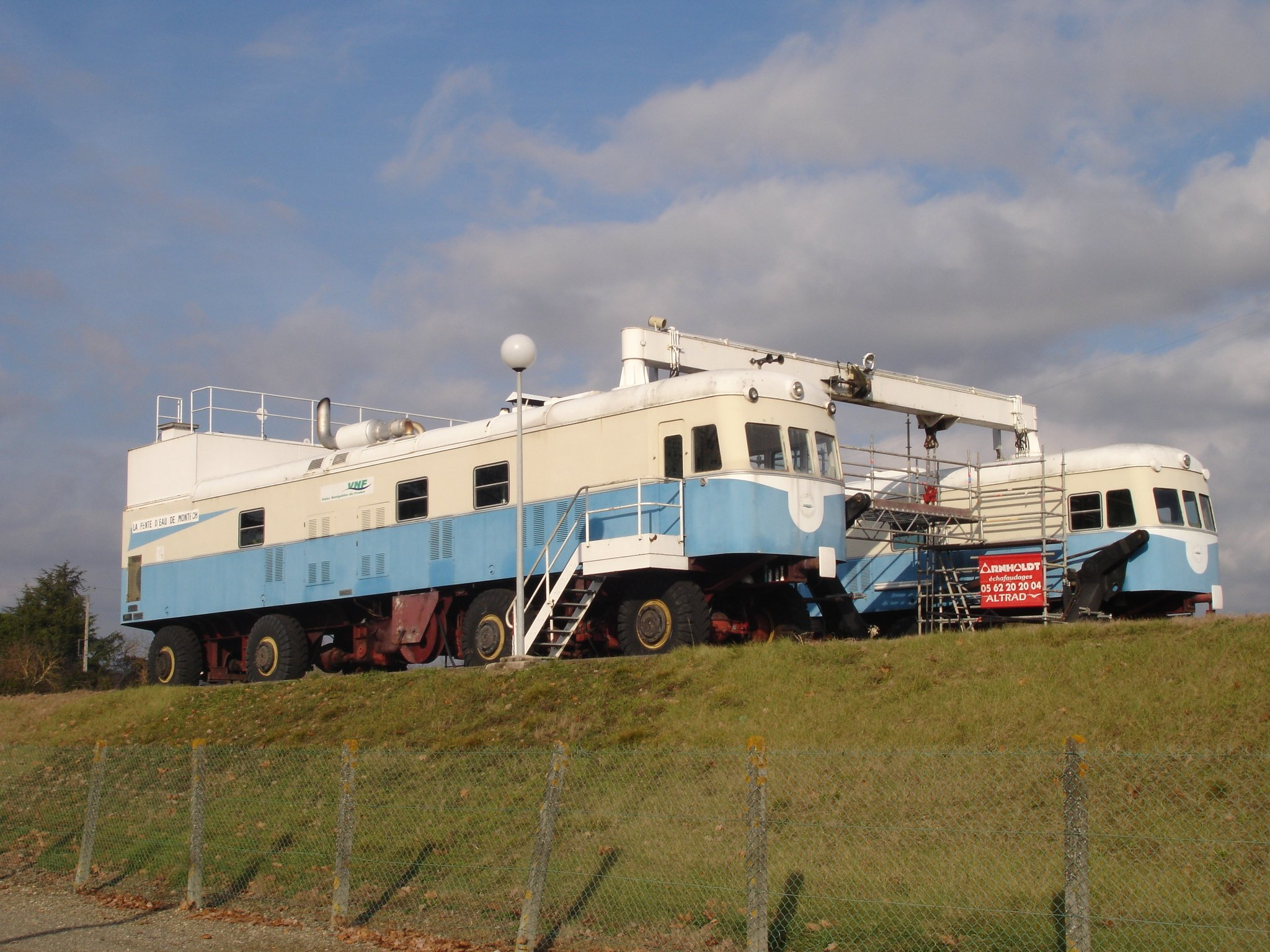
Montech water slope railway locomotives

By virtue of its power and ingenuity the slope's mobile barrier is the key to the system. It consists of:

- Two locomotives, rigidly connected together by a cross-piece which spans the channel, with the locomotives travelling on the channel's banks.
- The gate, which acts as a big slide-valve, connected to the rigid cross-member by an arm.
- A horizontal beam serving as a shock absorber between the boats and the gate.

Each diesel electric locomotive has a power of 750 kilowatts (1,000 hp) distributed to drive motors on each of the four axles, each with two large pneumatic tyres.

The three contact faces of the gate with the channel are equipped with seals to keep the wedge of water in place. The gate is raised or lowered using a hydraulic ram.

The shock absorber is a hydraulically levelled hinged metal frame. It allows boats to be connected to the gate during ascents and descents. An electronic system keeps motion gentle and smooth. Finally triple brakes slow the system without jerks.

== Design features ==
- Weight of the engines: 200 tonnes
- Pushing effort: 60 tonnes
- Speed: 4.5 km/h
- Volume of water moved: 1,500 m^{3}
- Slope of the channel: 3%
- Height of the slope: 13.30 m
- Depth of water wedge moved: 3.75 m
- Length of the water wedge: 125 metres
- Power of the locomotives: 2 × 750 kW (1,000 hp)
- Length of the channel: 443 m
- Width of the channel: 6 m
- Duration of passage: about 6 minutes
- Length, width and capacity of the boats: 38.5 m, 5.5 m and 250 tonnes.

== Publicity ==
The Montech water slope was featured in an episode of the 2005 BBC television series Rick Stein's French Odyssey.

Shown as a segment of "Mysteries of the Abandoned" (2018) S2:E7 - Amazon Ghost Town Science Channel

Also featured in an episode of "Abandoned Engineering" on the Yesterday channel in the UK (Series 2, episode 6).

== Gallery ==
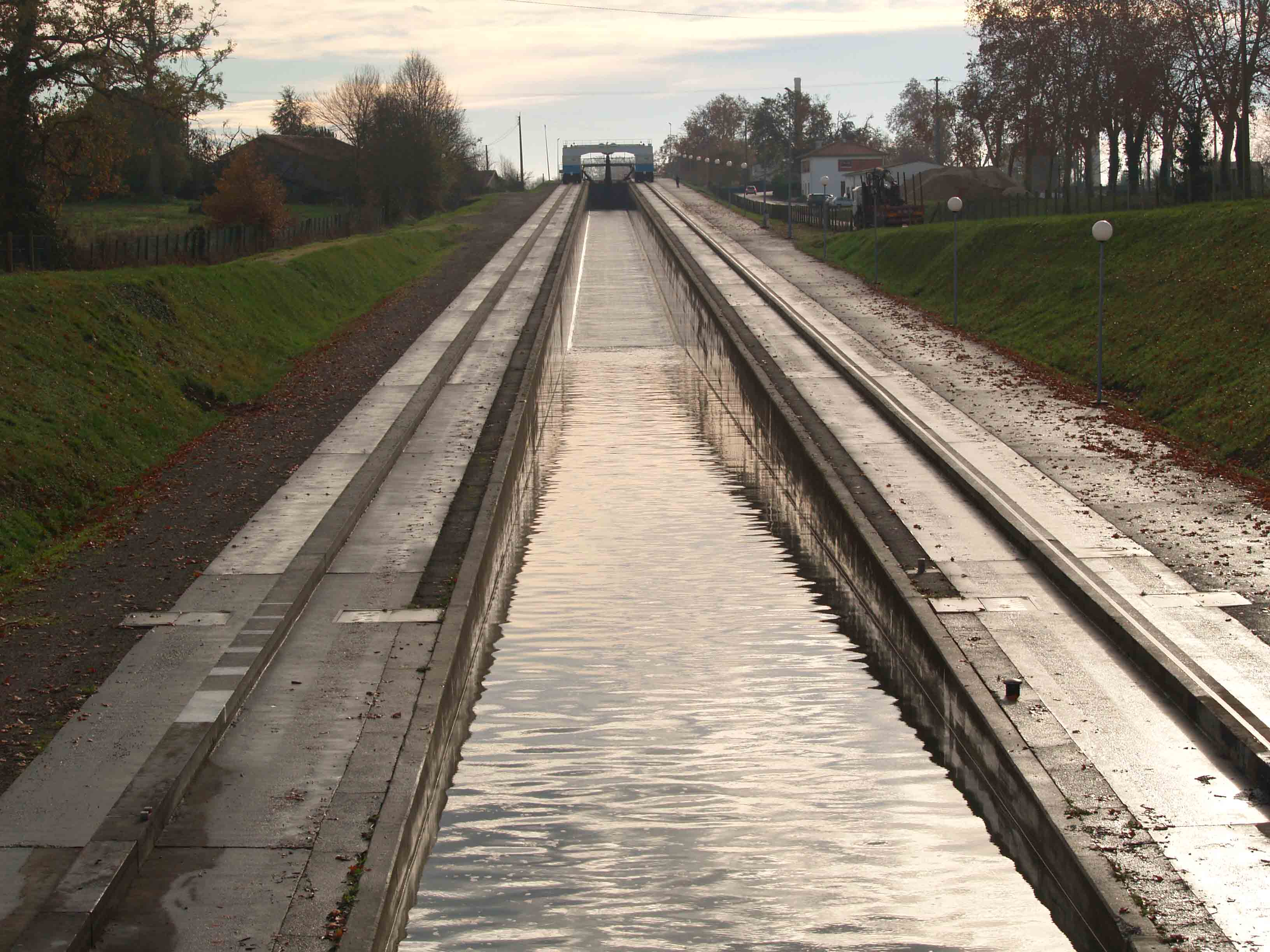
Slope seen from below; movable gate at the top of the slope

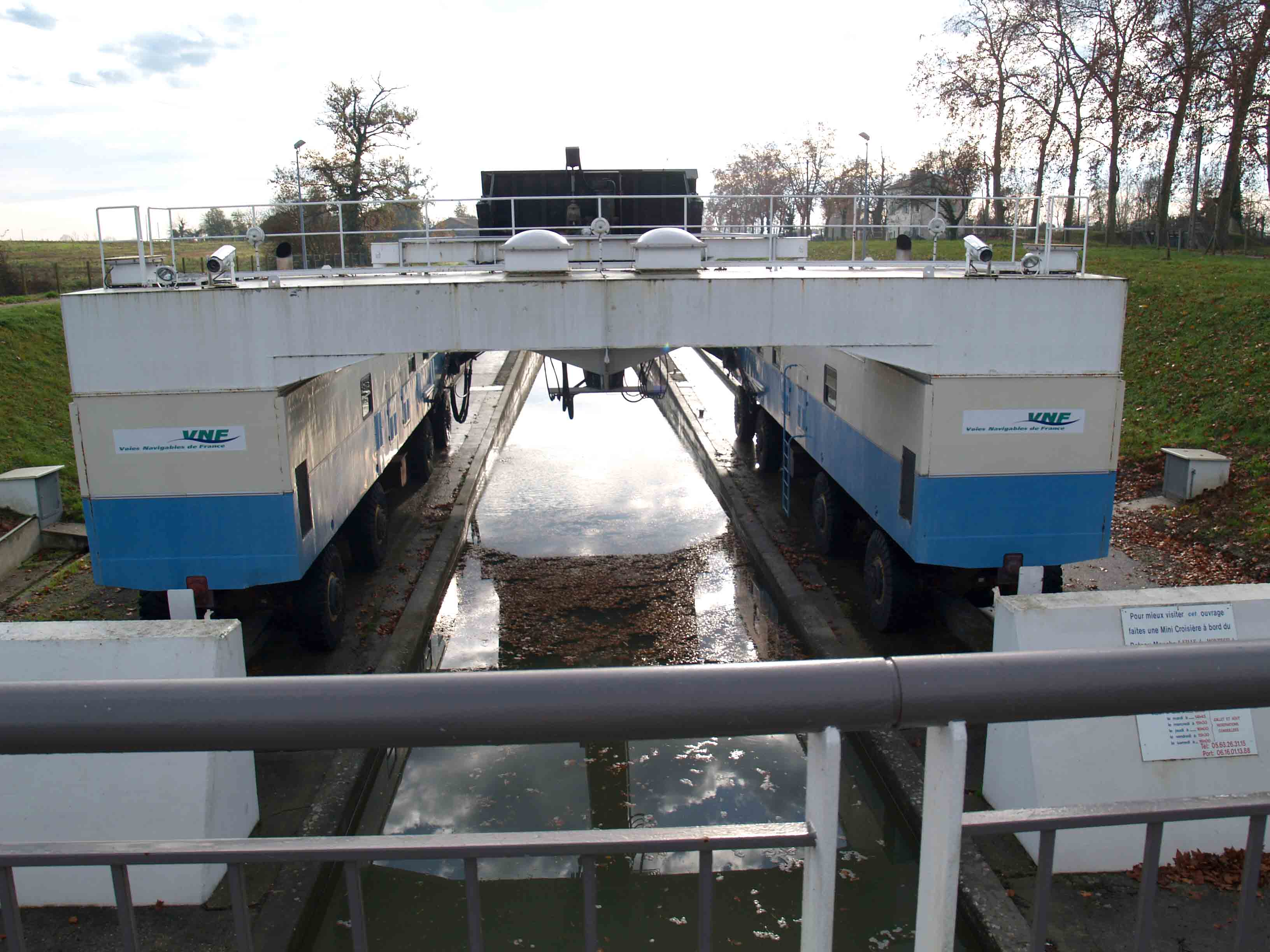
Waiting

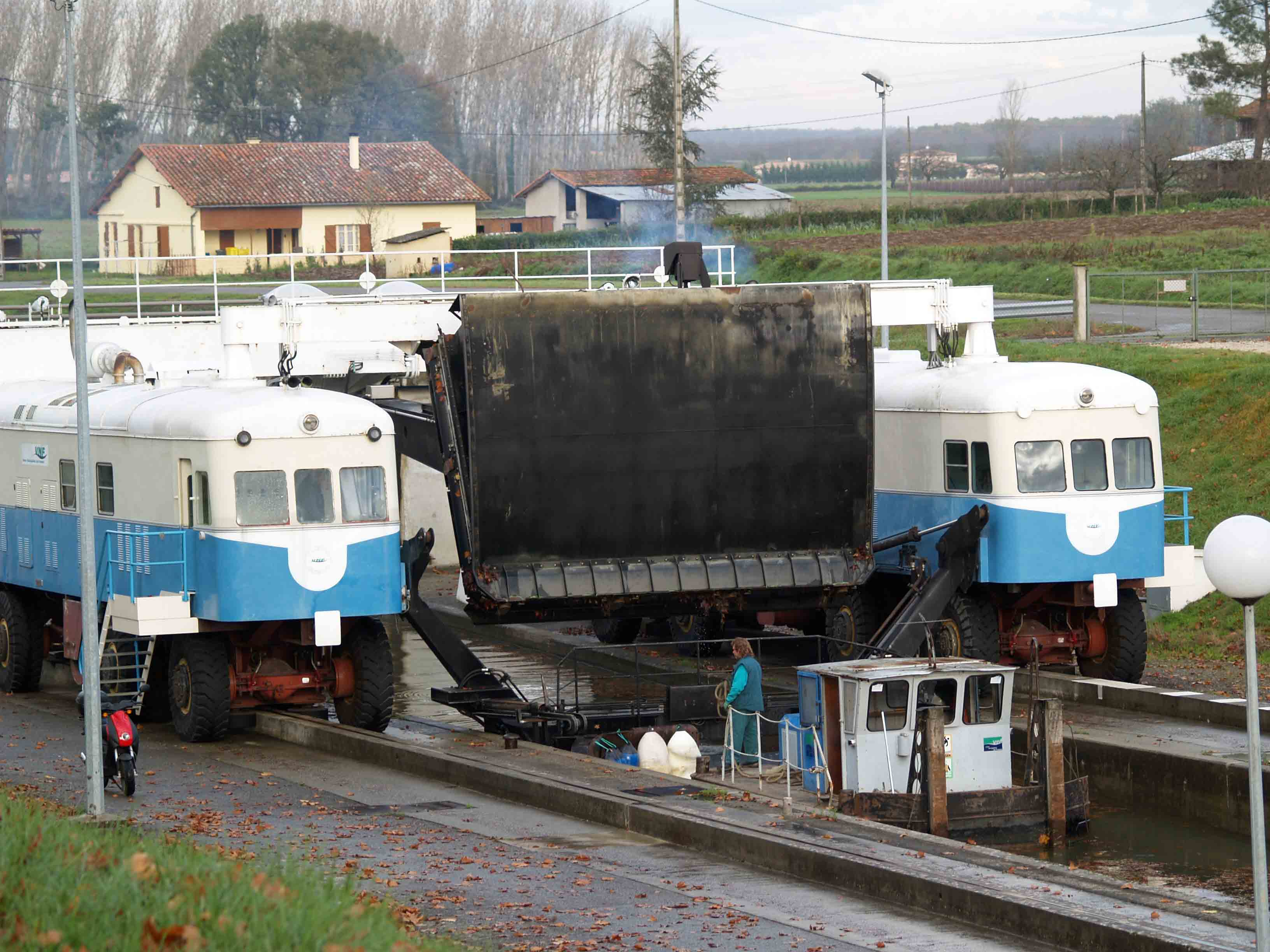
Closing the gate

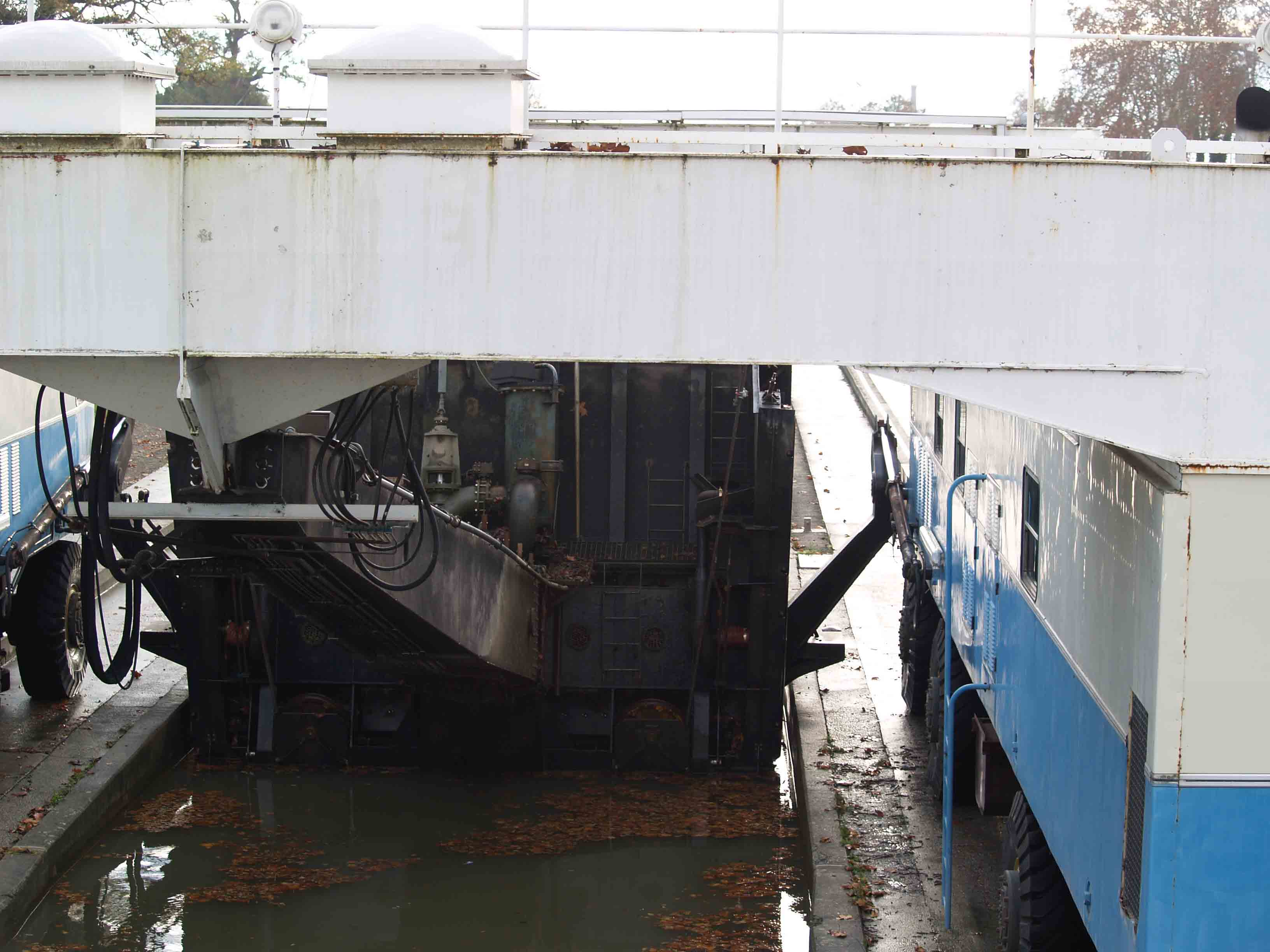
Gate closed

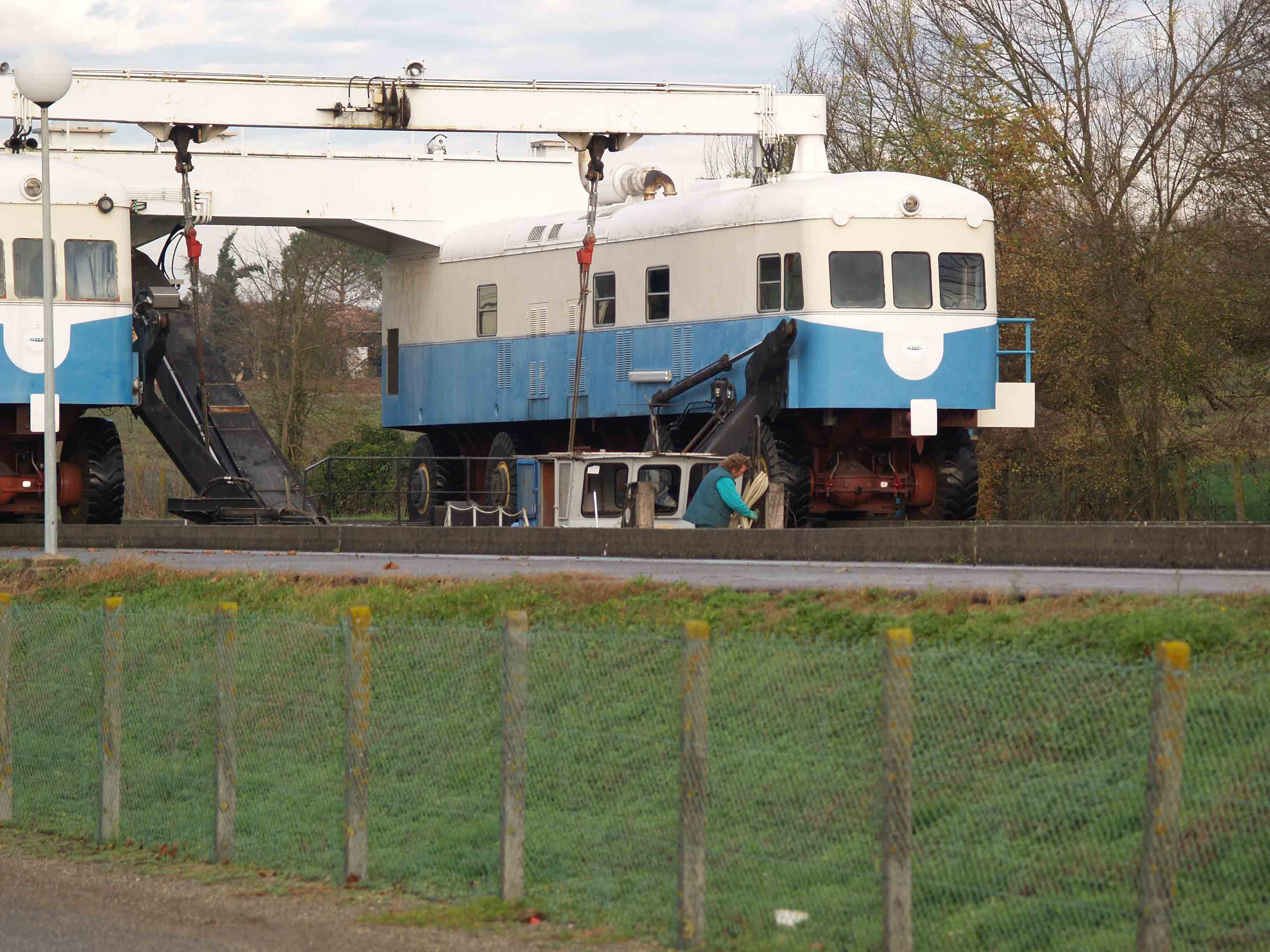
Boat ascending

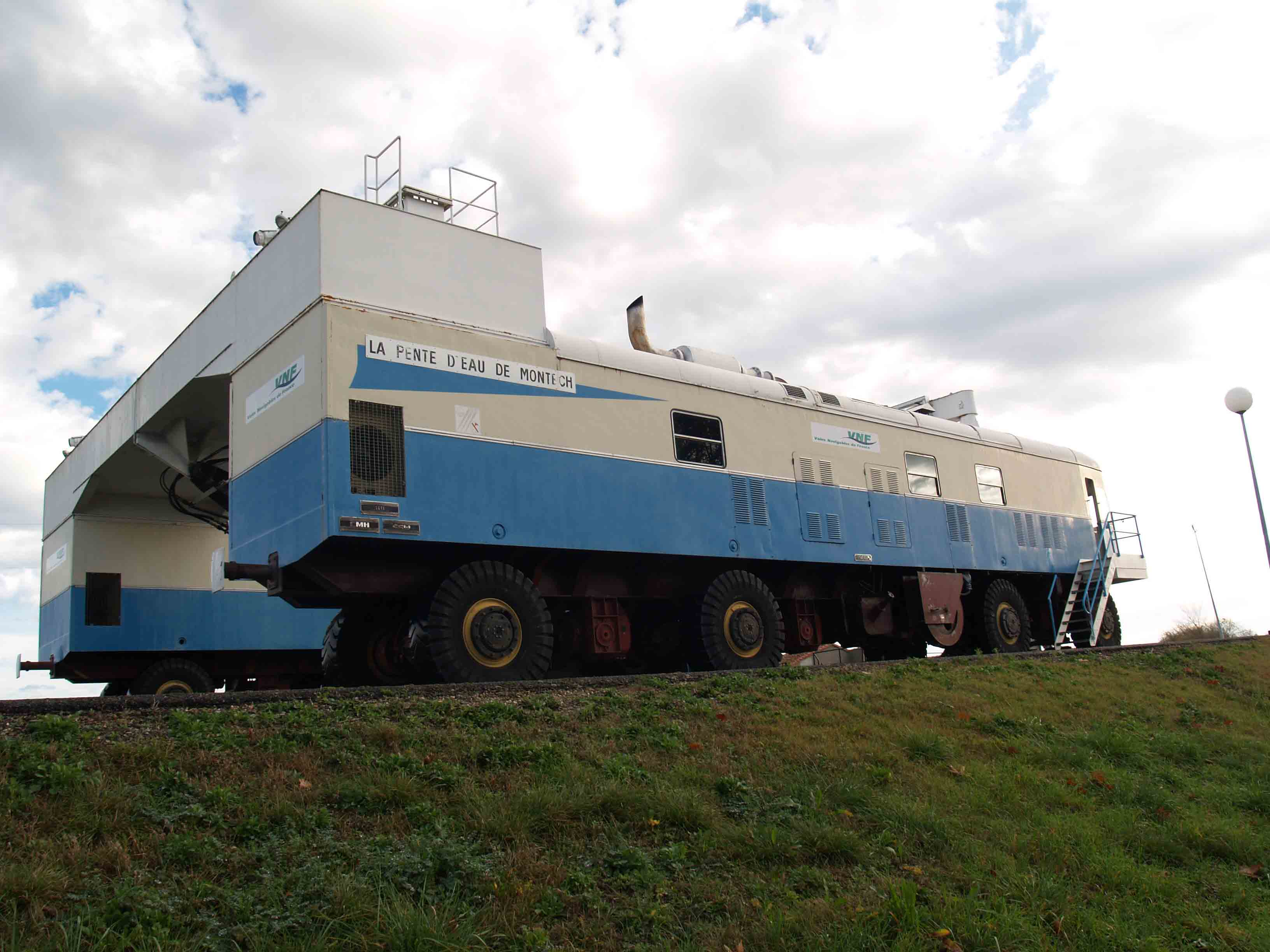
Engines seen from the side

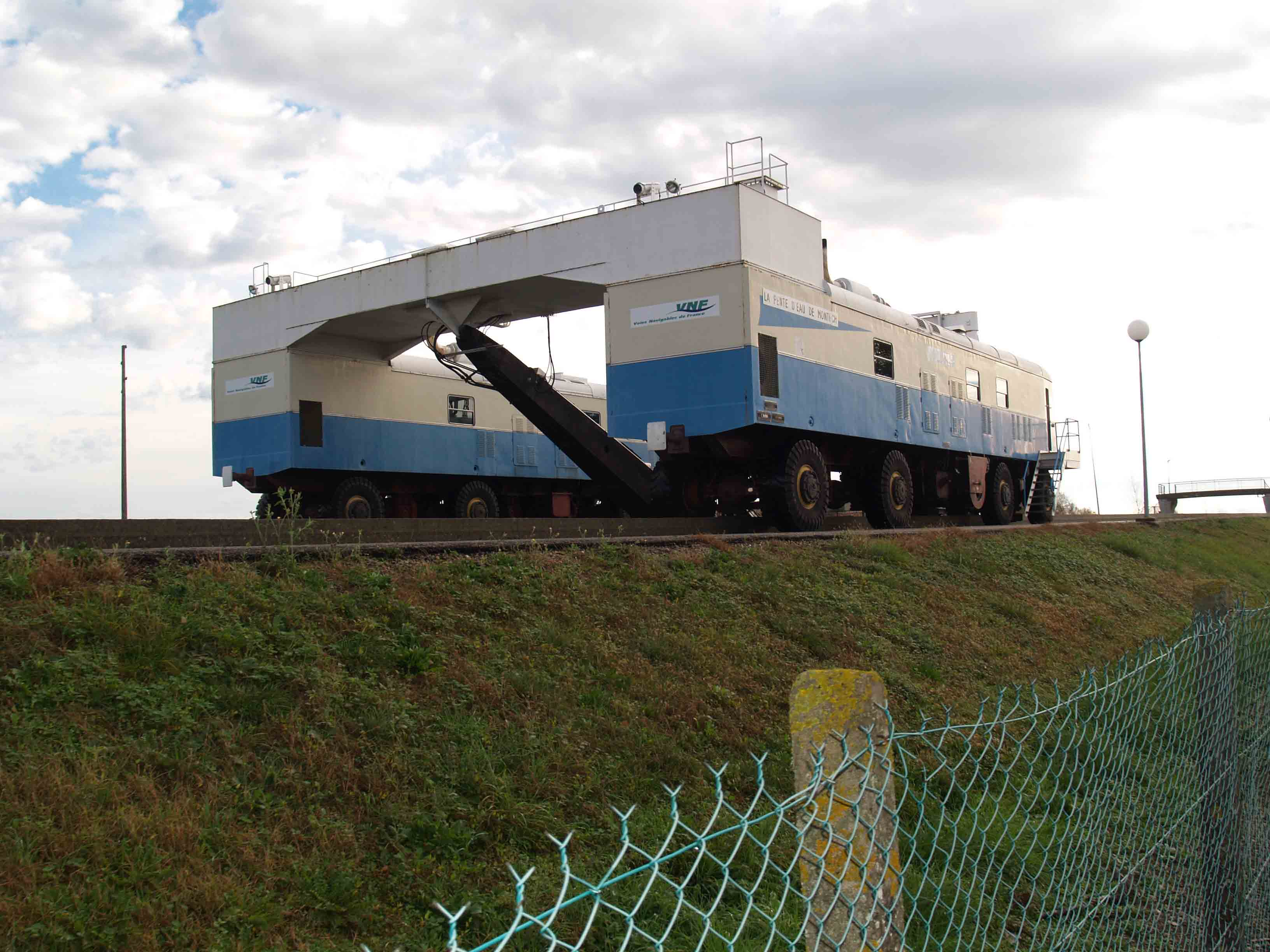
Engines seen from below/ from downstream

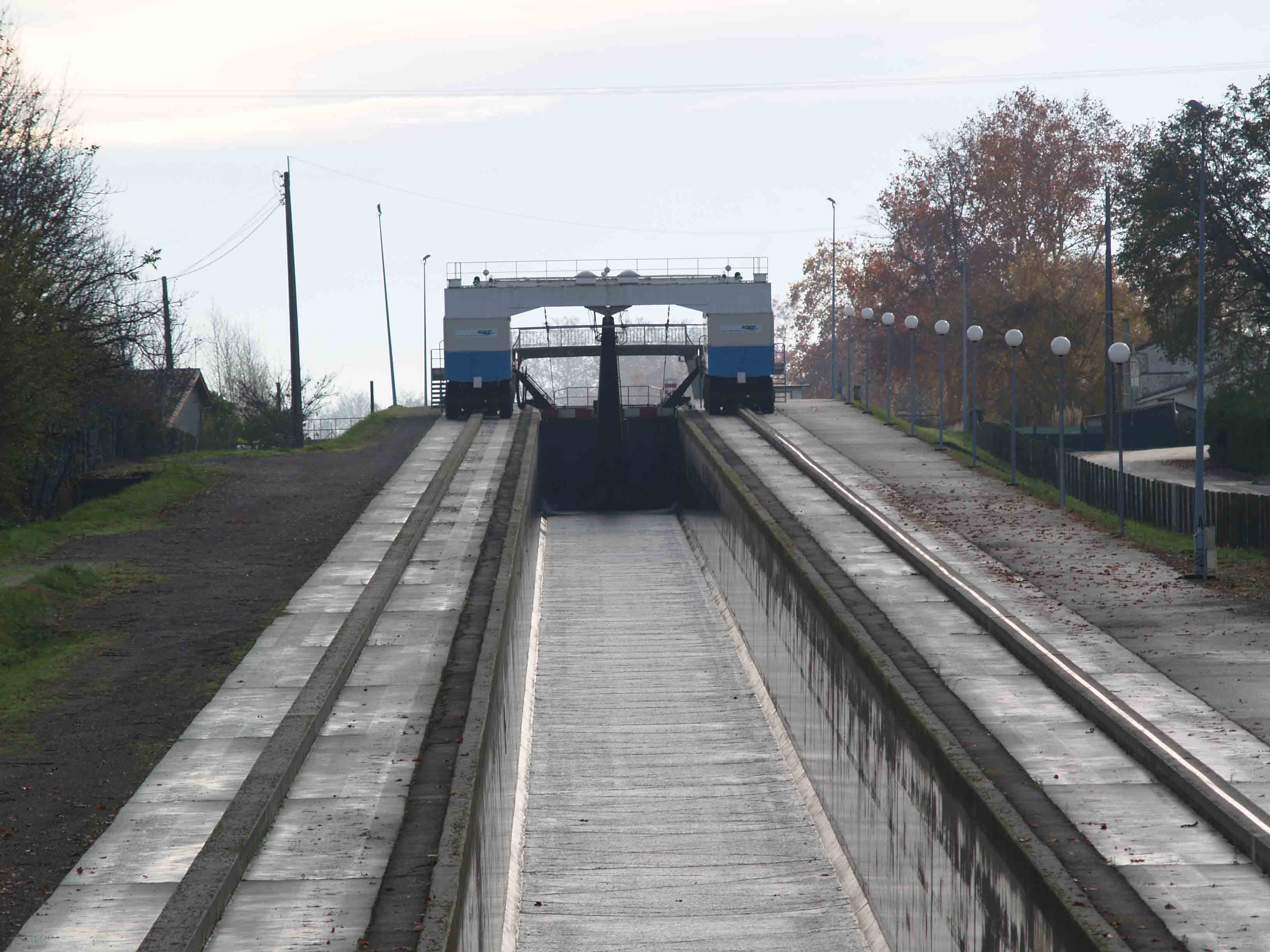
Engines and movable gate at the top of the slope

== See also ==
- Fonserannes water slope
- Garonne
- Canal du Midi
