= Fonseranes Water Slope =

Former canal elevator

Coordinates: 43.330196°N 3.200744°E

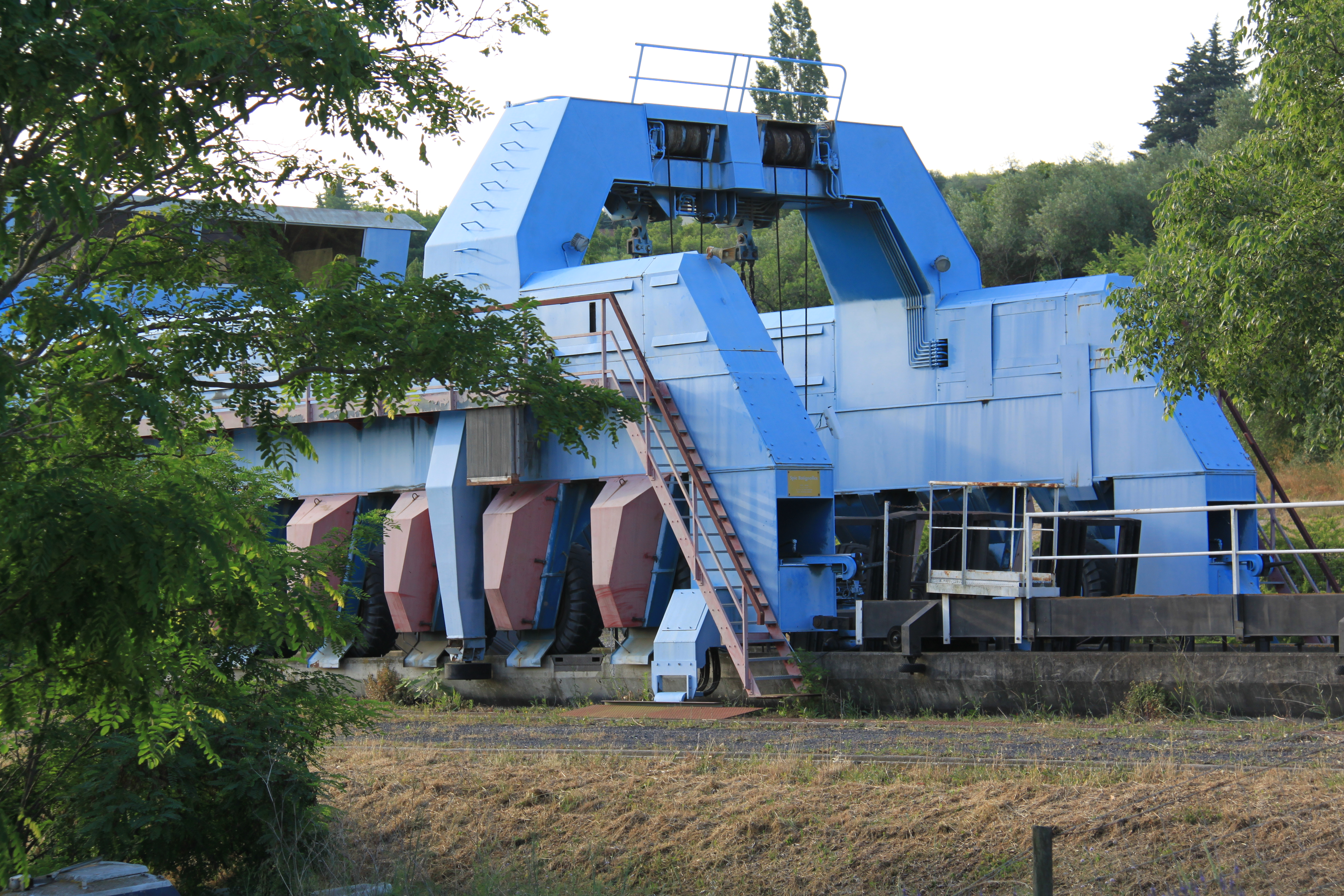
Fonséranes water slope tractor

The Fonseranes Water Slope (French: Pente d'eau Fonséranes) is a disused inclined plane on the Canal du Midi parallel to the Fonseranes Locks. It has a rise of 13.6 m (45 ft) and a slope of 5°.

This technique for a water slope was described by the French engineer Jean Aubert in 1961. It was designed to lift vessels of up to 350 tonnes displacement.

The slope, the second and last to be constructed in France, was built between 1980 and 1983 with the intent of augmenting the seven locks at the Fonseranes Locks, allowing larger boats to pass without extensive rework of the existing locks; these would continue to serve smaller boats. Trial operations commenced in May 1984. However, within weeks a number of technical problems emerged as oil leaking from the hydraulic system lubricated the concrete tracks and the wheels on the lift were unable to gain sufficient traction to raise the chamber to the top of the slope. It took until 1986 to resolve the technical, contractual, and insurance issues. This problem was never satisfactorily resolved and the slope was abandoned officially on 11 April 2001.

The first water slope in France was the Montech water slope on the Canal de Garonne in the commune of Montech.

== Gallery ==
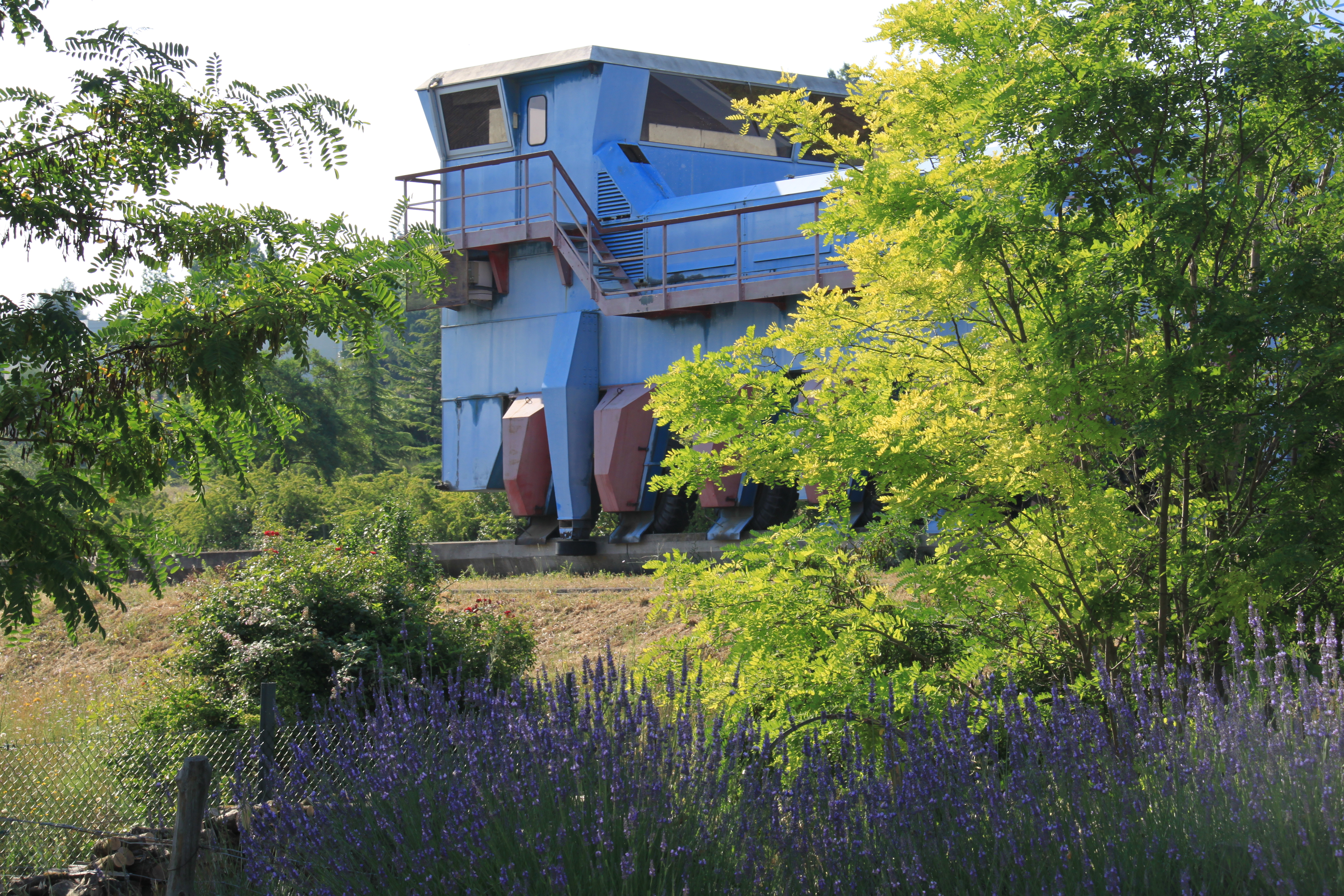
Fonseranes water slide tractor

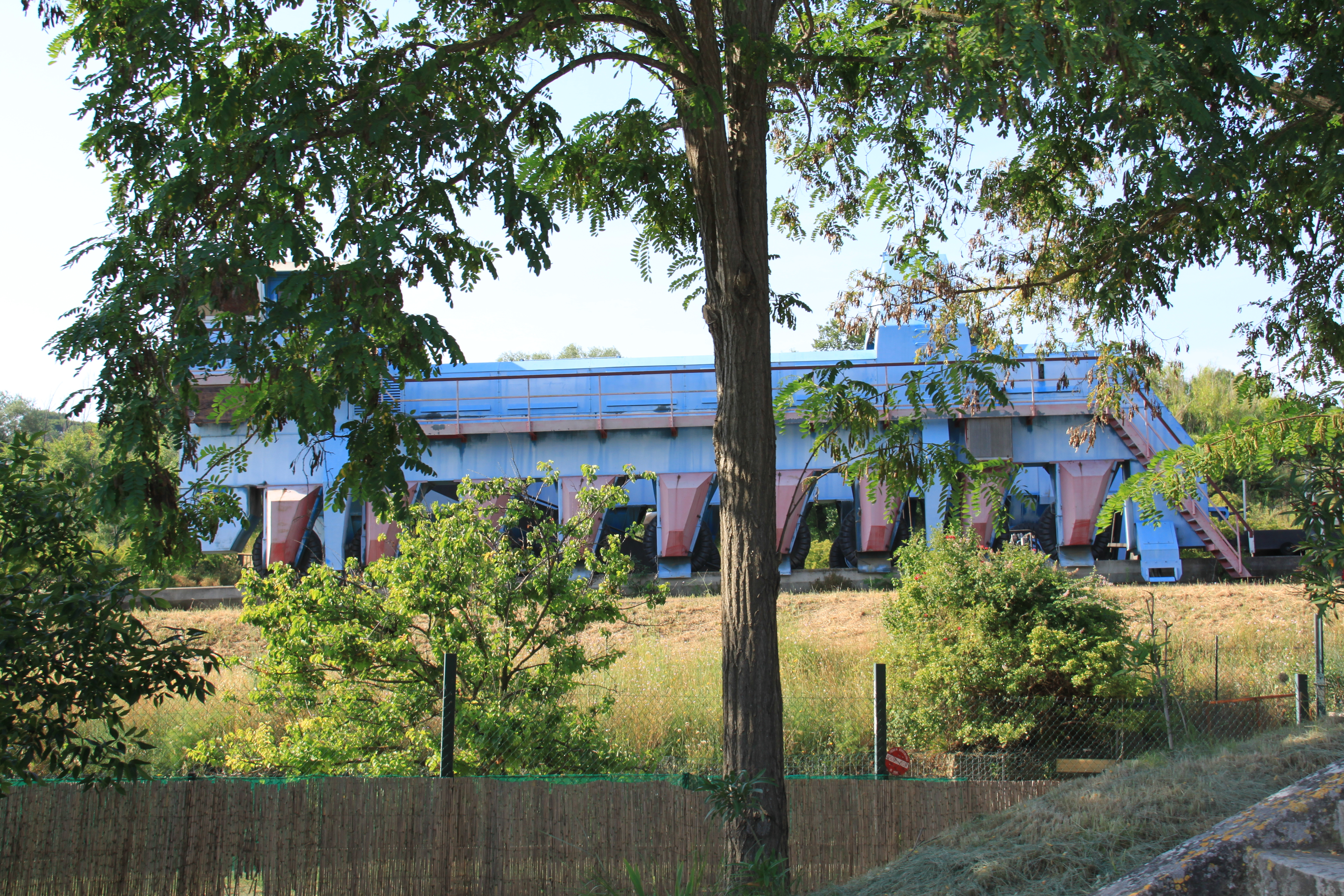
Fonseranes water slide tractor

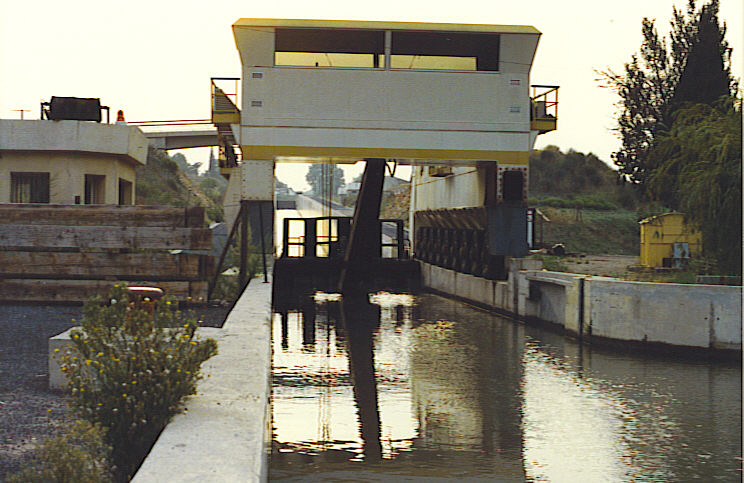
Device at its lowest point.

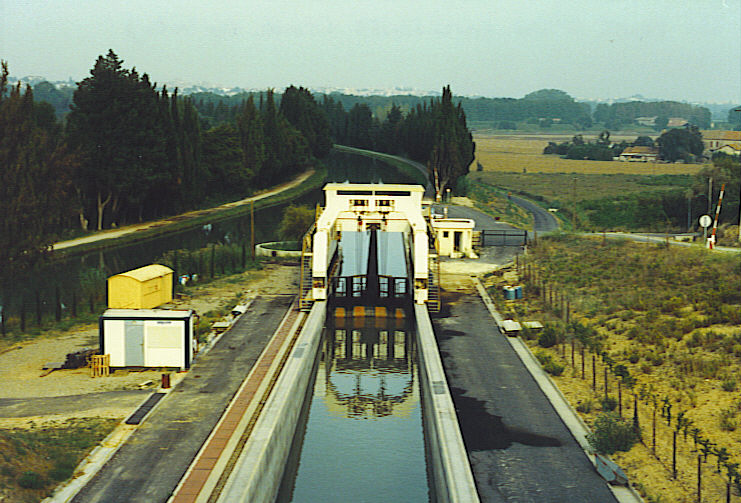

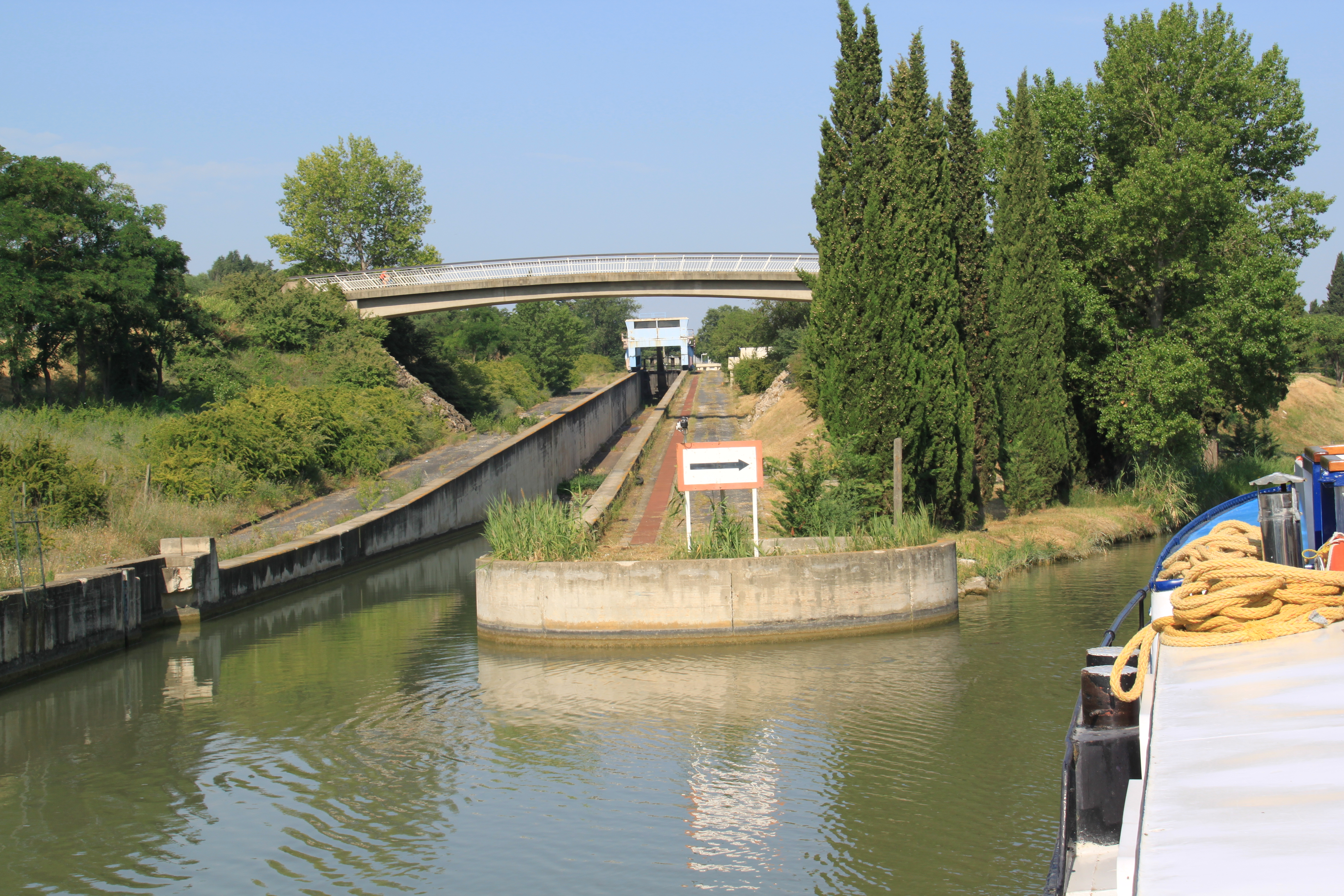
Fonseranes water slide trough

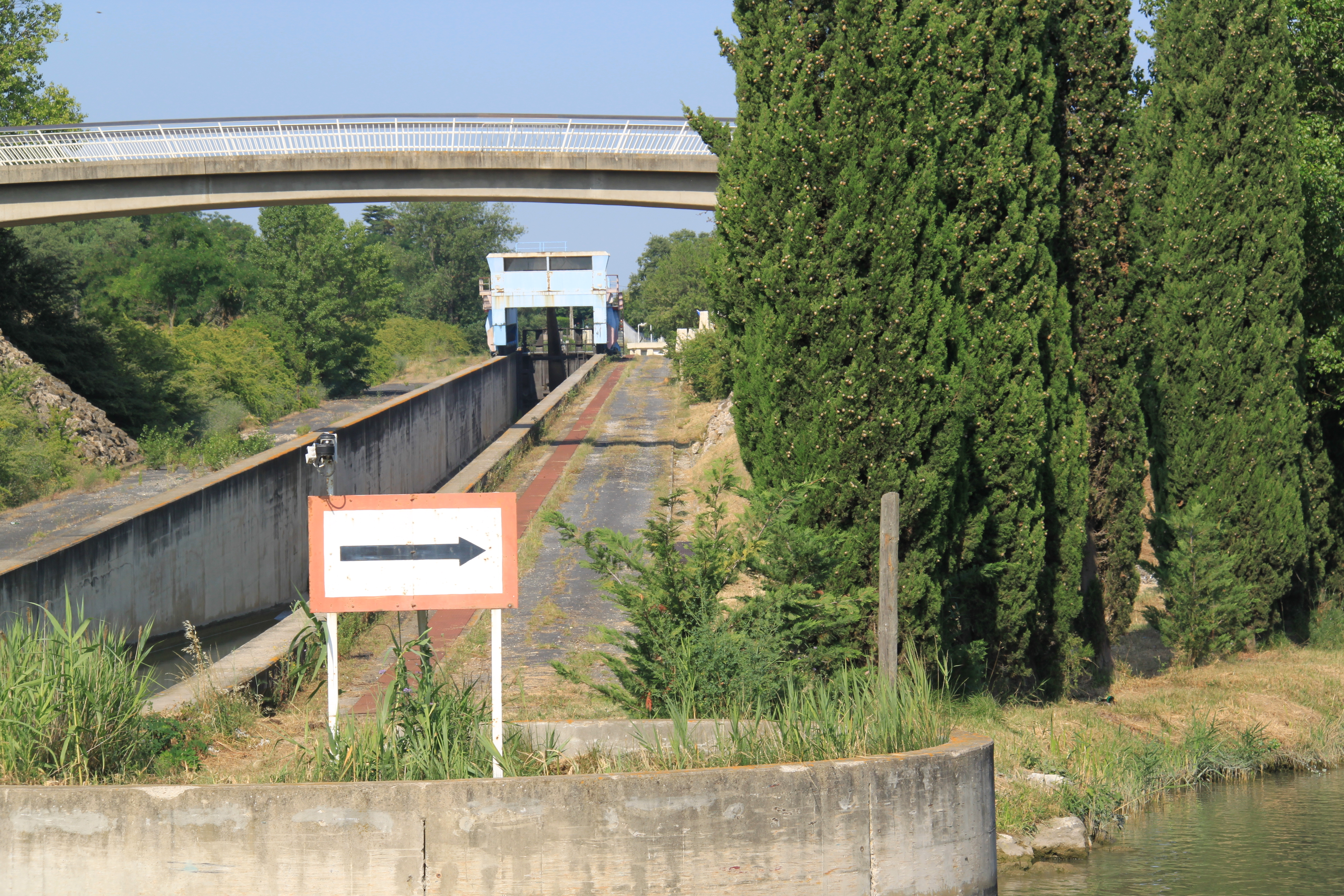
Fonseranes water slide trough
