= Hers Aqueduct =

- Coordinates: 43.3861°N 1.7088°E
- Carries: Canal du Midi
- Crosses: Hers-Mort
- Locale: near Villefranche-de-Lauragais

Characteristics
- Trough construction: Masonry
- No. of spans: 2

The Hers Aqueduct (French: Aqueduc de l'Hers, also Aqueduc des Voûtes; Occitan: Aqüeducte d'Sòu) is one of several aqueducts, or water bridges, created for the Canal du Midi. It crosses the river Hers-Mort near the village of Renneville, south of Villefranche-de-Lauragais. The structure was first built in 1688–1690, but the present structure is the result of modifications by Jean-Polycarpe Maguès in 1806, chief engineer on the Canal du Midi. It has been listed since 1998 as a monument historique by the French Ministry of Culture.

== See also ==
- Aqueducts on the Canal du Midi
- Locks on the Canal du Midi
