= Water slope =

Coordinates: 43°19′49″N 3°12′04″E

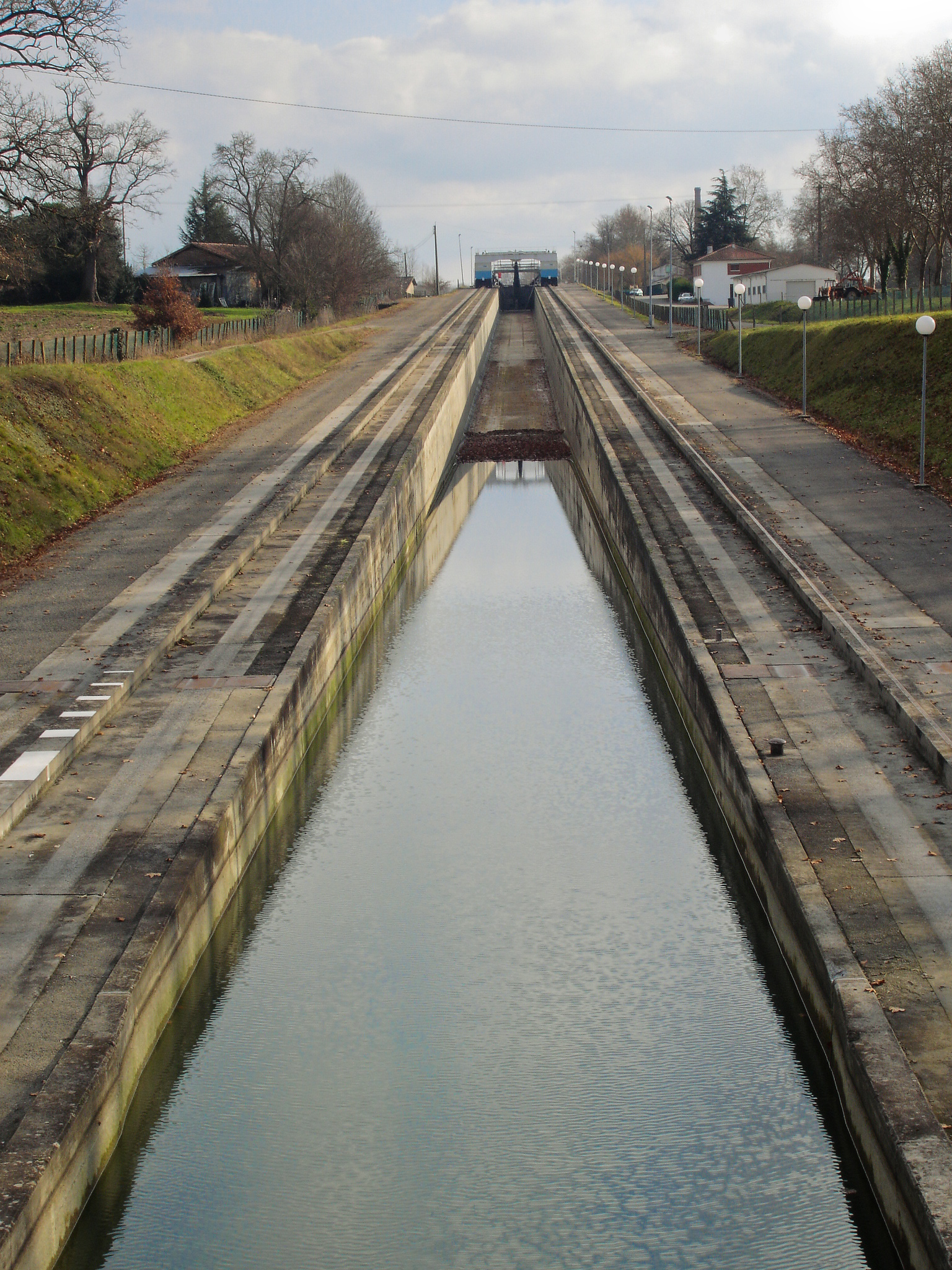
Montech Water Slope seen from below, with the moving apparatus at the top of the slope

A water slope (French: Pente d'eau) is a type of canal inclined plane built to carry boats from a canal or river at one elevation up or down to a canal or river at another elevation.

== History ==
In 1885, German engineer Julius Greve published drafts for water slopes in German journals. French engineer Jean Aubert advanced the studies in the 1950s and 1960s.

To date, only two water slopes have been built, both in southern France. In 1973 the Montech water slope (French: Pente d'eau de Montech) was put into service on the Canal latéral à la Garonne.

In 1983 the Fonserannes Water Slope was inaugurated near Béziers on the Canal du Midi. Both water slopes run parallel to existing lock flights. Both water slopes are currently out of service and in disrepair. However, the slopes and their moving engines can be viewed from a distance.

== Operation ==
The water slope uses a moveable gate in a sloping channel. To ascend the slope the moving gate can be opened to allow a boat to enter the concrete channel. The gate then closes off the bottom of the channel and seals off a wedge of water on which the boat is floating, within the channel. The moveable gate is drawn up the sloping concrete channel pushing the wedge of water before it until reaching the upper water level. When the water level in the wedge is equalised with that of the upper canal, an upper (non-moving) gate is opened and the boat is then allowed to float free.

Descending the water slope is the reverse of the ascent.

== See also ==
- Boat lift
