= Orbiel Aqueduct =

Pont-canal de l'Orbiel
- Coordinates: 43°12′52.39″N 2°26′21.51″E
- Carries: Canal du Midi
- Crosses: Orbiel River
- Locale: Trèbes

Characteristics
- Trough construction: Masonry
- Pier construction: Masonry
- No. of spans: 3

Location
- Interactive map of Pont-canal de l'Orbiel

The Orbiel Aqueduct (French: Pont-canal de l'Orbiel; Occitan: Aqüeducte d'Orbiel) is one of several aqueducts on the Canal du Midi. Until its building, the canal crossed the River Orbiel on the level. A dam on the Orbiel was demolished and replaced with the Aqueduct. It was built in 1686–87 by Antoine Niquet and designed by Marshal Sebastien Vauban, It is found in the city of Trèbes.

== See also ==
- Locks on the Canal du Midi
