= Ognon Aqueduct =

- Coordinates: 43.26958°N 2.73926°E
- Carries: Canal du Midi
- Crosses: Ognon River

The Ognon Aqueduct is one of several aqueducts on the Canal du Midi. It was built in 1826-27 to replace the troublesome level crossing of the Ognon River.

The seemingly little Ognon River which normally trickles underneath the canal can, in the event of a cloudburst in the hills, can swell to such an extent that it floods the canal. The lock keeper then has to close the floodgate preventing through navigation until the floods subside.

== See also ==
- Locks on the Canal du Midi
