= Jouarres Aqueduct =

- Coordinates: 43.26421°N 2.69633°E
- Carries: Canal du Midi
- Crosses: Unknown stream
- Locale: Jouarres le Vieux France; 9.1 km NW of Lézignan-Corbières, 22.0 km ExNE of Trèbes, 25.7 km NE of Départemente de l' Aude, 28.6 km E of Carcassonne

Characteristics
- Piers in water: 0

Location
- Interactive map of Jouarres Aqueduct

The Jouarres Aqueduct (French: Pont-canal de Jouarres) is one of several aqueducts on the Canal du Midi. A little west of Jouarres le Vieux France, it carries the canal over a small stream. It is one of three original aqueducts created by Pierre-Paul Riquet during the building of the canal from 1667 to 1681.

It is not to be confused with the Aqueduc de l'étang de Jouarres, which is some 800 m east and carries the Canal du Midi over the Ruisseau de Vidal and with the Aqueduc d'Azille, an irrigation construction from the 19th century.

== See also ==
- Locks on the Canal du Midi
- Canal du Midi
