= Argent-Double Aqueduct =

Pont-canal de l'Argent-Double
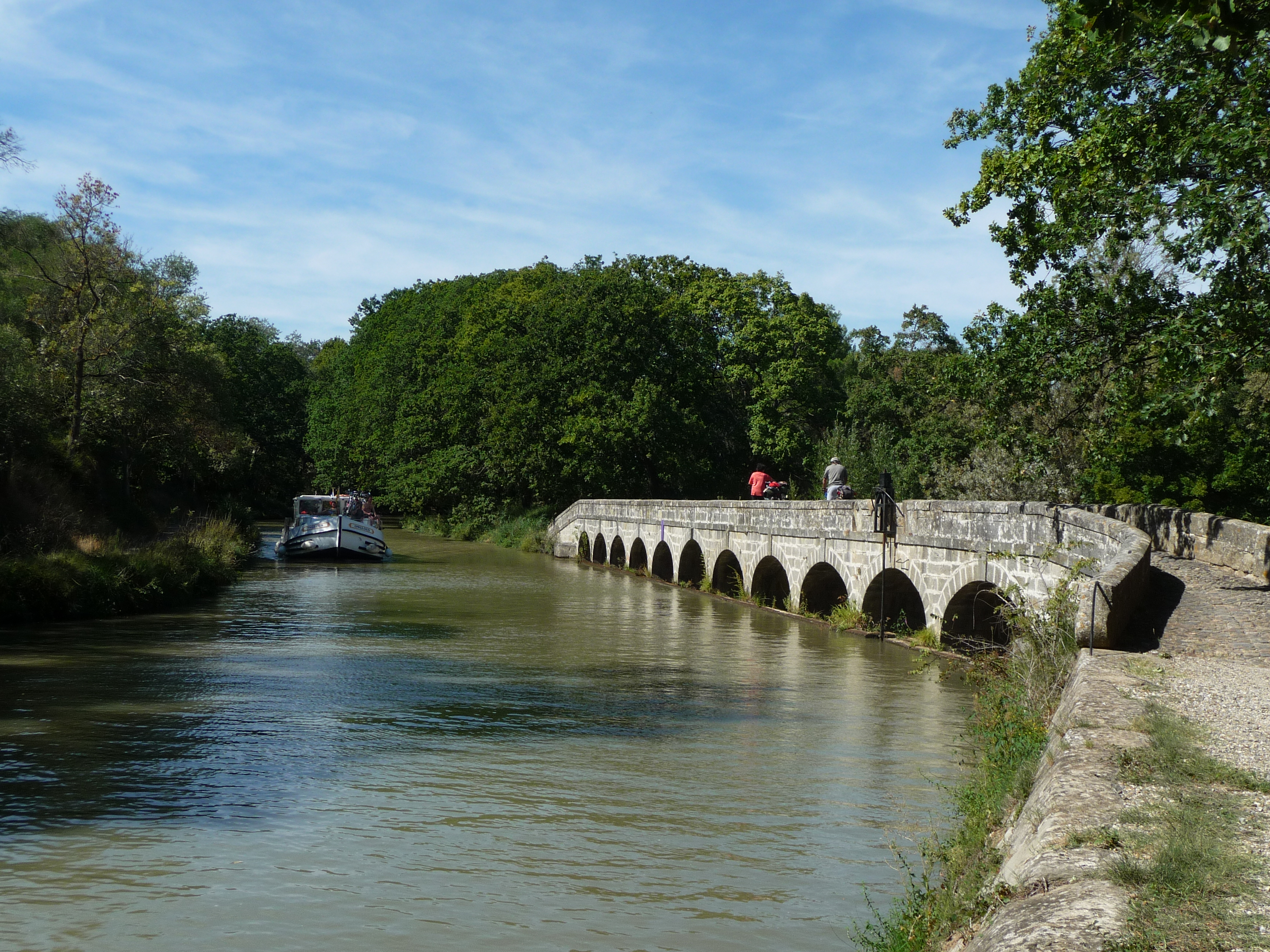
- Argent-Double Aqueduct
- Coordinates: 43°15′04.00″N 2°39′58.27″E
- Carries: Canal du Midi
- Crosses: Argent-Double River
- Locale: La Redorte

The Argent-Double Aqueduct (French: Pont-canal de l'Argent-Double; Occitan: Aqüeducte d'Argent-Doble) is one of several aqueducts on the Canal du Midi. The Argent-Double stream is culverted under the canal at La Redorte.

== Gallery ==
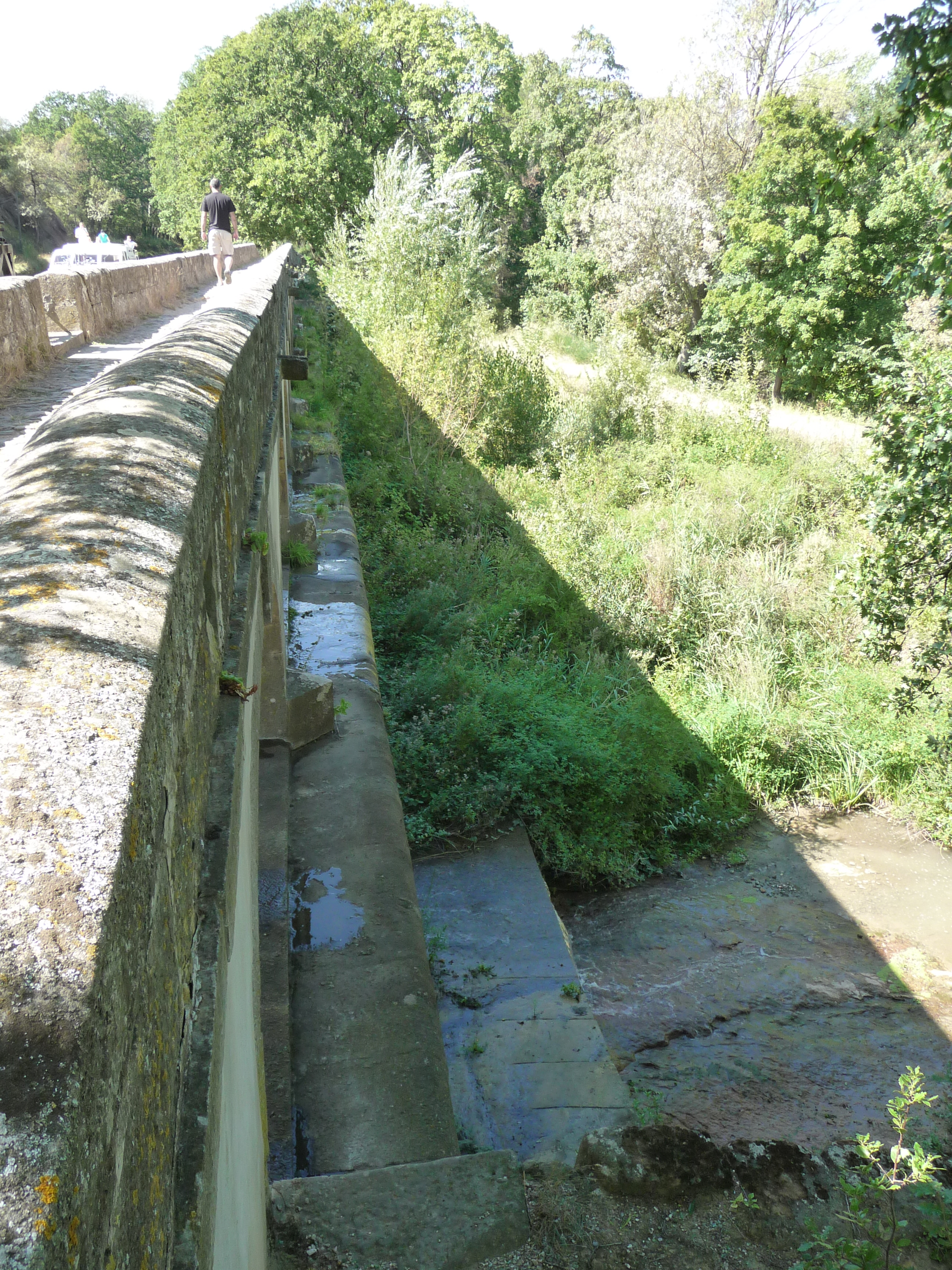
Looking down to the Argent-Double stream

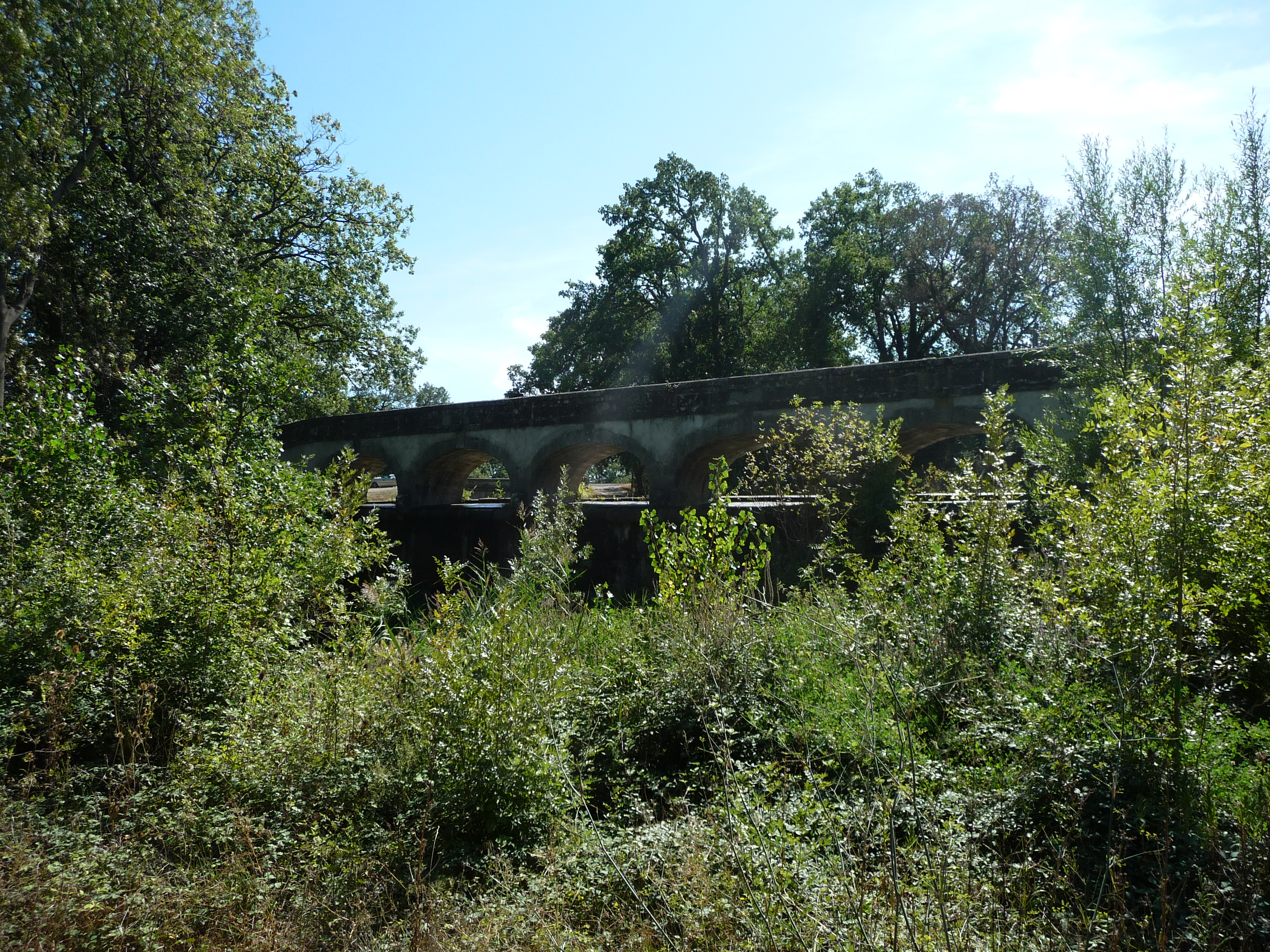
From the stream

== See also ==
- Locks on the Canal du Midi
