= Répudre Aqueduct =

Pont-canal de la Répudre
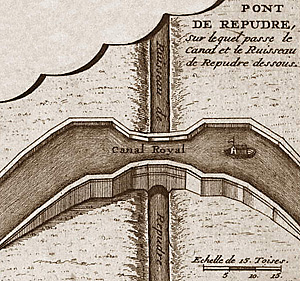
- The Répudre Aqueduct
- Coordinates: 43°15′15.90″N 2°50′24.44″E
- Carries: Canal du Midi
- Crosses: River Répudre
- Locale: Paraza

Characteristics
- Trough construction: Masonry
- Pier construction: Masonry
- Total length: 90 m.
- Width: 7.9 m.
- Towpaths: unknown
- No. of spans: 1

History
- Opened: 1676

Location
- Interactive map of Pont-canal de la Répudre

The Répudre Aqueduct (French: pont-canal de Répudre) is the first aqueduct built on the Canal du Midi. Pierre-Paul Riquet designed it to cross the Répudre River. It was built by Emmanuel d'Estan. It was designed in 1675 and completed in 1676, but was severely damaged that winter and had to be rebuilt. It is one of three original aqueducts created by Pierre-Paul Riquet during the building of the canal from 1667 to 1681.

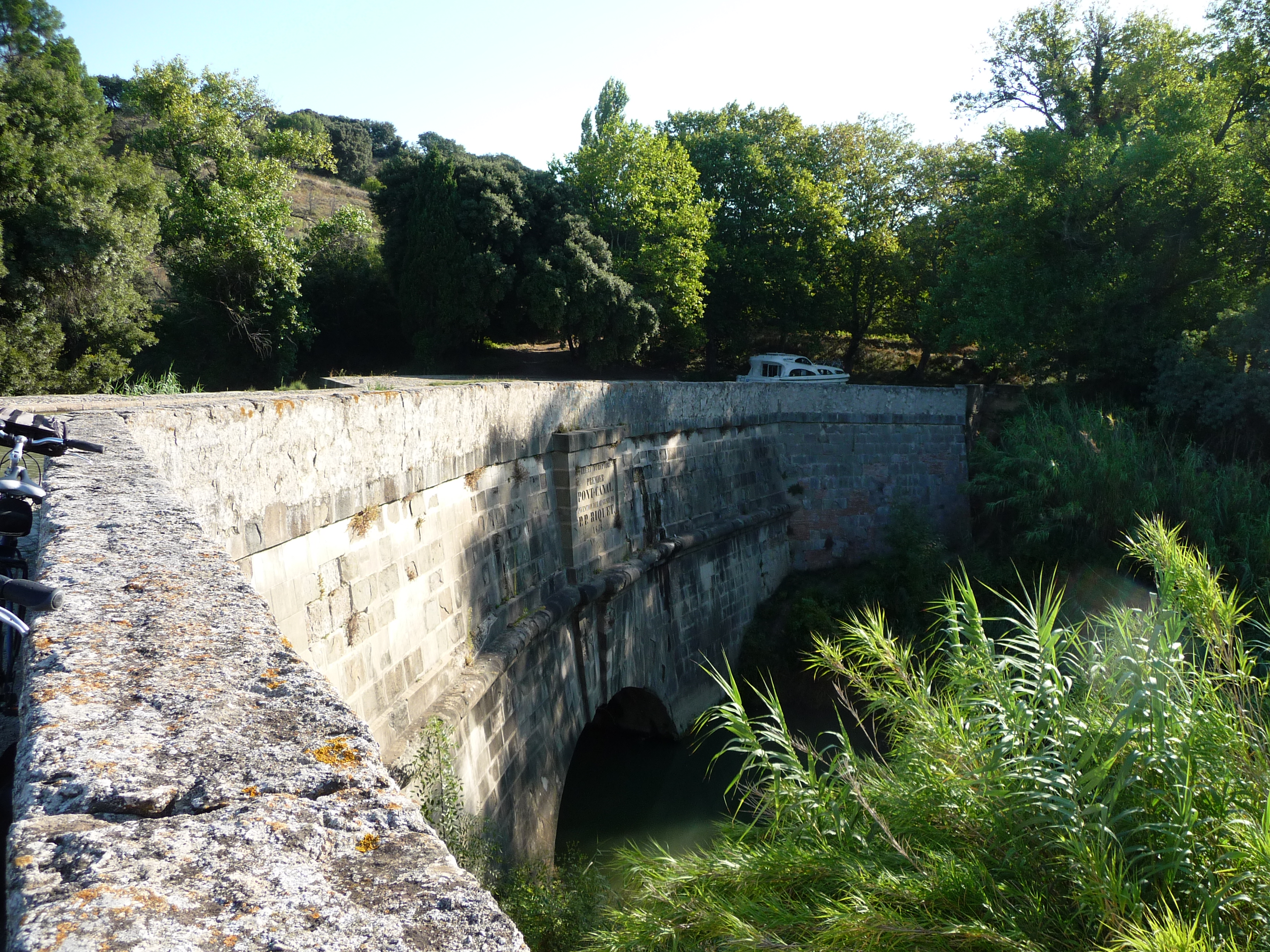
Repudre Aqueduct
