= Ouvrages du Libron =

Coordinates: 43°18′03″N 03°24′15″E

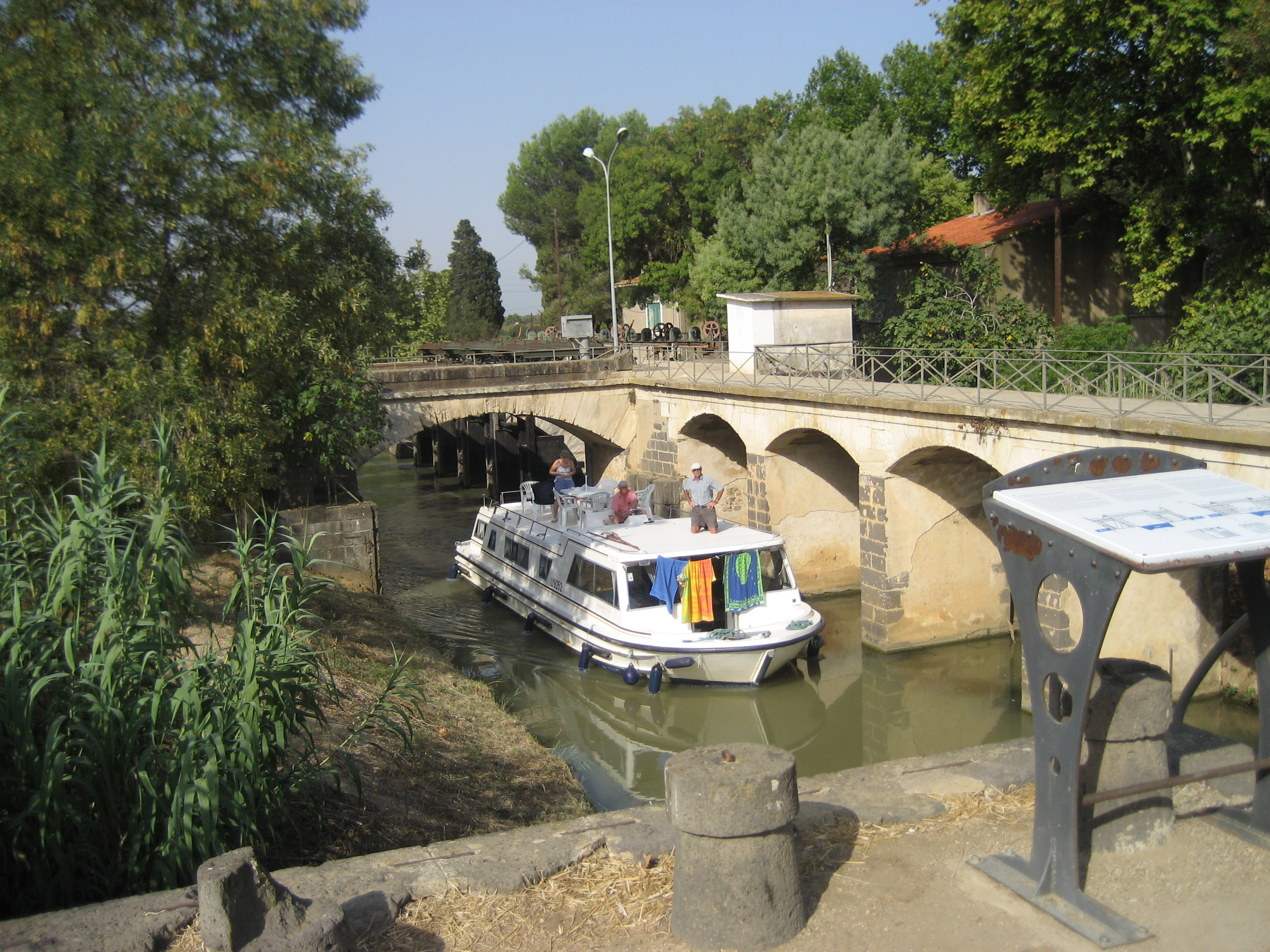
Ouvrage du Libron

Ouvrages du Libron (English: Works of Libron) is a unique structure on the Canal du Midi. It allows the Libron River, near Agde in south-west France, to traverse the Canal du Midi. At the point of intersection, the Libron is more or less at the same level as the Canal du Midi so a traditional aqueduct was not an option. The problem was further exacerbated by the Libron's propensity to flash flood up to twenty times a year. The problem was originally solved by the building of a pontoon aqueduct known as the Libron Raft which utilised a flush-decked barge to protect the canal channel in times of flooding. However, this was replaced by the present structure in 1855.

== History ==
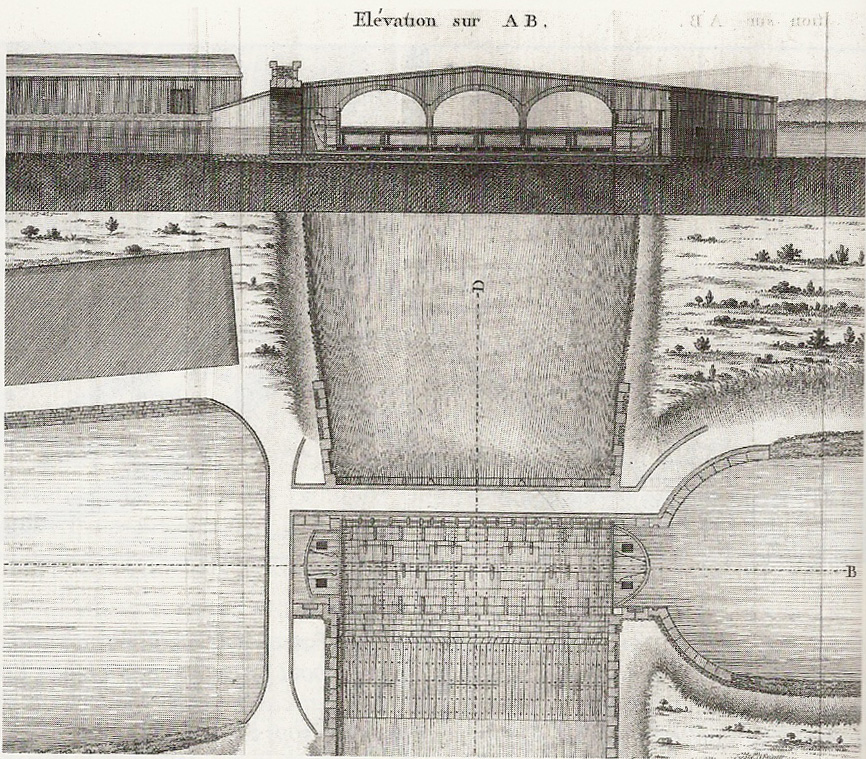
Elevation and plan of the original pontoon viaduct

The Canal du Midi was opened in 1681, a year after the death of its designer and implementer Pierre-Paul Riquet. Between its opening and the creation of the Ouvrages du Libron, the Libron would periodically overflow and fill the canal with silt and debris. During periods of flooding, a special flush-walled barge would be placed in the canal, like a raft, with high walls on either end, forming a large walled area that would allow the Libron to flow over the canal without depositing its silt and trash. Canal traffic was unable to pass whilst the barge was in place and would have to wait for the flood to recede and the barge to be removed.

In 1855, the Ouvrages du Libron (Works of Libron) were built to better allow the two streams to coexist. The engineer Urbain Maguès designed a structure that allowed the Libron to be directed in such a way as to allow a canal boat to safely pass and to limit the mud and debris being deposited into the canal by the flooding river.

== Operation ==
The Libron can be either a dry bed, or a tranquil stream, or a torrent caused by melting snow and heavy rains. During light volume, the Libron flows through a culvert beneath the intersection. During times of heavy runoff, the Libron carries significant amounts of silt and vegetation. The surface levels of the two streams are very similar during normal circumstances. This intersection at such close levels would not allow for an aqueduct or any other usual means of passing, one stream over the other.

The river bed of the Libron was modified so that the stream would split into two paths as it approached the Canal du Midi. The paths crossed the canal through the Ouvrages du Libron, consisting of six "gates" on each side of a "protected area" 30.5 metres (100 ft) in length.

In a flooding situation, the Libron crosses the Canal du Midi in two bodies. Each body passes through the "works" through six gates opening into six sluice bodies. Each sluice is made up of three portions of walls. The river comes into the works, when the sliding gate is up, and is bounded by the stone walls of the "works", then by walls that have been slid into place over the canal body, and finally the stone walls on the exiting side.

The bed of the Libron was set close to the normal level of the surface of the Canal du Midi at the crossing. Thus the beds of the sluices across the canal lie almost on the water surface of the canal.

The works allowed the river path nearest an approaching boat to be stopped for a period of time to allow a canal boat to cross through that area and rest for a time in the "protected area" between the two paths. The river path behind the boat would now be returned to flow and the path in front of the boat is halted. The boat can now cross this second path without interference.

The Libron River is in the French department of Hérault in the Languedoc-Roussillon region and flows into the Mediterranean.
