= Aiguille Aqueduct =

- Coordinates: 43.2304°N 2.6086°E
- Carries: Canal du Midi
- Crosses: Rigole de l'Etang
- Locale: Puichéric France; 13.3 km WxNW of Lézignan-Corbières, 14.3 km E of Trèbes, 18.6 km NxNE of Départemente de l' Aude, 21.0 km E of Carcassonne

Characteristics
- Piers in water: 0

The Aiguille Aqueduct (French: Aqueduc de l'Aiguille) is one of several aqueducts on the Canal du Midi. In Puichéric France, it carries the canal over a small stream, the Rigole de l'Etang. It is one of three original aqueducts created by Pierre-Paul Riquet during the building of the canal from 1667 to 1681.

== See also ==
- Locks on the Canal du Midi
- Canal du Midi
