= Herbettes Aqueduct =

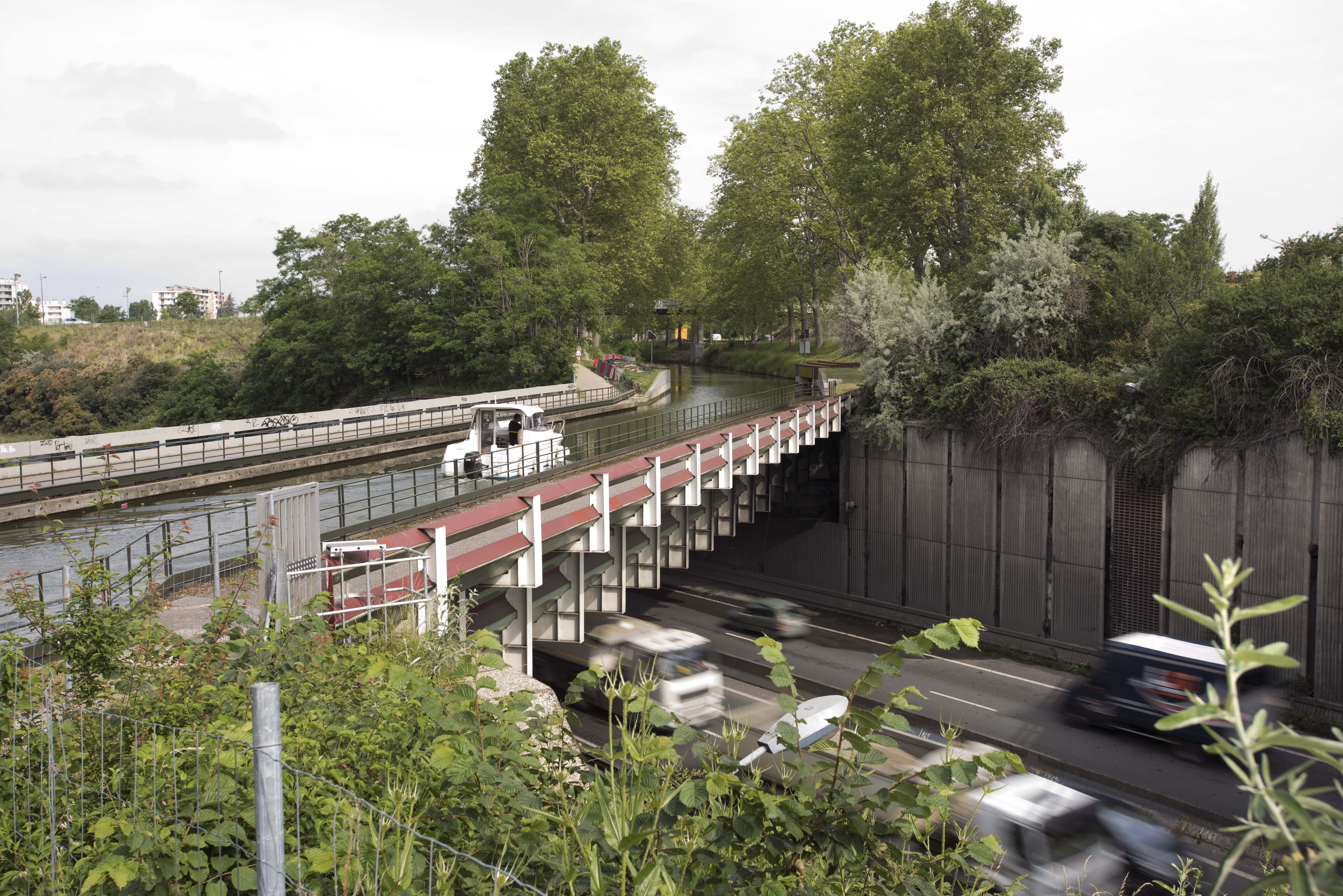
- Herbettes Aqueduct
- Coordinates: 43°34′27.31″N 1°28′10″E
- Carries: Canal du Midi
- Crosses: Four lane road in Toulouse
- Locale: Toulouse France

Characteristics
- Trough construction: Steel
- Pier construction: Steel
- Total length: 74 m (243 ft)
- Piers in water: 0

History
- Construction end: 1983

The Herbettes Aqueduct (French: Pont-Canal des Herbettes) is one of several aqueducts on the Canal du Midi. In Toulouse France, it carries the canal over a four-lane highway in a metal trough. The trough has been colorfully painted underneath. The aqueduct is about 2 km (1.2 mi) from the Port Saint-Sauveur.

The structure is made of steel, is 74 m (243 ft) long, and was completed in 1983.

== See also ==
- Locks on the Canal du Midi
