= Baugé (disambiguation) =

Baugé is a former commune in the Maine-et-Loire department in western France.

Baugé may also refer to:

== Family name ==
- Achille Maffre de Baugé, Occitan poet
- André Baugé, 20th century opera and operetta singer
- Grégory Baugé, cyclist

== See also ==
- Battle of Baugé, a 1421 battle
- Château de Baugé, a restored castle in Baugé
- Opéra de Baugé, an annual opera festival
- Bâgé-le-Châtel, commune in the Ain department in eastern France
