= Marseillan =

Marseillan is the name of three communes in France:

- Marseillan, Gers, in the Gers département
- Marseillan, Hérault, in the Hérault département
- Marseillan, Hautes-Pyrénées, in the Hautes-Pyrénées département
