= List of botanical gardens in Spain =

Botanical gardens in Spain have collections consisting entirely of Spain native and endemic species; most have a collection that include plants from around the world. There are botanical gardens and arboreta in all states and territories of Spain, most are administered by local governments, some are privately owned.

- Jardín botánico de Padrón A Coruña, Padrón
- Parque de la Florida Álava, Vitoria
- Arboretum La Alfaguara Alfacar, Granada
- El Huerto del Cura Alicante, Elche
- Cactuslandia Alicante
- Jardín Botánico del Albardinar, Níjar, Almería
- Jardín Botánico Atlántico Asturias, Gijón
- Jardí Botànic de Barcelona (Botanical garden of Barcelona) Barcelona
- Jardí Botànic Històric de Barcelona (Historic botanical garden of Barcelona) Barcelona
- Jardín Botánico de Coria Cáceres, Coria
- Jardín Botánico El Castillejo, Cádiz
- Jardín Botánico Canario Viera y Clavijo Canary Islands, Las Palmas
- Palmetum of Santa Cruz de Tenerife Canary Islands, Santa Cruz de Tenerife
- Jardín de Aclimatación de La Orotava Canary Islands, Puerto de la Cruz
- Cactus Park Canary Islands, Tenerife
- Jardín de Cactus Guatiza – Teguise Canary Islands, Lanzarote
- Zoo Botánico de Jerez Cádiz, Jerez de la Frontera
- Jardín Botánico de Castilla-La Mancha, Albacete, Castilla-La Mancha, España
- Jardín Botánico de Córdoba Córdoba
- Jardín Botánico Marimurtra Gerona, Blanes
- Jardín Botánico Pinya de Rosa Gerona, Blanes
- Jardín Botánico de la Cortijuela, Granada
- El Jardín Botánico Iturrarán Guipúzcoa
- Real Jardín Botánico de Madrid Madrid
- Real Jardín Botánico Alfonso XIII, Madrid
- Jardín Botánico Juan Carlos I, Universidad de Alcalá Madrid, Alcalá de Henares
- Jardín Botánico-Histórico la Concepción Málaga
- Jardín Botánico Mundani, Majorca
- El Jardín Botánico del Malecón Murcia
- El Arboreto Carambolo Seville
- Zoo de Matapozuelos, Valladolid
- Jardín Botánico de Soller (Jardí Botànic de Sóller)
- Jardín Botánico de Valencia (Jardí Botànic de Valencia)Valencia
- Arboretum-Pinetum Lucus Augusti (Lugo)
