= Les Onglous Lighthouse =

Lighthouse in Hérault, France

Les Onglous Lighthouse Canal du Midi
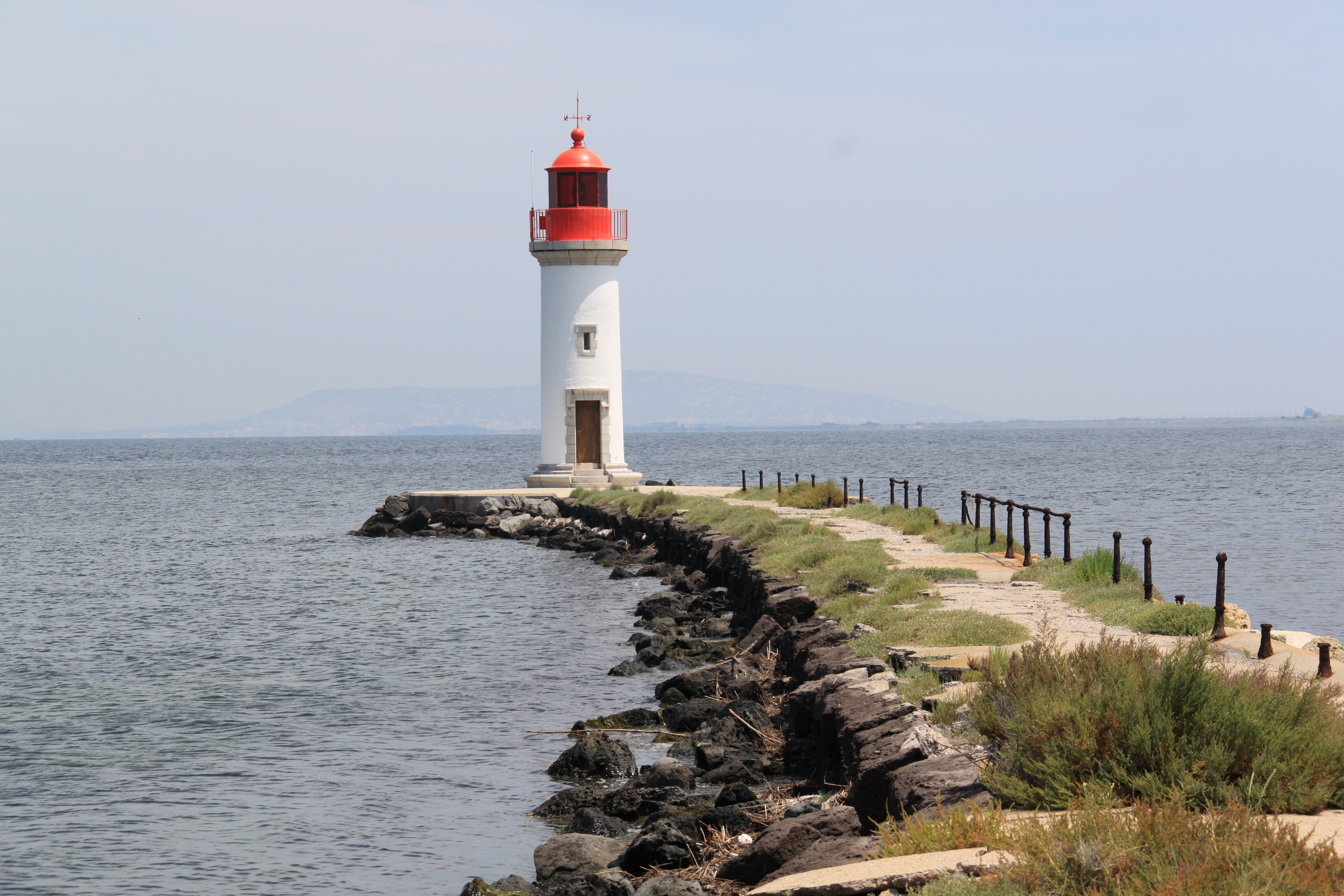
- Leaving the Canal du Midi and entering the Etang de Thau
- Location: Marseillan, Hérault, Hérault; France
- Coordinates: 43°20′24.1″N 3°32′23.2″E

Tower
- Constructed: 1902
- Construction: masonry tower
- Height: 11 metres (36 ft)
- Shape: cylindrical tower with balcony and lantern
- Markings: white tower, red lantern and rail

Light
- Focal height: 10 metres (33 ft)
- Characteristic: Oc (2) WR 6s.

The Les Onglous Lighthouse is the terminating point of the Canal du Midi where the canal enters the Étang de Thau. The red and white lighthouse is at the tip of a short jetty projecting into the Étang de Thau. It is located on the east jetty at the canal entrance, about 1.5 km (0.93 mi) south of Marseillan in the Hérault department. The Isthmus of Onglous is a narrow strip of land between the Étang and the Mediterranean.

== Gallery ==
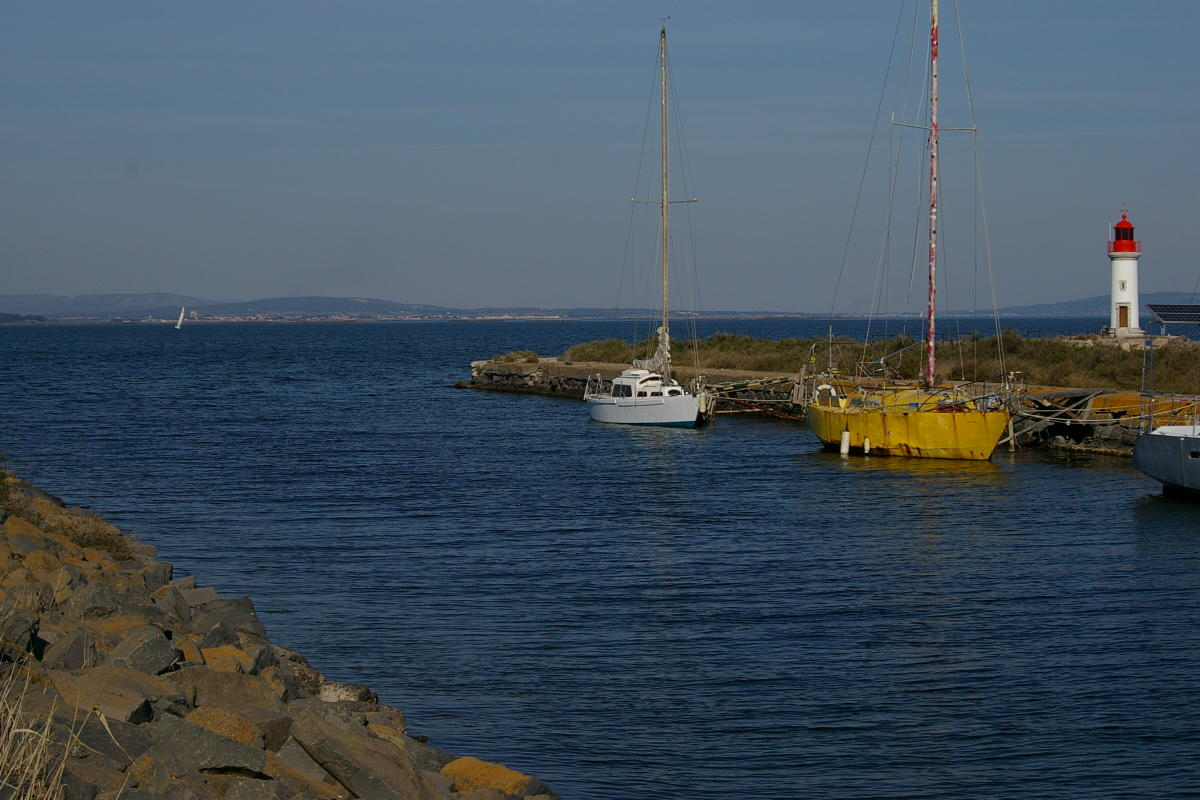
Canal du Midi joins Etang de Thau at Les Onglous.

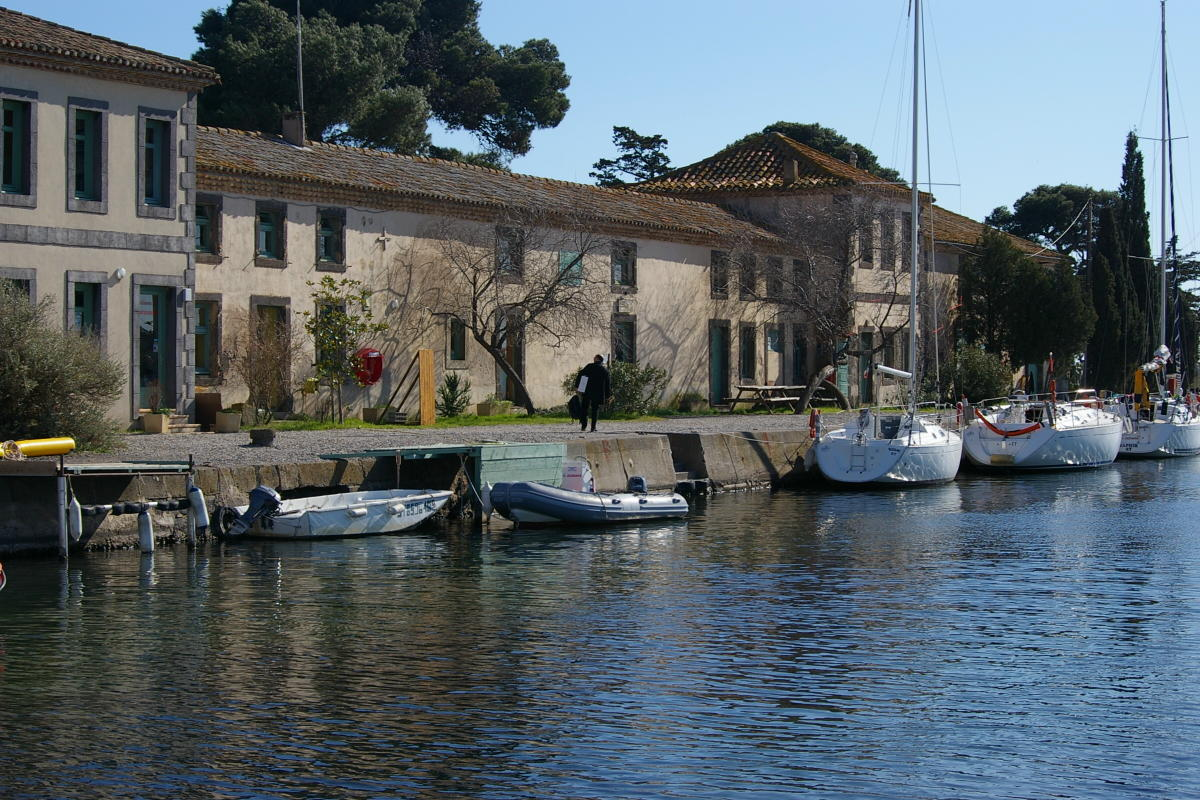
Canal building at Les Onglous.

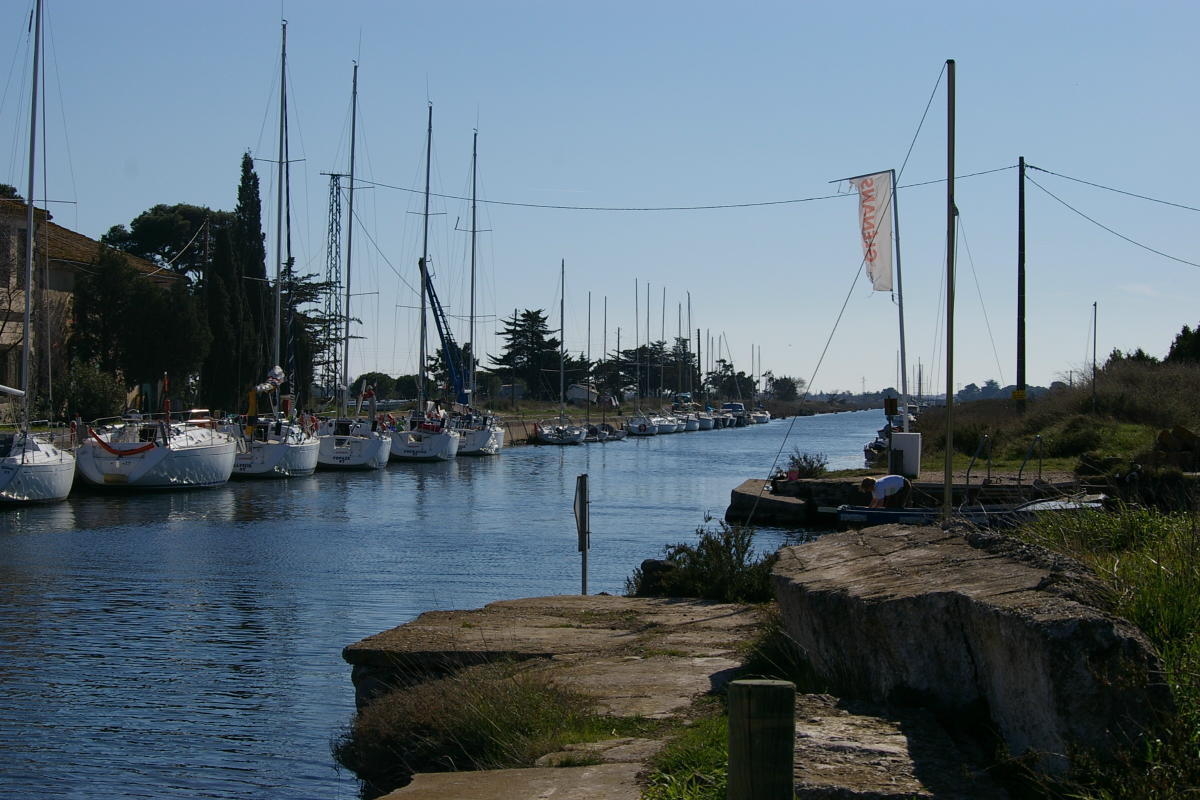

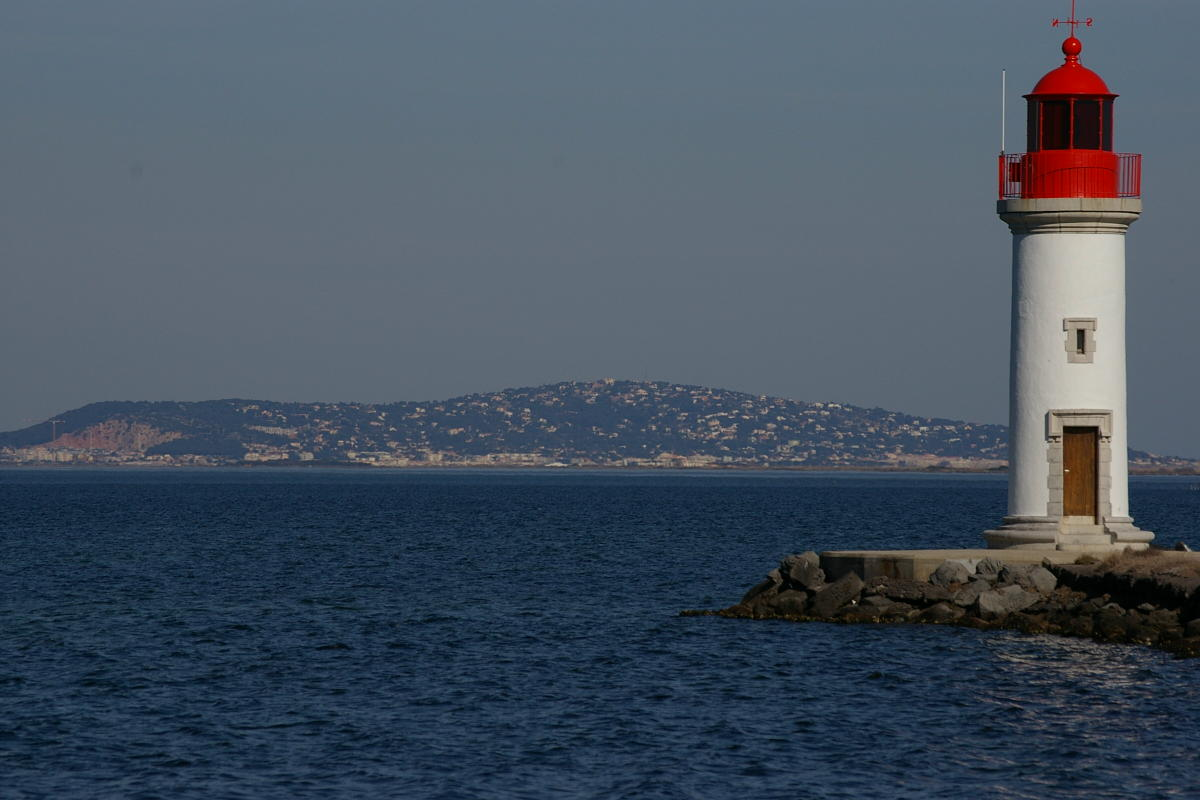

== See also ==
- List of lighthouses in France
