= Canton of Agde =

Coordinates: 43°20′09″N 3°27′43″E

Agde
- Canton
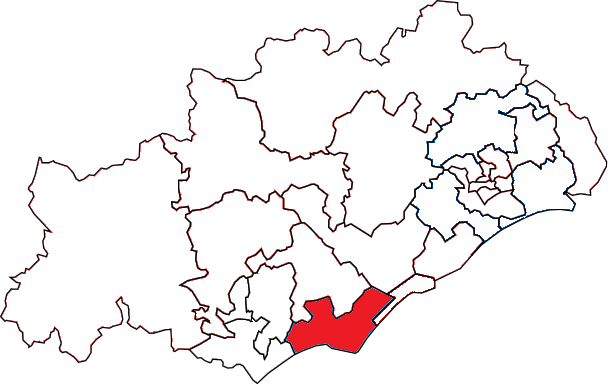
- Interactive map of Agde
- Country: France
- Region: Occitania
- Department: Hérault
- No. of communes: {{{nbcomm}}}

Government
  - Representatives (2021–2028): Marie-Christine Fabre de Roussac; Sébastien Frey
- Area: 182.82 km^{2} (70.59 sq mi)
- Population (2023): 53,673
  - Density: 293.58/km^{2} (760.38/sq mi)
- INSEE code: 34 01

The Canton of Agde is a subdivision of the French department of Hérault, and its subdivision, the Arrondissement of Béziers.

== Municipalities ==
Since the French canton reorganisation which came into effect in March 2015, the communes of the canton of Agde are:

- Agde
- Bessan
- Marseillan
- Portiragnes
- Vias

== History ==
This Canton was revised in 2008. In 2015 the commune of Portiragnes became part of it.

== Councillors ==
Election	Councillors	Party	Occupation
2015	Marie-Christine Fabre de Roussac	LR	Vice-mayors of Marseillan
2015	Sébastien Frey	UDI	Vice-mayors of Agde

== Pictures of the canton ==
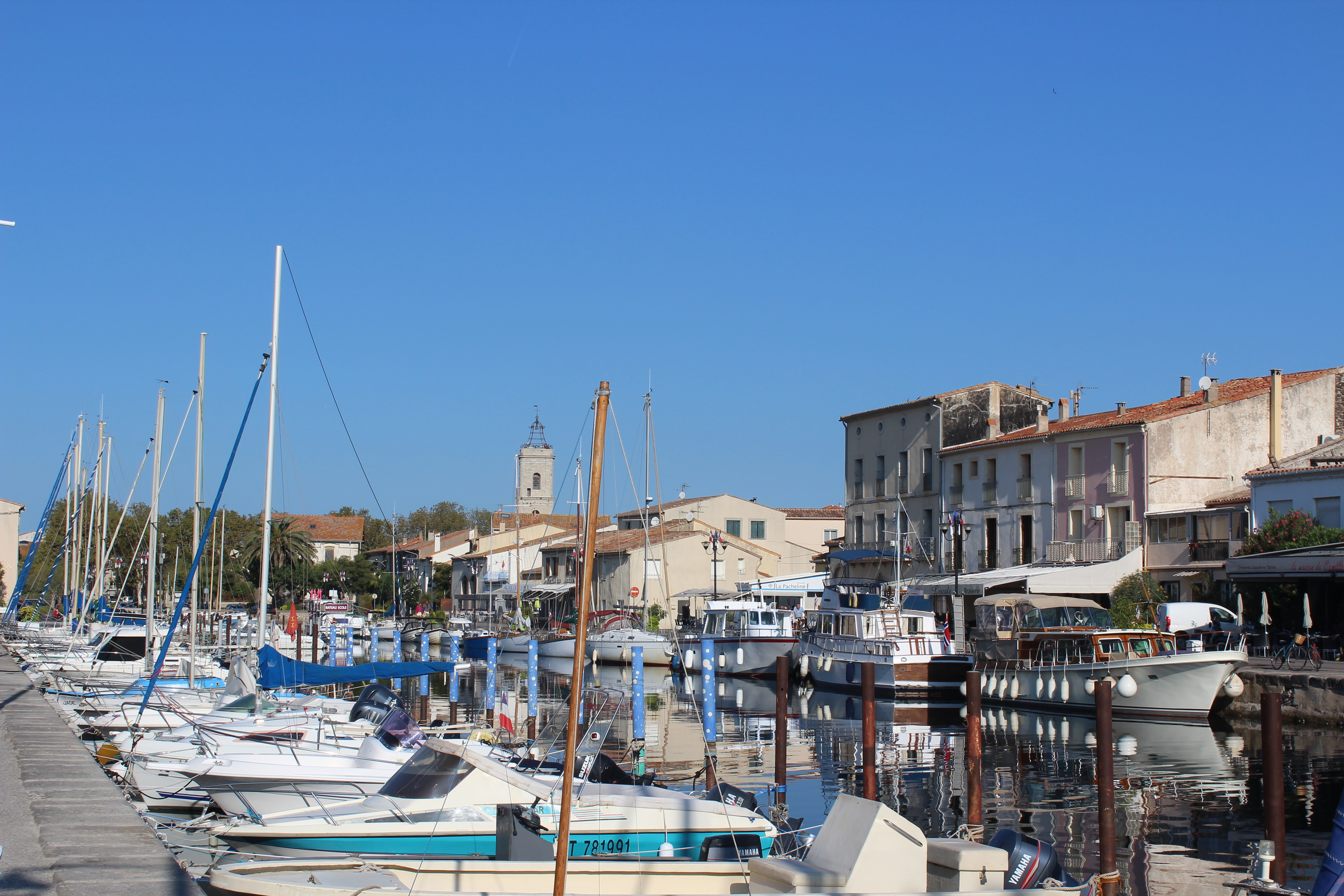
Marseillan Port

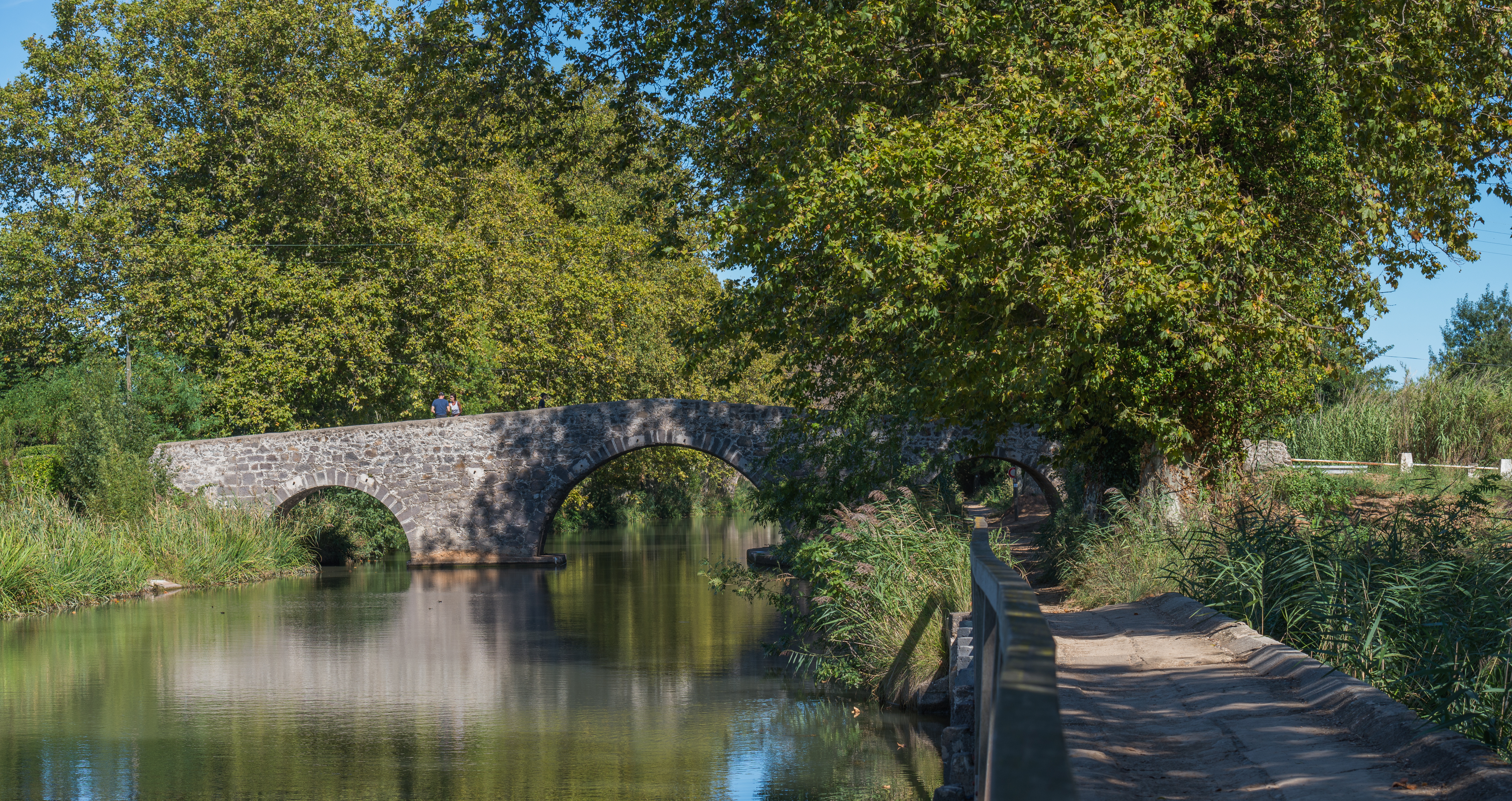
Bridge over the Canal du Midi in Agde

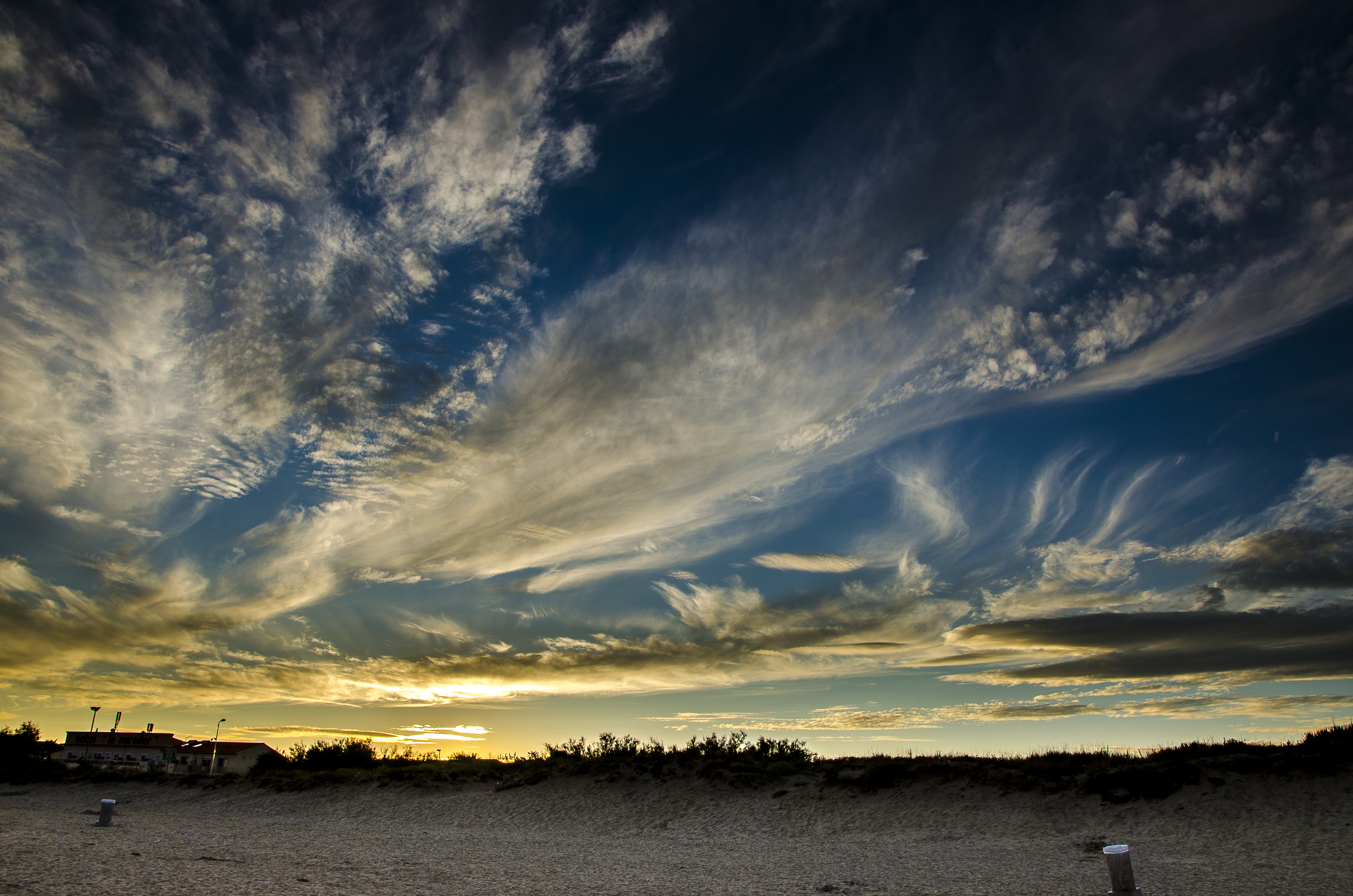
Portiragnes Beach
