= Portiragnes =

- Commune
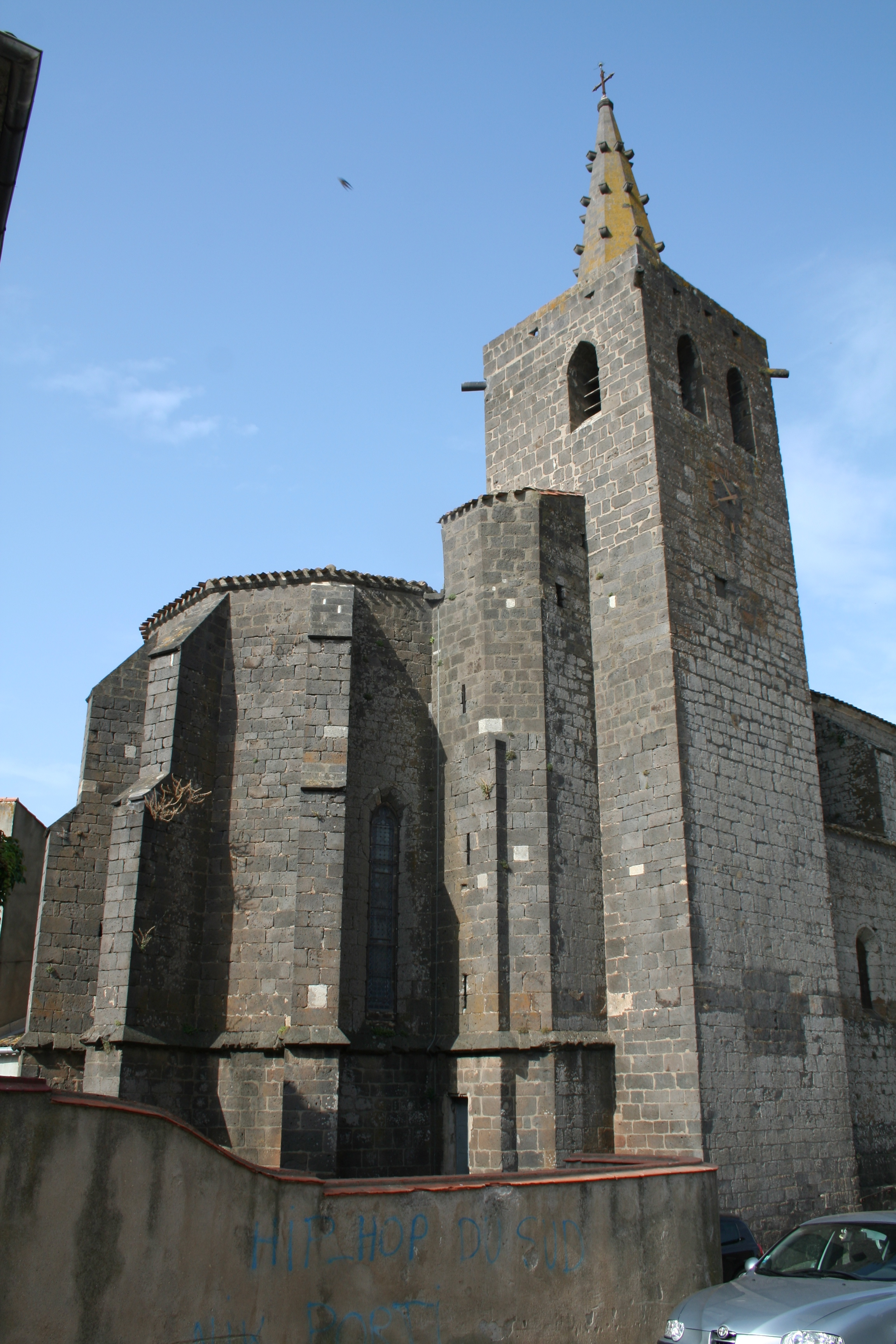
- The church of Saint-Félix

- Coat of arms
- Location of Portiragnes
- Location within France Location within Occitanie
- Coordinates: 43°18′19″N 3°20′11″E
- Country: France
- Region: Occitania
- Department: Hérault
- Arrondissement: Béziers
- Canton: Agde
- Intercommunality: CA Hérault Méditerranée

Government
  - Mayor (2020–2026): Gwendoline Chaudoir
- Area^{1}: 20.16 km^{2} (7.78 sq mi)
- Elevation: 10 m (33 ft)
- Highest elevation: 41 m (135 ft)
- Lowest elevation: 0 m (0 ft)
- Population (2023): 3,530
  - Density: 175/km^{2} (454/sq mi)
- Time zone: UTC+01:00 (CET)
  - Summer (DST): UTC+02:00 (CEST)
- INSEE/Postal code: 34209 /34420
- ^{1} French Land Register data, which excludes lakes, ponds, glaciers > 1 km^{2} (0.386 sq mi or 247 acres) and river estuaries.

Portiragnes (French pronunciation: [pɔʁtiʁɑɲ]; Occitan: Portiranhas) is a commune in the Hérault department in the Occitanie region in southern France.

== Geography ==
=== Climate ===
Portiragnes has a mediterranean climate (Köppen climate classification Csa). The average annual temperature in Portiragnes is 15.1 °C (59.2 °F). The average annual rainfall is 578.5 mm (22.78 in) with October as the wettest month. The temperatures are highest on average in July, at around 23.8 °C (74.8 °F), and lowest in January, at around 7.7 °C (45.9 °F). The highest temperature ever recorded in Portiragnes was 39.7 °C (103.5 °F) on 28 June 2019; the coldest temperature ever recorded was −9.6 °C (14.7 °F) on 5 January 1995.

Climate data for Portiragnes (1981–2010 averages, extremes 1994−present)
Month	Jan	Feb	Mar	Apr	May	Jun	Jul	Aug	Sep	Oct	Nov	Dec	Year
Record high °C (°F)	21.1 (70.0)	23.7 (74.7)	28.1 (82.6)	32.5 (90.5)	33.6 (92.5)	39.7 (103.5)	38.5 (101.3)	39.1 (102.4)	34.8 (94.6)	33.1 (91.6)	24.9 (76.8)	20.4 (68.7)	39.7 (103.5)
Mean daily maximum °C (°F)	11.9 (53.4)	13.0 (55.4)	16.2 (61.2)	18.4 (65.1)	22.1 (71.8)	26.8 (80.2)	29.5 (85.1)	29.1 (84.4)	24.8 (76.6)	20.7 (69.3)	15.5 (59.9)	12.1 (53.8)	20.0 (68.0)
Daily mean °C (°F)	7.7 (45.9)	8.2 (46.8)	11.0 (51.8)	13.4 (56.1)	17.2 (63.0)	21.3 (70.3)	23.8 (74.8)	23.5 (74.3)	19.5 (67.1)	16.3 (61.3)	11.1 (52.0)	7.8 (46.0)	15.1 (59.2)
Mean daily minimum °C (°F)	3.4 (38.1)	3.5 (38.3)	5.8 (42.4)	8.4 (47.1)	12.2 (54.0)	15.7 (60.3)	18.1 (64.6)	17.9 (64.2)	14.2 (57.6)	11.9 (53.4)	6.7 (44.1)	3.6 (38.5)	10.2 (50.4)
Record low °C (°F)	−9.6 (14.7)	−7.6 (18.3)	−8.7 (16.3)	−1.6 (29.1)	3.4 (38.1)	7.4 (45.3)	9.8 (49.6)	10.1 (50.2)	6.3 (43.3)	−0.8 (30.6)	−7.4 (18.7)	−8.1 (17.4)	−9.6 (14.7)
Average precipitation mm (inches)	56.5 (2.22)	57.8 (2.28)	28.6 (1.13)	49.0 (1.93)	50.8 (2.00)	27.1 (1.07)	10.9 (0.43)	26.8 (1.06)	70.0 (2.76)	79.1 (3.11)	67.0 (2.64)	54.9 (2.16)	578.5 (22.78)
Average precipitation days (≥ 1.0 mm)	6.3	4.3	3.9	5.1	5.7	3.3	1.9	3.9	4.8	5.8	5.3	5.5	55.9
Source: Meteociel

== Population ==
Historical population
Year	Pop.	±% p.a.
1968	1,109	—
1975	1,202	+1.16%
1982	1,348	+1.65%
1990	1,770	+3.46%
1999	2,278	+2.84%
2007	3,094	+3.90%
2012	3,243	+0.95%
2017	3,134	−0.68%
2023	3,530	+2.00%
Source: INSEE

== See also ==
- Communes of the Hérault department
