= Marseillan-Plage station =

Railway station in France

Marseillan-Plage
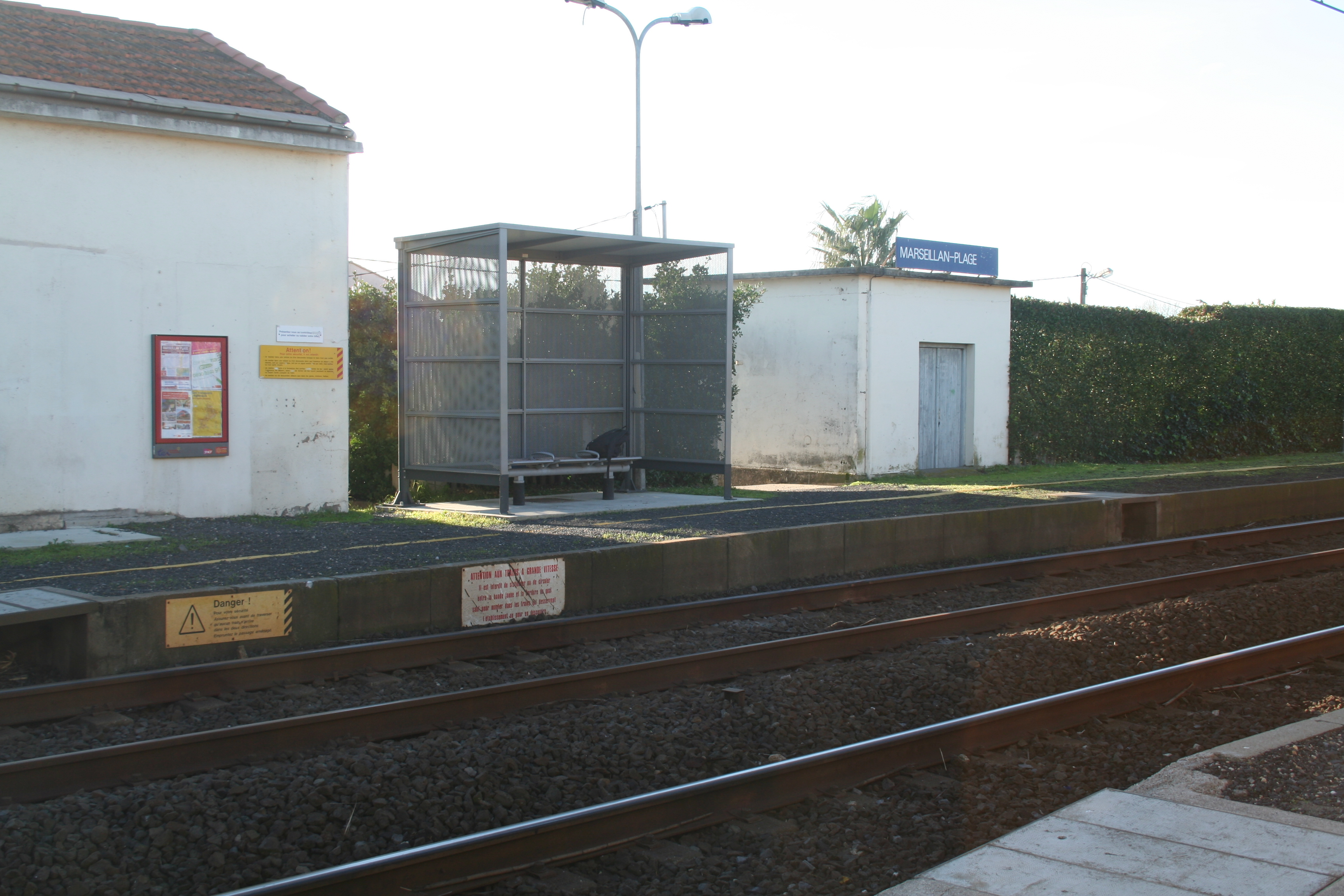
- Marseillan-Plage station

General information
- Location: Avenue de la gare 34340 Marseillan; Hérault, France
- Coordinates: 43.318185°N 3.535492°E
- Elevation: 3 metres (9.8 ft)
- Owner: SNCF
- Operator: SNCF
- Line: Bordeaux–Sète railway
- Distance: 458.278
- Platforms: 2
- Tracks: 2

Other information
- Station code: 87781294

History
- Opened: 19 January 1857

Services
Preceding station	TER Occitanie	Following station
Agde towards Narbonne	21	Sète towards Avignon-Centre
Location

Marseillan-Plage station (French: Gare de Marseillan-Plage) is a French railway station in Marseillan, Hérault, Occitanie, southern France. Within TER Occitanie, it is part of line 21 (Narbonne–Avignon).
