= Bessan =

Commune in France

- Commune
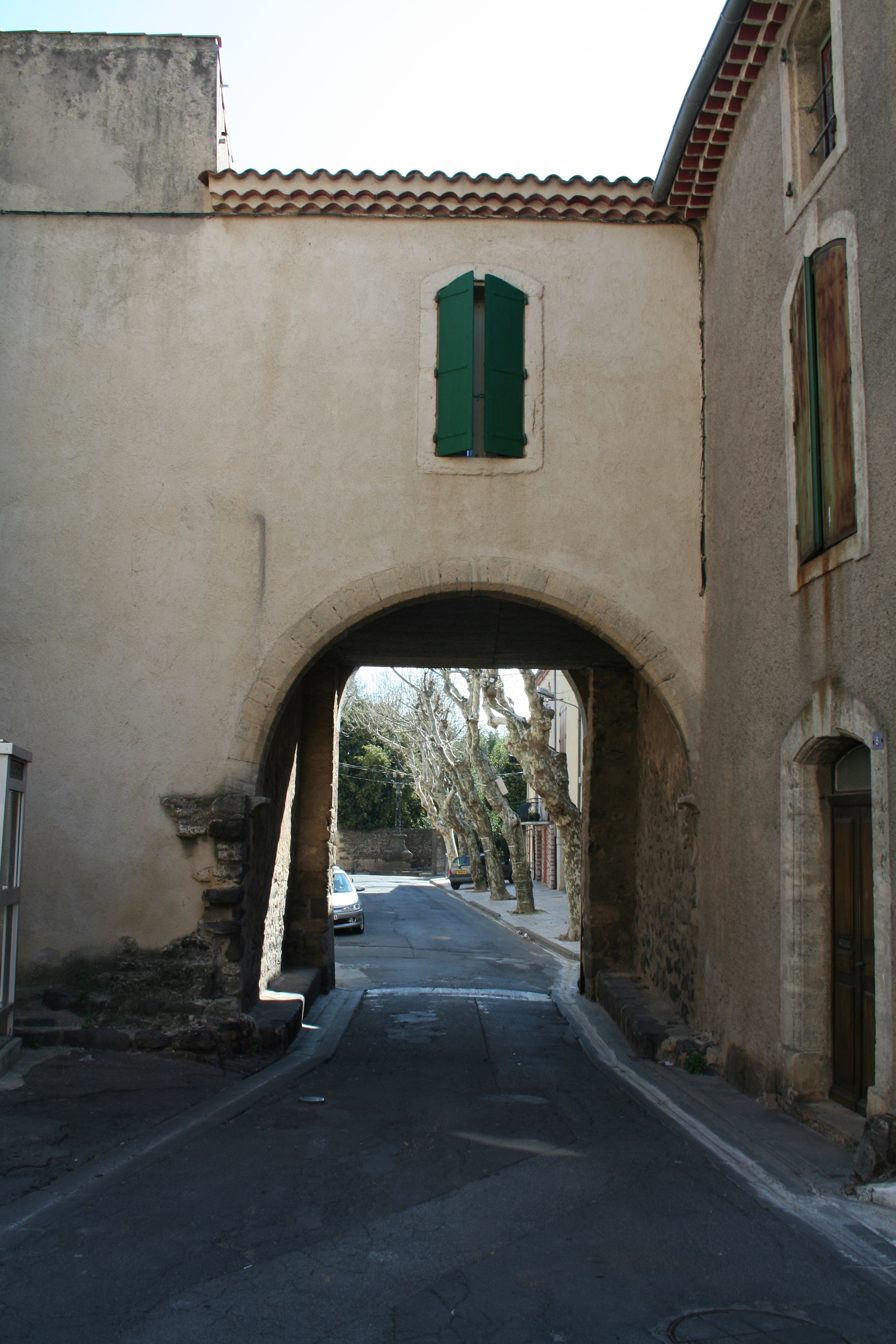
- The Historic Bessan Village Door

- Coat of arms
- Location of Bessan
- Location within France Location within Occitanie
- Coordinates: 43°21′43″N 3°25′30″E
- Country: France
- Region: Occitania
- Department: Hérault
- Arrondissement: Béziers
- Canton: Agde
- Intercommunality: CA Hérault Méditerranée

Government
  - Mayor (2020–2026): Stéphane Pépin-Bonnet
- Area^{1}: 27.65 km^{2} (10.68 sq mi)
- Elevation: 8 m (26 ft)
- Highest elevation: 84 m (276 ft)
- Lowest elevation: 0 m (0 ft)
- Population (2023): 5,838
  - Density: 211.1/km^{2} (546.8/sq mi)
- Time zone: UTC+01:00 (CET)
  - Summer (DST): UTC+02:00 (CEST)
- INSEE/Postal code: 34031 /34550
- ^{1} French Land Register data, which excludes lakes, ponds, glaciers > 1 km^{2} (0.386 sq mi or 247 acres) and river estuaries.

Bessan (French pronunciation: [bɛsɑ̃]; Occitan: Beçan) is a commune in the Hérault department of the Occitanie region in France. Its inhabitants are known as 'Bessanais' in French.

== Geography ==
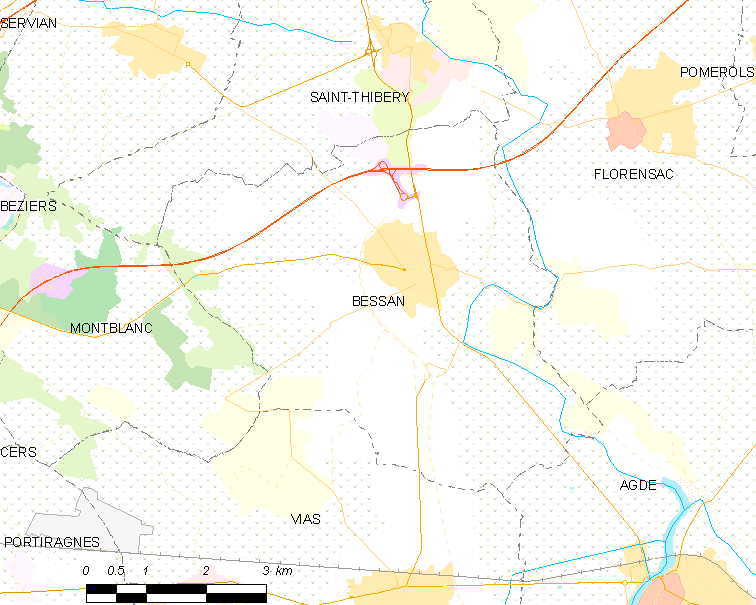
Map

Built among vineyards on the river Hérault, Bessan is a mainly agricultural village. In the past, its port was used to ship wines and other spirits.

Located a few kilometres from the Mediterranean Sea, it contains the Ricard distillery and Cactus Park botanical garden.

== History ==
Around 600 BC, Greeks settled in Bessan on the oppidum of Monadière to trade.

In 218 BC, the Carthaginian general Hannibal crossed the region with his army and war elephants to attack the Romans, passing between Bessan and Montblanc.

In 408–409 AD, Béziers, Agde and the region were ransacked by an army of Germanic (Burgundians, Suevi, Vandals), Slavic (Alan) and other tribes.

In 737, Charles Martel entered the province at the head of the French, temporarily pushing back the Saracens, and destroyed Béziers, Agde and the surrounding countryside to prevent the Saracens from returning and fortifying the region.

1050–1100, the fortified village of Bessan starts to be built.

In 1209, the Crusader army, led by Simon de Montfort, seized the region under the pretext of hunting the Cathars, and ten years later the castles of Bessan and Touroulle became the property of his son, Amaury.

In 1278, the Bessanais had obtained the right to elect consuls (mayors) to deal with political affairs from their seigneur.

In 1348, the plague killed a large proportion of the population. It returned several times thereafter.

On the 30 October 1587, Antoine Scipio, the new Duke of Joyeuse and leader of the Catholics, took advantage of the governor of Languedocs' absence in the Tarn with his army. Scipio seized and looted Bessan.

In 1851, during the coup of Napoleon III, a cannon was pointed at the Grand'rue and some thirty republican Bessanais were deported.

In 1907, the Bessanais was actively involved in the Midi wine revolt.

In November 1942, German troops entered and occupied Bessan. They fled in August 1944, after the Allied landing in Provence.

== Population ==
Historical population

Year	Pop.	±% p.a.
1793	2,003	—
1800	2,078	+0.53%
1806	1,976	−0.84%
1821	2,246	+0.86%
1831	2,228	−0.08%
1836	2,336	+0.95%
1841	2,265	−0.62%
1846	2,287	+0.19%
1851	2,297	+0.09%
1856	2,336	+0.34%
1861	2,455	+1.00%
1866	2,537	+0.66%
1872	2,552	+0.10%
1876	2,557	+0.05%
1881	2,544	−0.10%
1886	2,535	−0.07%
1891	2,680	+1.12%
1896	2,701	+0.16%
1901	2,848	+1.07%

Year	Pop.	±% p.a.
1906	2,755	−0.66%
1911	2,863	+0.77%
1921	3,099	+0.80%
1926	3,388	+1.80%
1931	3,487	+0.58%
1936	3,034	−2.74%
1946	2,651	−1.34%
1954	2,754	+0.48%
1962	2,919	+0.73%
1968	2,972	+0.30%
1975	2,911	−0.30%
1982	2,997	+0.42%
1990	3,356	+1.42%
1999	4,025	+2.04%
2007	4,391	+1.09%
2012	4,690	+1.33%
2017	5,069	+1.57%
2023	5,838	+2.38%

Source: EHESS and INSEE (1968-2023)

== See also ==
- Communes of the Hérault department
