= Marie Lion =

French–Australian novelist

- from The Harbinger of Light. 1 May 1911
- Born: 2 May 1855; Marseillan, Hérault, France
- Died: 3 May 1922 (aged 67); Adelaide
- Occupations: Novelist, artist, teacher

Marie Lion (2 May 1855 – 3 May 1922) was a French–Australian novelist, artist, and teacher. For forty years she lived in Australia with her sister Berthe Mouchette, an accomplished artist and art teacher. Lion was Australia's first French novelist, and the first French teacher for the Alliance française in Australia.

== Early life ==
She was born in Marseillan, Herault. As a student, her particular interests were languages, literature, and art, and she received a Degré Supérieur from l’Académie de Paris in French language and literature. After hearing a lecture on Australia by the Australian novelist Jessie Couvreur ('Tasma') at the Société de Géographie, Lion and her sister decided to emigrate.

== Career ==
Marie Lion and Berthe Mouchette arrived in Melbourne in the second half of 1881 and began to offer art lessons and French language classes. After the death of her husband, Émile Mouchette, Berthe bought Oberwyl, a girls' school in St Kilda. Marie Lion was director of French studies, literature, and conversation. In 1890, Mouchette was responsible for founding the Melbourne branch of the Alliance française. Meetings were held at Oberwyl, where Lion taught the Alliance française's first French language classes in Australia. In December that year Table Talk reported that 'a large and fashionable' group of parents and friends attended Oberwyl's annual Soirée Musicale et Dramatique, where the 'feature of the evening' was a French play about the discovery of Australia, written by Marie Lion for the occasion and presented by students. In the depression that followed the Melbourne land boom of the 1880s, Berthe Mouchette was forced to sell the school and her assets.

Lion and her sister arrived in Adelaide in 1892 to start a new life. They joined the South Australian Society of Arts and began exhibiting, offering art classes, and teaching the children of wealthy Adelaideans, such as the lawyer and politician, Edward Hawker and the surgeon, Sir Edward Stirling. Later, they had a studio adjacent to that of Margaret Preston and Bessie Davidson in the Adelaide Steamship Building in Currie Street, where they taught painting, drawing and French language and literature. Lion and her sister offered their studio to the Australian feminist Vida Goldstein in 1909 for a meeting about issues including equal pay for equal work, equal custody and guardianship of children, equal marriage, and divorce laws. Mademoiselle Lion's art was not reviewed as favourably as Madame Mouchette's; her strengths were more in the area of literature. One of Lion's numerous public presentations on aspects of French culture was a lecture to the Association of French teachers on Victor Hugo at the University of Adelaide in August 1913.

Following the theosophist Annie Besant's visit to Adelaide in 1894, Lion joined the Theosophical Society. She wrote articles for The Critic, detailing the sisters' trip to India in late 1902 and early 1903, when they visited the organisation's headquarters at Adyar in South Madras and stayed with Besant. Theosophical beliefs were to play an important part in the three novels that she wrote in French between 1908 and 1913, while living at Mylor in the hills outside Adelaide .

During World War I, Lion returned to France and volunteered as a nurse, working night shifts in a Paris hospital. While there she shared a flat with Bessie Davidson. Following her return to Adelaide in February 1916, she received numerous invitations to speak about aspects of wartime France.

After Lion's death in May 1922, she was described as 'a gifted and cultured lady, who exercised a considerable influence' on the cultural life of Adelaide for thirty years.

== Novels ==
Lion wrote three novels in French and published them under the pseudonym Noël Aimir, an anagram of her name:

- Lion, Marie [Noël Aimir']. Vers La Lumière. Edinburgh: Constable, 1910. (Translated into English: Aimir, Noël. The Black Pearl. Melbourne: George Robertson, 1911.)
- Lion, Marie ['Noël Aimir']. La Dévadâsi. Adelaide: Hussey & Gillingham, 1911.
- Lion, Marie ['Noël Aimir']. Les Dieux Interviennent. Paris: Plon-Nourrit, 1916. (Republished: Léon, Marie [sic]. Pour Sauver la Reine. Paris: Plon-Nourrit, 1922.)

Vers la Lumière ('Towards the Light' or 'Towards Enlightenment') was inspired by Besant's visit to Adelaide in 1908. Its narrator, a young French woman named Jeanne, comes to her uncle’s station on the edge of Lake Alexandrina in rural South Australia. She is faced with a choice between two suitors: Hector, a devout, virtuous, but rigid Anglican minister, and Allan, a married man for whom she feels a powerful physical attraction. She decides to choose Allan but, just before eloping with him, happens upon Besant giving a lecture in the Adelaide Town Hall. Overwhelmed by the power of the oratory and the content of the oration, she turns to Theosophy and its spiritual path. Vers la Lumière was published in Edinburgh in 1910. Lion's friend and fellow artist, Maude Wholohan, translated a slightly revised version into English, and the Melbourne publisher George Robertson released it under the title The Black Pearl in 1911.

Lion's next book, La Dévadâsi, was hailed as the first novel published in French in Australia. It is an exotic and fast-moving tale set in India, and draws on research that Lion undertook in late 1902 and early 1903. Again, the story hinges on powerful and illicit sexual urges. Nellie Hunter, a young Irishwoman, visits Chandannagar, where she is possessed by the spirit of a devadasi – or temple dancer – who, instead of chastely devoting her life to the goddess Kali, had had a relationship with Hunter’s great-great-uncle. An Adelaide reviewer referred to Lion's 'great ability as a writer of fiction', her 'powerful imagination', and 'her singular aptitude for devising dramatic situations'.

Les Dieux Interviennent ('The Gods Intervene') was completed in 1913, but the outbreak of war meant that Plon-Nourrit, Lion’s French publishers, did not release it until 1916. The novel was described as a 'stirring romance of the French Revolution'. The narrator, the sixteen-year-old Berthe-Angélique de Pémilhat du Roq, meets Maximilien Robespierre and tries to help Marie Antoinette escape execution. In February 1922, Lion signed a contract with Plon-Nourrit to publish a popular version of Les Dieux Interviennent in an edition of 20,000 copies. She died on 3 May, and the book was published posthumously later in the year in Paris, under the title of Pour Sauver la Reine ('To Save the Queen'), with the author named as Marie Léon [sic].
