= Cactus Park =

Park and garden in Occitanie, France

Coordinates: 43.3489°N 3.4195°E

Cactus Park (8 hectares) is a commercial park with a botanical garden containing thousands of cactus and succulents, as well as a modest animal collection including yaks, goats, sheep, ducks, etc. It is located in Bessan, Hérault, Languedoc-Roussillon, France, and open daily in the warmer months; an admission fee is charged.

== See also ==
- List of botanical gardens in France
