= Achille Maffre de Baugé =

- Born: 16 March 1855; Marseillan
- Died: 1 July 1928
- Writing career
- Genre: Poetry
- Notable works: Dièzes et Bémols (1873), Terre d'Oc (1908)

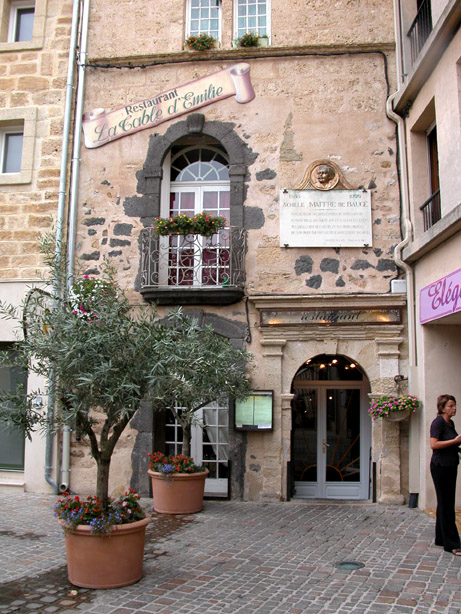
The house where Achille Maffre de Baugé was born, in his hometown of Marseillan.

Achille Maffre de Baugé (16 March 1855 – 1 July 1928) was an Occitan poet and writer, a native of Marseillan in the French département of l'Hérault.

A friend of Nobel Prize winner Frédéric Mistral, he is best known for Dièzes et Bémols (1873) (his first collection of verse) and Terre d'Oc (1908). He was a collaborator on the monthly review magazine Chimère, of which twenty issues appeared, a large number of which are now lost.

On the front of the Marseillan house in which he was born there is a portrait of de Baugé and a stone plaque with an extract from his poem Marseillan (from Terre d'Oc) glorifying his village:

Poussière de soldats, cendre de troubadours,
Pendant mille ans notre âme en ta glèbe est entrée,
Tes roses sont mes sœurs, et tes vignes dorées
Du sang dont bat mon cœur se gonfleront toujours

A primary school in Marseillan has been named "Maffre de Baugé" in his honour as well as a street in the town.

His grandson is the writer and member of the European Parliament (1979 to 1989), Emmanuel Maffre-Baugé (1921 to 2007).

== Works ==
- Dièzes et bémols, poésies, 1870-1873 (1873)
- Sonnets : L'Attente. L'Amitié. Prométhée. Accalmie (1873)
- Le Narghiléh (1883) Online text
- Chères amours (1892)
- Aux Arènes (1895)
- Les Gants blancs (1896)
- Sirvente de mai (1897)
- L'Oiseau bleu (1901)
- L'Iris bleu (1907)
- Terre d'Oc (1908)
- Le Promontoire (1927)

Talks

- J. Barbey d'Aurevilly, 25 April 1889
- Du Sens international chez les provincialistes, discours prononcé au banquet des félibres à Cette, 31 May 1896
- Molière et le régionalisme, discours prononcé à la Grange-des-Prés, 9 August 1897
