= Marseillan, Hérault =

Marseillan
- Commune
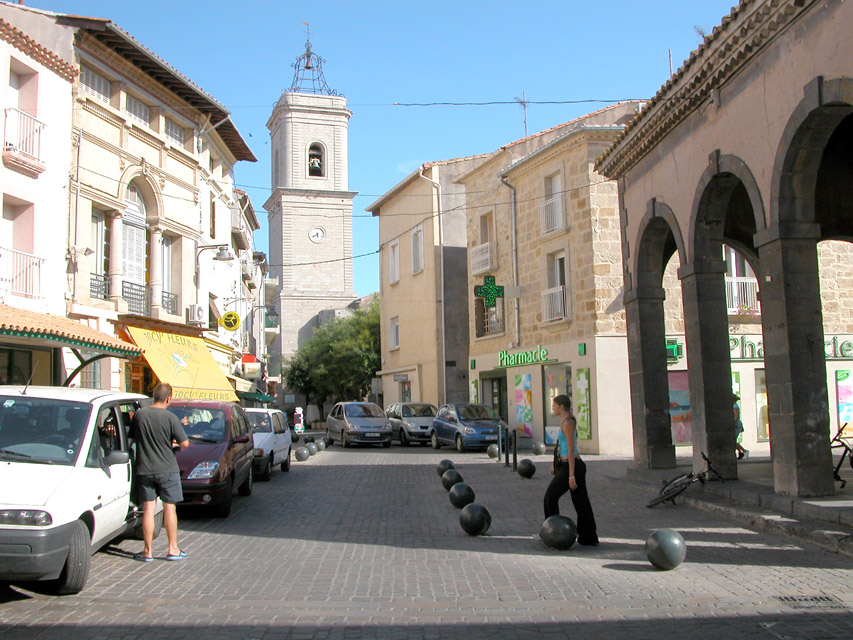
- Marseillan village

- Coat of arms
- Location of Marseillan
- Location within France Location within Occitanie
- Coordinates: 43°21′26″N 3°31′42″E
- Country: France
- Region: Occitania
- Department: Hérault
- Arrondissement: Montpellier
- Canton: Agde
- Intercommunality: CA Sète Agglopôle Méditerranée

Government
  - Mayor (2020–2026): Yves Michel (DVD)
- Area^{1}: 51.71 km^{2} (19.97 sq mi)
- Elevation: 3 m (9.8 ft)
- Highest elevation: 33 m (108 ft)
- Lowest elevation: 0 m (0 ft)
- Population (2023): 8,414
  - Density: 162.7/km^{2} (421.4/sq mi)
- Time zone: UTC+01:00 (CET)
  - Summer (DST): UTC+02:00 (CEST)
- INSEE/Postal code: 34150 /34340
- ^{1} French Land Register data, which excludes lakes, ponds, glaciers > 1 km^{2} (0.386 sq mi or 247 acres) and river estuaries.

Marseillan (French pronunciation: [maʁsɛjɑ̃]; Occitan: Massilhan) is a resort town and commune in the Hérault department in southern France. As of 2023, the population of Marseillan is 8,414.

The port of Marseillan is a protected heritage site, and the altar and organ in the church are also listed. There has been virtually no new building in the heart of the village since the 17th century, and many of the houses date to the 12th century.

== History ==
There is dispute as to who exactly founded the village. Marseille claims that honour, largely due to the similarity between the names of the two towns. But both names are derived from the Greco-Phoenician Massaliotes who extended trading routes from the eastern Mediterranean.

The Massaliotes certainly founded Marseille around 600 BC and, shortly after, Agde. Thus, Agde is said to be the second oldest town in France. The foundation of Marseillan, however, is less clear. As Agde is only 8 km (5.0 mi) away it seems most likely that the Agatois were the founders. In any case, the origins of all three places lie with the Greco-Phoenicians. Either way, Marseillan is one of the oldest villages in France.

The Romans established the port, and with the Via Domitia running close they also established a rest and recreation centre. Many legionnaires took their discharge at Marseillan, having been granted land there. Vineyards were established on many of these allotments.

The centre of the village lies within the lines of the old walls. Until 1970, vineyards extended from the main boulevards built outside of the walls around 1870.

== Geography ==
Marseillan sits on a large lagoon, the Étang de Thau, and is the southern entry to the Canal du Midi. It lies some 50 km (31 mi) west of Montpellier. Marseillan-Plage station has rail connections to Agde, Sète, Narbonne, Montpellier and Avignon.

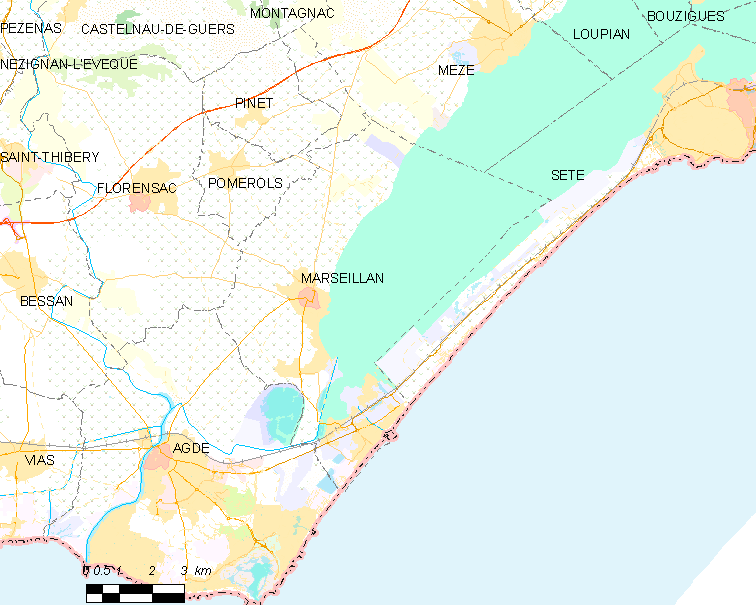
Map

=== Climate ===
Marseillan enjoys an equable climate. Sheltered by the mountains of the Massif Central the weather systems from the north are seldom a problem. Marseillan has some 300 sunny days a year, and ground frosts (at worst) in mid-winter. From time-to-time a little snow falls, but this only dusts the ground and is gone by mid-day. Marseillanais make day trips into the mountains to experience snowballing and to make snowmen.

The prevailing winds are from the south-west, and south. Marseillan receives the hot winds from the Sahara but does not suffer the pink sand that those winds carry out to sea. The Mistral blows down the Rhone valley and, although a northerly wind is sometimes referred to as a “mistral” it has none of the severity nor persistence of the true version.

Climate data for Marseillan (1981–2010 averages, extremes 1986−present)
Month	Jan	Feb	Mar	Apr	May	Jun	Jul	Aug	Sep	Oct	Nov	Dec	Year
Record high °C (°F)	21.0 (69.8)	23.6 (74.5)	27.7 (81.9)	29.6 (85.3)	32.9 (91.2)	41.1 (106.0)	38.3 (100.9)	38.5 (101.3)	34.4 (93.9)	32.6 (90.7)	25.7 (78.3)	20.9 (69.6)	41.1 (106.0)
Mean daily maximum °C (°F)	11.7 (53.1)	12.6 (54.7)	15.6 (60.1)	17.6 (63.7)	21.4 (70.5)	25.5 (77.9)	28.3 (82.9)	28.0 (82.4)	24.2 (75.6)	20.1 (68.2)	15.2 (59.4)	12.2 (54.0)	19.4 (66.9)
Daily mean °C (°F)	7.8 (46.0)	8.5 (47.3)	11.2 (52.2)	13.3 (55.9)	17.2 (63.0)	20.7 (69.3)	23.3 (73.9)	23.2 (73.8)	19.6 (67.3)	16.4 (61.5)	11.4 (52.5)	8.3 (46.9)	15.1 (59.2)
Mean daily minimum °C (°F)	3.8 (38.8)	4.3 (39.7)	6.7 (44.1)	9.1 (48.4)	13.0 (55.4)	16.0 (60.8)	18.4 (65.1)	18.4 (65.1)	15.0 (59.0)	12.6 (54.7)	7.6 (45.7)	4.5 (40.1)	10.8 (51.4)
Record low °C (°F)	−8.5 (16.7)	−8.6 (16.5)	−8.4 (16.9)	0.3 (32.5)	4.6 (40.3)	7.4 (45.3)	10.4 (50.7)	9.3 (48.7)	6.5 (43.7)	0.5 (32.9)	−6.4 (20.5)	−6.9 (19.6)	−8.6 (16.5)
Average precipitation mm (inches)	55.9 (2.20)	50.6 (1.99)	32.9 (1.30)	45.0 (1.77)	43.8 (1.72)	21.2 (0.83)	10.0 (0.39)	21.7 (0.85)	67.8 (2.67)	95.8 (3.77)	64.7 (2.55)	45.8 (1.80)	555.2 (21.86)
Average precipitation days (≥ 1.0 mm)	5.4	4.2	3.7	5.2	4.7	3.3	2.2	2.8	3.9	5.9	5.4	4.8	51.4
Source: Meteociel

== Economy ==
Marseillan's economy is founded on fish, wines, trade and visitors. This has always been so because from its foundation Marseillan has been a major trading centre, a port and a stopping-off point for travellers.

=== Trade ===
When the village was founded there was a clean inland waterway paralleling the Mediterranean - described as "une petite mer intérieure et tranquille". Therefore sailors could make their way in safety from the Rhône to Marseillan. Thus from the beginning Marseillan was a trading post.

Over the years this waterway silted up, forming the series of Etangs, the largest of which being the Étang de Thau, but then the Canal du Midi opened and Marseillan, as the Entreport, was a major beneficiary.

It follows that from the very early days Marseillan had the four bases of trade that exist today.

Much later Marseillan was linked by the Rhone-Sète Canal to the river Rhone and by the Canal du Midi to Toulouse and thence to the Atlantic at Bordeaux. Its location means that Marseillan became a crucial link in the network of canals that still encircle France.

=== Fishing ===
The Étang de Thau is shallow, with a bottom of foot-deep mud. The conditions are perfect for shellfish and 18 different species are fished from the Etang. As the water is Class A they can be eaten straightaway. Most notable are the oysters and the mussels.

Bouziques oysters, from the Étang, provide about 10% of France's annual oyster consumption. They are cultivated from oyster tables with one farmer able to bring up a family comfortably on the production from two tables.

Mussels are taken from the rich band of mussel-friendly water that runs along the Mediterranean coast from Marseillan to Marseilles. Marseillan fishermen work 3 km from the shore, with the Agatois in larger boats fishing further out.

Sea fish are also caught in the Étang. They are carried in by the force of the current generated by the narrowness of the canals. (There are no tides on the Mediterranean, but the mass of water shifts dependent on the prevailing wind. Thus the level of the Étang is constantly shifting.)

=== Wines ===
Table wines are produced, with the most acceptable being Picpoul de Pinet - an attractive white wine with a slight green tint and a little sparkle. About a million bottles are produced annually by the cave co-operative.

The Noilly Prat company came to Marseillan in 1853, and is still producing its vermouths on the same site. Mr Noilly had created the vermouth in Lyon in 1813. His son, with an English partner (Mr Prat), came to Marseillan to commercialise their product because the local wines were very suitable and the climate was ideal.

=== Visitors ===
A popular stopping point on the long routes along the Mediterranean shore, Marseillan has provided travellers with a welcome since the village was founded.

Today much of the village's prosperity comes from the summer visitors: holidaymakers in Marseillan Plage; day visitors to Marseillan Ville; houseboat visitors from the Canal du Midi and owners of holiday homes.

To some degree even those northerners who have settled permanently are visitors. Certainly they make a substantial contribution to the local economy.

== Population ==
Historical population

Year	Pop.	±% p.a.
1793	3,210	—
1800	3,210	+0.00%
1806	3,441	+1.16%
1821	3,815	+0.69%
1831	3,687	−0.34%
1836	3,691	+0.02%
1841	3,504	−1.03%
1846	3,628	+0.70%
1851	3,781	+0.83%
1856	3,888	+0.56%
1861	3,933	+0.23%
1866	3,972	+0.20%
1872	3,981	+0.04%
1876	3,994	+0.08%
1881	4,065	+0.35%
1886	3,987	−0.39%
1891	4,634	+3.05%
1896	4,218	−1.86%
1901	4,722	+2.28%

Year	Pop.	±% p.a.
1906	4,732	+0.04%
1911	4,724	−0.03%
1921	4,598	−0.27%
1926	4,318	−1.25%
1931	4,072	−1.17%
1936	3,664	−2.09%
1946	3,334	−0.94%
1954	3,421	+0.32%
1962	3,394	−0.10%
1968	3,579	+0.89%
1975	3,483	−0.39%
1982	4,039	+2.14%
1990	4,950	+2.57%
1999	6,199	+2.53%
2007	7,565	+2.52%
2012	7,884	+0.83%
2017	7,778	−0.27%
2023	8,414	+1.32%

Source: EHESS and INSEE (1968-2023)

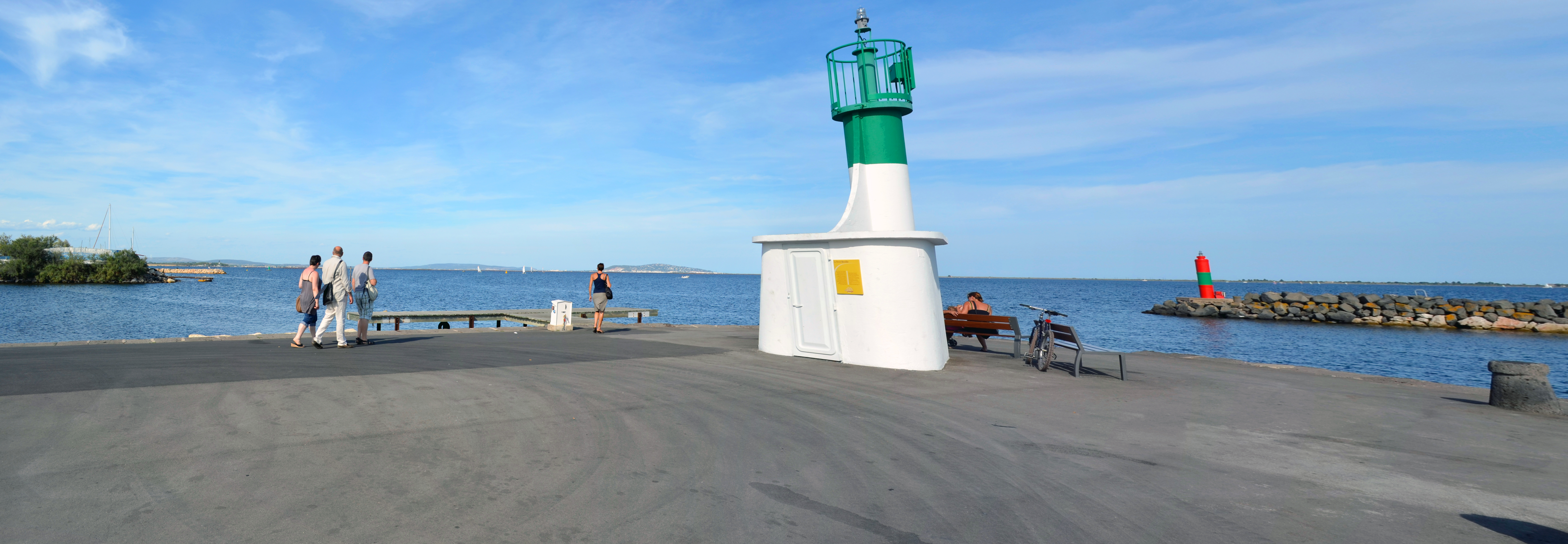
Panoramic view of Marseillan harbour

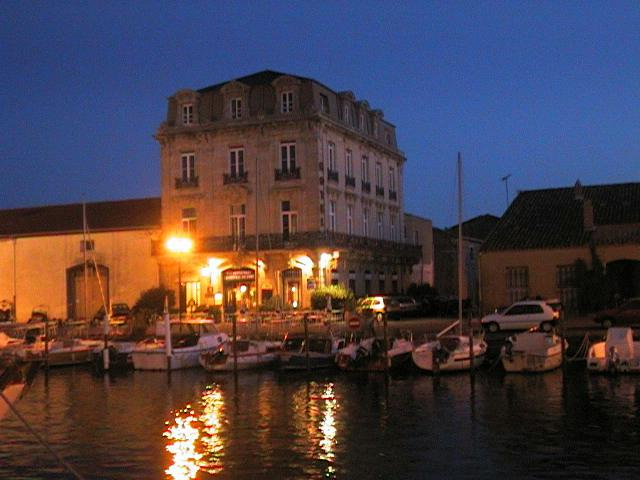
Marseillan harbour at night

== Buildings ==
=== Fortification ===
The old village has remained largely unchanged throughout the centuries, and today's village is almost identical in shape to the one known in the Middle Ages. This is because Marseillan was a fortified village until the late 18th century.

From the second century BC Marseillan was protected by earthworks, but by Roman times it had a timber stockade. This was sufficient until Simon de Montfort and his army passed through during the Cathar Crusade. New stone fortifications then replaced the timber.

The Château sat foursquare in the centre of the village, behind its own walls, whilst the village walls were themselves four-and-a-half metres high. There were four gates, six watchtowers and the village was moated.

=== Habitation ===
Most of the village houses are back-to-back. Typically they are of three storeys, with a stable on the ground floor, living space on the first and fodder stored on the second. The rear rooms are without light or ventilation. With the houses protected from mosquitoes by zinc screens, and in the heat of the Midi, it must have been barely tolerable even to people born into the village. Today the mosquitoes have been eradicated, but it is still uncomfortable in the rear rooms in high summer. Most houses in the old village are small or very small. Their staircases are narrow, and twisty.

Some larger homes were owned by the entrepreneurs who typically moved out of the village and into the main boulevards from around 1870.

These new large homes were also working houses. Maisons de maître and maisons de vigneron have no particular architectural style, but they are all of two or three storeys, with the ground floor a working area. All have double doors to allow entry to the horse-drawn transport. Sometimes there was direct access from the rear of the house to the vineyards. Almost always there was a small kitchen garden and a pump.

=== Construction ===
Construction is typically of torchis bricks made from sun dried clay and straw. There are no foundations because a metre down is the water table. Every house in Marseillan has rising damp. This is actually essential to the survival of the houses since they have to be built to withstand the climate changes.

In the winter the ground expands, and in summer it contracts. The houses have to be able to flex to cope with these changes. Therefore lime mixed with sand from the beach was used rather than cement (which hardly flexes), and cracks in the façade are normal. Some houses are built from soft limestone which was taken from the vineyards. Basalt, hard volcanic stone, is commonly used for door and window frames.

It is not uncommon to find that houses have been adapted and renovated over the ages and many have several different building materials co-existing within the one building. Renovation is not a modern initiative, Marseillan houses have been renovated and adapted since they were first built.

Today bathrooms have been added, but piped water and sanitation have only been in the village since 1958. Most houses had their private pump, however.

== Of interest ==
The Marseillanais have always taken their time over decisions, but have still been leaders in many areas. A hospital existed in 1100 and is still treating patients today (having had several homes over the years!). The maire (mayor) was elected in the village 200 years before this was required by Royal decree. Public schooling started in the mid-18th century. The school was co-educational from 1870 (but not the classes). The oldest stone Marianne in France was erected in 1878, following a wooden bust created in 1876. Marseillan voted to become secular some 10 years before the country as a whole. Women were allowed into one designated cafe from 1870 — again earlier than most other towns and villages.

== Notable Persons ==
- Achille Maffre de Baugé (1855-1928), poet
- Marie Lion (1855-1922), French–Australian novelist
- Marcel Barral (known as Marcel Viala) (1912-1997), poet
- Pierre Deley, one of the first pilots of the Aéropostale and grandnephew of Général Roques
- General Pierre Auguste Roques (28 December 1856 - 1920), founder of French military aviation, Minister of War 1916. Originally buried in Marseillan, his remains now lie in the Hôtel des Invalides, Paris
- Christian Beullac, (29 November 1923 - 16 June 1986), politician
- Jean-Pierre Hortoland (born 28 May 1947), rugby union player

== See also ==
- Communes of the Hérault department
- Marselan
