= Albas, Aude =

Commune in Occitanie, France

Albas
- Commune
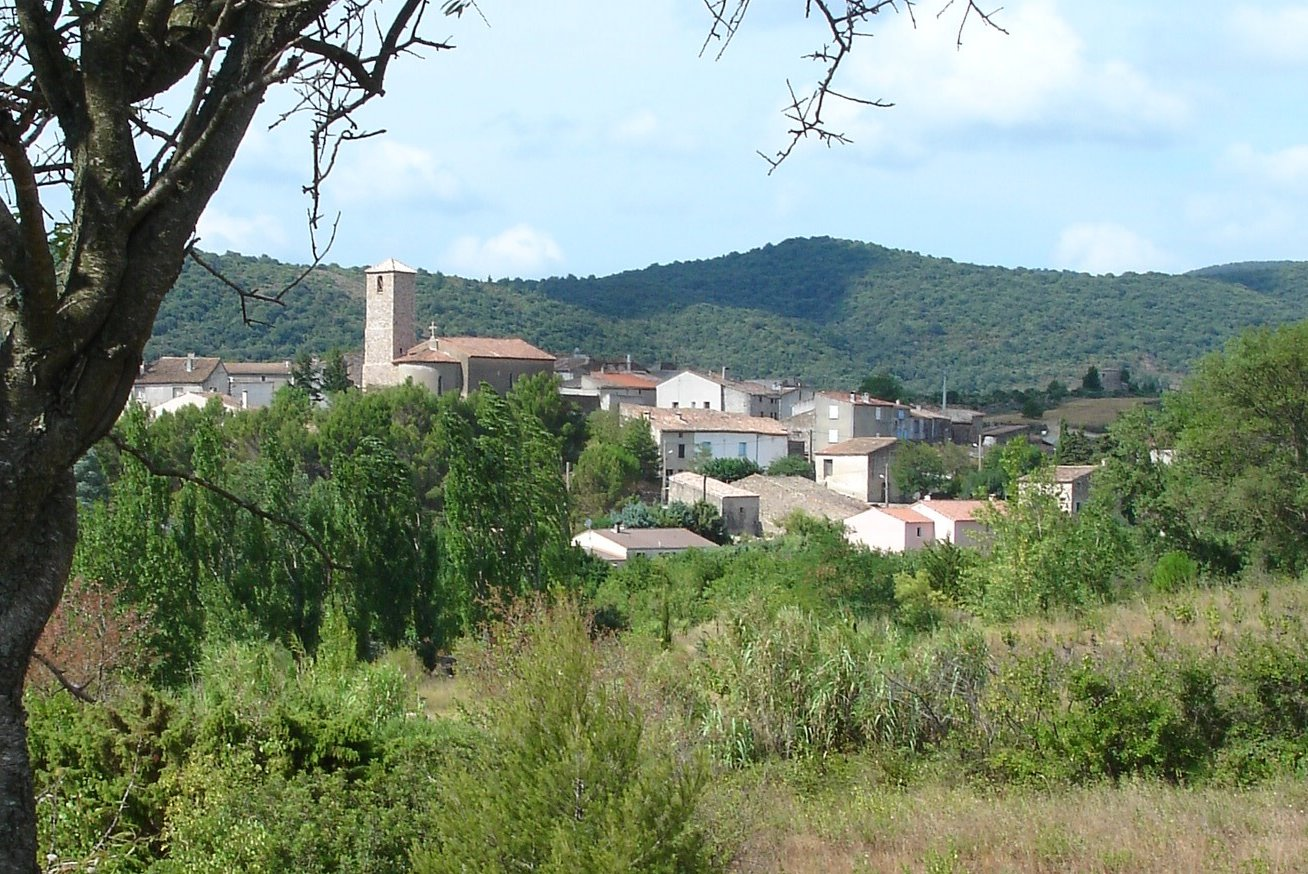
- A general view of Albas

- Coat of arms
- Location of Albas
- Location within France Location within Occitanie
- Coordinates: 43°00′25″N 2°44′06″E
- Country: France
- Region: Occitania
- Department: Aude
- Arrondissement: Narbonne
- Canton: Les Corbières
- Intercommunality: Région Lézignanaise, Corbières et Minervois

Government
  - Mayor (2020–2026): Jean-Claude Montlaur
- Area^{1}: 22.69 km^{2} (8.76 sq mi)
- Elevation: 343 m (1,125 ft)
- Highest elevation: 533 m (1,749 ft)
- Lowest elevation: 189 m (620 ft)
- Population (2023): 87
  - Density: 3.8/km^{2} (9.9/sq mi)
- Time zone: UTC+01:00 (CET)
  - Summer (DST): UTC+02:00 (CEST)
- INSEE/Postal code: 11006 /11360
- ^{1} French Land Register data, which excludes lakes, ponds, glaciers > 1 km^{2} (0.386 sq mi or 247 acres) and river estuaries.

Albas (French pronunciation: [albas]; Occitan: Albàs) is a commune in the Aude department in the Occitanie region of southern France.

== Geography ==
=== Location ===
Albas is located some 50 km south-east of Carcassonne and 25 km west of Port-la-Nouvelle. It can be accessed from the east by road D40 which runs north-west from Durban-Corbières then turns left to enter the commune from the east. The D40 continues west to the town of Albas then continues to the west through the heart of the commune and on to Villerouge-Termenès. The commune can also be accessed from Cascastel-des-Corbières in the south-east by road D106 which runs north-west to the town of Albas. There are numerous countries roads criss-crossing the commune. The landscape is unusual with farmland along the east–west central axis of the commune but most of the commune is forested hills.

The village is built at an average altitude 270 metres, the town hall is 250m above sea level. There are no other villages or hamlets in the commune.

There are numerous streams densely covering the commune. Those in the north flow north to the Nielle river which eventually flows to the Orbieu which joins the Aude near Saint-Nazaire-d'Aude. Those in the south flow south to the Berre river which flows to the sea.

=== Geology ===
The commune is in the Corbières Massif at the foot of Mount Tauch in the Corbières AOC.

The Albas sedimentary series has been the subject of numerous geological studies as the different layers extend from the Mesozoic to Quaternary periods and dinosaur fossil eggs have been found. The landscape varies from Garrigue or scrubland to holly oak forests.

== History ==
Dating from the late Iron Age, there is on the "Roc de Carla" a modest oppidum. Extraction of Iron Ore was being done in the 4th and 3rd centuries BC. The Romans named the place ALBARES probably because of the silver poplar leaves they found in the vicinity of the present village.

In a deed from the year 963 concerning donations from the nearby village of Fontjoncouse at Aymeric, the Archbishop of Narbonne, wrote the words VILLA ALBARES (ALBAS). In 1196, the Viscountess Ermengarde of Narbonne donated in her will the castrum or "fortified place" of ALBAS to a military order. His nephew Pierre de Lara, however, would not give any part of Albas to the Templars or the Hospitallers orders. A Commander Saint Jean is mentioned at Albas in 1243. In 1226, Guillaume de Laroque de Carcassonne sold his possessions at Albas to the Abbey of Lagrasse. In the course of the 13th century, the Count of Foix was Lord then, in 1271, Aymeric, Viscount of Narbonne became the rightful lord of the Castrum of Albaribus Ferreriarum (the Albas Iron Mines).

The church is dedicated to Saint Paul, who evangelised in Narbonne.

In 1503 Jean de Cascastel of a neighbouring village was cited as lord. In 1523, Jean of Narbonne was said to hold the lordship of Albas from the King. During this century, Rogier de Lubes, Bailiff of Albas, organized an intercommunal association to defend the interests of the people ruined by the Franco-Spanish wars. The village built of adobe was destroyed and the residents resettled in the castrum.

In 1576, the Parlement of Toulouse distributed the property of the Bellisens family and Albas went to Pons Thomas Joseph Davisard. In the 17th century, Cardinal Richelieu decided to reclaim the Roussillon and Narbonne became a stronghold at the disposal of the French. In an order dated 6 May 1642, Louis XII put Albas on the list of localities dependent on Narbonne. At the beginning of the 18th century, Albas was part of the barony of Talairan and came under the spiritual authority of the Order of Malta. This is why the current crest of Albas is a white Maltese cross on red background.

During the Revolution, the property of the Davisard family was confiscated and the Albas Iron Works became a commune. In 1830, the farming of Garouille (a dwarf oak that provided vermilion dye) and charcoal production was the main economic activity of Albas, with alfalfa and livestock (goats for milk, sheep for meat, mules for travel). The iron mining which merely collected the unrefined ore (ferrières) in the Middle Ages gave way at the beginning of the 20th century to mining on the Lacamp plateau. Iron was carried by trolleys and the small railway linking Durban-Corbières to Tuchan until 1930. The railway was abandoned in favour of the first trucks then the mines became too expensive to operate and they were abandoned in 1930. The mine shafts were closed and only a few insiders knew how to get in by entering discrete tunnels. The remains of a pink marble quarry can be seen on the road to Cascastel near the village.

=== Heraldry ===
Arms of Albas	Blazon: Gules, a cross of Malta argent bordure Or.

== Administration ==
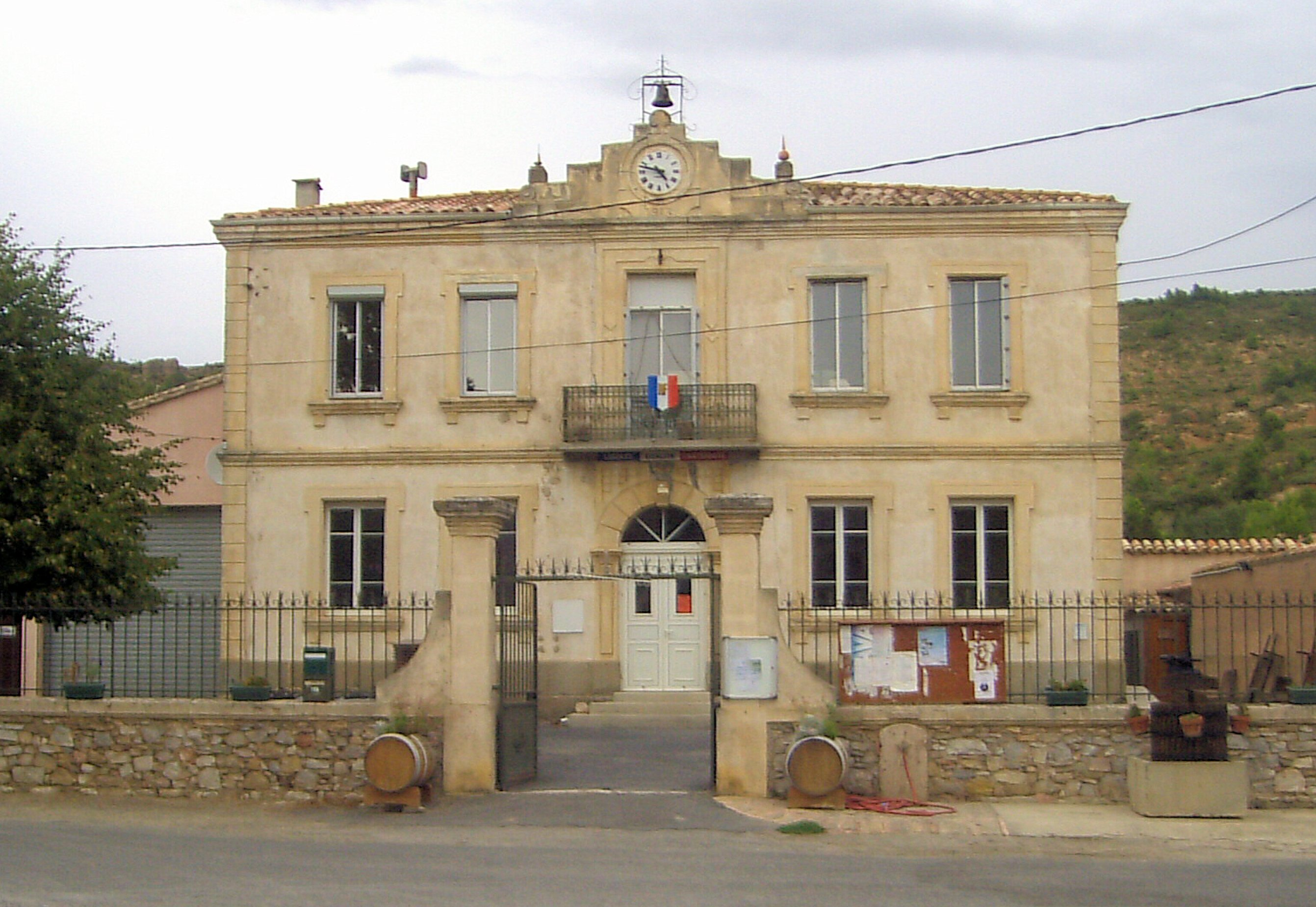
The Town Hall

List of Successive Mayors of Albas

From	To	Name	Party
2001	2026	Jean-Claude Montlaur	PS

== Population ==
The inhabitants of the commune are known as Albassiens or Albassiennes in French.

Historical population
Year	Pop.	±% p.a.
1968	72	—
1975	59	−2.80%
1982	72	+2.89%
1990	70	−0.35%
1999	59	−1.88%
2007	78	+3.55%
2012	72	−1.59%
2017	77	+1.35%
2023	87	+2.06%
Source: INSEE

Population: Winemakers, Animal husbandry, masons, retired from various countries of Europe, summer holiday families.

== Economy ==
Two flocks of sheep have opened an alternative to wine which was the dominant activity of the 20th century.

At the end of the 19th century the village had 600 residents, a school, and three priests lived in the capélagne (Rectory). Before the vinesyards Cereals were grown and lucerne from Albas was renowned.

== Notable People linked to the commune ==
- Regis Barailla is a politician and a member of the Socialist party, general counsel for Aude, and a member from the second electoral district of Aude
- Alain Montlaur was born on 27 March 1950 in Albas. A Rugby player. Champion of France in rugby in 1979 with Narbonne and finalist in 1974. A Flanker (1.83 m tall and 84 kg).

== See also ==
- Corbières AOC
- Communes of the Aude department
