= Massac =

Massac may refer to several places in the United States:

- Massac, Kentucky
- Massac County, Illinois
- Fort Massac, Massac County, Illinois

Massac is the name or part of the name of several communes in France:

- Massac, Aude, in the Aude département
- Massac, Charente-Maritime, in the Charente-Maritime département
- Massac-Séran, in the Tarn département
- Massiac, Communes of the Cantal département, is the origin of the "Massac" name in Illinois.
