= Thézan =

Thézan is the name of two French communes:

- Thézan-lès-Béziers in the Hérault department
- Thézan-des-Corbières in the Aude department
