= Vignevieille =

Commune in Occitanie, France

- Commune
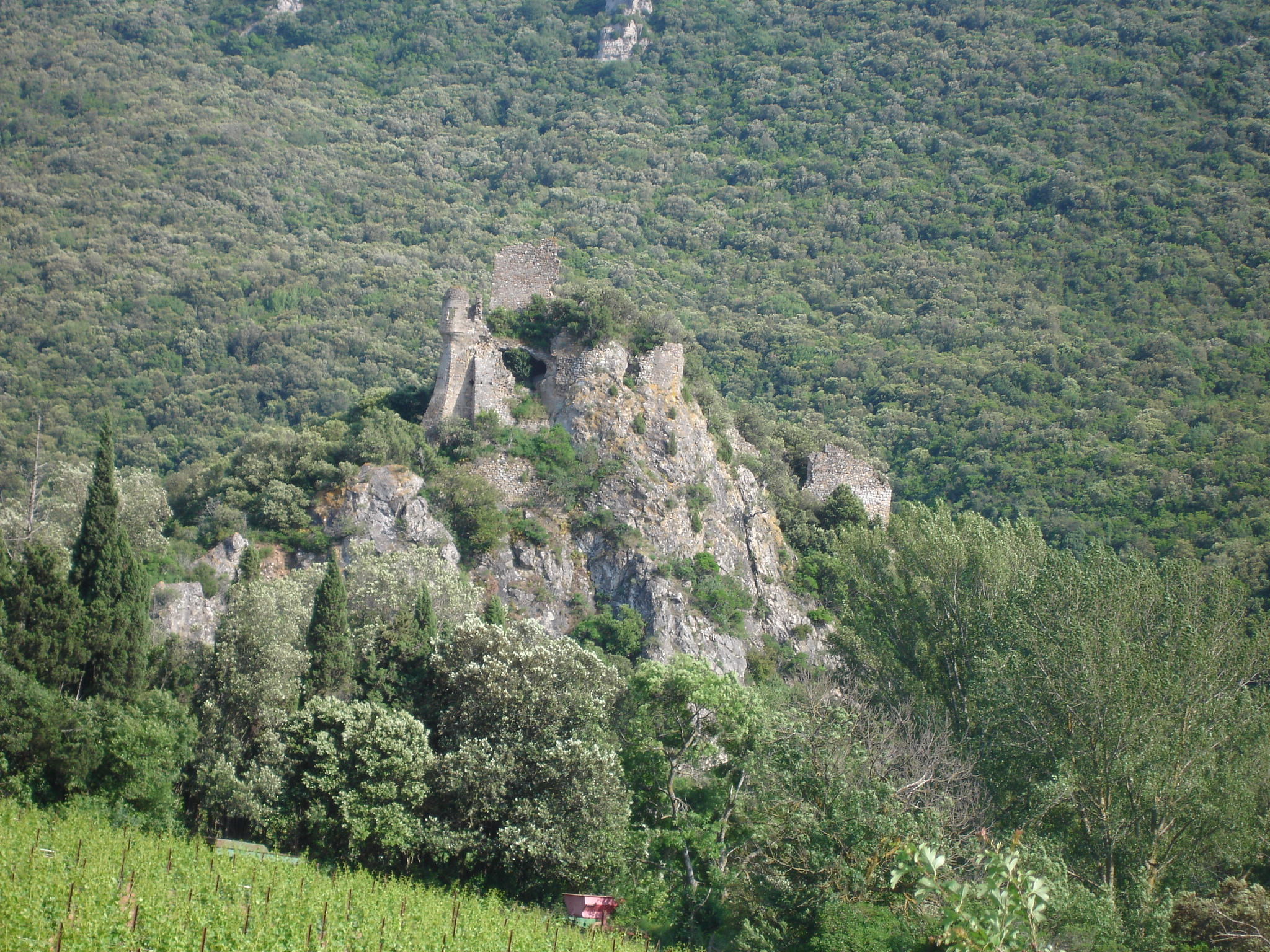
- Ruins of the chateau of Durfort

- Coat of arms
- Location of Vignevieille
- Location within France Location within Occitanie
- Coordinates: 43°00′24″N 2°31′30″E
- Country: France
- Region: Occitania
- Department: Aude
- Arrondissement: Narbonne
- Canton: Les Corbières
- Intercommunality: Région Lézignanaise, Corbières et Minervois

Government
  - Mayor (2020–2026): Olivier Vernede
- Area^{1}: 16.72 km^{2} (6.46 sq mi)
- Elevation: 228 m (748 ft)
- Highest elevation: 694 m (2,277 ft)
- Lowest elevation: 190 m (620 ft)
- Population (2023): 107
  - Density: 6.40/km^{2} (16.6/sq mi)
- Time zone: UTC+01:00 (CET)
  - Summer (DST): UTC+02:00 (CEST)
- INSEE/Postal code: 11409 /11330
- ^{1} French Land Register data, which excludes lakes, ponds, glaciers > 1 km^{2} (0.386 sq mi or 247 acres) and river estuaries.

Vignevieille (French pronunciation: [viɲ.vjɛj]; Languedocien: Vinhavièlha) is a commune in the Aude department in southern France.

== Geography ==
The commune is located in the Corbières Massif.

The village lies on the right bank of the Orbieu, which flows northeast through the commune.

== Population ==
Historical population
Year	Pop.	±% p.a.
1968	112	—
1975	95	−2.32%
1982	78	−2.78%
1990	75	−0.49%
1999	72	−0.45%
2007	95	+3.53%
2012	100	+1.03%
2017	105	+0.98%
2023	107	+0.31%
Source: INSEE

Its inhabitants are called Vignevieillais in French.

== Sights ==
- Ruins of the Château de Durfort
- Fountain built in 1897. The round basin is of pink marble from the Pic de Berles quarry situated in the communes of Vignevieille and Salza. At the centre is a column with the inscription: République Française, 1897, Jouve. The fountain runs permanently, even in drought.

== See also ==
- Corbières AOC
- Communes of the Aude department
