= Maisons, Aude =

Commune in Occitanie, France

Maisons
- Commune
- Coat of arms
- Location of Maisons
- Location within France Location within Occitanie
- Coordinates: 42°55′41″N 2°38′01″E
- Country: France
- Region: Occitania
- Department: Aude
- Arrondissement: Narbonne
- Canton: Les Corbières

Government
  - Mayor (2020–2026): Florie Blanc
- Area^{1}: 12.15 km^{2} (4.69 sq mi)
- Elevation: 320 m (1,050 ft)
- Highest elevation: 891 m (2,923 ft)
- Lowest elevation: 280 m (920 ft)
- Population (2023): 59
  - Density: 4.9/km^{2} (13/sq mi)
- Time zone: UTC+01:00 (CET)
  - Summer (DST): UTC+02:00 (CEST)
- INSEE/Postal code: 11213 /11330
- ^{1} French Land Register data, which excludes lakes, ponds, glaciers > 1 km^{2} (0.386 sq mi or 247 acres) and river estuaries.

Maisons (French pronunciation: [mɛzɔ̃]; Occitan: Omes) is a commune in the Aude department in southern France.

== Population ==
Historical population
Year	Pop.	±% p.a.
1968	111	—
1975	79	−4.74%
1982	66	−2.54%
1990	61	−0.98%
1999	56	−0.95%
2007	43	−3.25%
2012	42	−0.47%
2017	46	+1.84%
2023	59	+4.24%
Source: INSEE

== See also ==
- Corbières AOC
- Communes of the Aude department
