= Canton of Les Corbières =

Coordinates: 43.14°N 2.70°E

- Canton
- Situation of the canton of Les Corbières in the department of Aude
- Country: France
- Region: Occitania
- Department: Aude
- No. of communes: {{{nbcomm}}}
- Population (2023): 16,732
- INSEE code: 1107

The canton of Les Corbières (French: canton des Corbières) is an administrative division of the Aude department, southern France. It was created at the French canton reorganisation which came into effect in March 2015. Its seat is in Fabrezan.

It consists of the following communes:

1. Albas
2. Albières
3. Auriac
4. Bouisse
5. Boutenac
6. Camplong-d'Aude
7. Cascastel-des-Corbières
8. Coustouge
9. Cucugnan
10. Davejean
11. Dernacueillette
12. Duilhac-sous-Peyrepertuse
13. Durban-Corbières
14. Embres-et-Castelmaure
15. Fabrezan
16. Félines-Termenès
17. Ferrals-les-Corbières
18. Fontcouverte
19. Fontjoncouse
20. Fraissé-des-Corbières
21. Jonquières
22. Lagrasse
23. Lairière
24. Lanet
25. Laroque-de-Fa
26. Luc-sur-Orbieu
27. Maisons
28. Massac
29. Montgaillard
30. Montjoi
31. Montséret
32. Mouthoumet
33. Padern
34. Palairac
35. Paziols
36. Quintillan
37. Ribaute
38. Rouffiac-des-Corbières
39. Saint-André-de-Roquelongue
40. Saint-Jean-de-Barrou
41. Saint-Laurent-de-la-Cabrerisse
42. Saint-Martin-des-Puits
43. Saint-Pierre-des-Champs
44. Salza
45. Soulatgé
46. Talairan
47. Termes
48. Thézan-des-Corbières
49. Tournissan
50. Tuchan
51. Vignevieille
52. Villeneuve-les-Corbières
53. Villerouge-Termenès
54. Villesèque-des-Corbières
