= Embres-et-Castelmaure =

Commune in Occitanie, France

- Commune
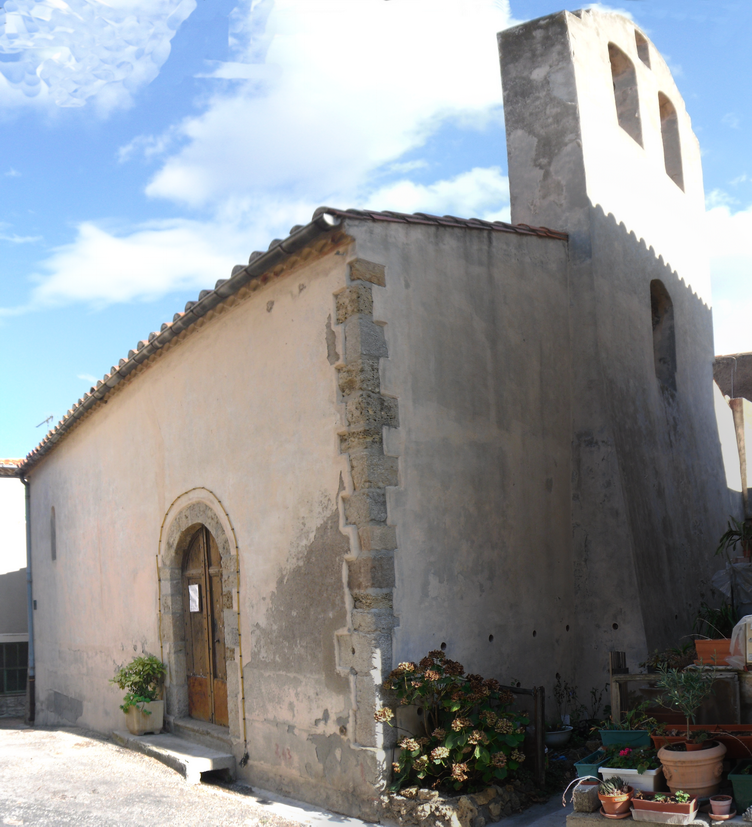
- The church in Embres-et-Castelmaure

- Coat of arms
- Location of Embres-et-Castelmaure
- Location within France Location within Occitanie
- Coordinates: 42°56′26″N 2°48′51″E
- Country: France
- Region: Occitania
- Department: Aude
- Arrondissement: Narbonne
- Canton: Les Corbières

Government
  - Mayor (2020–2026): Gerard Benezis
- Area^{1}: 32.2 km^{2} (12.4 sq mi)
- Elevation: 210 m (690 ft)
- Highest elevation: 709 m (2,326 ft)
- Lowest elevation: 138 m (453 ft)
- Population (2023): 165
  - Density: 5.12/km^{2} (13.3/sq mi)
- Time zone: UTC+01:00 (CET)
  - Summer (DST): UTC+02:00 (CEST)
- INSEE/Postal code: 11125 /11360
- ^{1} French Land Register data, which excludes lakes, ponds, glaciers > 1 km^{2} (0.386 sq mi or 247 acres) and river estuaries.

Embres-et-Castelmaure is a commune in the Aude department in southern France.

== Population ==
Historical population
Year	Pop.	±% p.a.
1968	224	—
1975	184	−2.77%
1982	192	+0.61%
1990	169	−1.58%
1999	142	−1.92%
2007	149	+0.60%
2012	156	+0.92%
2017	152	−0.52%
2023	165	+1.38%
Source: INSEE

== See also ==
- Corbières AOC
- Communes of the Aude department
