= Palairac =

Commune in Occitanie, France

- Commune
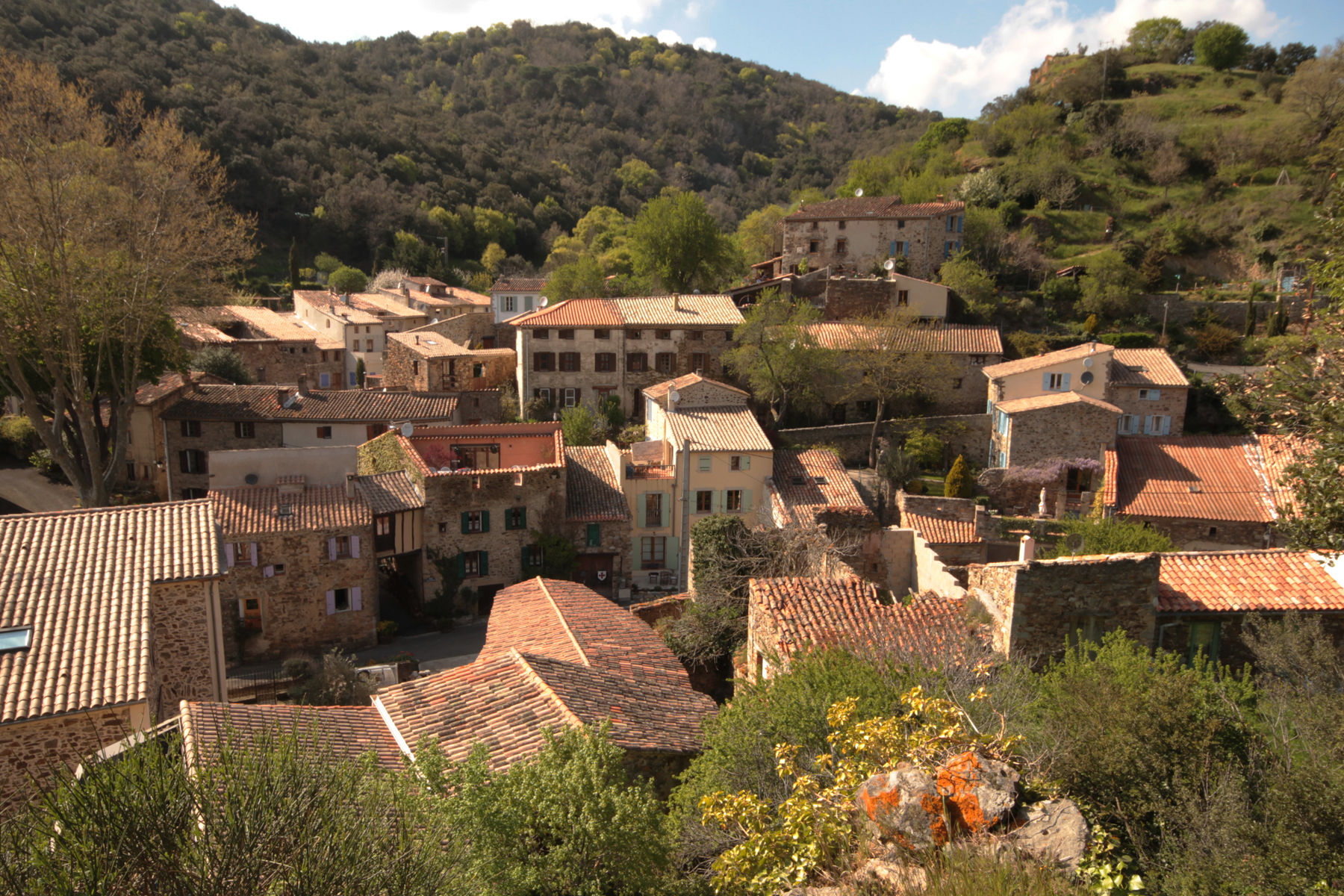
- A general view of Palairac

- Coat of arms
- Location of Palairac
- Location within France Location within Occitanie
- Coordinates: 42°57′30″N 2°39′44″E
- Country: France
- Region: Occitania
- Department: Aude
- Arrondissement: Narbonne
- Canton: Les Corbières

Government
  - Mayor (2024–2026): Bernard Colombat
- Area^{1}: 17.93 km^{2} (6.92 sq mi)
- Elevation: 266 m (873 ft)
- Highest elevation: 633 m (2,077 ft)
- Lowest elevation: 252 m (827 ft)
- Population (2023): 33
  - Density: 1.8/km^{2} (4.8/sq mi)
- Time zone: UTC+01:00 (CET)
  - Summer (DST): UTC+02:00 (CEST)
- INSEE/Postal code: 11271 /11330
- ^{1} French Land Register data, which excludes lakes, ponds, glaciers > 1 km^{2} (0.386 sq mi or 247 acres) and river estuaries.

Palairac (French pronunciation: [palɛʁak]) is a commune in the Aude department in southern France.

== Population ==
Historical population
Year	Pop.	±% p.a.
1968	30	—
1975	20	−5.63%
1982	19	−0.73%
1990	26	+4.00%
1999	18	−4.00%
2007	28	+5.68%
2012	33	+3.34%
2017	30	−1.89%
2023	33	+1.60%
Source: INSEE

== See also ==
- Corbières AOC
- Communes of the Aude department
