= Rouffiac-des-Corbières =

Commune in Occitanie, France

- Commune
- Coat of arms
- Location of Rouffiac-des-Corbières
- Location within France Location within Occitanie
- Coordinates: 42°52′52″N 2°33′16″E
- Country: France
- Region: Occitania
- Department: Aude
- Arrondissement: Narbonne
- Canton: Les Corbières

Government
  - Mayor (2020–2026): Franck Guichou
- Area^{1}: 16.04 km^{2} (6.19 sq mi)
- Elevation: 340 m (1,120 ft)
- Highest elevation: 849 m (2,785 ft)
- Lowest elevation: 319 m (1,047 ft)
- Population (2023): 75
  - Density: 4.7/km^{2} (12/sq mi)
- Time zone: UTC+01:00 (CET)
  - Summer (DST): UTC+02:00 (CEST)
- INSEE/Postal code: 11326 /11350
- ^{1} French Land Register data, which excludes lakes, ponds, glaciers > 1 km^{2} (0.386 sq mi or 247 acres) and river estuaries.

Rouffiac-des-Corbières (Languedocien: Rofiac de las Corbièras) is a commune in the Aude department in southern France.

== Population ==
Historical population
Year	Pop.	±% p.a.
1968	131	—
1975	115	−1.84%
1982	101	−1.84%
1990	88	−1.71%
1999	83	−0.65%
2007	88	+0.73%
2012	80	−1.89%
2017	86	+1.46%
2023	75	−2.26%
Source: INSEE

== See also ==
- Corbières AOC
- Communes of the Aude department
