= Saint-André-de-Roquelongue =

Commune in Occitanie, France

- Commune
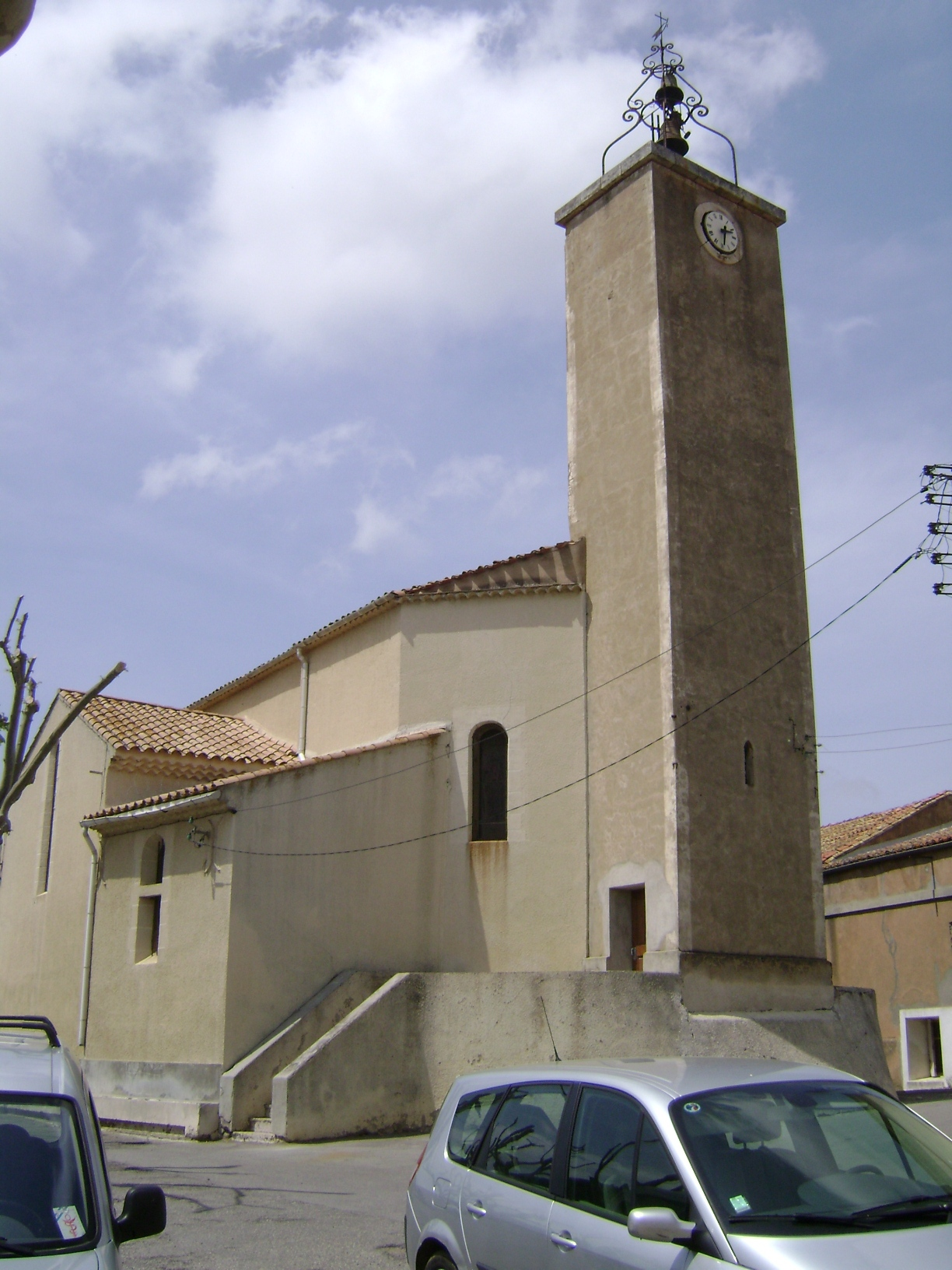
- The church in Saint-André-de-Roquelongue

- Coat of arms
- Location of Saint-André-de-Roquelongue
- Location within France Location within Occitanie
- Coordinates: 43°07′00″N 2°50′00″E
- Country: France
- Region: Occitania
- Department: Aude
- Arrondissement: Narbonne
- Canton: Les Corbières

Government
  - Mayor (2020–2026): Jean-Michel Folch
- Area^{1}: 30.81 km^{2} (11.90 sq mi)
- Highest elevation: 291 m (955 ft)
- Lowest elevation: 48 m (157 ft)
- Population (2023): 1,488
  - Density: 48.30/km^{2} (125.1/sq mi)
- Time zone: UTC+01:00 (CET)
  - Summer (DST): UTC+02:00 (CEST)
- INSEE/Postal code: 11332 /11200
- ^{1} French Land Register data, which excludes lakes, ponds, glaciers > 1 km^{2} (0.386 sq mi or 247 acres) and river estuaries.

Saint-André-de-Roquelongue (French pronunciation: [sɛ̃.t‿ɑ̃dʁe də ʁɔklɔ̃ɡ]; Occitan: Sant Andrieu de Ròcalonga) is a commune in the Aude department in southern France.

== Population ==
Historical population
Year	Pop.	±% p.a.
1968	813	—
1975	756	−1.03%
1982	680	−1.50%
1990	755	+1.32%
1999	828	+1.03%
2007	1,033	+2.80%
2012	1,242	+3.75%
2017	1,390	+2.28%
2023	1,488	+1.14%
Source: INSEE

== See also ==
- Corbières AOC
- Communes of the Aude department
