= Villesèque-des-Corbières =

Commune in Occitanie, France

- Commune
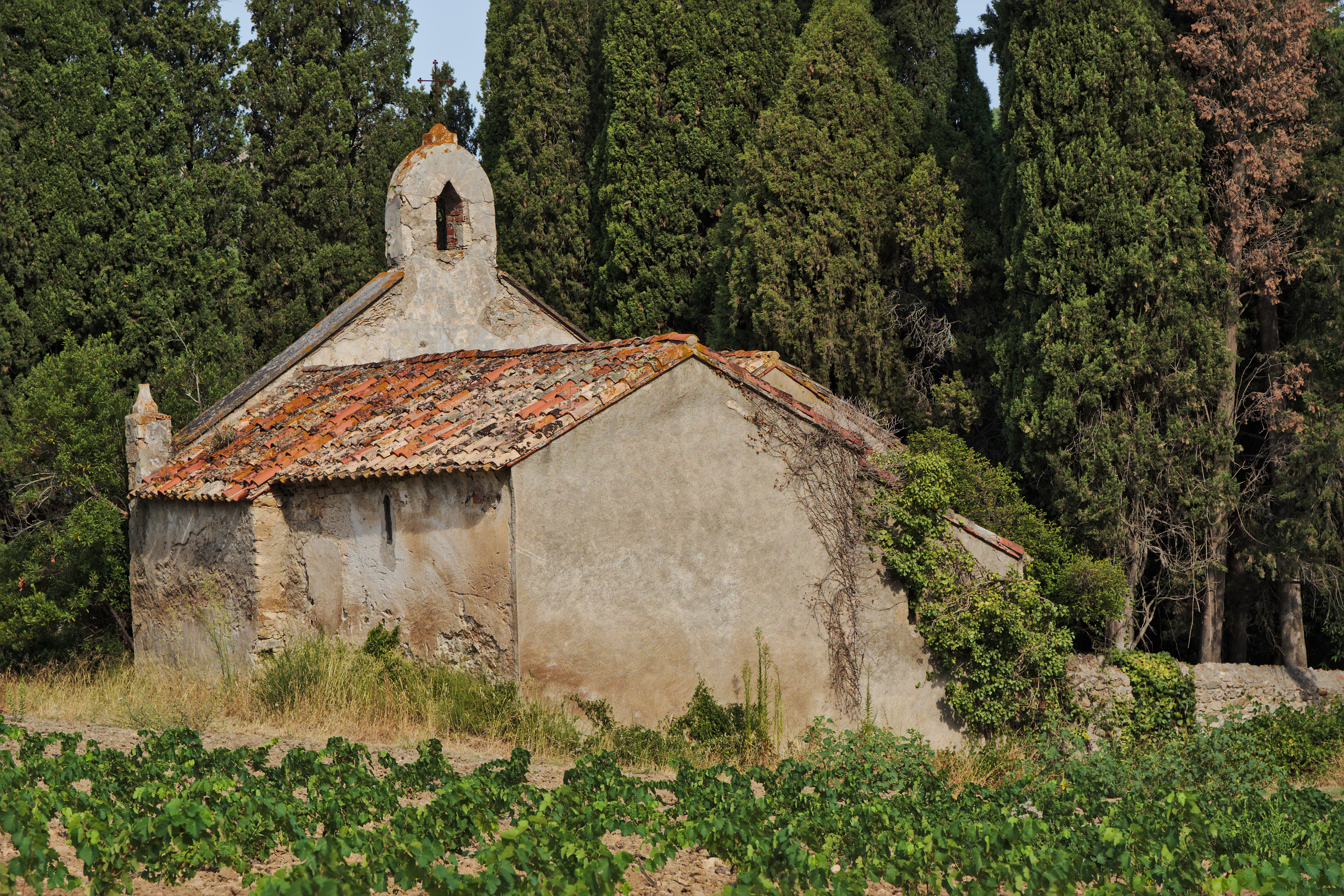
- The Gléon chapel in Villesèque-des-Corbières

- Coat of arms
- Location of Villesèque-des-Corbières
- Location within France Location within Occitanie
- Coordinates: 43°00′58″N 2°51′09″E
- Country: France
- Region: Occitania
- Department: Aude
- Arrondissement: Narbonne
- Canton: Les Corbières

Government
  - Mayor (2020–2026): Catherine Maitre
- Area^{1}: 31.69 km^{2} (12.24 sq mi)
- Elevation: 78 m (256 ft)
- Highest elevation: 380 m (1,250 ft)
- Lowest elevation: 36 m (118 ft)
- Population (2023): 386
  - Density: 12.2/km^{2} (31.5/sq mi)
- Time zone: UTC+01:00 (CET)
  - Summer (DST): UTC+02:00 (CEST)
- INSEE/Postal code: 11436 /11360
- ^{1} French Land Register data, which excludes lakes, ponds, glaciers > 1 km^{2} (0.386 sq mi or 247 acres) and river estuaries.

Villesèque-des-Corbières is a commune in the Aude department in southern France.

== Population ==
Historical population
| Year | Pop. | ±% p.a. |
|---|---|---|
| 1968 | 455 | — |
| 1975 | 348 | −3.76% |
| 1982 | 310 | −1.64% |
| 1990 | 306 | −0.16% |
| 1999 | 312 | +0.22% |
| 2007 | 380 | +2.50% |
| 2012 | 382 | +0.11% |
| 2017 | 374 | −0.42% |
| 2023 | 386 | +0.53% |
Source: INSEE

== See also ==
- Corbières AOC
- Communes of the Aude department
