= Arrondissement of Narbonne =

Coordinates: 43.18°N 3.00°E

Narbonne
- Arrondissement
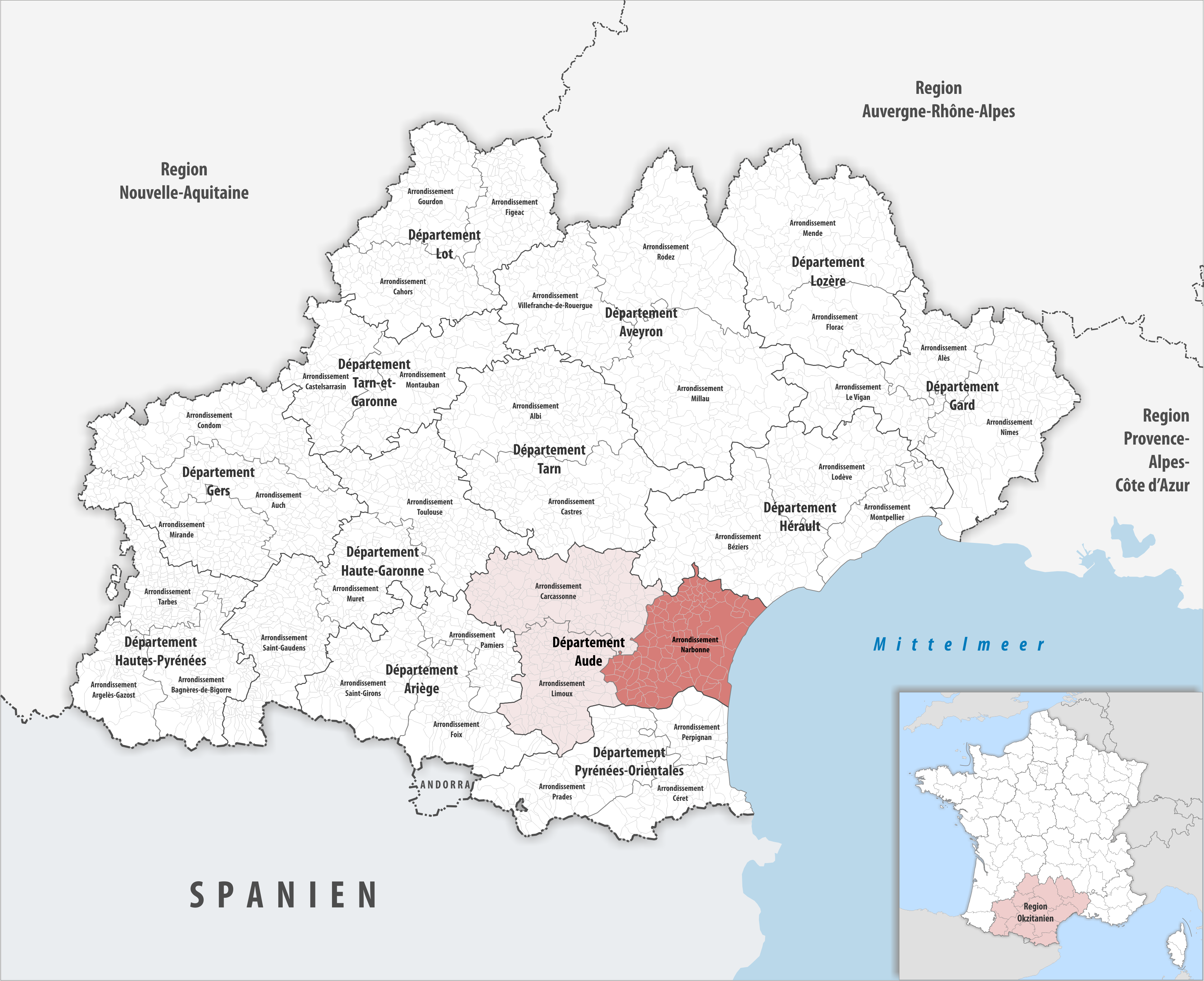
- Location within the region Occitanie
- Country: France
- Region: Occitania
- Department: Aude
- No. of communes: {{{nbcomm}}}
- Area: 2,101.9 km^{2} (811.5 sq mi)
- Population (2023): 173,196
  - Density: 82.400/km^{2} (213.41/sq mi)
- INSEE code: 113

The arrondissement of Narbonne is an arrondissement of France in the Aude department in the Occitanie région. Its INSEE code is 113 and its capital city is Narbonne. It has 109 communes. Its population is 170,698 (2021), and its area is 2,101.9 km^{2} (811.5 sq mi).

It is the easternmost of the arrondissements of the department. The main cities, with more than 5,000 inhabitants in 2012, in the arrondissement are Narbonne (51,869 inhabitants), Lézignan-Corbières (10,883 inhabitants), Coursan (6,056 inhabitants), Port-la-Nouvelle (5,653 inhabitants) and Sigean (5,476 inhabitants).

== Geography ==
The arrondissement of Narbonne is bordered to the north by the Hérault department, to the east by the Mediterranean Sea, to the south by the Pyrénées-Orientales department, to the southwest by the arrondissement of Limoux and to the northwest by the arrondissement of Carcassonne.

== Composition ==
The communes of the arrondissement of Narbonne, and their INSEE codes, are:

1. Albas (11006)
2. Albières (11007)
3. Argeliers (11012)
4. Argens-Minervois (11013)
5. Armissan (11014)
6. Auriac (11020)
7. Bages (11024)
8. Bizanet (11040)
9. Bize-Minervois (11041)
10. Bouisse (11044)
11. Boutenac (11048)
12. Camplong-d'Aude (11064)
13. Canet (11067)
14. Cascastel-des-Corbières (11071)
15. Castelnau-d'Aude (11077)
16. Caves (11086)
17. Conilhac-Corbières (11098)
18. Coursan (11106)
19. Coustouge (11110)
20. Cruscades (11111)
21. Cucugnan (11113)
22. Cuxac-d'Aude (11116)
23. Davejean (11117)
24. Dernacueillette (11118)
25. Duilhac-sous-Peyrepertuse (11123)
26. Durban-Corbières (11124)
27. Embres-et-Castelmaure (11125)
28. Escales (11126)
29. Fabrezan (11132)
30. Félines-Termenès (11137)
31. Ferrals-les-Corbières (11140)
32. Feuilla (11143)
33. Fitou (11144)
34. Fleury (11145)
35. Fontcouverte (11148)
36. Fontjoncouse (11152)
37. Fraissé-des-Corbières (11157)
38. Ginestas (11164)
39. Gruissan (11170)
40. Homps (11172)
41. Jonquières (11176)
42. Lagrasse (11185)
43. Lairière (11186)
44. Lanet (11187)
45. Laroque-de-Fa (11191)
46. Leucate (11202)
47. Lézignan-Corbières (11203)
48. Luc-sur-Orbieu (11210)
49. Mailhac (11212)
50. Maisons (11213)
51. Marcorignan (11217)
52. Massac (11224)
53. Mirepeisset (11233)
54. Montbrun-des-Corbières (11241)
55. Montgaillard (11245)
56. Montjoi (11250)
57. Montredon-des-Corbières (11255)
58. Montséret (11256)
59. Moussan (11258)
60. Mouthoumet (11260)
61. Moux (11261)
62. Narbonne (11262)
63. Névian (11264)
64. Ornaisons (11267)
65. Ouveillan (11269)
66. Padern (11270)
67. Palairac (11271)
68. La Palme (11188)
69. Paraza (11273)
70. Paziols (11276)
71. Peyriac-de-Mer (11285)
72. Portel-des-Corbières (11295)
73. Port-la-Nouvelle (11266)
74. Pouzols-Minervois (11296)
75. Quintillan (11305)
76. Raissac-d'Aude (11307)
77. Ribaute (11311)
78. Roquecourbe-Minervois (11318)
79. Roquefort-des-Corbières (11322)
80. Roubia (11324)
81. Rouffiac-des-Corbières (11326)
82. Saint-André-de-Roquelongue (11332)
83. Saint-Couat-d'Aude (11337)
84. Sainte-Valière (11366)
85. Saint-Jean-de-Barrou (11345)
86. Saint-Laurent-de-la-Cabrerisse (11351)
87. Saint-Marcel-sur-Aude (11353)
88. Saint-Martin-des-Puits (11354)
89. Saint-Nazaire-d'Aude (11360)
90. Saint-Pierre-des-Champs (11363)
91. Sallèles-d'Aude (11369)
92. Salles-d'Aude (11370)
93. Salza (11374)
94. Sigean (11379)
95. Soulatgé (11384)
96. Talairan (11386)
97. Termes (11388)
98. Thézan-des-Corbières (11390)
99. Tournissan (11392)
100. Tourouzelle (11393)
101. Treilles (11398)
102. Tuchan (11401)
103. Ventenac-en-Minervois (11405)
104. Vignevieille (11409)
105. Villedaigne (11421)
106. Villeneuve-les-Corbières (11431)
107. Villerouge-Termenès (11435)
108. Villesèque-des-Corbières (11436)
109. Vinassan (11441)

== History ==
The arrondissement of Narbonne was created in 1800. At the January 2017 reorganization of the arrondissements of Aude, it gained 27 communes from the arrondissement of Carcassonne.

As a result of the reorganisation of the cantons of France which came into effect in 2015, the borders of the cantons are no longer related to the borders of the arrondissements. The cantons of the arrondissement of Narbonne were, as of January 2015:

1. Coursan
2. Durban-Corbières
3. Ginestas
4. Lézignan-Corbières
5. Narbonne-Est
6. Narbonne-Ouest
7. Narbonne-Sud
8. Sigean
9. Tuchan
