= Bouisse =

Commune in Occitanie, France

- Commune
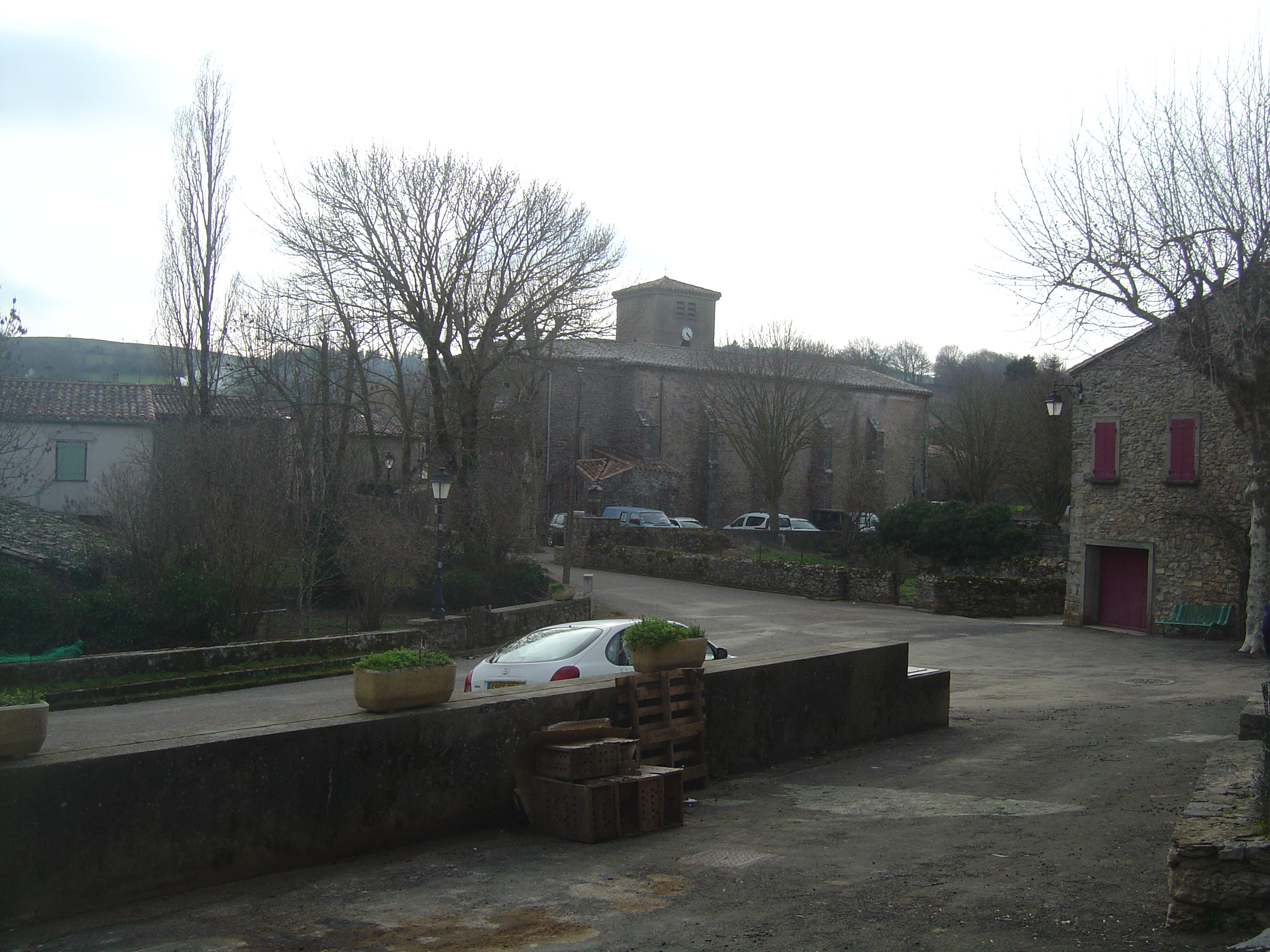
- The church and surroundings in Bouisse

- Coat of arms
- Location of Bouisse
- Location within France Location within Occitanie
- Coordinates: 42°59′15″N 2°27′14″E
- Country: France
- Region: Occitania
- Department: Aude
- Arrondissement: Narbonne
- Canton: Les Corbières

Government
  - Mayor (2020–2026): Philippe Lacombe
- Area^{1}: 25.44 km^{2} (9.82 sq mi)
- Elevation: 600 m (2,000 ft)
- Highest elevation: 926 m (3,038 ft)
- Lowest elevation: 472 m (1,549 ft)
- Population (2023): 104
  - Density: 4.09/km^{2} (10.6/sq mi)
- Time zone: UTC+01:00 (CET)
  - Summer (DST): UTC+02:00 (CEST)
- INSEE/Postal code: 11044 /11330
- ^{1} French Land Register data, which excludes lakes, ponds, glaciers > 1 km^{2} (0.386 sq mi or 247 acres) and river estuaries.

Bouisse (French pronunciation: [bwis]; Occitan: Boissa) is a commune in the Aude department in southern France.

== Population ==
Historical population
| Year | Pop. | ±% p.a. |
|---|---|---|
| 1968 | 96 | — |
| 1975 | 72 | −4.03% |
| 1982 | 87 | +2.74% |
| 1990 | 72 | −2.34% |
| 1999 | 85 | +1.86% |
| 2007 | 93 | +1.13% |
| 2012 | 92 | −0.22% |
| 2017 | 100 | +1.68% |
| 2023 | 104 | +0.66% |
Source: INSEE

== See also ==
- Communes of the Aude department
