= Tournissan =

Commune in Occitanie, France

- Commune
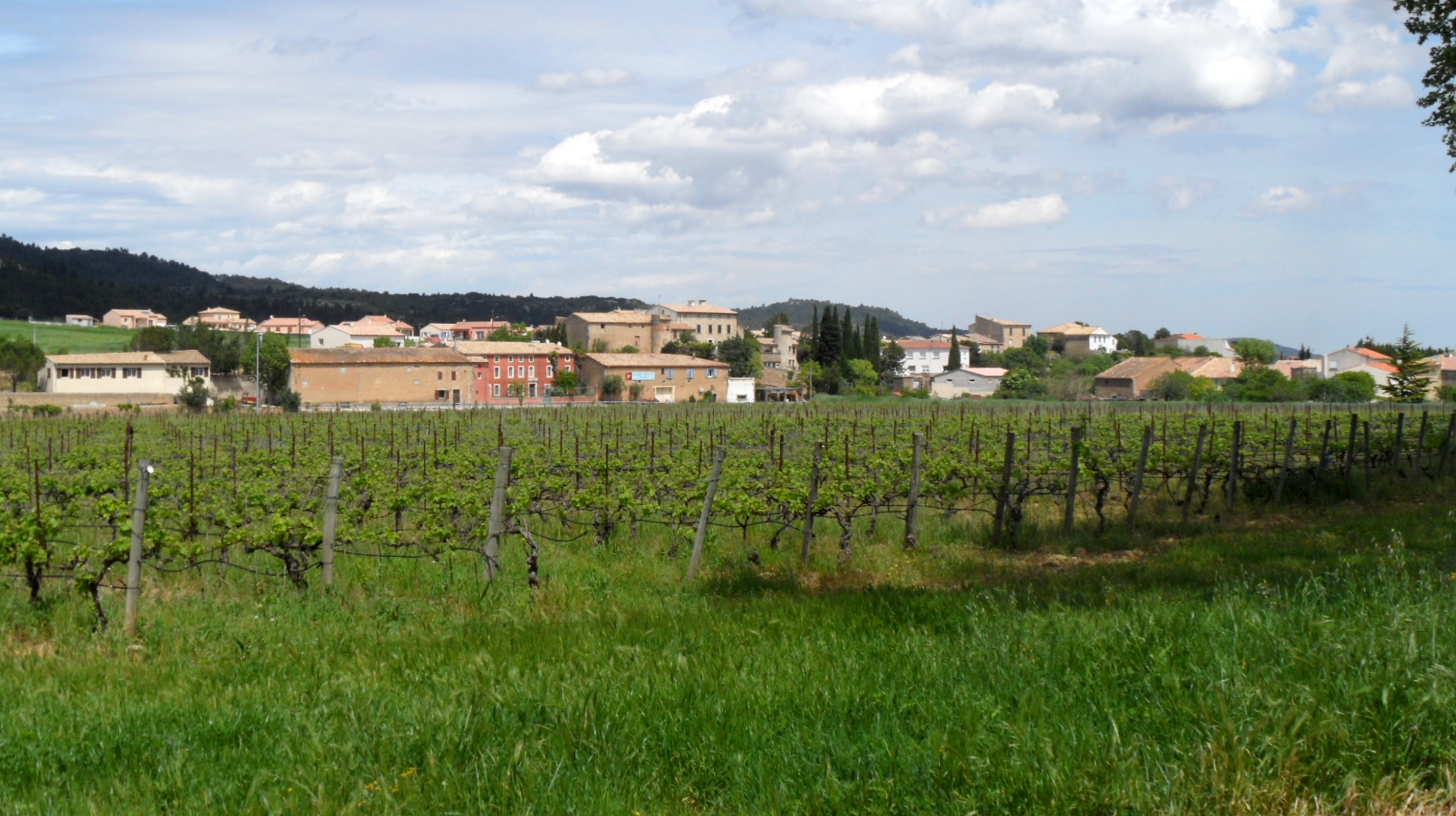
- A general view of Tournissan

- Coat of arms
- Location of Tournissan
- Location within France Location within Occitanie
- Coordinates: 43°04′56″N 2°39′54″E
- Country: France
- Region: Occitania
- Department: Aude
- Arrondissement: Narbonne
- Canton: Les Corbières
- Intercommunality: Région Lézignanaise, Corbières et Minervois

Government
  - Mayor (2020–2026): Marilyse Riviere
- Area^{1}: 11.53 km^{2} (4.45 sq mi)
- Elevation: 133 m (436 ft)
- Highest elevation: 310 m (1,020 ft)
- Lowest elevation: 119 m (390 ft)
- Population (2023): 292
  - Density: 25.3/km^{2} (65.6/sq mi)
- Time zone: UTC+01:00 (CET)
  - Summer (DST): UTC+02:00 (CEST)
- INSEE/Postal code: 11392 /11220
- ^{1} French Land Register data, which excludes lakes, ponds, glaciers > 1 km^{2} (0.386 sq mi or 247 acres) and river estuaries.

Tournissan (French pronunciation: [tuʁnisɑ̃]; Occitan: Tornissan) is a commune in the Aude department in southern France.

== Population ==
Historical population
Year	Pop.	±% p.a.
1968	319	—
1975	259	−2.93%
1982	219	−2.37%
1990	209	−0.58%
1999	215	+0.31%
2007	257	+2.26%
2012	277	+1.51%
2017	272	−0.36%
2023	292	+1.19%
Source: INSEE

== See also ==
- Corbières AOC
- Communes of the Aude department
