= Camplong-d'Aude =

Commune in Occitanie, France

- Commune
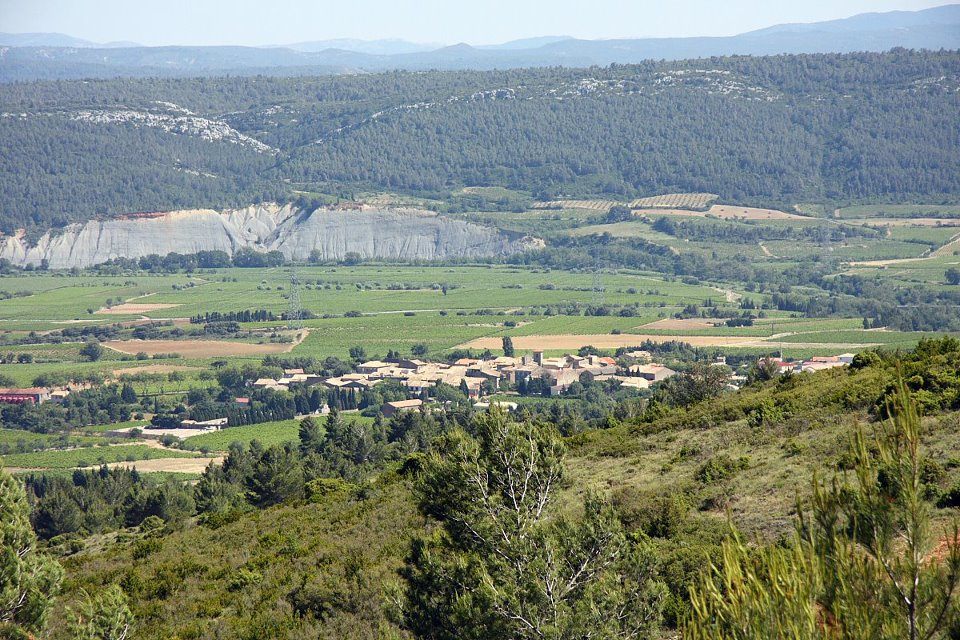
- A general view of Camplong-d'Aude

- Coat of arms
- Location of Camplong-d'Aude
- Location within France Location within Occitanie
- Coordinates: 43°07′45″N 2°39′10″E
- Country: France
- Region: Occitania
- Department: Aude
- Arrondissement: Narbonne
- Canton: Les Corbières
- Intercommunality: Région Lézignanaise, Corbières et Minervois

Government
  - Mayor (2020–2026): Serge Lépine
- Area^{1}: 12.28 km^{2} (4.74 sq mi)
- Elevation: 120 m (390 ft)
- Highest elevation: 589 m (1,932 ft)
- Lowest elevation: 67 m (220 ft)
- Population (2023): 389
  - Density: 31.7/km^{2} (82.0/sq mi)
- Time zone: UTC+01:00 (CET)
  - Summer (DST): UTC+02:00 (CEST)
- INSEE/Postal code: 11064 /11200
- ^{1} French Land Register data, which excludes lakes, ponds, glaciers > 1 km^{2} (0.386 sq mi or 247 acres) and river estuaries.

Camplong-d'Aude (French pronunciation: [kɑ̃plɔ̃ dod]; Occitan: Camplong d'Aude) is a commune in the Aude department in southern France.

== Population ==
Historical population
Year	Pop.	±% p.a.
1968	288	—
1975	288	+0.00%
1982	236	−2.80%
1990	250	+0.72%
1999	270	+0.86%
2007	270	+0.00%
2012	336	+4.47%
2017	367	+1.78%
2023	389	+0.98%
Source: INSEE

== Geography ==
The river Orbieu forms most of the commune's southern border.

== See also ==
- Corbières AOC
- Communes of the Aude department
