= Saint-Jean-de-Barrou =

Commune in Occitanie, France

- Commune
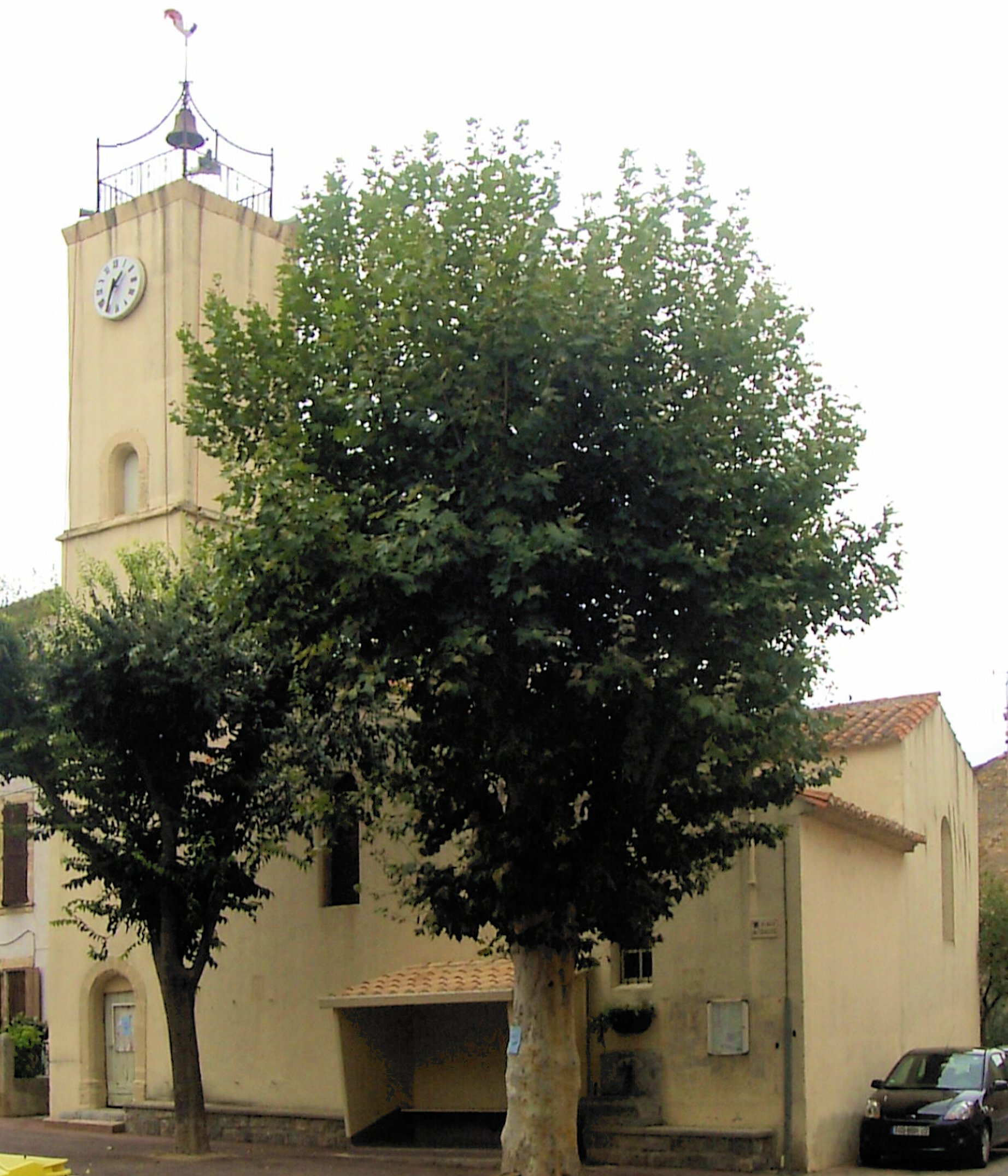
- The church in Saint-Jean-de-Barrou

- Coat of arms
- Location of Saint-Jean-de-Barrou
- Location within France Location within Occitanie
- Coordinates: 42°57′30″N 2°50′26″E
- Country: France
- Region: Occitania
- Department: Aude
- Arrondissement: Narbonne
- Canton: Les Corbières

Government
  - Mayor (2020–2026): Michel Diaz
- Area^{1}: 7.61 km^{2} (2.94 sq mi)
- Elevation: 125 m (410 ft)
- Highest elevation: 347 m (1,138 ft)
- Lowest elevation: 109 m (358 ft)
- Population (2023): 272
  - Density: 35.7/km^{2} (92.6/sq mi)
- Time zone: UTC+01:00 (CET)
  - Summer (DST): UTC+02:00 (CEST)
- INSEE/Postal code: 11345 /11360
- ^{1} French Land Register data, which excludes lakes, ponds, glaciers > 1 km^{2} (0.386 sq mi or 247 acres) and river estuaries.

Saint-Jean-de-Barrou (French pronunciation: [sɛ̃ ʒɑ̃ də baʁu]; Languedocien: Sant Joan de Barro or Sant Joan de Bàrron) is a commune in the Aude department in southern France.

== Population ==
Historical population
Year	Pop.	±% p.a.
1968	314	—
1975	301	−0.60%
1982	292	−0.43%
1990	225	−3.21%
1999	204	−1.08%
2007	248	+2.47%
2012	276	+2.16%
2017	254	−1.65%
2023	272	+1.15%
Source: INSEE

== See also ==
- Corbières AOC
- Communes of the Aude department
