= Laroque-de-Fa =

Commune in Occitanie, France

- Commune
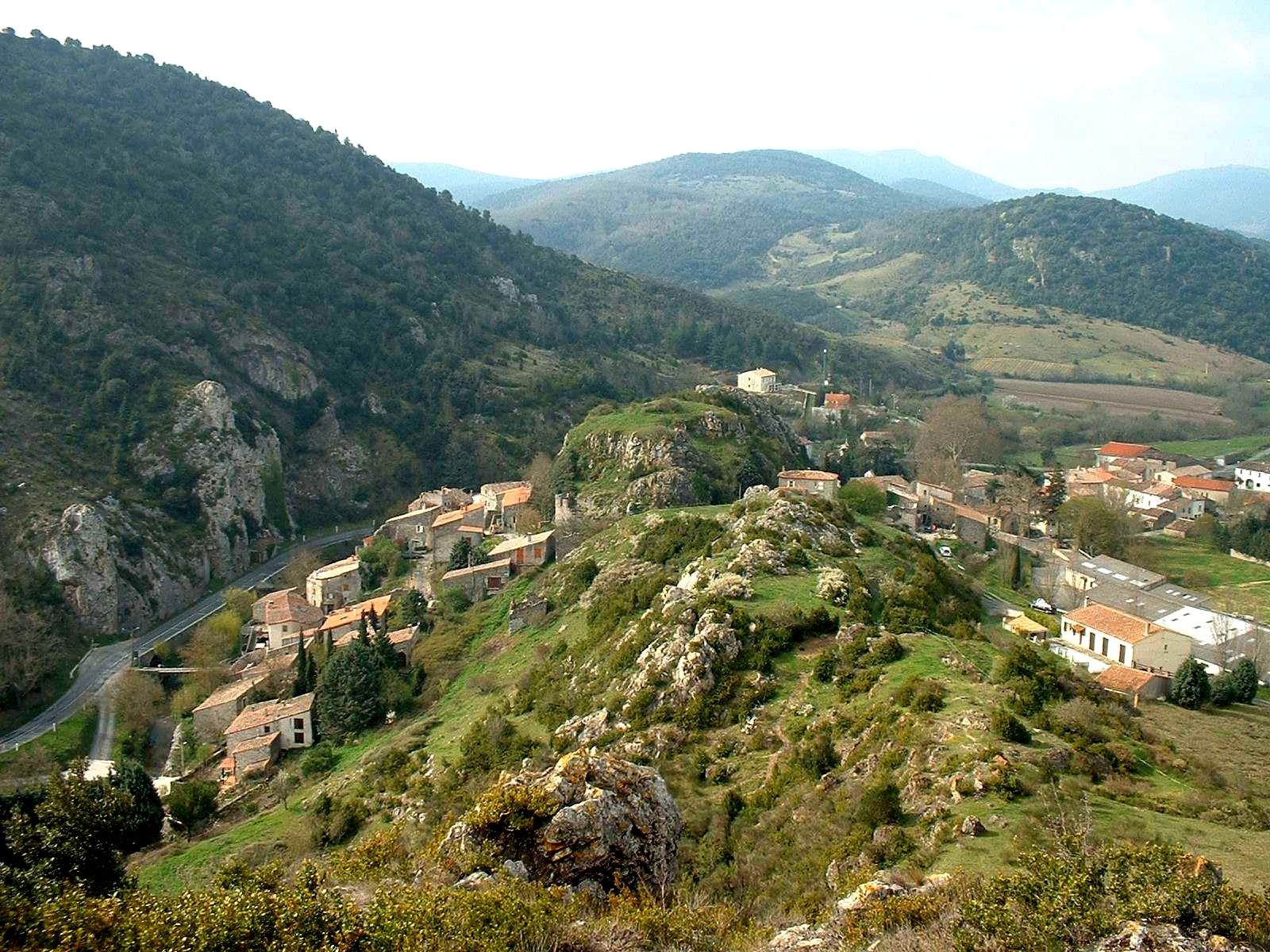
- A general view of Laroque-de-Fa

- Coat of arms
- Location of Laroque-de-Fa
- Location within France Location within Occitanie
- Coordinates: 42°57′27″N 2°33′55″E
- Country: France
- Region: Occitania
- Department: Aude
- Arrondissement: Narbonne
- Canton: Les Corbières

Government
  - Mayor (2020–2026): Raymond Spoli
- Area^{1}: 20.41 km^{2} (7.88 sq mi)
- Elevation: 446 m (1,463 ft)
- Highest elevation: 849 m (2,785 ft)
- Lowest elevation: 360 m (1,180 ft)
- Population (2023): 138
  - Density: 6.76/km^{2} (17.5/sq mi)
- Time zone: UTC+01:00 (CET)
  - Summer (DST): UTC+02:00 (CEST)
- INSEE/Postal code: 11191 /11330
- ^{1} French Land Register data, which excludes lakes, ponds, glaciers > 1 km^{2} (0.386 sq mi or 247 acres) and river estuaries.

Laroque-de-Fa (French pronunciation: [laʁɔk də fa]; Occitan: La Ròca de Fan) is a commune in the Aude department in southern France.

== Population ==
Historical population
Year	Pop.	±% p.a.
1968	99	—
1975	83	−2.49%
1982	152	+9.03%
1990	154	+0.16%
1999	144	−0.74%
2007	152	+0.68%
2012	146	−0.80%
2017	151	+0.68%
2023	138	−1.49%
Source: INSEE

== See also ==
- Corbières AOC
- Communes of the Aude department
