= Dernacueillette =

Commune in Occitanie, France

- Commune
- Coat of arms
- Location of Dernacueillette
- Location within France Location within Occitanie
- Coordinates: 42°55′45″N 2°35′55″E
- Country: France
- Region: Occitania
- Department: Aude
- Arrondissement: Narbonne
- Canton: Les Corbières

Government
  - Mayor (2020–2026): Aaron-Lee Gustave Grimstone
- Area^{1}: 7.75 km^{2} (2.99 sq mi)
- Elevation: 320 m (1,050 ft)
- Highest elevation: 642 m (2,106 ft)
- Lowest elevation: 316 m (1,037 ft)
- Population (2023): 43
  - Density: 5.5/km^{2} (14/sq mi)
- Time zone: UTC+01:00 (CET)
  - Summer (DST): UTC+02:00 (CEST)
- INSEE/Postal code: 11118 /11330
- ^{1} French Land Register data, which excludes lakes, ponds, glaciers > 1 km^{2} (0.386 sq mi or 247 acres) and river estuaries.

Dernacueillette (French pronunciation: [dɛʁnakœjɛt]; Occitan: Dernaculheta) is a commune in the Aude department in southern France.

== Population ==
Historical population
Year	Pop.	±% p.a.
1968	63	—
1975	57	−1.42%
1982	48	−2.43%
1990	56	+1.95%
1999	45	−2.40%
2007	40	−1.46%
2012	44	+1.92%
2017	41	−1.40%
2023	43	+0.80%
Source: INSEE

== See also ==
- Corbières AOC
- Communes of the Aude department
