= Davejean =

Commune in Occitanie, France

- Commune
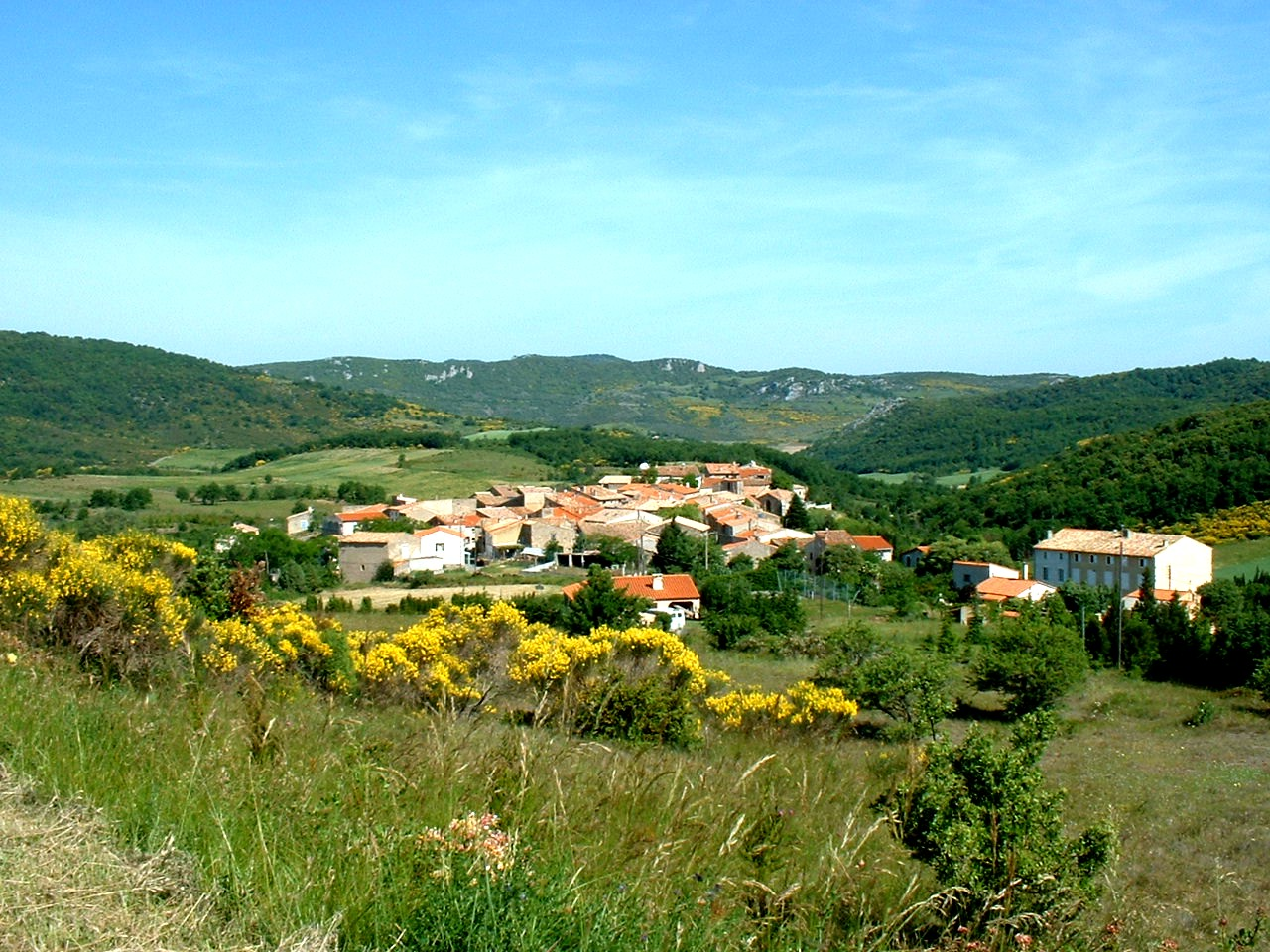
- A general view of Davejean

- Coat of arms
- Location of Davejean
- Location within France Location within Occitanie
- Coordinates: 42°57′38″N 2°36′25″E
- Country: France
- Region: Occitania
- Department: Aude
- Arrondissement: Narbonne
- Canton: Les Corbières
- Intercommunality: Région Lézignanaise, Corbières et Minervois

Government
  - Mayor (2020–2026): Melinda Bornia
- Area^{1}: 13.36 km^{2} (5.16 sq mi)
- Elevation: 400 m (1,300 ft)
- Highest elevation: 603 m (1,978 ft)
- Lowest elevation: 354 m (1,161 ft)
- Population (2023): 163
  - Density: 12.2/km^{2} (31.6/sq mi)
- Time zone: UTC+01:00 (CET)
  - Summer (DST): UTC+02:00 (CEST)
- INSEE/Postal code: 11117 /11330
- ^{1} French Land Register data, which excludes lakes, ponds, glaciers > 1 km^{2} (0.386 sq mi or 247 acres) and river estuaries.

Davejean (French pronunciation: [davʒɑ̃]; Occitan: Davejan) is a commune in the Aude department in southern France.

== History ==
Davejean was founded as a small keep at the head of the village, in the heart of the area inhabited by the Cathars.

== Population ==
Historical population
Year	Pop.	±% p.a.
1968	144	—
1975	131	−1.34%
1982	112	−2.21%
1990	130	+1.88%
1999	116	−1.26%
2007	106	−1.12%
2012	115	+1.64%
2017	117	+0.35%
2023	163	+5.68%
Source: INSEE

== See also ==
- Corbières AOC
- Communes of the Aude department
