= Quintillan =

Commune in Occitanie, France

- Commune
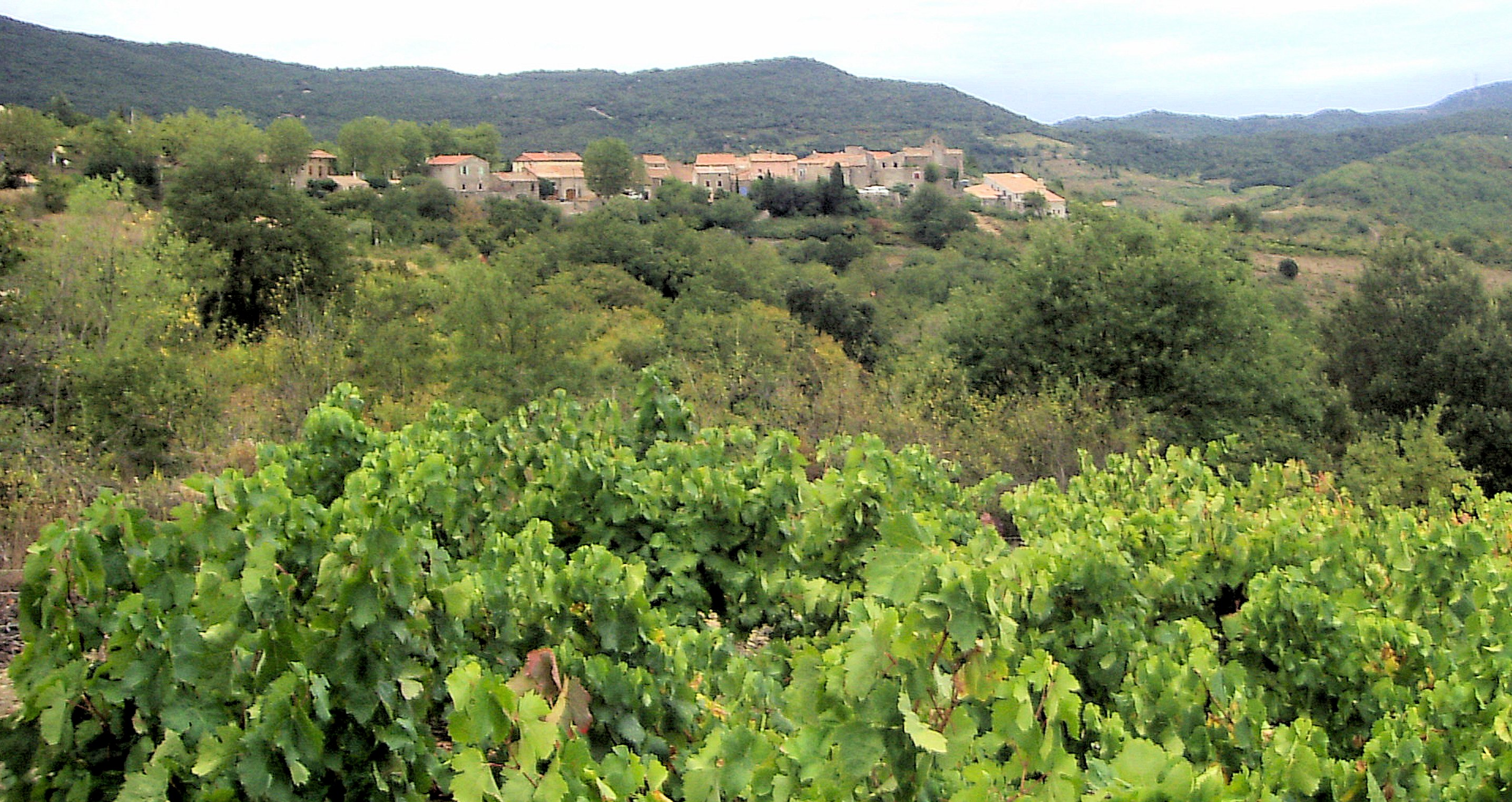
- A general view of Quintillan

- Coat of arms
- Location of Quintillan
- Location within France Location within Occitanie
- Coordinates: 42°57′59″N 2°42′42″E
- Country: France
- Region: Occitania
- Department: Aude
- Arrondissement: Narbonne
- Canton: Les Corbières

Government
  - Mayor (2020–2026): André Contreras
- Area^{1}: 16.42 km^{2} (6.34 sq mi)
- Elevation: 330 m (1,080 ft)
- Highest elevation: 612 m (2,008 ft)
- Lowest elevation: 215 m (705 ft)
- Population (2023): 62
  - Density: 3.8/km^{2} (9.8/sq mi)
- Time zone: UTC+01:00 (CET)
  - Summer (DST): UTC+02:00 (CEST)
- INSEE/Postal code: 11305 /11360
- ^{1} French Land Register data, which excludes lakes, ponds, glaciers > 1 km^{2} (0.386 sq mi or 247 acres) and river estuaries.

Quintillan (French pronunciation: [kɛ̃tijɑ̃]; Occitan: Quintilhan) is a commune in the Aude department in southern France.

== Population ==
Historical population
| Year | Pop. | ±% p.a. |
|---|---|---|
| 1968 | 94 | — |
| 1975 | 80 | −2.28% |
| 1982 | 91 | +1.86% |
| 1990 | 55 | −6.10% |
| 1999 | 55 | +0.00% |
| 2007 | 60 | +1.09% |
| 2012 | 67 | +2.23% |
| 2017 | 52 | −4.94% |
| 2023 | 62 | +2.97% |
Source: INSEE

== See also ==
- Corbières AOC
- Communes of the Aude department
