= Lairière =

Commune in Occitanie, France

- Commune
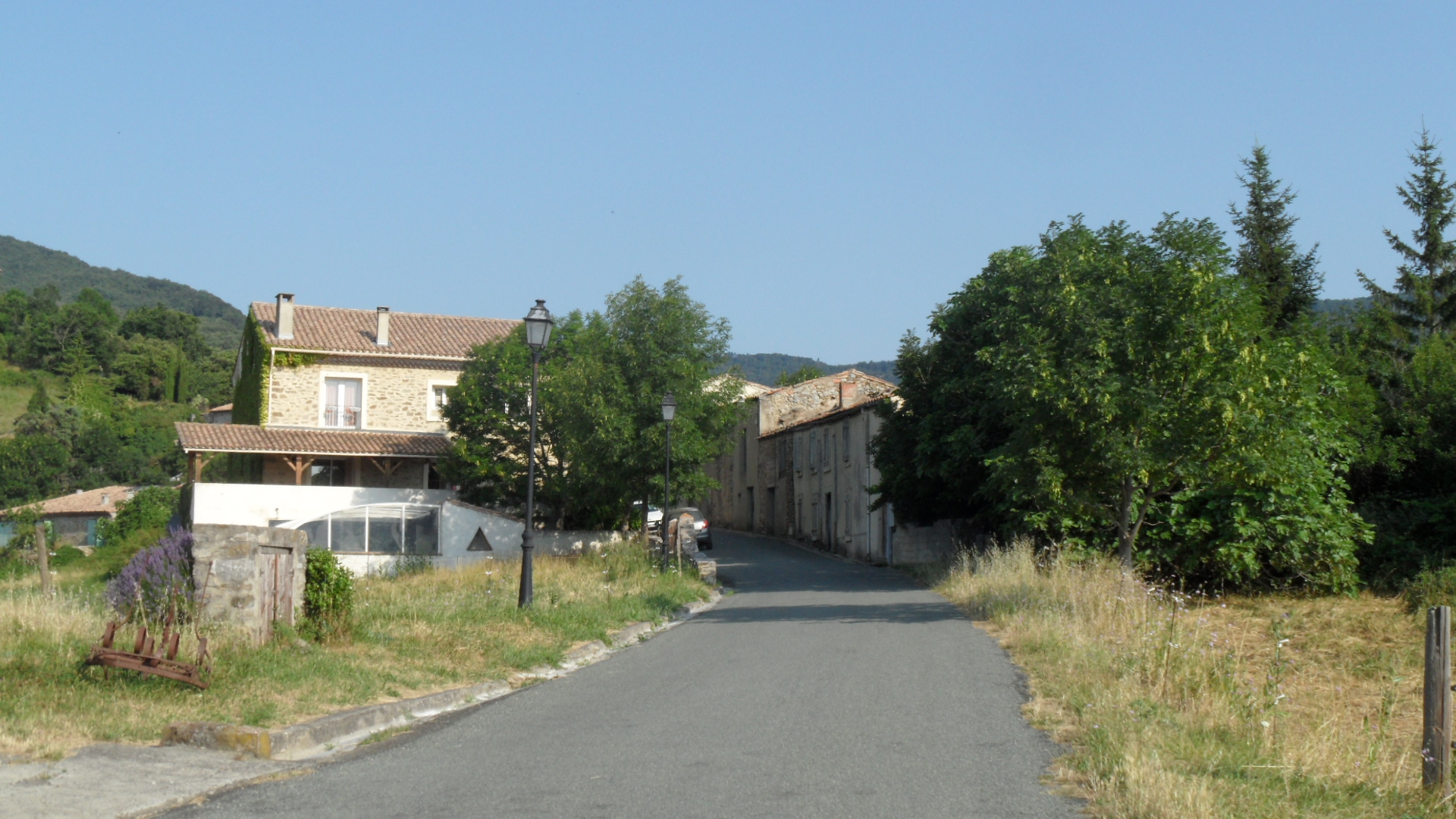
- A general view of Lairière
- Location of Lairière
- Location within France Location within Occitanie
- Coordinates: 43°01′00″N 2°29′08″E
- Country: France
- Region: Occitania
- Department: Aude
- Arrondissement: Narbonne
- Canton: Les Corbières

Government
  - Mayor (2020–2026): Michel Barbaza
- Area^{1}: 13.08 km^{2} (5.05 sq mi)
- Elevation: 330 m (1,080 ft)
- Highest elevation: 875 m (2,871 ft)
- Lowest elevation: 246 m (807 ft)
- Population (2023): 52
  - Density: 4.0/km^{2} (10/sq mi)
- Time zone: UTC+01:00 (CET)
  - Summer (DST): UTC+02:00 (CEST)
- INSEE/Postal code: 11186 /11330
- ^{1} French Land Register data, which excludes lakes, ponds, glaciers > 1 km^{2} (0.386 sq mi or 247 acres) and river estuaries.

Lairière (French pronunciation: [lɛʁjɛʁ]; Occitan: Lairièra) is a commune in the Aude department in southern France.

== Population ==
Historical population
Year	Pop.	±% p.a.
1968	25	—
1975	21	−2.46%
1982	24	+1.93%
1990	32	+3.66%
1999	37	+1.63%
2007	47	+3.04%
2012	43	−1.76%
2017	52	+3.87%
2023	52	+0.00%
Source: INSEE

== See also ==
- Communes of the Aude department
