= Félines-Termenès =

Commune in Occitanie, France

- Commune
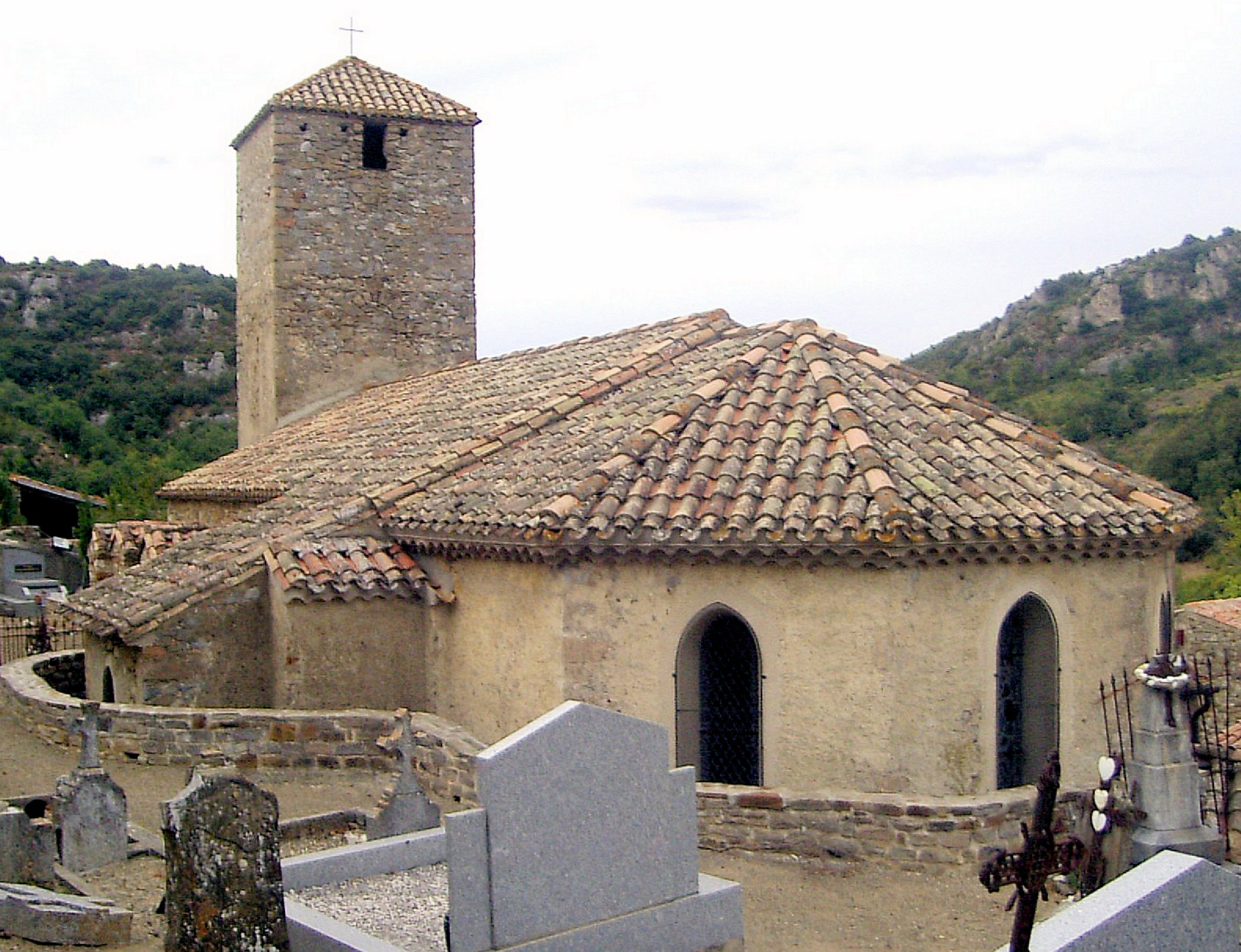
- The church in Félines-Termenès

- Coat of arms
- Location of Félines-Termenès
- Location within France Location within Occitanie
- Coordinates: 42°59′22″N 2°36′57″E
- Country: France
- Region: Occitania
- Department: Aude
- Arrondissement: Narbonne
- Canton: Les Corbières

Government
  - Mayor (2020–2026): Jean-Marie Saury
- Area^{1}: 10.01 km^{2} (3.86 sq mi)
- Elevation: 320 m (1,050 ft)
- Highest elevation: 621 m (2,037 ft)
- Lowest elevation: 305 m (1,001 ft)
- Population (2023): 130
  - Density: 13/km^{2} (34/sq mi)
- Time zone: UTC+01:00 (CET)
  - Summer (DST): UTC+02:00 (CEST)
- INSEE/Postal code: 11137 /11330
- ^{1} French Land Register data, which excludes lakes, ponds, glaciers > 1 km^{2} (0.386 sq mi or 247 acres) and river estuaries.

Félines-Termenès (French pronunciation: [felin tɛʁmənɛs]; Occitan: Felinas de Termenés, before 1962: Félines) is a commune in the Aude department in southern France.

== Population ==
Historical population
| Year | Pop. | ±% p.a. |
|---|---|---|
| 1968 | 105 | — |
| 1975 | 108 | +0.40% |
| 1982 | 106 | −0.27% |
| 1990 | 107 | +0.12% |
| 1999 | 110 | +0.31% |
| 2007 | 136 | +2.69% |
| 2012 | 127 | −1.36% |
| 2017 | 117 | −1.63% |
| 2023 | 130 | +1.77% |
Source: INSEE

== See also ==
- Corbières AOC
- Communes of the Aude department
