= Montséret =

Commune in Occitanie, France

- Commune
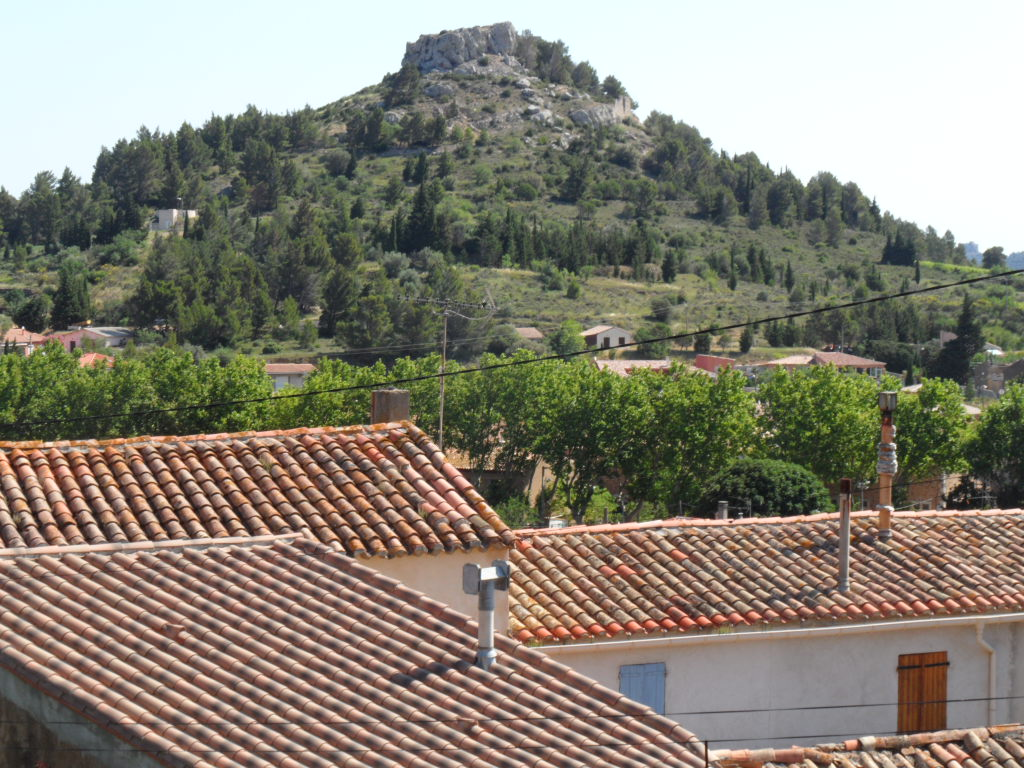
- Roquelongue seen from Montséret

- Coat of arms
- Location of Montséret
- Location within France Location within Occitanie
- Coordinates: 43°06′13″N 2°48′42″E
- Country: France
- Region: Occitania
- Department: Aude
- Arrondissement: Narbonne
- Canton: Les Corbières
- Intercommunality: Région Lézignanaise, Corbières et Minervois

Government
  - Mayor (2022–2026): Yves Fabre
- Area^{1}: 11.31 km^{2} (4.37 sq mi)
- Elevation: 97 m (318 ft)
- Highest elevation: 240 m (790 ft)
- Lowest elevation: 55 m (180 ft)
- Population (2023): 616
  - Density: 54.5/km^{2} (141/sq mi)
- Time zone: UTC+01:00 (CET)
  - Summer (DST): UTC+02:00 (CEST)
- INSEE/Postal code: 11256 /11200
- ^{1} French Land Register data, which excludes lakes, ponds, glaciers > 1 km^{2} (0.386 sq mi or 247 acres) and river estuaries.

Montséret is a commune in the Aude department in southern France. Montséret is a small wine-producing village in the wine district of Corbières. The village's annual festival is held in early- to mid-July and includes a community dinner.

== Population ==
Historical population
Year	Pop.	±% p.a.
1968	360	—
1975	308	−2.20%
1982	306	−0.09%
1990	347	+1.58%
1999	401	+1.62%
2007	474	+2.11%
2012	529	+2.22%
2017	594	+2.34%
2023	616	+0.61%
Source: INSEE

== See also ==
- Corbières AOC
- Communes of the Aude department
