= Fraissé-des-Corbières =

Commune in Occitanie, France

- Commune
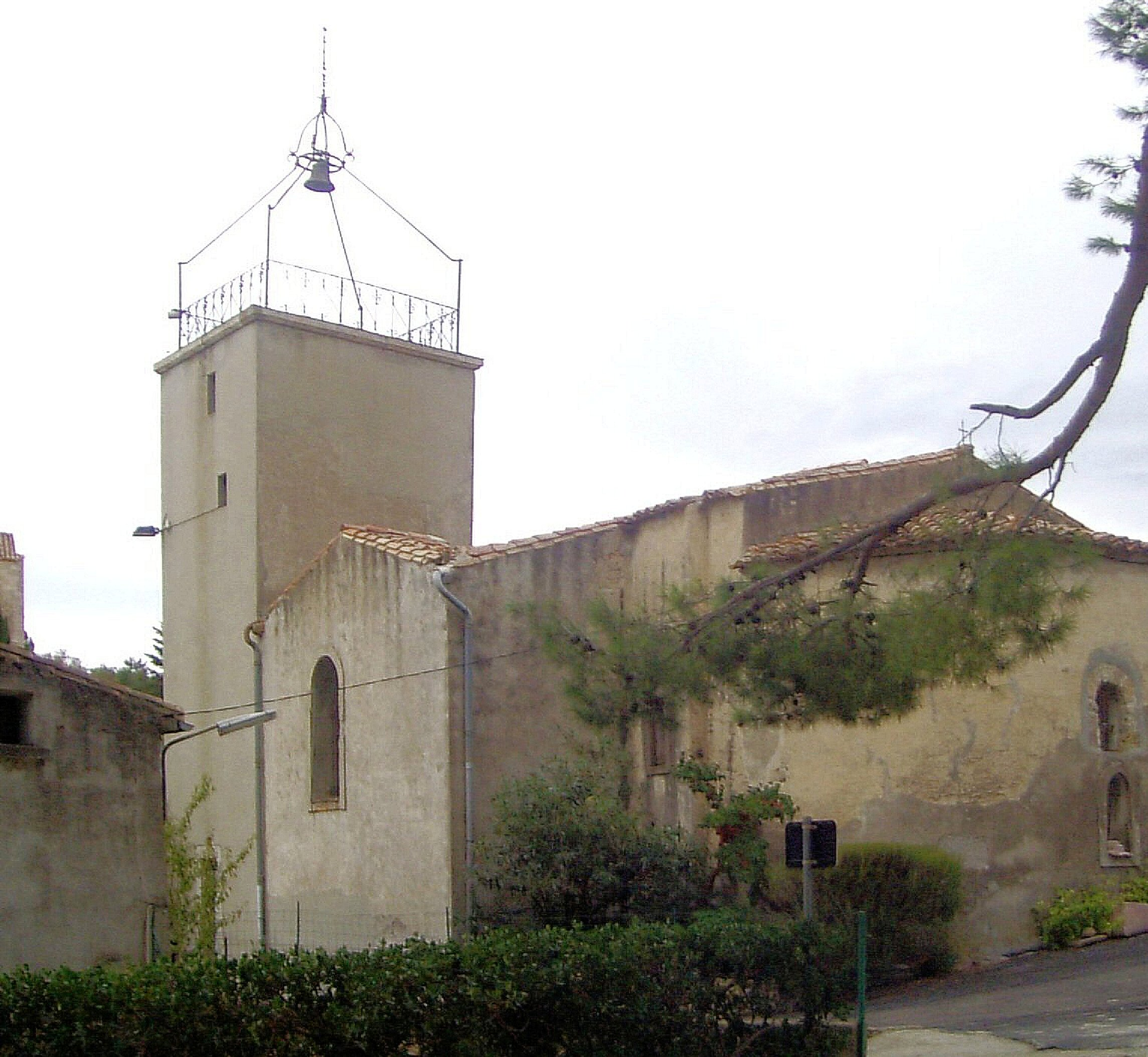
- The church in Fraissé-des-Corbières

- Coat of arms
- Location of Fraissé-des-Corbières
- Location within France Location within Occitanie
- Coordinates: 42°57′48″N 2°51′37″E
- Country: France
- Region: Occitania
- Department: Aude
- Arrondissement: Narbonne
- Canton: Les Corbières

Government
  - Mayor (2020–2026): Céline Cerda
- Area^{1}: 19.1 km^{2} (7.4 sq mi)
- Elevation: 140 m (460 ft)
- Highest elevation: 641 m (2,103 ft)
- Lowest elevation: 116 m (381 ft)
- Population (2023): 232
  - Density: 12.1/km^{2} (31.5/sq mi)
- Time zone: UTC+01:00 (CET)
  - Summer (DST): UTC+02:00 (CEST)
- INSEE/Postal code: 11157 /11360
- ^{1} French Land Register data, which excludes lakes, ponds, glaciers > 1 km^{2} (0.386 sq mi or 247 acres) and river estuaries.

Fraissé-des-Corbières (French pronunciation: [fʁajse de kɔʁbjɛʁ]; Occitan: Fraisse de las Corbièras) is a commune in the Aude department in southern France.

== Population ==
Historical population
Year	Pop.	±% p.a.
1968	229	—
1975	222	−0.44%
1982	224	+0.13%
1990	198	−1.53%
1999	169	−1.74%
2007	230	+3.93%
2012	240	+0.85%
2017	220	−1.73%
2023	232	+0.89%
Source: INSEE

== Sports ==
There is a boules ground in the village.

== See also ==
- Corbières AOC
- Communes of the Aude department
