= Saint-Laurent-de-la-Cabrerisse =

Commune in Occitanie, France

- Commune
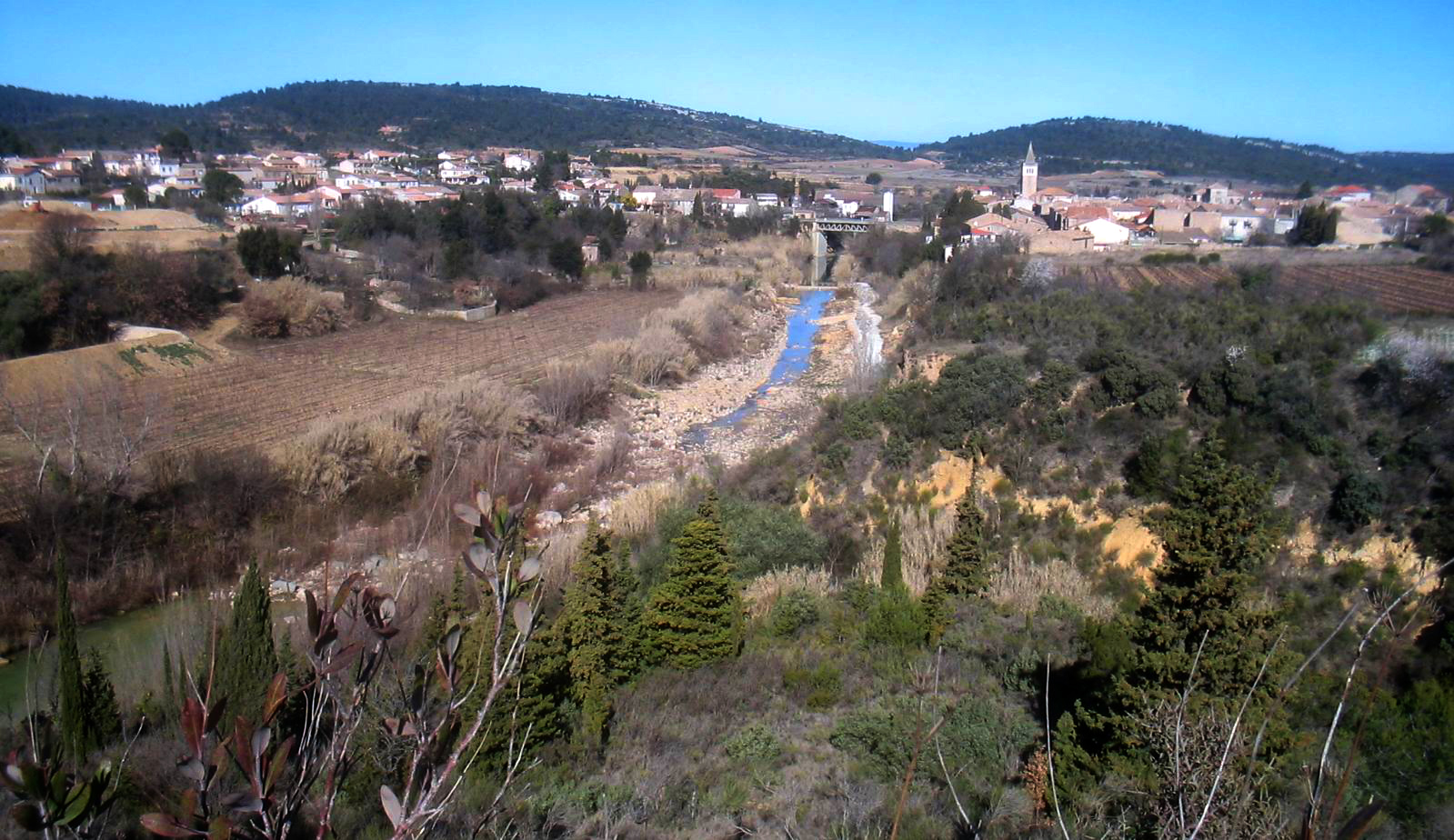
- A general view of Saint-Laurent-de-la-Cabrerisse

- Coat of arms
- Location of Saint-Laurent-de-la-Cabrerisse
- Location within France Location within Occitanie
- Coordinates: 43°05′11″N 2°42′05″E
- Country: France
- Region: Occitania
- Department: Aude
- Arrondissement: Narbonne
- Canton: Les Corbières

Government
  - Mayor (2020–2026): Xavier de Volontat
- Area^{1}: 25.03 km^{2} (9.66 sq mi)
- Elevation: 105 m (344 ft)
- Highest elevation: 344 m (1,129 ft)
- Lowest elevation: 76 m (249 ft)
- Population (2023): 753
  - Density: 30.1/km^{2} (77.9/sq mi)
- Time zone: UTC+01:00 (CET)
  - Summer (DST): UTC+02:00 (CEST)
- INSEE/Postal code: 11351 /11220
- ^{1} French Land Register data, which excludes lakes, ponds, glaciers > 1 km^{2} (0.386 sq mi or 247 acres) and river estuaries.

Saint-Laurent-de-la-Cabrerisse (French pronunciation: [sɛ̃ loʁɑ̃ də la kabʁəʁis]; Occitan: Sant Laurenç de la Cabrerissa) is a commune in the Aude department in southern France.

== Population ==
Historical population
Year	Pop.	±% p.a.
1968	887	—
1975	789	−1.66%
1982	659	−2.54%
1990	624	−0.68%
1999	642	+0.32%
2007	715	+1.36%
2012	772	+1.55%
2017	736	−0.95%
2023	753	+0.38%
Source: INSEE

== See also ==
- Corbières AOC
- Communes of the Aude department
