= Ribaute =

Commune in Occitanie, France

- Commune
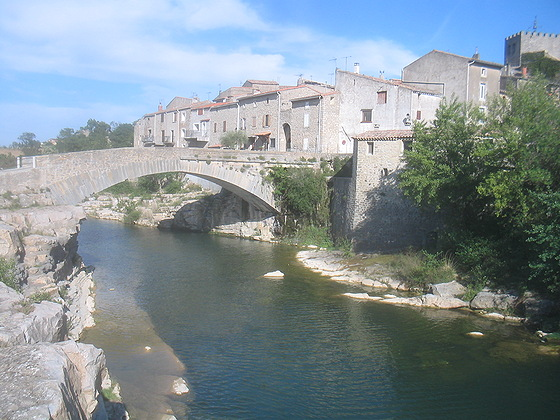
- The Orbieu

- Coat of arms
- Location of Ribaute
- Location within France Location within Occitanie
- Coordinates: 43°06′31″N 2°38′09″E
- Country: France
- Region: Occitania
- Department: Aude
- Arrondissement: Narbonne
- Canton: Les Corbières
- Intercommunality: Région Lézignanaise, Corbières et Minervois

Government
  - Mayor (2020–2026): Alain Coste
- Area^{1}: 9.41 km^{2} (3.63 sq mi)
- Elevation: 100 m (330 ft)
- Highest elevation: 306 m (1,004 ft)
- Lowest elevation: 68 m (223 ft)
- Population (2023): 262
  - Density: 27.8/km^{2} (72.1/sq mi)
- Time zone: UTC+01:00 (CET)
  - Summer (DST): UTC+02:00 (CEST)
- INSEE/Postal code: 11311 /11220
- ^{1} French Land Register data, which excludes lakes, ponds, glaciers > 1 km^{2} (0.386 sq mi or 247 acres) and river estuaries.

Ribaute (French pronunciation: [ʁibot]; Occitan: Ribauta) is a commune in the Aude department in southern France.

== Geography ==
The village lies on the right bank of the Orbieu, which flows northeast through the commune.

== Population ==
Historical population
Year	Pop.	±% p.a.
1968	285	—
1975	254	−1.63%
1982	232	−1.29%
1990	190	−2.47%
1999	227	+2.00%
2007	213	−0.79%
2012	296	+6.80%
2017	276	−1.39%
2023	262	−0.86%
Source: INSEE

== See also ==
- Corbières AOC
- Communes of the Aude department
