= Boutenac =

Commune in Occitanie, France

- Commune
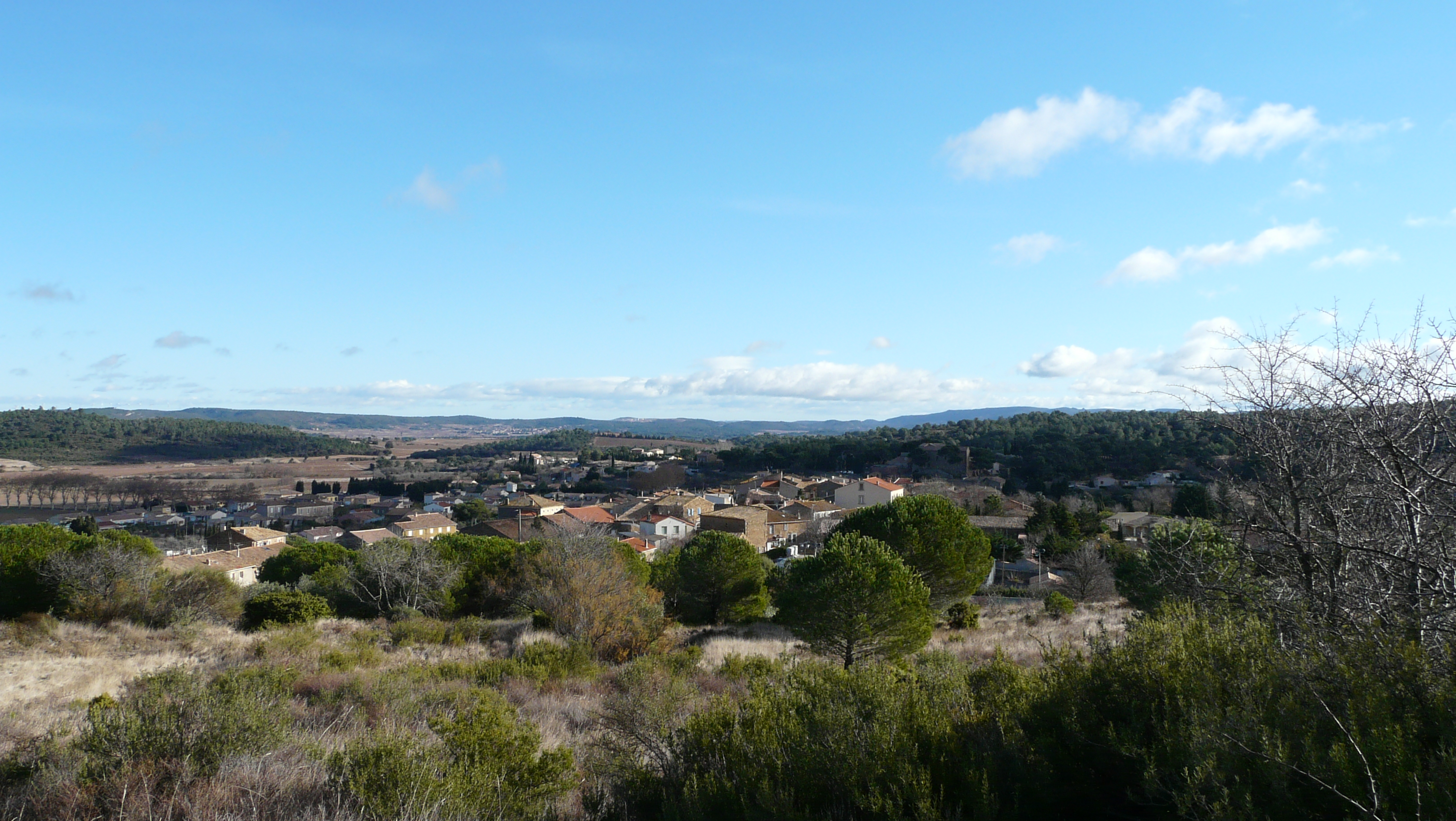
- A general view of Boutenac

- Coat of arms
- Location of Boutenac
- Location within France Location within Occitanie
- Coordinates: 43°08′54″N 2°47′28″E
- Country: France
- Region: Occitania
- Department: Aude
- Arrondissement: Narbonne
- Canton: Les Corbières
- Intercommunality: Région Lézignanaise, Corbières et Minervois

Government
  - Mayor (2020–2026): Alain Mailhac
- Area^{1}: 22.96 km^{2} (8.86 sq mi)
- Elevation: 90 m (300 ft)
- Highest elevation: 265 m (869 ft)
- Lowest elevation: 36 m (118 ft)
- Population (2023): 747
  - Density: 32.5/km^{2} (84.3/sq mi)
- Time zone: UTC+01:00 (CET)
  - Summer (DST): UTC+02:00 (CEST)
- INSEE/Postal code: 11048 /11200
- ^{1} French Land Register data, which excludes lakes, ponds, glaciers > 1 km^{2} (0.386 sq mi or 247 acres) and river estuaries.

Boutenac (French pronunciation: [butnak]; Occitan: Botenac) is a commune in the Aude department in southern France.

== Church ==
In 1850, a French female artist named Béloya Collin gave a painting of Christ on a cross to the church of Boutenac.

== Population ==
Historical population
Year	Pop.	±% p.a.
1968	622	—
1975	581	−0.97%
1982	524	−1.46%
1990	519	−0.12%
1999	609	+1.79%
2007	690	+1.57%
2012	704	+0.40%
2017	721	+0.48%
2023	747	+0.59%
Source: INSEE

== See also ==
- Corbières AOC
- Communes of the Aude department
