= Montgaillard, Aude =

Commune in Occitanie, France

Montgaillard
- Commune
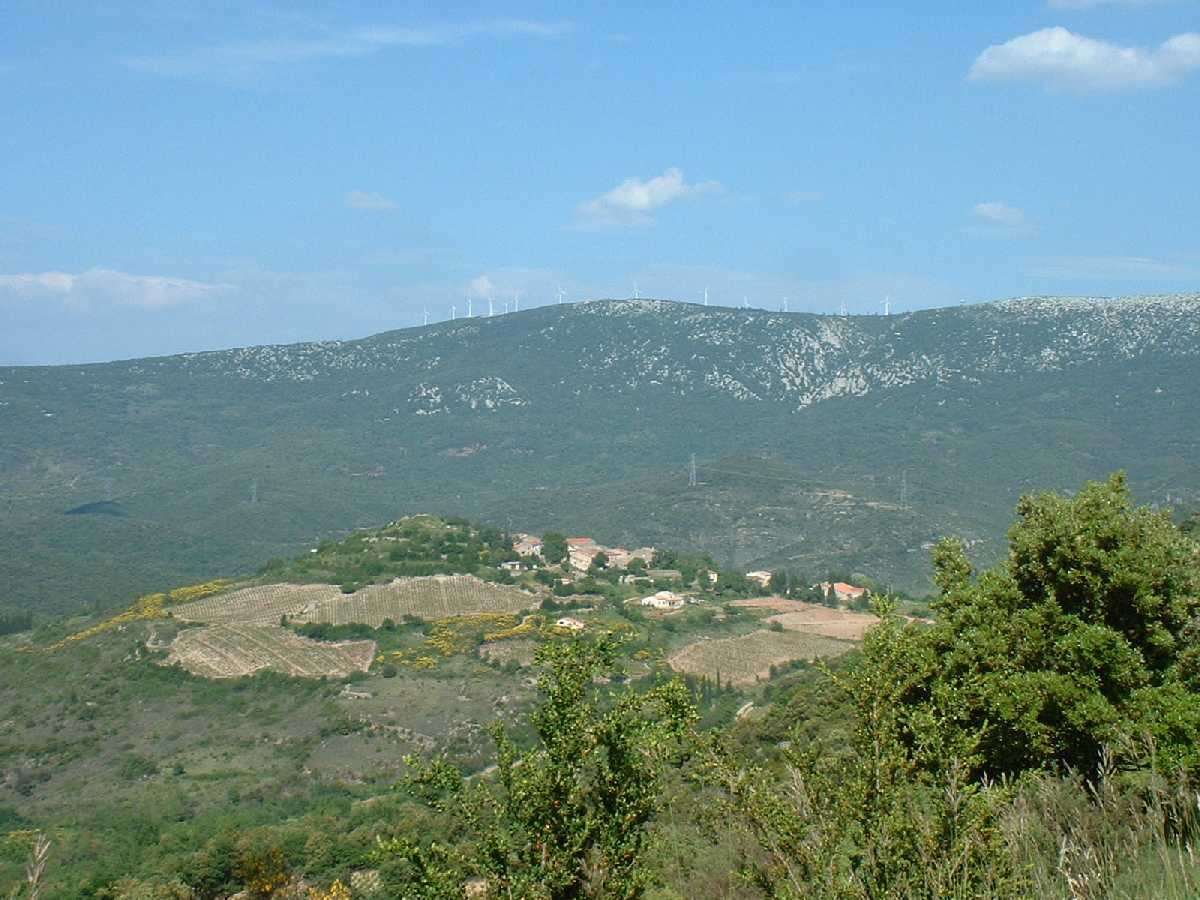
- A general view of Montgaillard

- Coat of arms
- Location of Montgaillard
- Location within France Location within Occitanie
- Coordinates: 42°54′41″N 2°37′30″E
- Country: France
- Region: Occitania
- Department: Aude
- Arrondissement: Narbonne
- Canton: Les Corbières

Government
  - Mayor (2020–2026): Michel Larrégola
- Area^{1}: 16.72 km^{2} (6.46 sq mi)
- Elevation: 420 m (1,380 ft)
- Highest elevation: 920 m (3,020 ft)
- Lowest elevation: 240 m (790 ft)
- Population (2023): 38
  - Density: 2.3/km^{2} (5.9/sq mi)
- Time zone: UTC+01:00 (CET)
  - Summer (DST): UTC+02:00 (CEST)
- INSEE/Postal code: 11245 /11330
- ^{1} French Land Register data, which excludes lakes, ponds, glaciers > 1 km^{2} (0.386 sq mi or 247 acres) and river estuaries.

Montgaillard (French pronunciation: [mɔ̃ɡajaʁ]; Occitan: Montgalhard) is a commune in the Aude department in southern France.

== Population ==
Historical population
Year	Pop.	±% p.a.
1968	44	—
1975	37	−2.44%
1982	34	−1.20%
1990	51	+5.20%
1999	51	+0.00%
2007	57	+1.40%
2012	50	−2.59%
2017	42	−3.43%
2023	38	−1.65%
Source: INSEE

== See also ==
- Corbières AOC
- Communes of the Aude department
