= Jonquières, Aude =

Commune in Occitanie, France

Jonquières
- Commune
- Coat of arms
- Location of Jonquières
- Location within France Location within Occitanie
- Coordinates: 43°02′27″N 2°43′49″E
- Country: France
- Region: Occitania
- Department: Aude
- Arrondissement: Narbonne
- Canton: Les Corbières

Government
  - Mayor (2020–2026): Jacques Piraud
- Area^{1}: 13.66 km^{2} (5.27 sq mi)
- Elevation: 272 m (892 ft)
- Highest elevation: 380 m (1,250 ft)
- Lowest elevation: 177 m (581 ft)
- Population (2023): 45
  - Density: 3.3/km^{2} (8.5/sq mi)
- Time zone: UTC+01:00 (CET)
  - Summer (DST): UTC+02:00 (CEST)
- INSEE/Postal code: 11176 /11220
- ^{1} French Land Register data, which excludes lakes, ponds, glaciers > 1 km^{2} (0.386 sq mi or 247 acres) and river estuaries.

Jonquières (French pronunciation: [ʒɔ̃kjɛʁ]; Occitan: Jonquièras) is a commune in the Aude department in southern France.

== Population ==
Historical population
Year	Pop.	±% p.a.
1968	55	—
1975	55	+0.00%
1982	54	−0.26%
1990	38	−4.30%
1999	46	+2.15%
2007	71	+5.58%
2012	58	−3.96%
2017	59	+0.34%
2023	45	−4.41%
Source: INSEE

== See also ==
- Corbières AOC
- Communes of the Aude department
