= Cascastel-des-Corbières =

Commune in Occitanie, France

- Commune
- Coat of arms
- Location of Cascastel-des-Corbières
- Location within France Location within Occitanie
- Coordinates: 42°59′09″N 2°45′35″E
- Country: France
- Region: Occitania
- Department: Aude
- Arrondissement: Narbonne
- Canton: Les Corbières
- Intercommunality: Région Lézignanaise, Corbières et Minervois

Government
  - Mayor (2020–2026): Didier Casato
- Area^{1}: 15.38 km^{2} (5.94 sq mi)
- Elevation: 135 m (443 ft)
- Highest elevation: 509 m (1,670 ft)
- Lowest elevation: 111 m (364 ft)
- Population (2023): 212
  - Density: 13.8/km^{2} (35.7/sq mi)
- Time zone: UTC+01:00 (CET)
  - Summer (DST): UTC+02:00 (CEST)
- INSEE/Postal code: 11071 /11360
- Website: https://cascastelchateau.fr/
- ^{1} French Land Register data, which excludes lakes, ponds, glaciers > 1 km^{2} (0.386 sq mi or 247 acres) and river estuaries.

Cascastel-des-Corbières (French pronunciation: [kaskastɛl de kɔʁbjɛʁ]; Occitan: Caçcastèl de las Corbièras) is a commune in the Aude department in southern France.

Amenities include a post office, a primary school, and a town hall with a municipal government. The locals are known as the Cascastellois.

The surrounding area is host to medieval-era citadels that are open to the public. The beaches of Leucate and the Cathar castles are nearby.

== Population ==
Historical population
Year	Pop.	±% p.a.
1968	268	—
1975	234	−1.92%
1982	214	−1.27%
1990	204	−0.60%
1999	196	−0.44%
2007	208	+0.75%
2012	222	+1.31%
2017	221	−0.09%
2023	212	−0.69%
Source: INSEE

== See also ==
- Fitou AOC
- Corbières AOC
- Communes of the Aude department
