= Villerouge-Termenès =

Commune in Occitania, France

- Commune
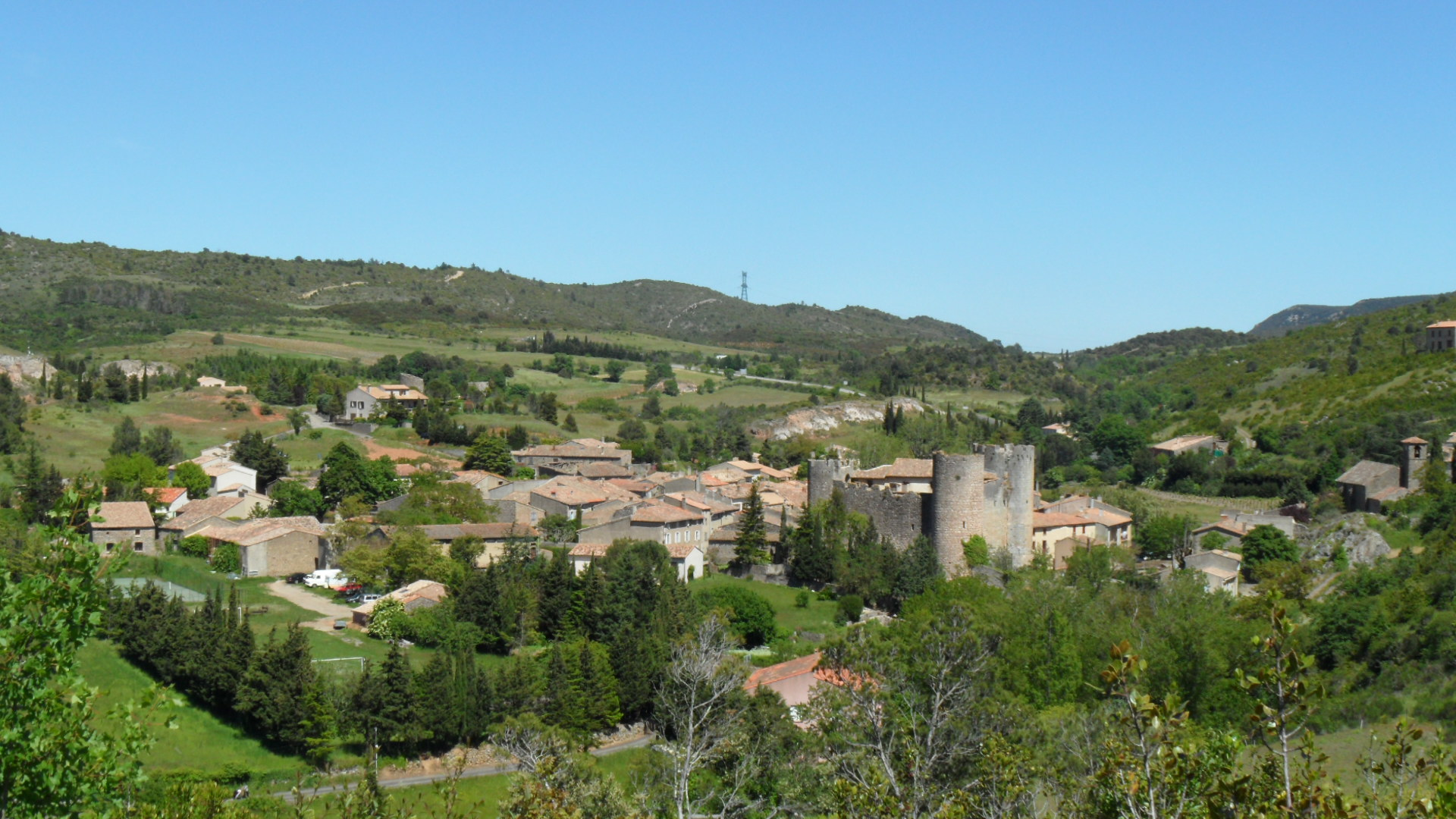
- A general view of Villerouge

- Coat of arms
- Location of Villerouge-Termenès
- Location within France Location within Occitanie
- Coordinates: 43°00′28″N 2°37′44″E
- Country: France
- Region: Occitania
- Department: Aude
- Arrondissement: Narbonne
- Canton: Les Corbières

Government
  - Mayor (2020–2026): Michel Ponçot
- Area^{1}: 19.41 km^{2} (7.49 sq mi)
- Elevation: 325 m (1,066 ft)
- Highest elevation: 620 m (2,030 ft)
- Lowest elevation: 272 m (892 ft)
- Population (2023): 165
  - Density: 8.50/km^{2} (22.0/sq mi)
- Time zone: UTC+01:00 (CET)
  - Summer (DST): UTC+02:00 (CEST)
- INSEE/Postal code: 11435 /11330
- ^{1} French Land Register data, which excludes lakes, ponds, glaciers > 1 km^{2} (0.386 sq mi or 247 acres) and river estuaries.

Villerouge-Termenès (French pronunciation: [vilʁuʒ tɛʁmənɛs]; Languedocien: Vilaroja de Termenés, before 1962: Villerouge) is a commune in the Aude department in southern France.

== Population ==
Historical population
Year	Pop.	±% p.a.
1968	176	—
1975	140	−3.22%
1982	146	+0.60%
1990	154	+0.67%
1999	158	+0.29%
2007	158	+0.00%
2012	145	−1.70%
2017	147	+0.27%
2023	165	+1.94%
Source: INSEE

== See also ==
- Corbières Massif
- Corbières AOC
- Communes of the Aude department
