= Massac, Aude =

Commune in Occitanie, France

Massac
- Commune
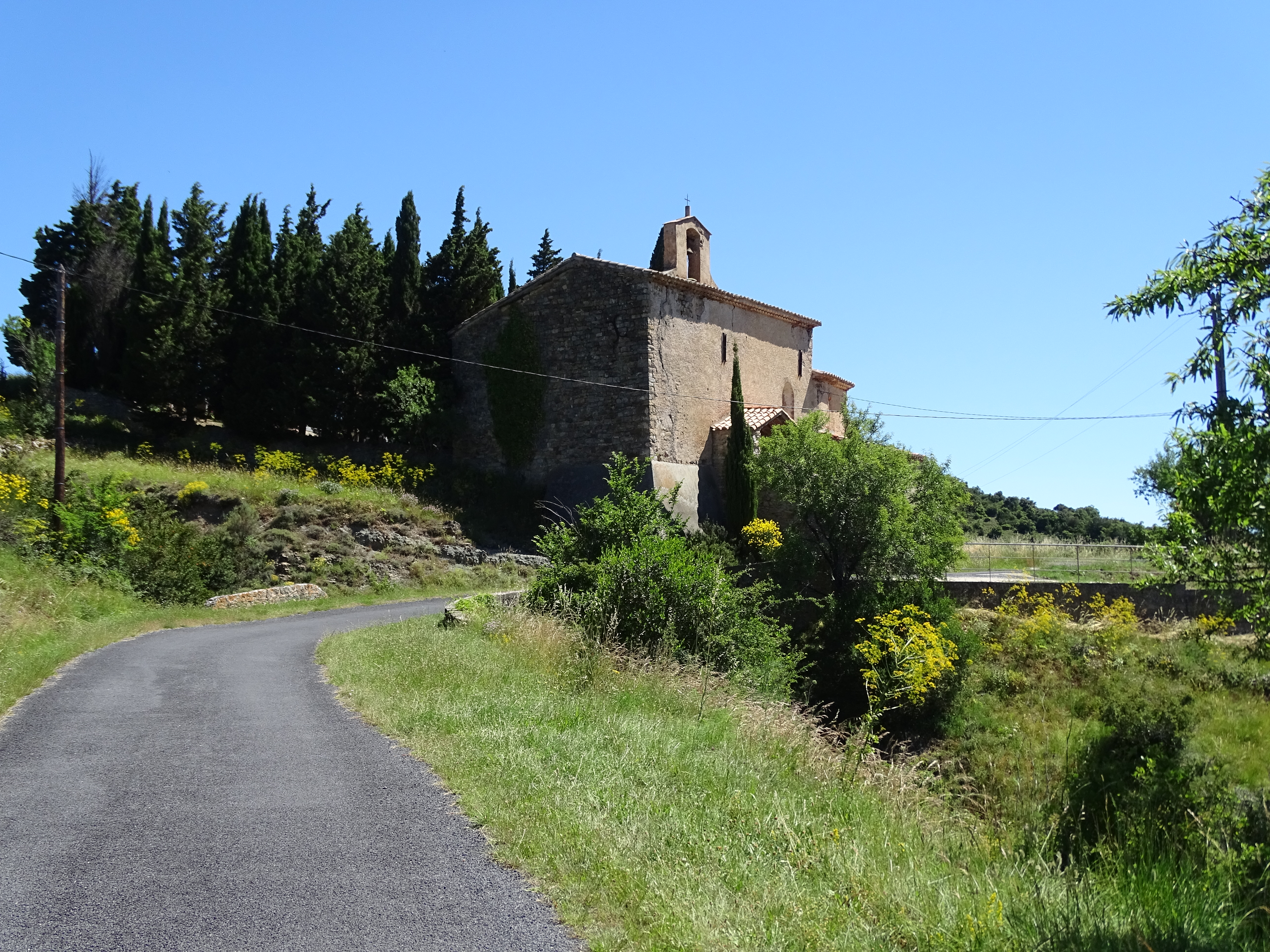
- The church in Massac

- Coat of arms
- Location of Massac
- Location within France Location within Occitanie
- Coordinates: 42°55′10″N 2°34′26″E
- Country: France
- Region: Occitania
- Department: Aude
- Arrondissement: Narbonne
- Canton: Les Corbières

Government
  - Mayor (2022–2026): Isabelle Farges
- Area^{1}: 11.89 km^{2} (4.59 sq mi)
- Elevation: 465 m (1,526 ft)
- Highest elevation: 907 m (2,976 ft)
- Lowest elevation: 435 m (1,427 ft)
- Population (2023): 30
  - Density: 2.5/km^{2} (6.5/sq mi)
- Time zone: UTC+01:00 (CET)
  - Summer (DST): UTC+02:00 (CEST)
- INSEE/Postal code: 11224 /11330
- ^{1} French Land Register data, which excludes lakes, ponds, glaciers > 1 km^{2} (0.386 sq mi or 247 acres) and river estuaries.

Massac (French pronunciation: [masak]) is a commune in the Aude department in southern France.

== Population ==
Historical population
Year	Pop.	±% p.a.
1968	36	—
1975	27	−4.03%
1982	32	+2.46%
1990	22	−4.58%
1999	20	−1.05%
2007	27	+3.82%
2012	30	+2.13%
2017	29	−0.68%
2023	30	+0.57%
Source: INSEE

== See also ==
- Communes of the Aude department
