= Salza, Aude =

Commune in Occitanie, France

Salza
- Commune
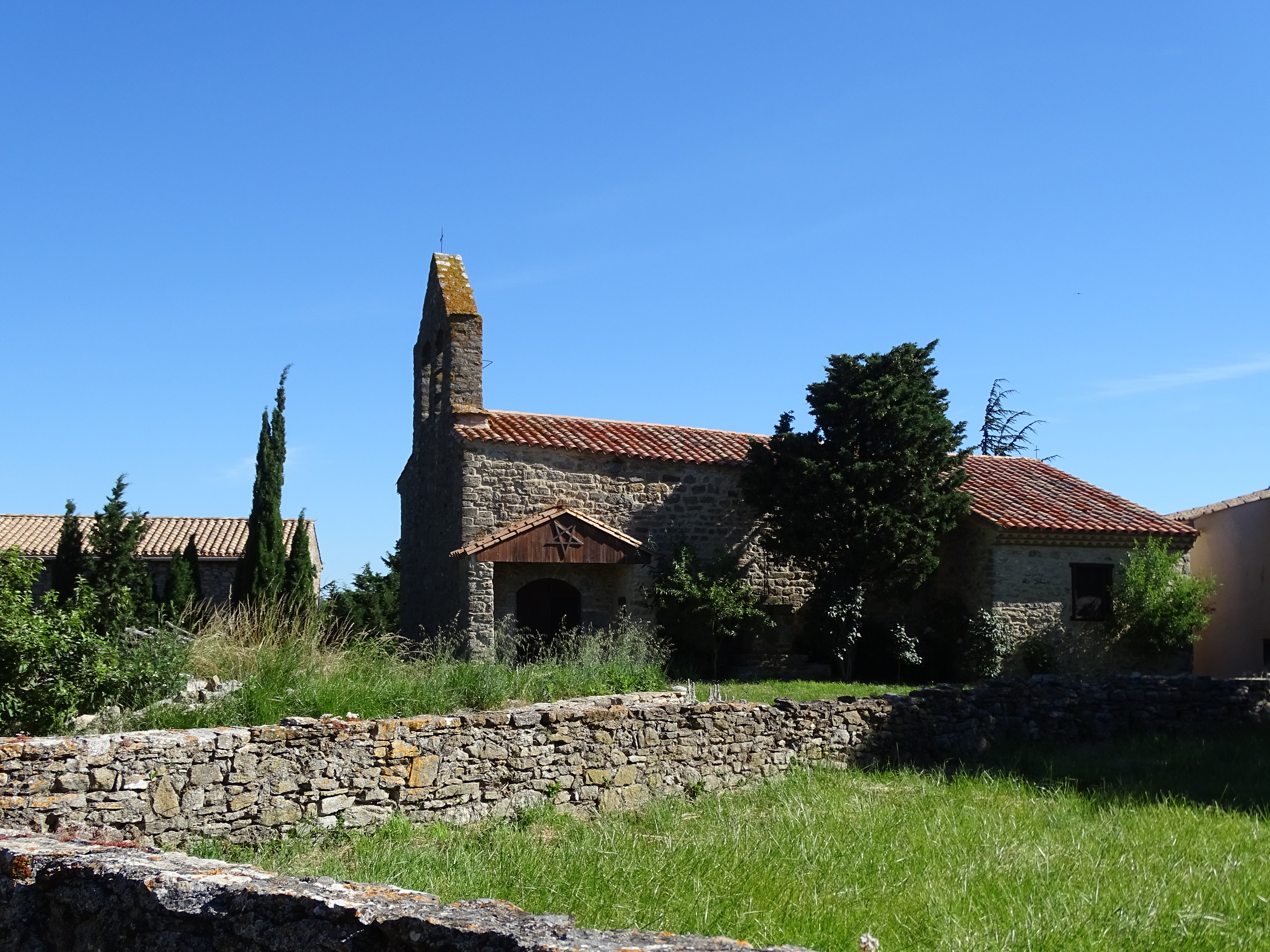
- The church in Salza

- Coat of arms
- Location of Salza
- Location within France Location within Occitanie
- Coordinates: 42°59′04″N 2°29′50″E
- Country: France
- Region: Occitania
- Department: Aude
- Arrondissement: Narbonne
- Canton: Les Corbières

Government
  - Mayor (2020–2026): Redha Mennad
- Area^{1}: 8.34 km^{2} (3.22 sq mi)
- Elevation: 504 m (1,654 ft)
- Highest elevation: 694 m (2,277 ft)
- Lowest elevation: 360 m (1,180 ft)
- Population (2023): 29
  - Density: 3.5/km^{2} (9.0/sq mi)
- Time zone: UTC+01:00 (CET)
  - Summer (DST): UTC+02:00 (CEST)
- INSEE/Postal code: 11374 /11330
- ^{1} French Land Register data, which excludes lakes, ponds, glaciers > 1 km^{2} (0.386 sq mi or 247 acres) and river estuaries.

Salza (French pronunciation: [salza]; Occitan: Salzan) is a commune in the Aude department in southern France.

== Population ==
Historical population
Year	Pop.	±% p.a.
1968	18	—
1975	10	−8.05%
1982	20	+10.41%
1990	19	−0.64%
1999	22	+1.64%
2007	18	−2.48%
2012	18	+0.00%
2017	17	−1.14%
2023	29	+9.31%
Source: INSEE

== See also ==
- Communes of the Aude department
