= Thézan-des-Corbières =

Commune in Occitanie, France

- Commune
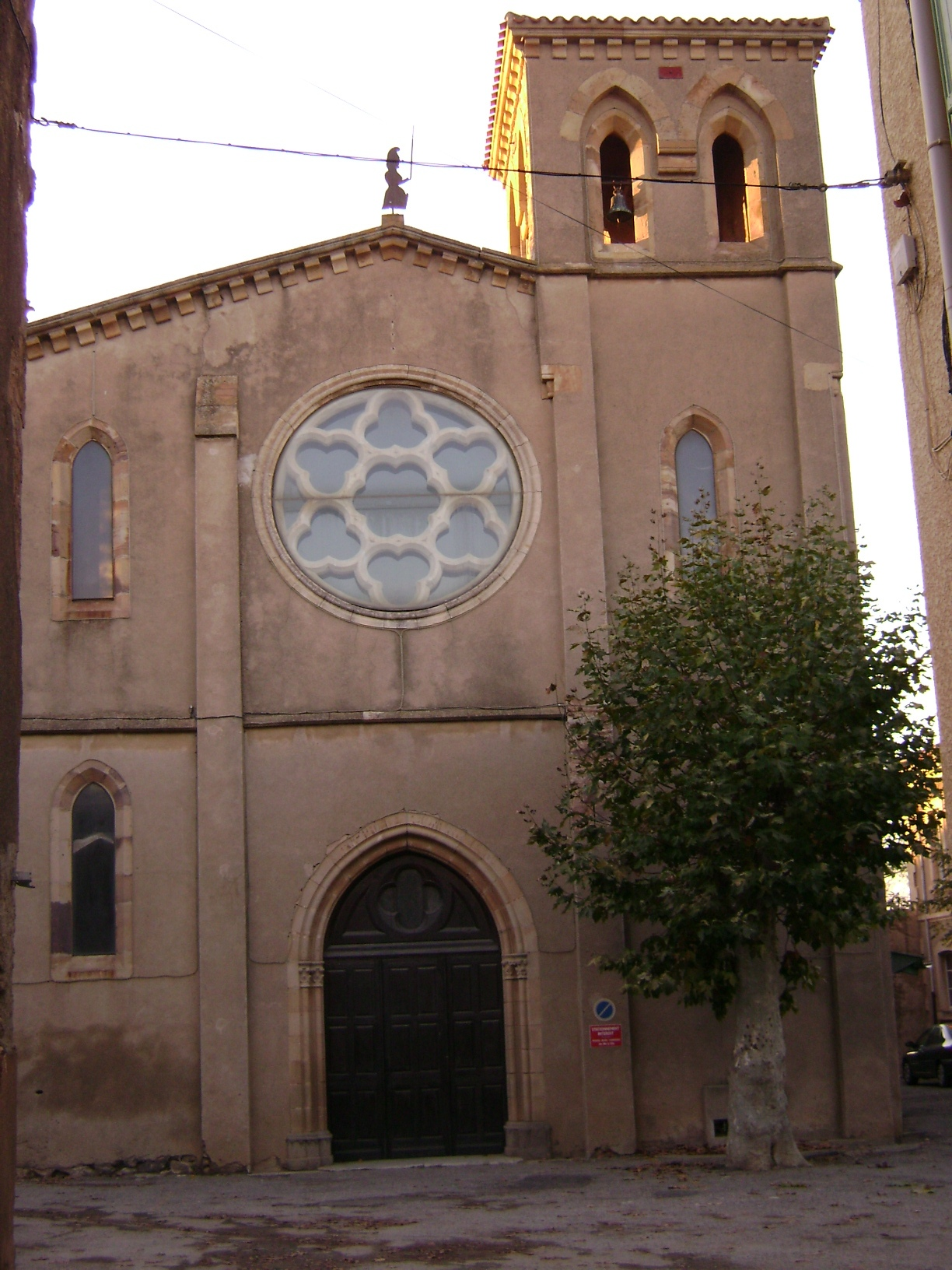
- The church in Thézan-des-Corbières

- Coat of arms
- Location of Thézan-des-Corbières
- Location within France Location within Occitanie
- Coordinates: 43°06′16″N 2°46′19″E
- Country: France
- Region: Occitania
- Department: Aude
- Arrondissement: Narbonne
- Canton: Les Corbières

Government
  - Mayor (2020–2026): Philippe Puech
- Area^{1}: 26.38 km^{2} (10.19 sq mi)
- Elevation: 100 m (330 ft)
- Highest elevation: 365 m (1,198 ft)
- Lowest elevation: 75 m (246 ft)
- Population (2023): 573
  - Density: 21.7/km^{2} (56.3/sq mi)
- Time zone: UTC+01:00 (CET)
  - Summer (DST): UTC+02:00 (CEST)
- INSEE/Postal code: 11390 /11200
- ^{1} French Land Register data, which excludes lakes, ponds, glaciers > 1 km^{2} (0.386 sq mi or 247 acres) and river estuaries.

Thézan-des-Corbières is a commune in the Aude department in southern France.

== Population ==
Historical population
Year	Pop.	±% p.a.
1968	633	—
1975	542	−2.19%
1982	527	−0.40%
1990	514	−0.31%
1999	515	+0.02%
2007	525	+0.24%
2012	532	+0.27%
2017	544	+0.45%
2023	573	+0.87%
Source: INSEE

== See also ==
- Corbières AOC
- Communes of the Aude department
