= Château de Saint-Martin de Toques =

Castle in Aude, southern France

Coordinates: 43.1289°N 2.8691°E

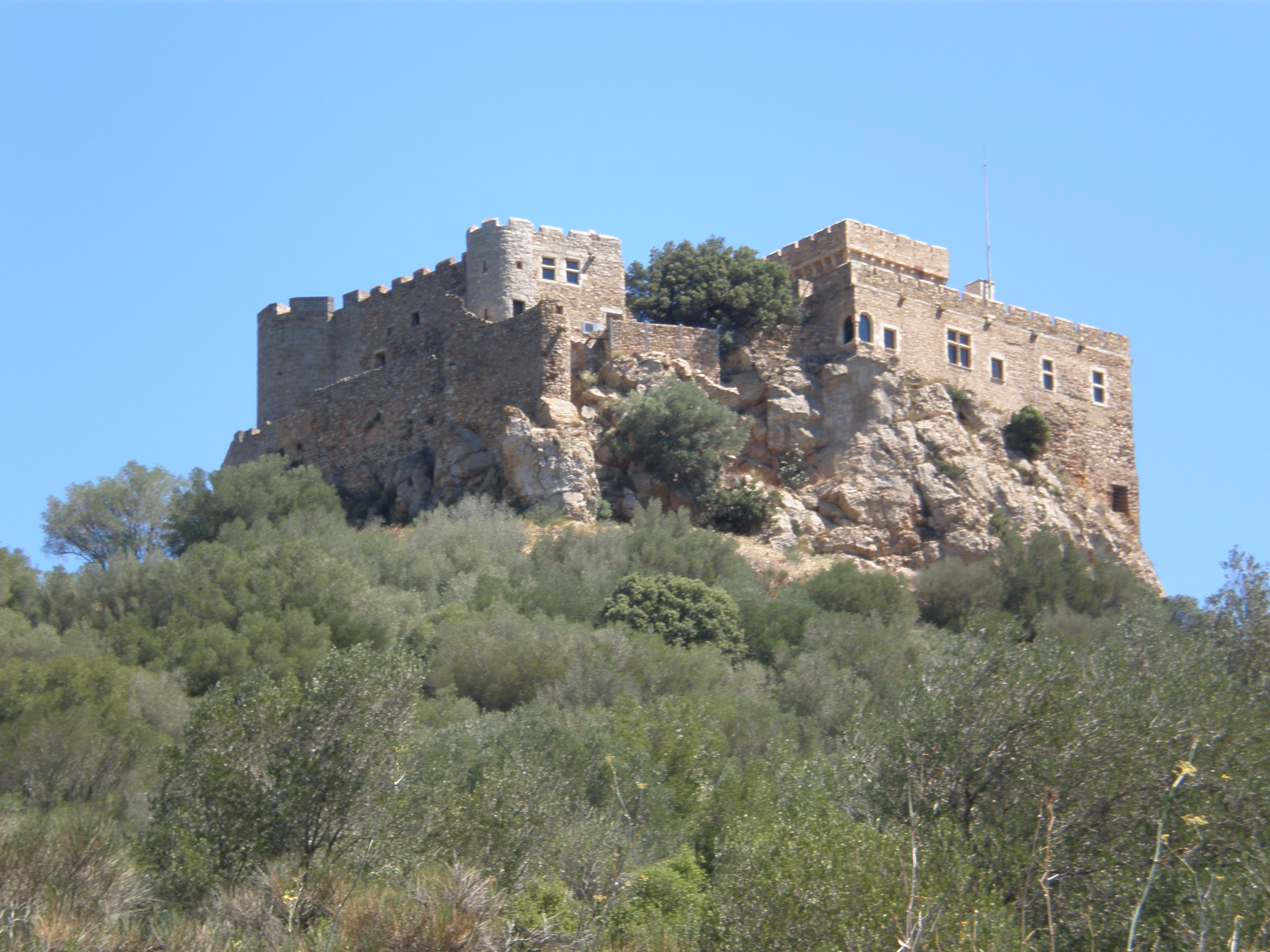
- Interactive map of the Château de Saint-Martin de Toques area

General information
- Location: Bizanet commune, Aude département, southern France
- Construction started: 12th to 14th century
- Owner: Private

The Château de Saint-Martin de Toques is a partly ruined, mountaintop castle in the Bizanet commune in the Aude département of southern France.

Construction of the castle dates to the 12th and 14th centuries. It was later owned by the Viscounts of Narbonne. In the sixteenth century, an Italian family took over the castle. At the beginning of the seventeenth century, it was converted into a farm property, but was abandoned and fell into ruin.

The castle is now privately owned and has been listed since 1926 as a monument historique by the French Ministry of Culture.

== See also ==
- List of castles in France
