= Escales =

Commune in Occitanie, France

- Commune
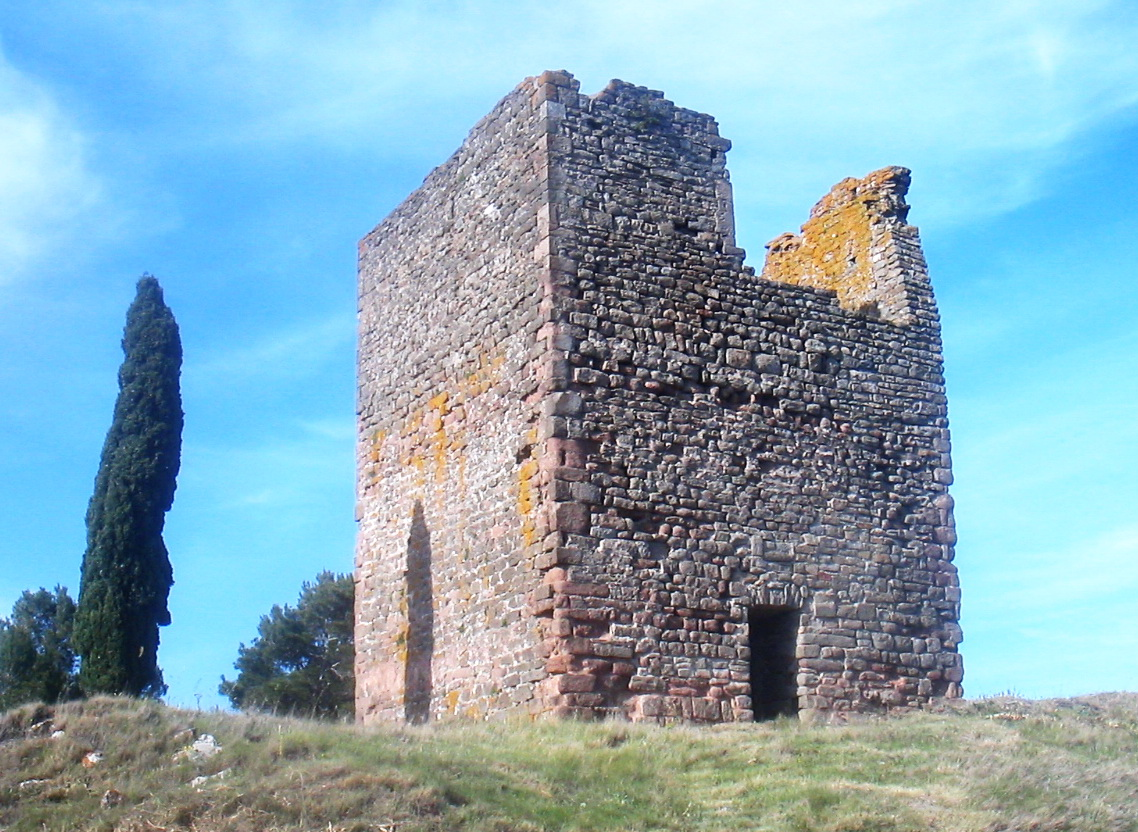
- Roman tower

- Coat of arms
- Location of Escales
- Location within France Location within Occitanie
- Coordinates: 43°13′29″N 2°41′45″E
- Country: France
- Region: Occitania
- Department: Aude
- Arrondissement: Narbonne
- Canton: Le Lézignanais

Government
  - Mayor (2020–2026): Henry Schénato
- Area^{1}: 10.18 km^{2} (3.93 sq mi)
- Elevation: 55 m (180 ft)
- Highest elevation: 201 m (659 ft)
- Lowest elevation: 52 m (171 ft)
- Population (2023): 512
  - Density: 50.3/km^{2} (130/sq mi)
- Time zone: UTC+01:00 (CET)
  - Summer (DST): UTC+02:00 (CEST)
- INSEE/Postal code: 11126 /11200
- ^{1} French Land Register data, which excludes lakes, ponds, glaciers > 1 km^{2} (0.386 sq mi or 247 acres) and river estuaries.

Escales (French pronunciation: [ɛskal]; Occitan: Escalas) is a commune in the Aude department in southern France, principally involved in viticulture.

== Geography ==
Escales lies in the northernmost part of the Corbières AOC wine growing area 30 km from Narbonne to the east, and 30 km from Carcassonne to the west.

== Population ==
Historical population
Year	Pop.	±% p.a.
1968	410	—
1975	317	−3.61%
1982	275	−2.01%
1990	316	+1.75%
1999	336	+0.68%
2007	358	+0.80%
2012	412	+2.85%
2017	465	+2.45%
2023	512	+1.62%
Source: INSEE

== Economy ==
Escales benefits greatly from its wine. It has a small factory called 'Le Progres' which joined forces with a neighbouring factory in Tourouzelle in 2006 to manufacture red, white and rose wines. The factory was built in 1933 when 133 local winegrowers produced 10,210 hectolitres of wine.

== Personalities ==
Achille Mir, an Occitan poet of note lived in the village between 1801-1879.

== Landmarks ==
Within the boundary of the commune there are two important landmarks, the old tower which necessitates a walk through a wooded hillside, the other the church, which is situated in the centre of the village.

=== The tower ===
A good example of a square fortress tower which stands south-east of the village approximately 1 km away. The village cannot now be seen from the tower base as the surrounding area is now wooded, however it is 100 metres higher than the village itself. Nowadays it lacks a large portion of the castellation. It was abandoned during the 17th century where until that time it was a quadrangular-shaped manorial home, with 1.90 metre thick walls. The tower was renovated and heightened in the 11th century from 6 metres to 18 metres in height. Its dual purpose was as a look-out tower preventing Spanish invaders marching on Carcassonne, and a signaling tower using two lit torches sited on the upper platform. The upper platform was re-strengthened in 1980 where originally the main living area would have been found. Recent excavations have unearthed many pieces of black pottery and glass bottle shards which confirmed occupation from the beginning of the 11th century to the 15th century by a colony of Jews. According to legend, the original tower was built in Roman times.

=== The spring ===
Directly beside the church, the spring still works today. From the 2nd century onwards it was given the name 'Fontaine de Goltron'. It is also mentioned in an act of 1096 under the name of Fontaine de Goltrem. Originally the village of Escales was called la Tourette, and in Roman times this small village expanded around the spring.

=== The church ===
An impressive example of a Romanesque church is centred in the village. Built on the site of a spring, it has been added to in the 18th and 19th centuries, but the main building with the distinction of three apses, a large central one and two smaller ones on either side, dates back to the 11th century. The altar is constructed from a first or second-century Roman marble sarcophagus.

== See also ==
- Corbières AOC
- Communes of the Aude department
