= Fabrezan =

- Commune
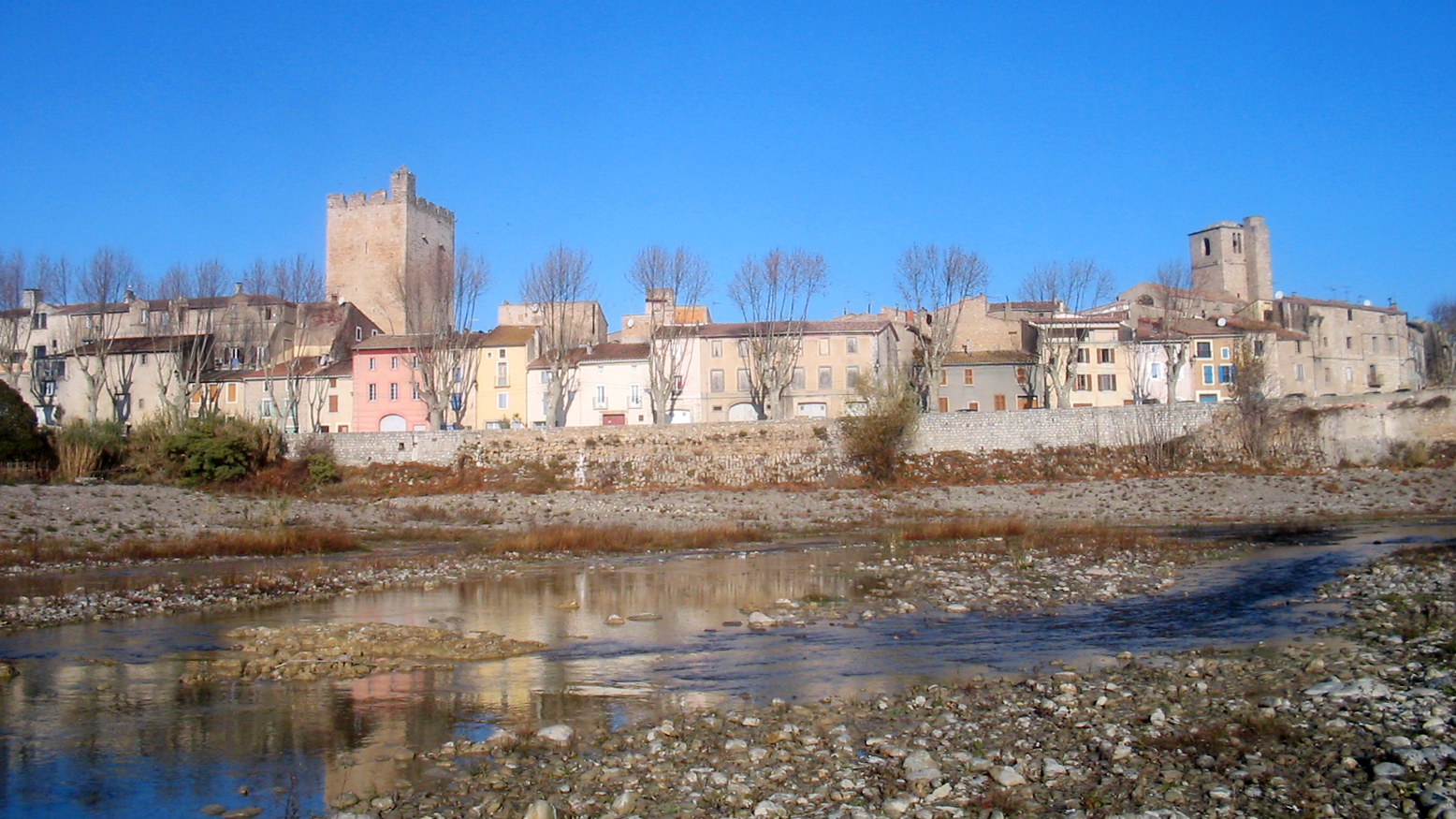
- A general view of Fabrezan and the Orbieu river

- Coat of arms
- Location of Fabrezan
- Location within France Location within Occitanie
- Coordinates: 43°08′11″N 2°41′52″E
- Country: France
- Region: Occitania
- Department: Aude
- Arrondissement: Narbonne
- Canton: Les Corbières
- Intercommunality: Région Lézignanaise, Corbières et Minervois

Government
  - Mayor (2020–2026): Isabelle Géa-Péris
- Area^{1}: 28.62 km^{2} (11.05 sq mi)
- Elevation: 68 m (223 ft)
- Highest elevation: 274 m (899 ft)
- Lowest elevation: 54 m (177 ft)
- Population (2023): 1,306
  - Density: 45.63/km^{2} (118.2/sq mi)
- Time zone: UTC+01:00 (CET)
  - Summer (DST): UTC+02:00 (CEST)
- INSEE/Postal code: 11132 /11200
- ^{1} French Land Register data, which excludes lakes, ponds, glaciers > 1 km^{2} (0.386 sq mi or 247 acres) and river estuaries.

Fabrezan (French pronunciation: [fabʁəzɑ̃]; Languedocien: Fabresan) is a commune in the Aude department in southern France.

== Geography ==
The village lies on the left bank of the Orbieu, at the confluent with the Nielle. Fabrezan is at the foot of the Montagne d'Alaric and is 7 km from Lézignan-Corbières and 10 km from Lagrasse. It is also 3 km from Ferrals-les-Corbières.

== Etymology ==
The village's name is derived from a Gallo-Roman villa: villa Fabriciana (from the name of the owner Fabricius, who was perhaps a veteran from Caesar's Legio X Equestris), in 947 there is a reference to In villa Fabriciano, in 1222 to Castrum de Fabrezano and in 1595 to Fabresan. In Occitan the village is known as Fabresàn

== History ==
In the Middle Ages the village was a fief held by the Viscounts of Narbonne. In 1382 during the Tuchin Revolt, Beatrix, the wife of Aimery VI, Viscount of Narbonne, and her children were besieged at Fabrezan by the citizens of Narbonne. Most of the 12th century keep from the original castle in which she was besieged still exists, but an upper floor was dismantled in 1628 and the Tour de Fabrezan is now only 30 meters high. It was classified as a monument historique in 1951. The Romanesque church of Saint-Étienne in the hamlet of Villerouge-la-Crémade which is part of the commune was also classified as a monument historique in 1982.

The French poet and inventor Charles Cros was born in Fabrezan in 1842. There is a small museum devoted to him, Le Musée Charles Cros, located at the Mairie or town hall. An annual music festival is held in the village in honor of Charles Cros.

== Population ==
Historical population
Year	Pop.	±% p.a.
1968	1,137	—
1975	1,024	−1.48%
1982	991	−0.47%
1990	1,046	+0.68%
1999	1,086	+0.42%
2007	1,231	+1.58%
2012	1,276	+0.72%
2017	1,291	+0.23%
2023	1,306	+0.19%
Source: INSEE

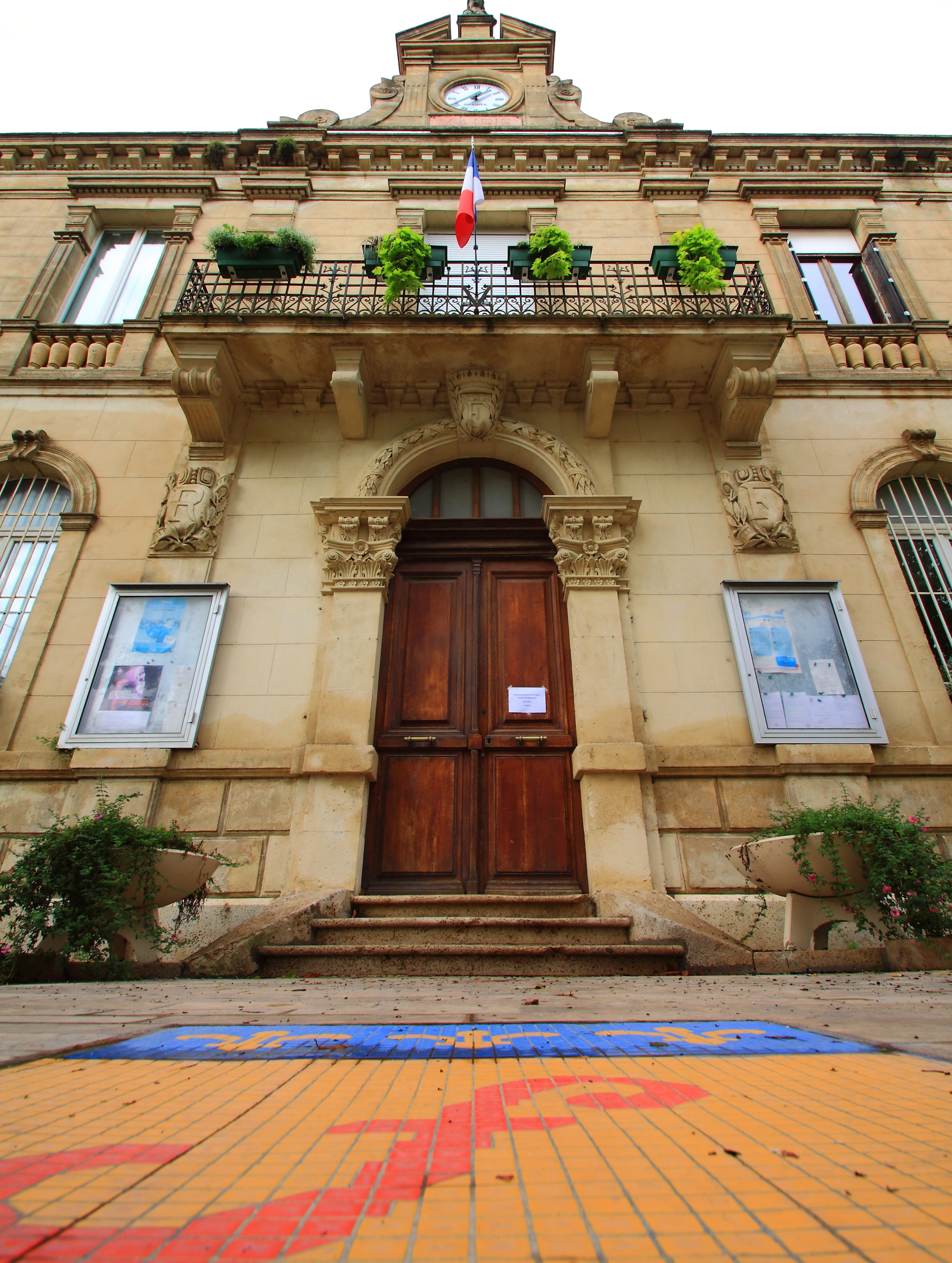
town hall

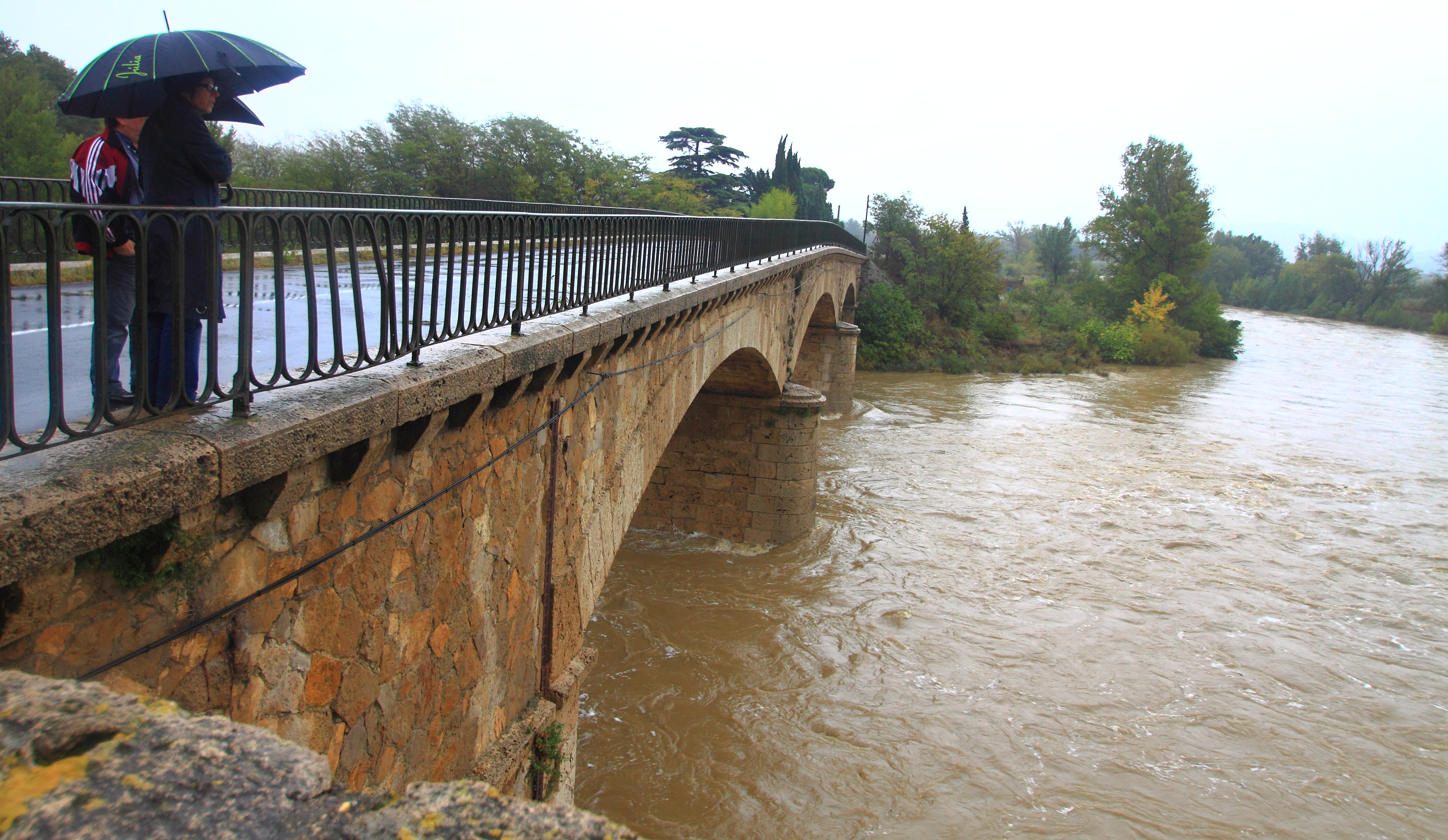
High water in October 2010

== See also ==
- Corbières AOC
- Communes of the Aude department
