= Auriac, Aude =

Commune in Occitanie, France

Auriac
- Commune
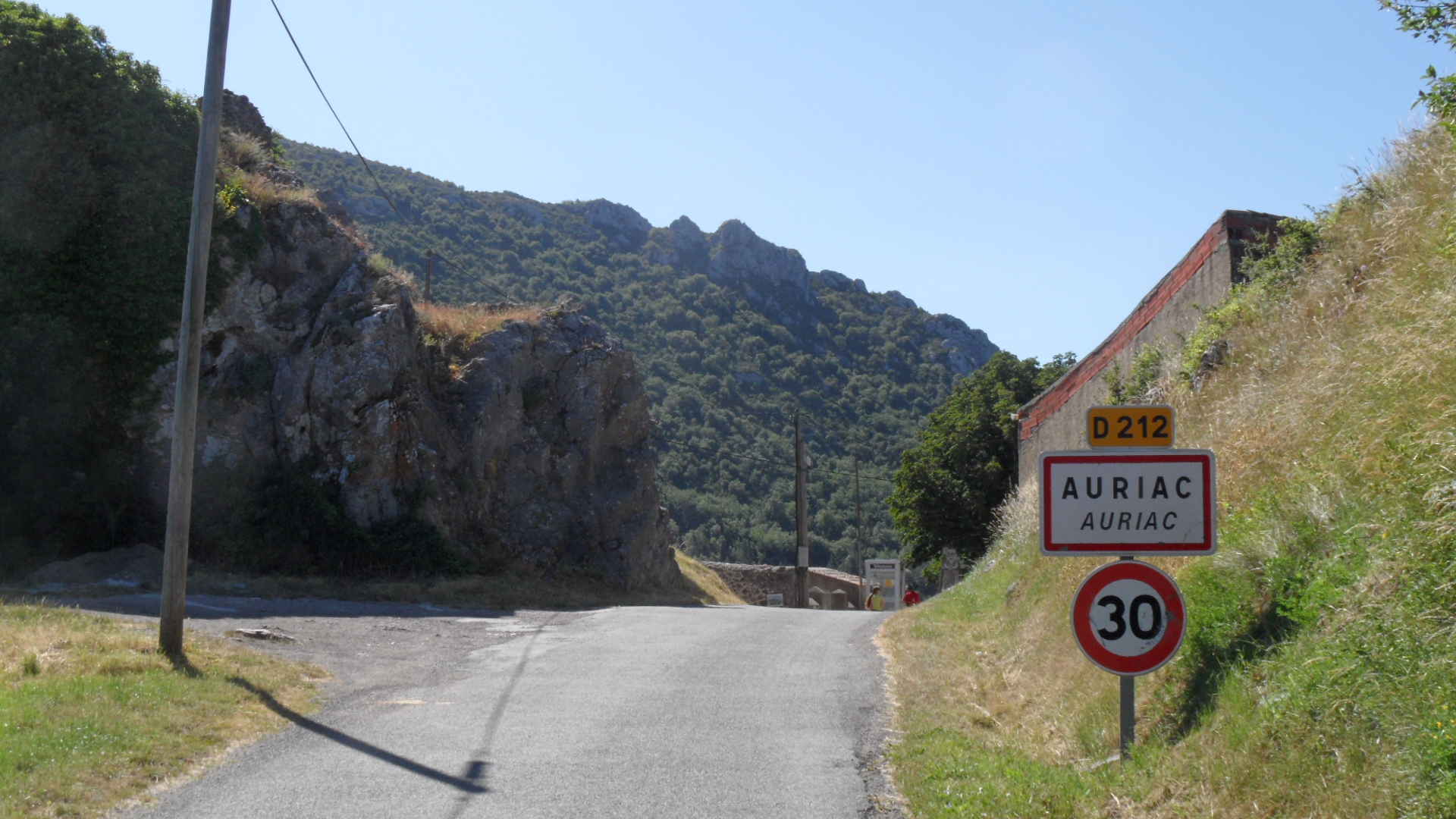
- The road into Auriac

- Coat of arms
- Location of Auriac
- Location within France Location within Occitanie
- Coordinates: 42°55′56″N 2°29′34″E
- Country: France
- Region: Occitania
- Department: Aude
- Arrondissement: Narbonne
- Canton: Les Corbières
- Intercommunality: CC Région Lézignanaise Corbières Minervois

Government
  - Mayor (2020–2026): Bernard Sutra
- Area^{1}: 20.93 km^{2} (8.08 sq mi)
- Elevation: 568 m (1,864 ft)
- Highest elevation: 907 m (2,976 ft)
- Lowest elevation: 356 m (1,168 ft)
- Population (2023): 33
  - Density: 1.6/km^{2} (4.1/sq mi)
- Time zone: UTC+01:00 (CET)
  - Summer (DST): UTC+02:00 (CEST)
- INSEE/Postal code: 11020 /11330
- ^{1} French Land Register data, which excludes lakes, ponds, glaciers > 1 km^{2} (0.386 sq mi or 247 acres) and river estuaries.

Auriac (French pronunciation: [oʁjak]) is a commune in the Aude department in the Occitanie region of southern France.

== Geography ==
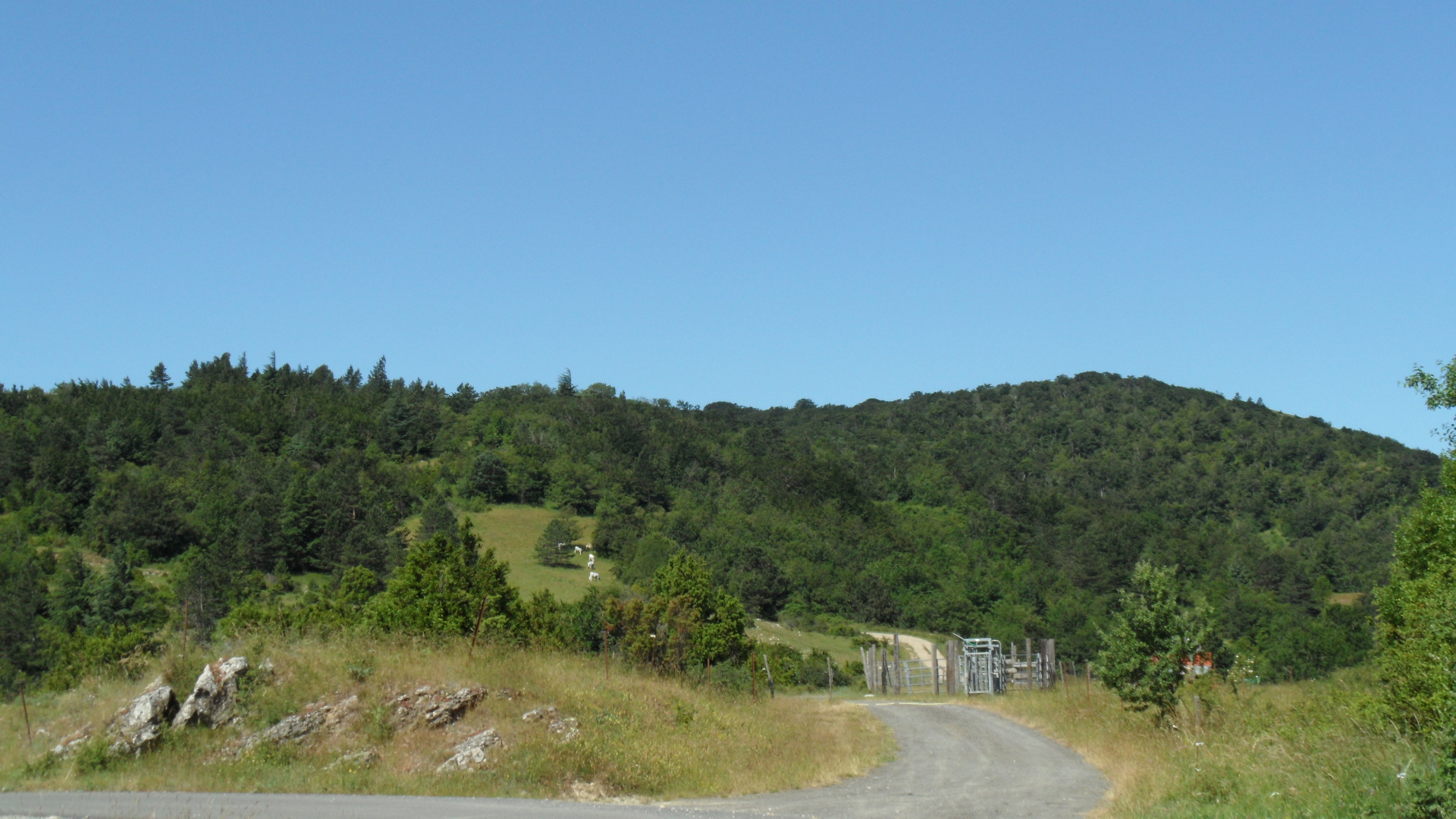
The Col de Redoulade

The commune is located in the Corbières Massif some 35 km south-east of Limoux and 15 km east of Arques. Access to the commune is by the D212 road which branches from the D613 west of Mouthoumet and goes south through the commune by a tortuous route then continues south to join the D10 north-east of Soulatgé. Apart from the village there are the hamlets of Savugnan in the south-west and La Grave north of the village. The whole of the commune is rugged and heavily forested.

Many streams rise all over the commune and flow northwards to join the Orbieu which flows through the commune from south-west to north to eventually join the Aude near Raissac-d'Aude.

=== Heraldry ===
Arms of Auriac	The official status of the blazon remains to be determined. Blazon: Argent, a fesse fusilly of Azure and Argent.

== Administration ==
List of Successive Mayors

From	To	Name
2001	2014	Yvette Fabre
2014	2020	Jean Simon
2020	2026	Bernard Sutra

== Demography ==
The inhabitants of the commune are known as Auriacois or Auriacoises in French.

Historical population

Year	Pop.	±% p.a.
1793	240	—
1821	271	+0.43%
1846	209	−1.03%
1872	216	+0.13%
1901	149	−1.27%
1926	103	−1.47%
1946	79	−1.32%
1962	73	−0.49%
1968	37	−10.71%

Year	Pop.	±% p.a.
1975	28	−3.90%
1982	25	−1.61%
1990	29	+1.87%
1999	35	+2.11%
2007	39	+1.36%
2012	33	−3.29%
2017	43	+5.44%
2023	33	−4.32%

Source: EHESS and INSEE

== Culture and heritage ==
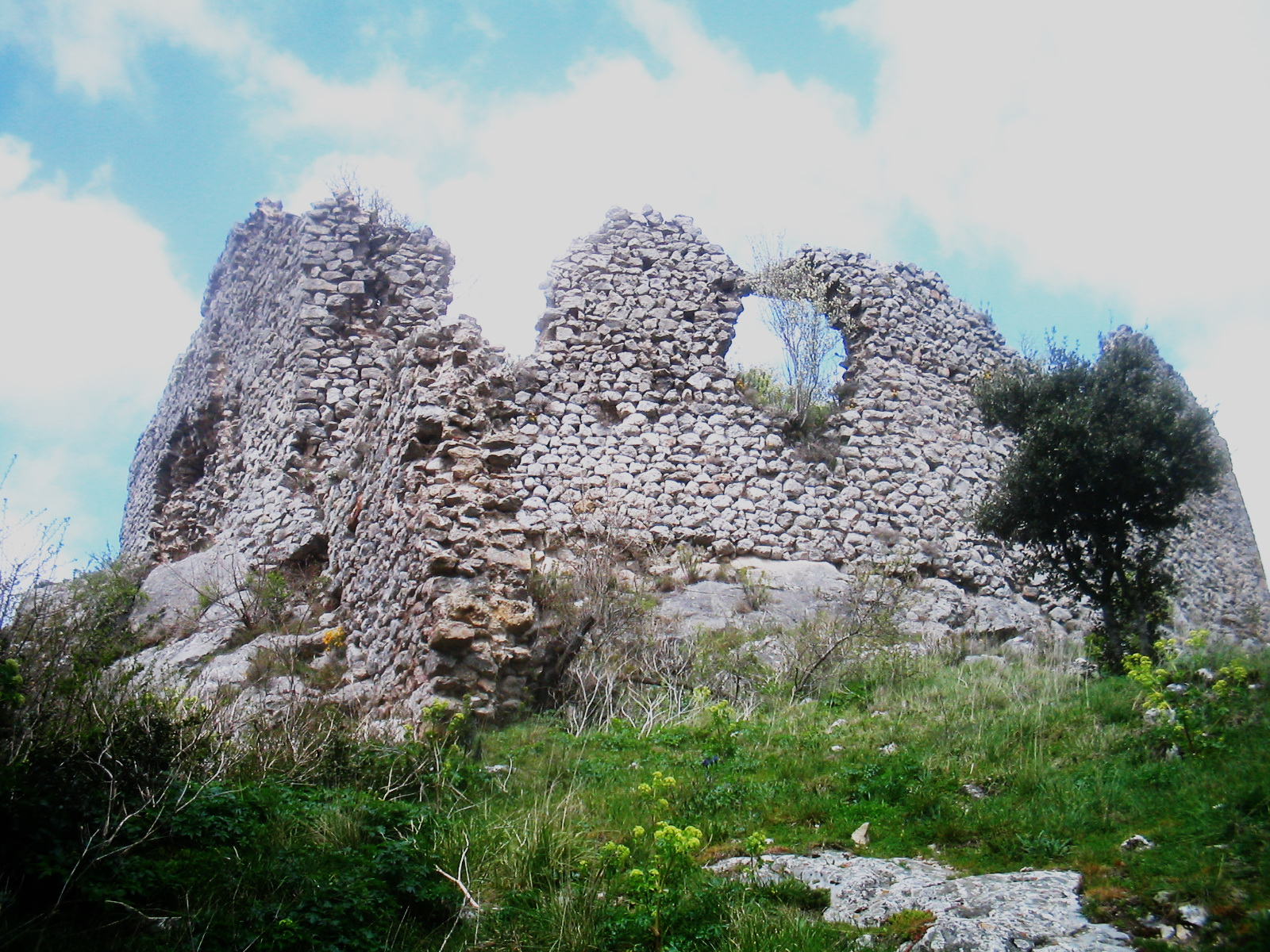
Ruins of the Chateau

=== Civil heritage ===
The commune has one building that is registered as an historical monument:

- The Ruins of a Chateau (11th century)

=== Religious heritage ===
The commune has one religious building that is registered as an historical monument:

- The Chapel of Saint-André (12th century) The Church contains one item that is registered as an historical object:
  - A Cope and Chasuble (18th century)

== See also ==
- Communes of the Aude department
