= Mayronnes =

Commune in Occitanie, France

- Commune
- Coat of arms
- Location of Mayronnes
- Location within France Location within Occitanie
- Coordinates: 43°03′27″N 2°31′33″E
- Country: France
- Region: Occitania
- Department: Aude
- Arrondissement: Carcassonne
- Canton: La Montagne d'Alaric
- Intercommunality: Carcassonne Agglo

Government
  - Mayor (2020–2026): Stéphane Poissy
- Area^{1}: 11.86 km^{2} (4.58 sq mi)
- Elevation: 203 m (666 ft)
- Highest elevation: 704 m (2,310 ft)
- Lowest elevation: 192 m (630 ft)
- Population (2023): 42
  - Density: 3.5/km^{2} (9.2/sq mi)
- Time zone: UTC+01:00 (CET)
  - Summer (DST): UTC+02:00 (CEST)
- INSEE/Postal code: 11227 /11220
- ^{1} French Land Register data, which excludes lakes, ponds, glaciers > 1 km^{2} (0.386 sq mi or 247 acres) and river estuaries.

Mayronnes (French pronunciation: [mɛʁɔn]; Occitan: Maironas) is a commune in the Aude department in southern France.

== Geography ==
The commune is located in the Corbières Massif.

The village lies in the northwestern part of the commune, on the left bank of the Madourneille brook, a tributary of the Orbieu, which forms part of the commune's southeastern border.

== Population ==
Historical population
Year	Pop.	±% p.a.
1968	24	—
1975	46	+9.74%
1982	38	−2.69%
1990	40	+0.64%
1999	40	+0.00%
2007	37	−0.97%
2012	35	−1.11%
2017	35	+0.00%
2023	42	+3.09%
Source: INSEE

== See also ==
- Corbières AOC
- Communes of the Aude department
