= Orbieu =

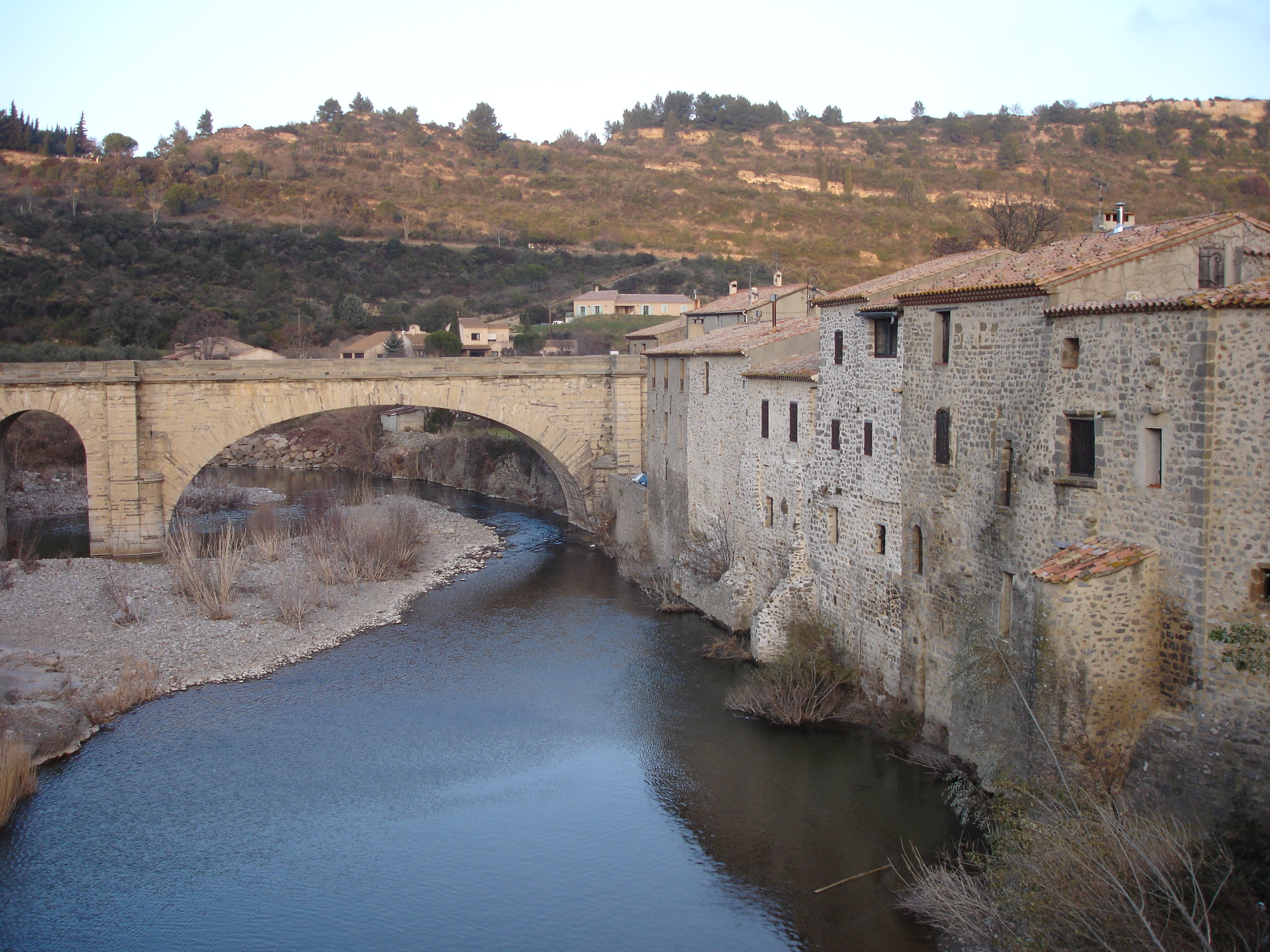
- The Orbieu at Lagrasse

- Location within France Location within Occitanie

Location
- Country: France

Physical characteristics
- Source
  - location: Fourtou
  - coordinates: 42°55′59″N 02°26′05″E
  - elevation: 700 m (2,300 ft)
- Mouth
  - location: Aude
  - coordinates: 43°13′59″N 02°54′00″E
  - elevation: 10 m (33 ft)
- Length: 84.2 km (52.3 mi)
- Basin size: 680 km^{2} (260 sq mi)
- Discharge
  - average: 4.64 m^{3}/s (164 cu ft/s)

Basin features
- Progression: Aude→ Mediterranean Sea

The Orbieu (French pronunciation: [ɔʁbjø]; Occitan: Orbiu) is an 84.2-kilometre (52.3 mi) long river in the Aude département, in south central France. Its source is at Fourtou, in the Corbières Massif. It flows generally northeast. It is a right tributary of the Aude into which it flows between Raissac-d'Aude and Marcorignan, 10 kilometres (6 mi) northwest of Narbonne.

== Communes along its course ==
This list is ordered from source to mouth: Fourtou, Auriac, Lanet, Montjoi, Vignevieille, Mayronnes, Saint-Martin-des-Puits, Saint-Pierre-des-Champs, Lagrasse, Ribaute, Camplong-d'Aude, Fabrezan, Ferrals-les-Corbières, Lézignan-Corbières, Luc-sur-Orbieu, Cruscades, Ornaisons, Névian, Villedaigne, Raissac-d'Aude, and Marcorignan.
