= Villedaigne =

Commune in Occitanie, France

- Commune
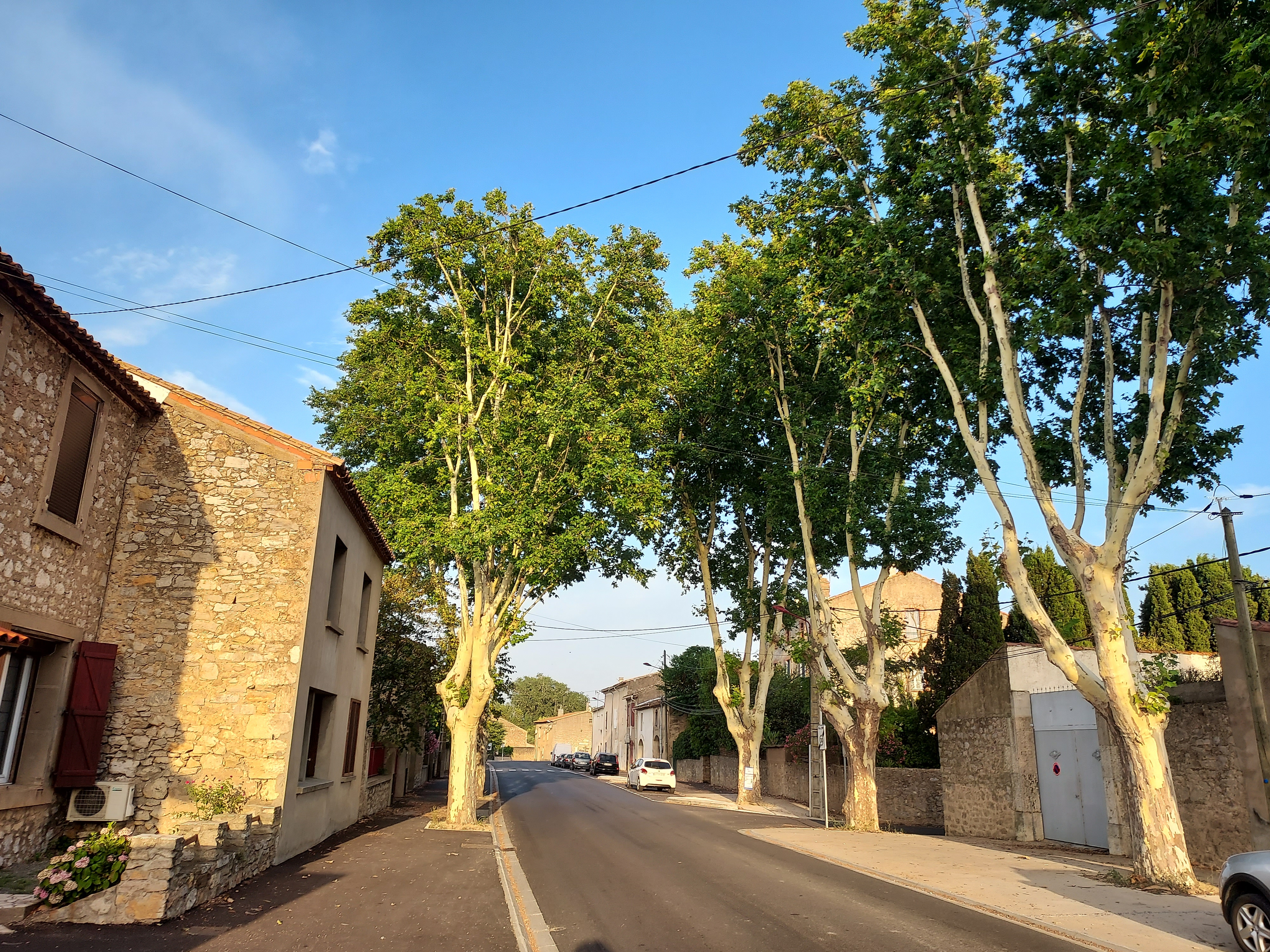

- Coat of arms
- Location of Villedaigne
- Location within France Location within Occitanie
- Coordinates: 43°12′58″N 2°51′39″E
- Country: France
- Region: Occitania
- Department: Aude
- Arrondissement: Narbonne
- Canton: Narbonne-1
- Intercommunality: Grand Narbonne

Government
  - Mayor (2023–2026): Sylvain Maillard
- Area^{1}: 2.49 km^{2} (0.96 sq mi)
- Elevation: 25 m (82 ft)
- Highest elevation: 36 m (118 ft)
- Lowest elevation: 19 m (62 ft)
- Population (2023): 599
  - Density: 241/km^{2} (623/sq mi)
- Time zone: UTC+01:00 (CET)
  - Summer (DST): UTC+02:00 (CEST)
- INSEE/Postal code: 11421 /11200
- ^{1} French Land Register data, which excludes lakes, ponds, glaciers > 1 km^{2} (0.386 sq mi or 247 acres) and river estuaries.

Villedaigne (French pronunciation: [vildɛɲ]; Occitan: Viladanha) is a commune in the Aude department in southern France, about 15 kilometres from Narbonne.

== Population ==
Historical population
Year	Pop.	±% p.a.
1968	407	—
1975	410	+0.10%
1982	423	+0.45%
1990	467	+1.24%
1999	463	−0.10%
2007	466	+0.08%
2012	480	+0.59%
2017	510	+1.22%
2023	599	+2.72%
Source: INSEE

== Geography ==
The village lies on the left bank of the Orbieu, which forms all of the commune's eastern border.

== History ==
William of Gellone was defeated not far from Villedaigne in a battle with the Cordoban Muslim army led by Abd al-Malik ibn Abd al-Wahid ibn Mughith on his approach to Carcassonne. The expedition did not advance deeper into Carolingian territory.

== See also ==
- Communes of the Aude department
