= Argens-Minervois =

Commune in Occitanie, France

- Commune
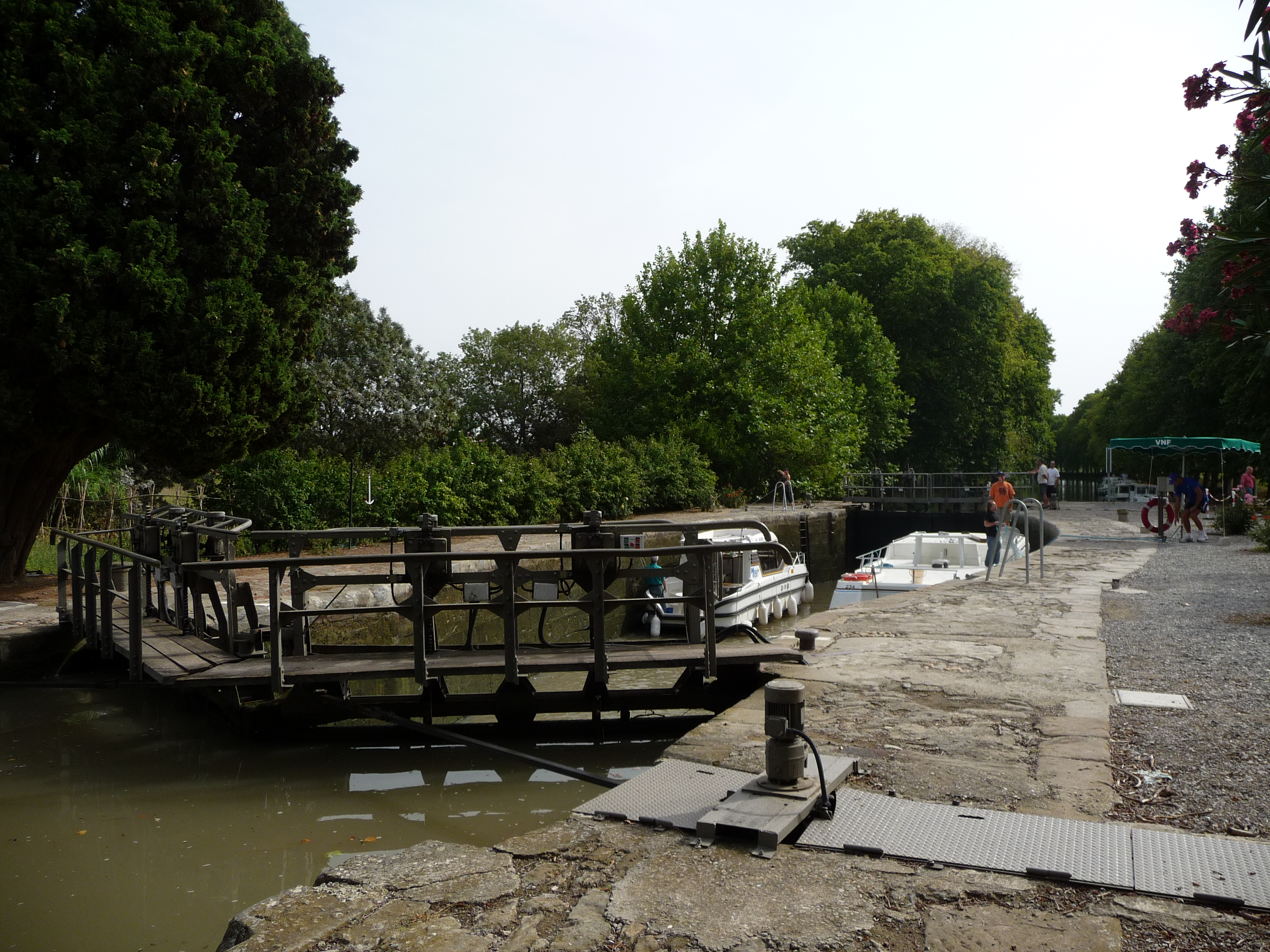
- Lock on the Canal du Midi

- Coat of arms
- Location of Argens-Minervois
- Location within France Location within Occitanie
- Coordinates: 43°14′36″N 2°45′59″E
- Country: France
- Region: Occitania
- Department: Aude
- Arrondissement: Narbonne
- Canton: Le Lézignanais
- Intercommunality: CC Région Lézignanaise Corbières Minervois

Government
  - Mayor (2026–32): Sébastien Filippi
- Area^{1}: 4.59 km^{2} (1.77 sq mi)
- Elevation: 39 m (128 ft)
- Highest elevation: 120 m (390 ft)
- Lowest elevation: 27 m (89 ft)
- Population (2023): 395
  - Density: 86.1/km^{2} (223/sq mi)
- Time zone: UTC+01:00 (CET)
  - Summer (DST): UTC+02:00 (CEST)
- INSEE/Postal code: 11013 /11200
- ^{1} French Land Register data, which excludes lakes, ponds, glaciers > 1 km^{2} (0.386 sq mi or 247 acres) and river estuaries.

Argens-Minervois is a commune in the Aude department in the Occitanie region of southern France.

== Geography ==
Argens-Minervois is located some 20 km west by south-west of Capestang and 6 km north of Lézignan-Corbières. The northern border of the commune is also the border between Aude and Hérault. Access to the commune is by the D124 road from Roubia in the east which passes through the village and continues along the bank of the Canal du Midi to join the D11 north-east of the commune. The commune is forested in the north with a large reservoir in the centre feeding the Canal du-Midi. The rest of the commune is farmland.

The Aude river forms the whole southern and western border of the commune with the Canal du Midi parallel to it in the commune on the left bank in the commune. The large reservoir in the centre of the commune feeds the Canal through the Ruisseau de l'Étang on the eastern side and an unnamed stream on the western side. The Ruisseau du Four rises in the north-east of the commune and flows under the Canal to the Aude.

== History ==
=== Heraldry ===
Arms of Argens-Minervois	Blazon: Vairy, in fesse fusilly, all in Argent and Azure.

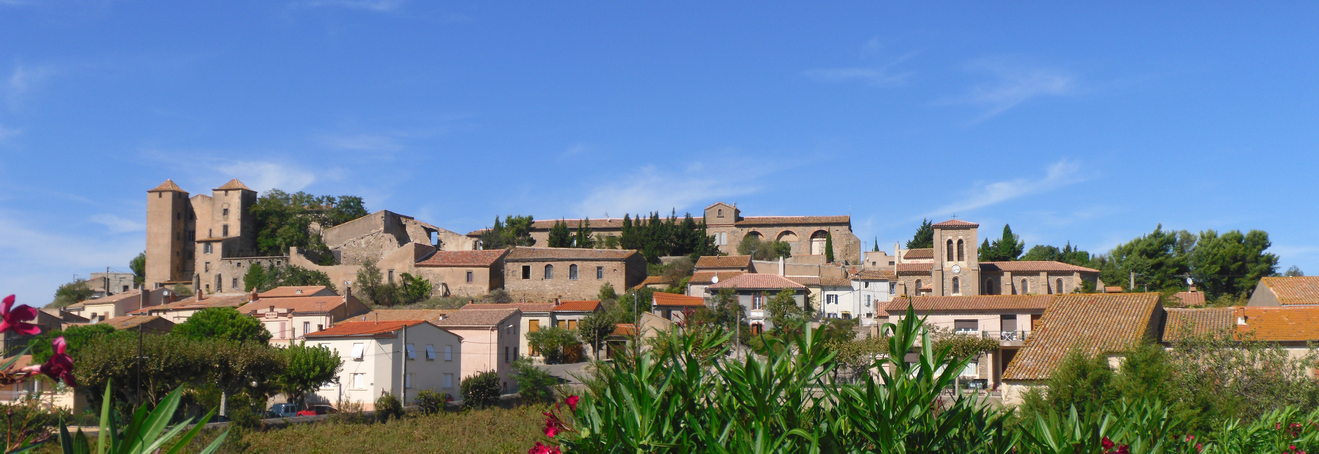
Argens-Minervois panorama

== Administration ==
List of Successive Mayors

From	To	Name
2001	2008	Pierre Peyrard
2008	2016	René Lazes
2016	2026	Gérard Garcia
2026	-	Sébastien Filippi

== Demography ==
The inhabitants of the commune are known as Argenais or Argenaises in French.

Historical population

Year	Pop.	±% p.a.
1793	106	—
1821	197	+2.24%
1846	221	+0.46%
1872	201	−0.36%
1901	292	+1.30%
1926	262	−0.43%
1946	199	−1.37%
1962	210	+0.34%
1968	232	+1.67%

Year	Pop.	±% p.a.
1975	210	−1.41%
1982	218	+0.54%
1990	293	+3.77%
1999	330	+1.33%
2007	374	+1.58%
2012	371	−0.16%
2017	347	−1.33%
2023	395	+2.18%

Source: EHESS and INSEE

== Economy ==
Viticulture: Minervois (AOC), Languedoc (AOC)

== Sites and monuments ==
- Argens Locks
- A Château from the 14th century
- A Medieval Village
- The Church of Saint-Vincent contains two items that are registered as historical objects:
  - A Bronze Ball (1607)
  - A Baptismal font

== See also ==
- Communes of the Aude department
