= Canton of Narbonne-1 =

Coordinates: 43.19°N 2.99°E

- Canton
- Situation of the canton of Narbonne-1 in the department of Aude
- Country: France
- Region: Occitania
- Department: Aude
- No. of communes: {{{nbcomm}}}
- Population (2023): 27,568
- INSEE code: 1111

The canton of Narbonne-1 is an administrative division of the Aude department, southern France. It was created at the French canton reorganisation which came into effect in March 2015. Its seat is in Narbonne.

It consists of the following communes:

1. Bizanet
2. Montredon-des-Corbières
3. Narbonne (partly)
4. Névian
5. Villedaigne
