= Canton of Le Lézignanais =

Coordinates: 43.20°N 2.76°E

- Canton
- Situation of the canton of Le Lézignanais in the department of Aude
- Country: France
- Region: Occitania
- Department: Aude
- No. of communes: {{{nbcomm}}}
- Population (2023): 16,244
- INSEE code: 1108

The canton of Le Lézignanais (before 2015: canton of Lézignan-Corbières) is an administrative division of the Aude department, southern France. Its borders were modified at the French canton reorganisation which came into effect in March 2015. Its seat is in Lézignan-Corbières.

It consists of the following communes:

1. Argens-Minervois
2. Castelnau-d'Aude
3. Conilhac-Corbières
4. Cruscades
5. Escales
6. Homps
7. Lézignan-Corbières
8. Montbrun-des-Corbières
9. Ornaisons
10. Tourouzelle
