= Saint-Pierre-des-Champs =

Commune in Occitanie, France

- Commune
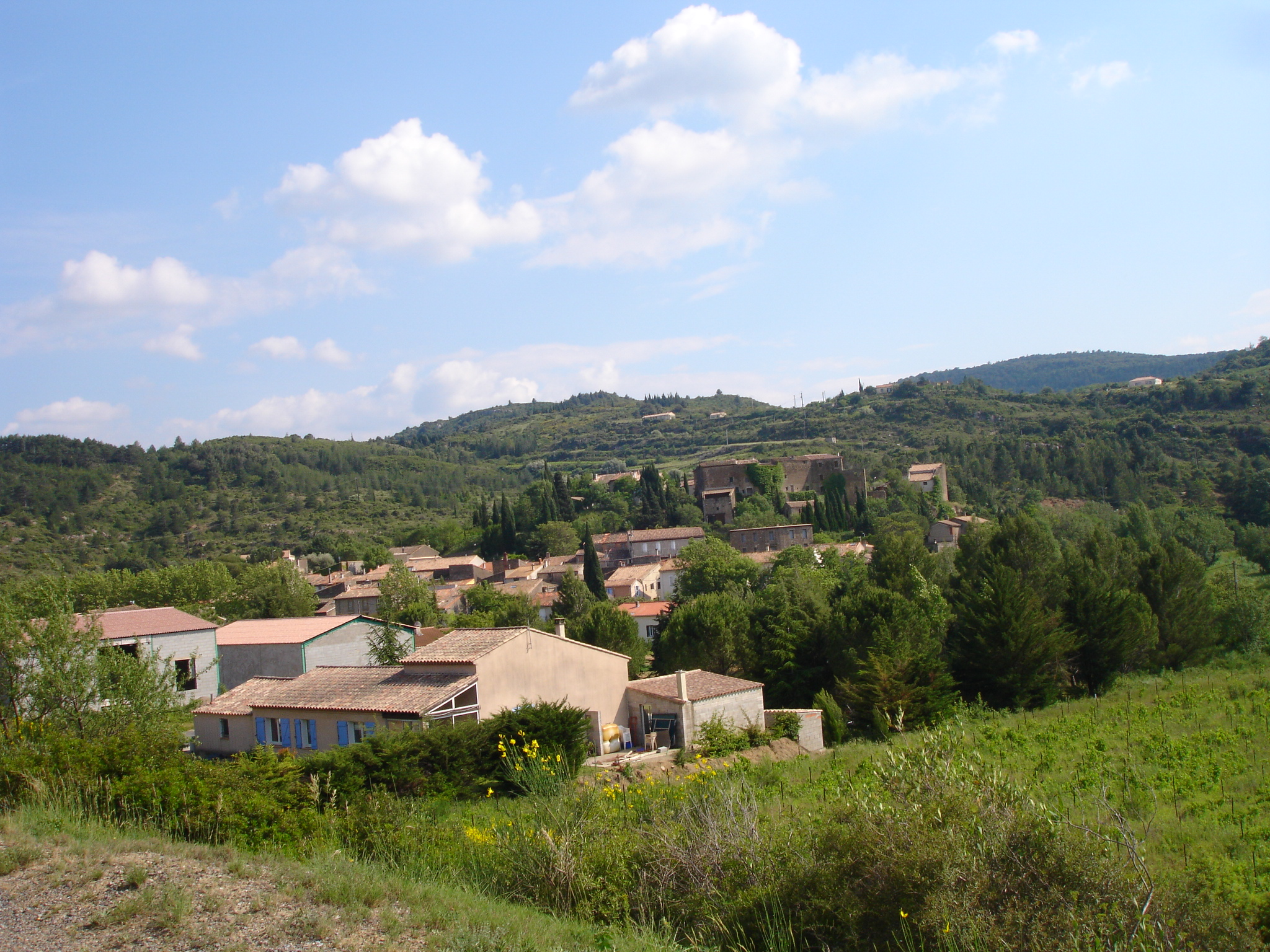
- A general view of Saint-Pierre-des-Champs

- Coat of arms
- Location of Saint-Pierre-des-Champs
- Location within France Location within Occitanie
- Coordinates: 43°03′34″N 2°36′20″E
- Country: France
- Region: Occitania
- Department: Aude
- Arrondissement: Narbonne
- Canton: Les Corbières
- Intercommunality: Région Lézignanaise, Corbières et Minervois

Government
  - Mayor (2020–2026): Roland Quincey
- Area^{1}: 15.89 km^{2} (6.14 sq mi)
- Elevation: 146 m (479 ft)
- Highest elevation: 520 m (1,710 ft)
- Lowest elevation: 133 m (436 ft)
- Population (2023): 213
  - Density: 13.4/km^{2} (34.7/sq mi)
- Demonym: Saint-Pierrois
- Time zone: UTC+01:00 (CET)
  - Summer (DST): UTC+02:00 (CEST)
- INSEE/Postal code: 11363 /11220
- ^{1} French Land Register data, which excludes lakes, ponds, glaciers > 1 km^{2} (0.386 sq mi or 247 acres) and river estuaries.

Saint-Pierre-des-Champs (French pronunciation: [sɛ̃ pjɛʁ de ʃɑ̃]; Languedocien: Sant Pèire dels Camps) is a commune in the Aude department in southern France.

== Population ==
Historical population
| Year | Pop. | ±% p.a. |
|---|---|---|
| 1968 | 155 | — |
| 1975 | 152 | −0.28% |
| 1982 | 121 | −3.21% |
| 1990 | 134 | +1.28% |
| 1999 | 127 | −0.59% |
| 2007 | 158 | +2.77% |
| 2012 | 176 | +2.18% |
| 2017 | 181 | +0.56% |
| 2023 | 213 | +2.75% |
Source: INSEE

== Geography ==
The commune is located in the Corbières Massif.

The village lies on the right bank of the Orbieu, which flows northeast through the western part of the commune.

== See also ==
- Corbières AOC
- Communes of the Aude department
