= Luc-sur-Orbieu =

Commune in Occitanie, France

- Commune
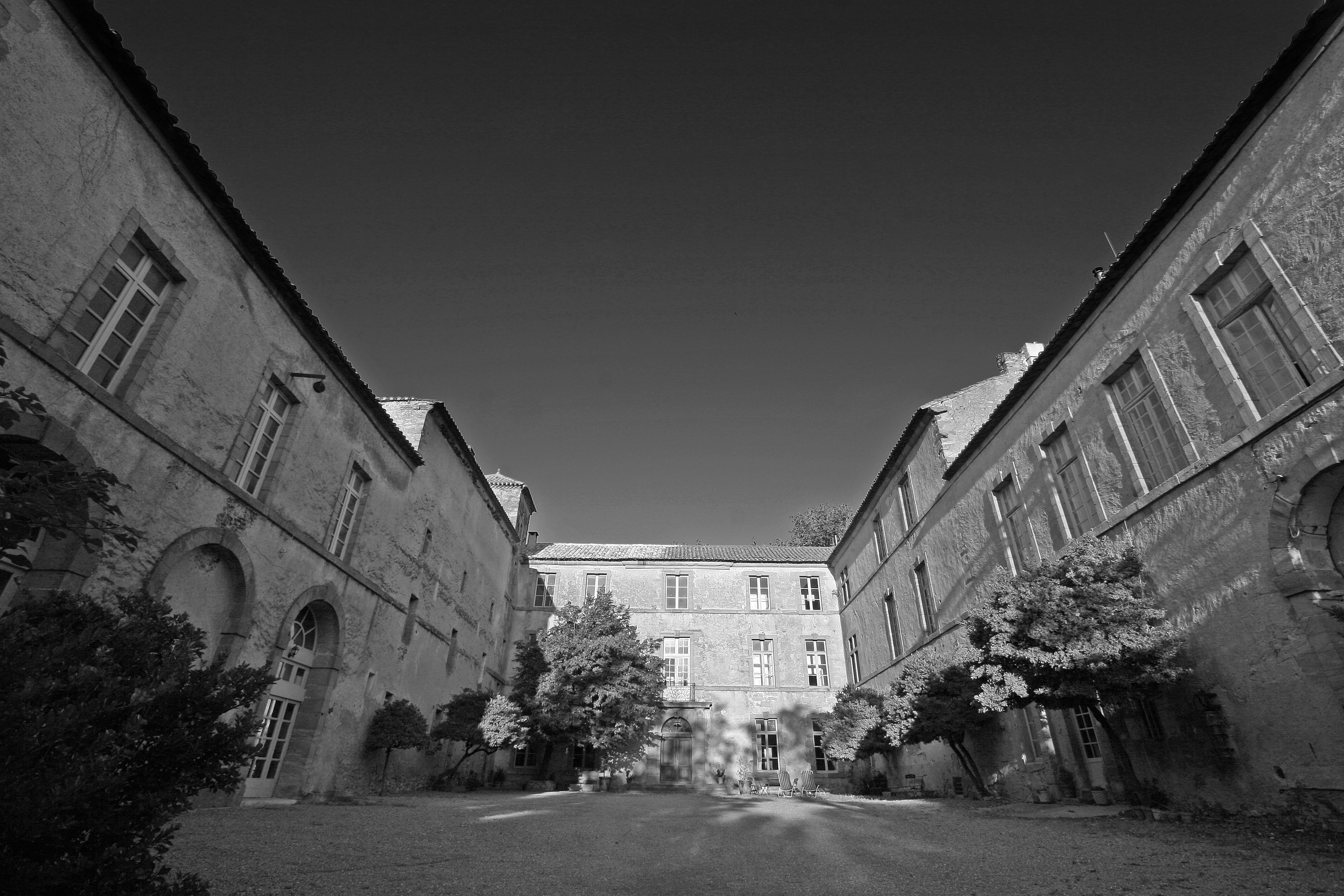
- The chateau in Luc-sur-Orbieu

- Coat of arms
- Location of Luc-sur-Orbieu
- Location within France Location within Occitanie
- Coordinates: 43°10′39″N 2°47′12″E
- Country: France
- Region: Occitania
- Department: Aude
- Arrondissement: Narbonne
- Canton: Les Corbières
- Intercommunality: Région Lézignanaise, Corbières et Minervois

Government
  - Mayor (2020–2026): Yves Kosinski
- Area^{1}: 9.88 km^{2} (3.81 sq mi)
- Elevation: 46 m (151 ft)
- Highest elevation: 150 m (490 ft)
- Lowest elevation: 29 m (95 ft)
- Population (2023): 1,173
  - Density: 119/km^{2} (307/sq mi)
- Time zone: UTC+01:00 (CET)
  - Summer (DST): UTC+02:00 (CEST)
- INSEE/Postal code: 11210 /11200
- ^{1} French Land Register data, which excludes lakes, ponds, glaciers > 1 km^{2} (0.386 sq mi or 247 acres) and river estuaries.

Luc-sur-Orbieu (French pronunciation: [lyk syʁ ɔʁbjø], literally Luc on Orbieu; Occitan: Luc d'Orbiu) is a commune in the Aude department in southern France.

== Geography ==
The village lies on the right bank of the Orbieu, which forms most of the commune's western border, then flows east through the northern part of the commune.

== Population ==
Historical population
Year	Pop.	±% p.a.
1968	728	—
1975	720	−0.16%
1982	709	−0.22%
1990	726	+0.30%
1999	786	+0.89%
2007	937	+2.22%
2012	1,107	+3.39%
2017	1,144	+0.66%
2023	1,173	+0.42%
Source: INSEE

== See also ==
- Corbières AOC
- Communes of the Aude department
