= Ornaisons =

Commune in Occitanie, France

- Commune
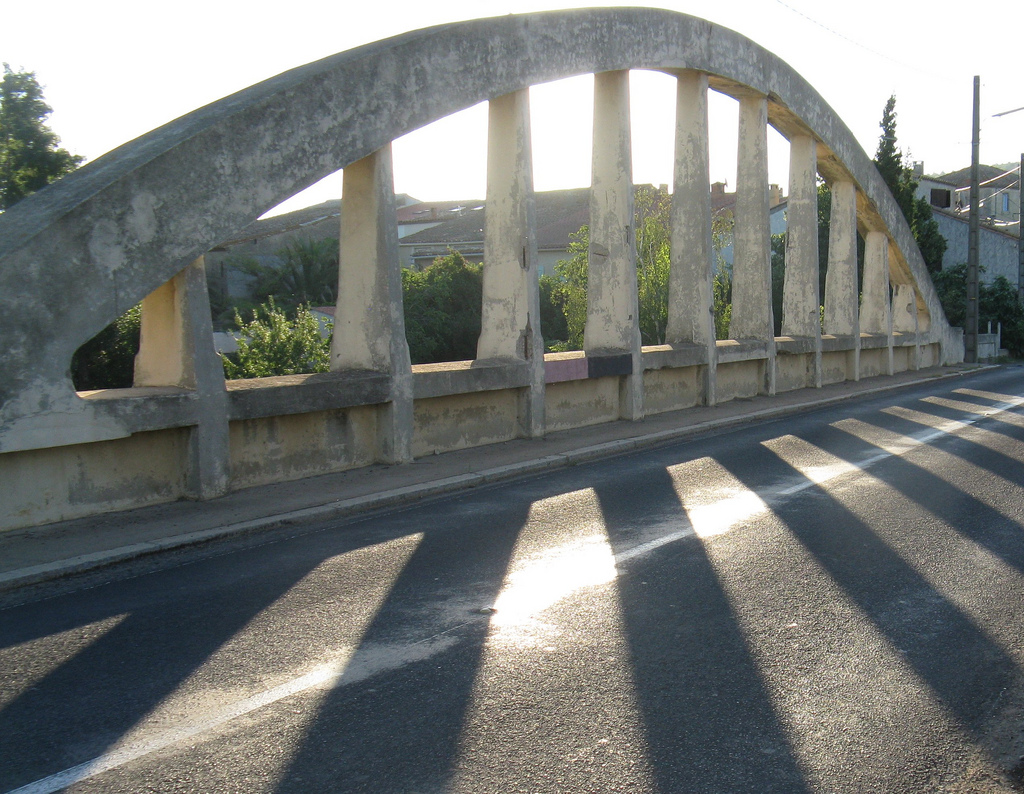
- Bridge over the Aussou

- Coat of arms
- Location of Ornaisons
- Location within France Location within Occitanie
- Coordinates: 43°10′54″N 2°50′17″E
- Country: France
- Region: Occitania
- Department: Aude
- Arrondissement: Narbonne
- Canton: Le Lézignanais
- Intercommunality: Région Lézignanaise, Corbières et Minervois

Government
  - Mayor (2020–2026): Gilles Casty
- Area^{1}: 10.8 km^{2} (4.2 sq mi)
- Elevation: 35 m (115 ft)
- Highest elevation: 163 m (535 ft)
- Lowest elevation: 27 m (89 ft)
- Population (2023): 1,161
  - Density: 108/km^{2} (278/sq mi)
- Time zone: UTC+01:00 (CET)
  - Summer (DST): UTC+02:00 (CEST)
- INSEE/Postal code: 11267 /11200
- ^{1} French Land Register data, which excludes lakes, ponds, glaciers > 1 km^{2} (0.386 sq mi or 247 acres) and river estuaries.

Ornaisons (French pronunciation: [ɔʁnɛzɔ̃]; Occitan: Ornasons) is a commune in the Aude department in southern France.

== Geography ==
The village lies mainly on the left bank of the brook of Aussou, a tributary of the Orbieu, which forms part of the commune's western border, then flows northeast through its northern part.

== Population ==
Historical population
Year	Pop.	±% p.a.
1968	929	—
1975	902	−0.42%
1982	903	+0.02%
1990	943	+0.54%
1999	951	+0.09%
2007	1,180	+2.73%
2012	1,224	+0.73%
2017	1,181	−0.71%
2023	1,161	−0.28%
Source: INSEE

== See also ==
- Corbières AOC
- Communes of the Aude department
