= Montjoi, Aude =

Commune in Occitanie, France

Montjoi
- Commune
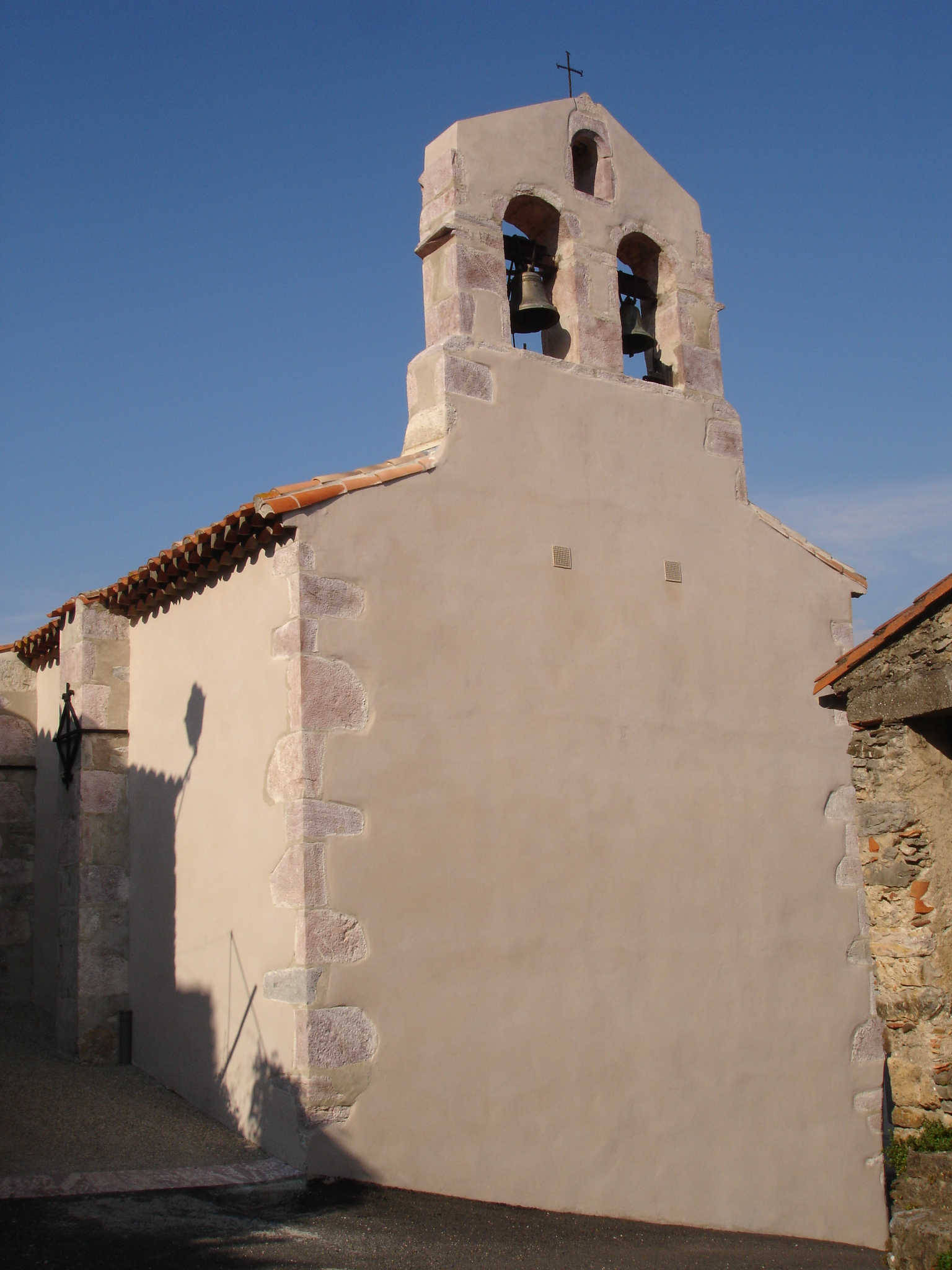
- The church in Montjoi

- Coat of arms
- Location of Montjoi
- Location within France Location within Occitanie
- Coordinates: 42°59′37″N 2°28′59″E
- Country: France
- Region: Occitania
- Department: Aude
- Arrondissement: Narbonne
- Canton: Les Corbières

Government
  - Mayor (2020–2026): Jessica Bosch
- Area^{1}: 7.18 km^{2} (2.77 sq mi)
- Elevation: 350 m (1,150 ft)
- Highest elevation: 875 m (2,871 ft)
- Lowest elevation: 249 m (817 ft)
- Population (2023): 43
  - Density: 6.0/km^{2} (16/sq mi)
- Time zone: UTC+01:00 (CET)
  - Summer (DST): UTC+02:00 (CEST)
- INSEE/Postal code: 11250 /11330
- ^{1} French Land Register data, which excludes lakes, ponds, glaciers > 1 km^{2} (0.386 sq mi or 247 acres) and river estuaries.

Montjoi (French pronunciation: [mɔ̃ʒwa]; Occitan: Montjòi) is a commune in the Aude department in southern France.

== Geography ==
The commune is located in the Corbières Massif.

The village lies in the middle of the commune, high above the left bank of the Orbieu, which flows northeast through the commune.

== Population ==
Historical population
Year	Pop.	±% p.a.
1968	45	—
1975	34	−3.93%
1982	34	+0.00%
1990	27	−2.84%
1999	28	+0.40%
2007	43	+5.51%
2012	42	−0.47%
2017	37	−2.50%
2023	43	+2.54%
Source: INSEE

== See also ==
- Communes of the Aude department
