= Saint-Martin-des-Puits =

Commune in Occitanie, France

- Commune
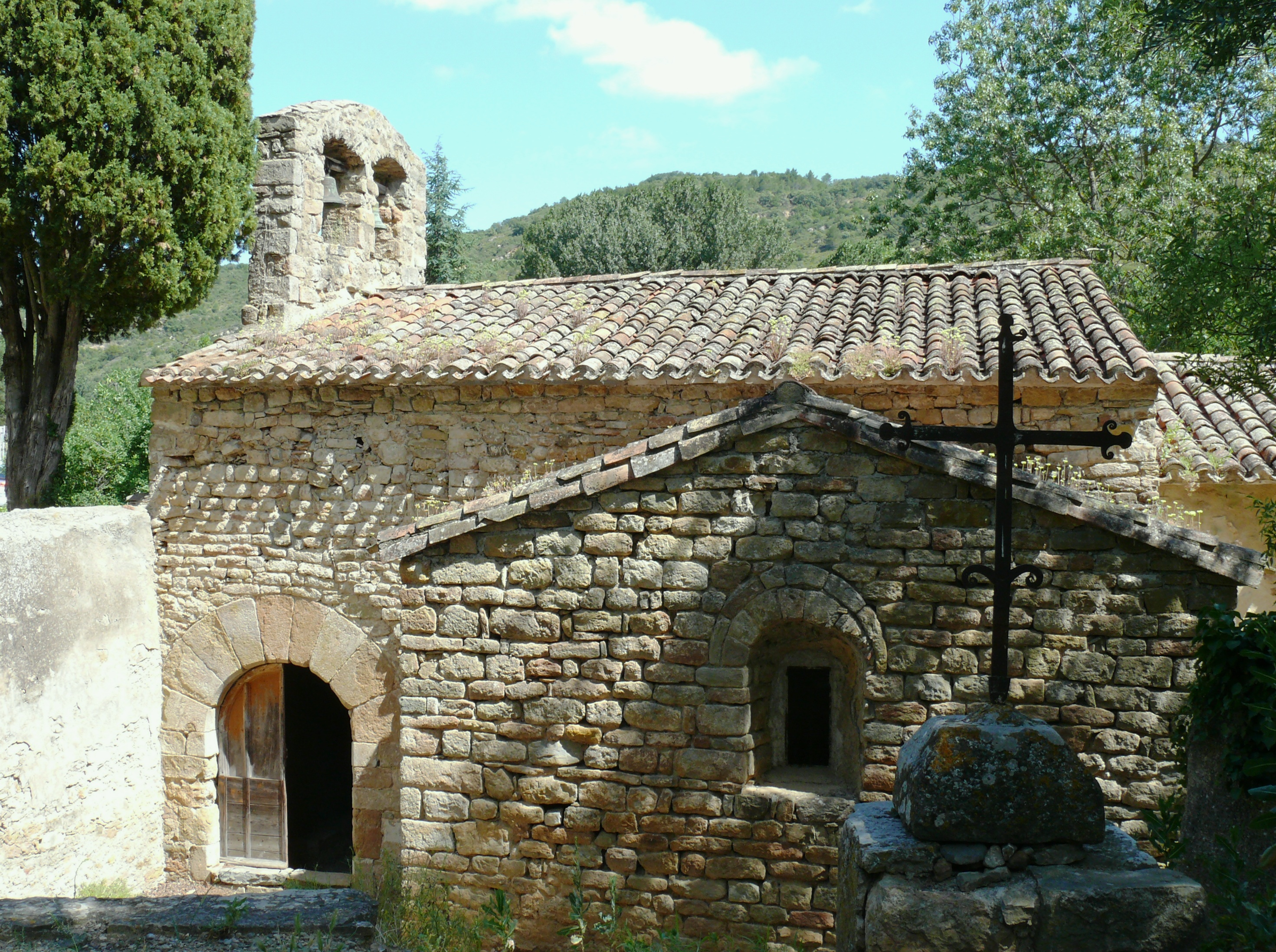
- The church in Saint-Martin-des-Puits

- Coat of arms
- Location of Saint-Martin-des-Puits
- Location within France Location within Occitanie
- Coordinates: 43°02′29″N 2°34′10″E
- Country: France
- Region: Occitania
- Department: Aude
- Arrondissement: Narbonne
- Canton: Les Corbières
- Intercommunality: Région Lézignanaise, Corbières et Minervois

Government
  - Mayor (2020–2026): Henri Riviere
- Area^{1}: 6.94 km^{2} (2.68 sq mi)
- Elevation: 210 m (690 ft)
- Highest elevation: 470 m (1,540 ft)
- Lowest elevation: 170 m (560 ft)
- Population (2023): 30
  - Density: 4.3/km^{2} (11/sq mi)
- Time zone: UTC+01:00 (CET)
  - Summer (DST): UTC+02:00 (CEST)
- INSEE/Postal code: 11354 /11220
- ^{1} French Land Register data, which excludes lakes, ponds, glaciers > 1 km^{2} (0.386 sq mi or 247 acres) and river estuaries.

Saint-Martin-des-Puits (French pronunciation: [sɛ̃ maʁtɛ̃ de pɥi]; Languedocien: Sant Martin dels Poses) is a commune in the Aude department in southern France.

== Population ==
Historical population
| Year | Pop. | ±% p.a. |
|---|---|---|
| 1968 | 147 | — |
| 1975 | 127 | −2.07% |
| 1982 | 10 | −30.45% |
| 1990 | 21 | +9.72% |
| 1999 | 13 | −5.19% |
| 2007 | 18 | +4.15% |
| 2012 | 25 | +6.79% |
| 2017 | 28 | +2.29% |
| 2023 | 30 | +1.16% |
Source: INSEE

== Geography ==
The commune is located in the Corbières Massif.

The village lies on the right bank of the Orbieu, which flows northeast through the Commune.

== See also ==
- Communes of the Aude department
