= Montbrun-des-Corbières =

Commune in Occitanie, France

- Commune
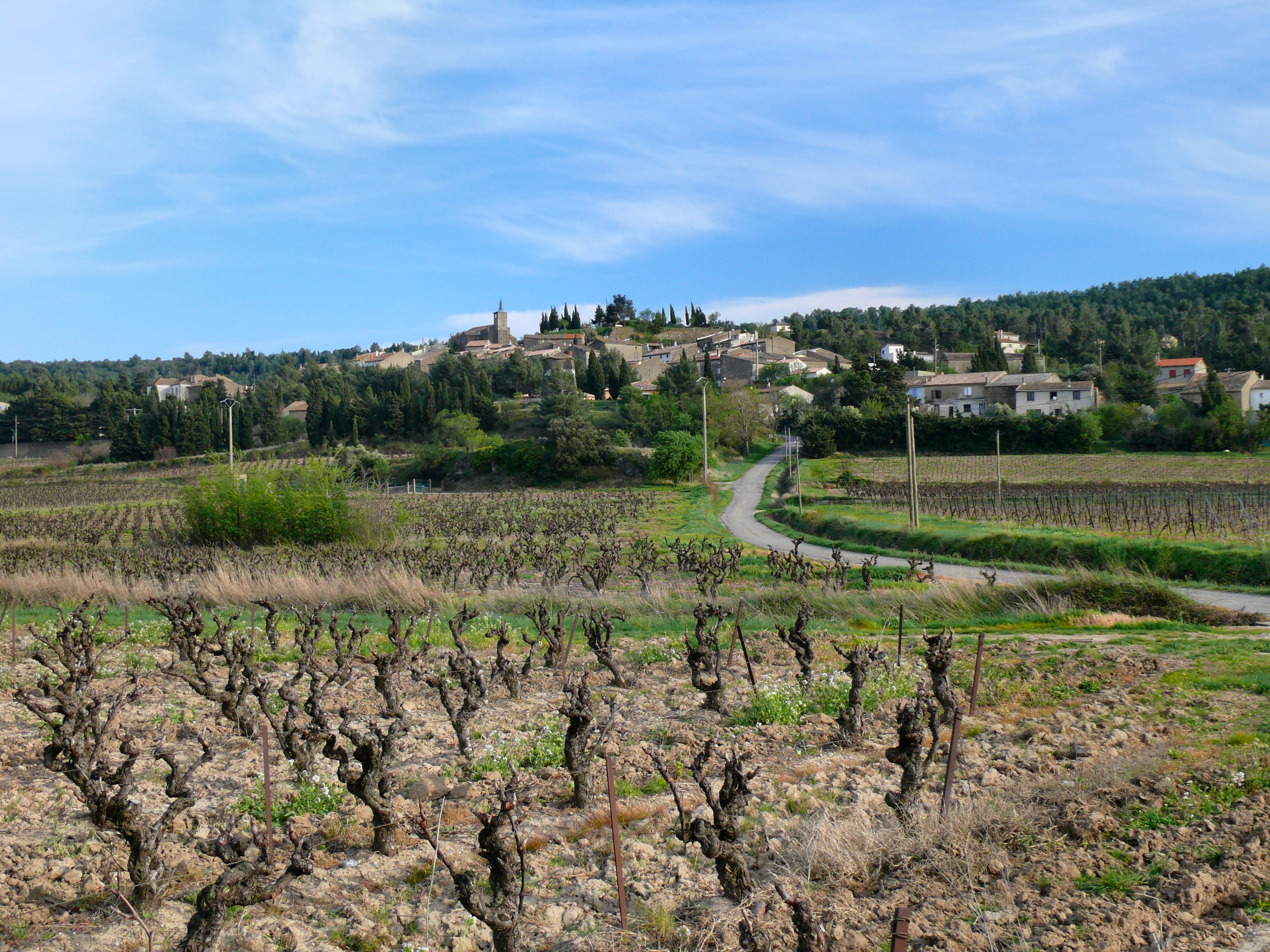
- A general view of Montbrun-des-Corbières

- Coat of arms
- Location of Montbrun-des-Corbières
- Location within France Location within Occitanie
- Coordinates: 43°11′59″N 2°41′07″E
- Country: France
- Region: Occitania
- Department: Aude
- Arrondissement: Narbonne
- Canton: Le Lézignanais
- Intercommunality: Région Lézignanaise, Corbières et Minervois

Government
  - Mayor (2020–2026): Claude Boutet
- Area^{1}: 10.61 km^{2} (4.10 sq mi)
- Elevation: 128 m (420 ft)
- Highest elevation: 206 m (676 ft)
- Lowest elevation: 68 m (223 ft)
- Population (2023): 343
  - Density: 32.3/km^{2} (83.7/sq mi)
- Time zone: UTC+01:00 (CET)
  - Summer (DST): UTC+02:00 (CEST)
- INSEE/Postal code: 11241 /11700
- ^{1} French Land Register data, which excludes lakes, ponds, glaciers > 1 km^{2} (0.386 sq mi or 247 acres) and river estuaries.

Montbrun-des-Corbières (Montbrun in Occitan) is a commune in the Aude department in southern France.

== Population ==
Historical population
Year	Pop.	±% p.a.
1968	303	—
1975	266	−1.84%
1982	258	−0.44%
1990	264	+0.29%
1999	293	+1.16%
2007	319	+1.07%
2012	322	+0.19%
2017	309	−0.82%
2023	343	+1.76%
Source: INSEE

== See also ==
- Corbières AOC
- Communes of the Aude department
