= Castelnau-d'Aude =

Commune in Occitanie, France

- Commune
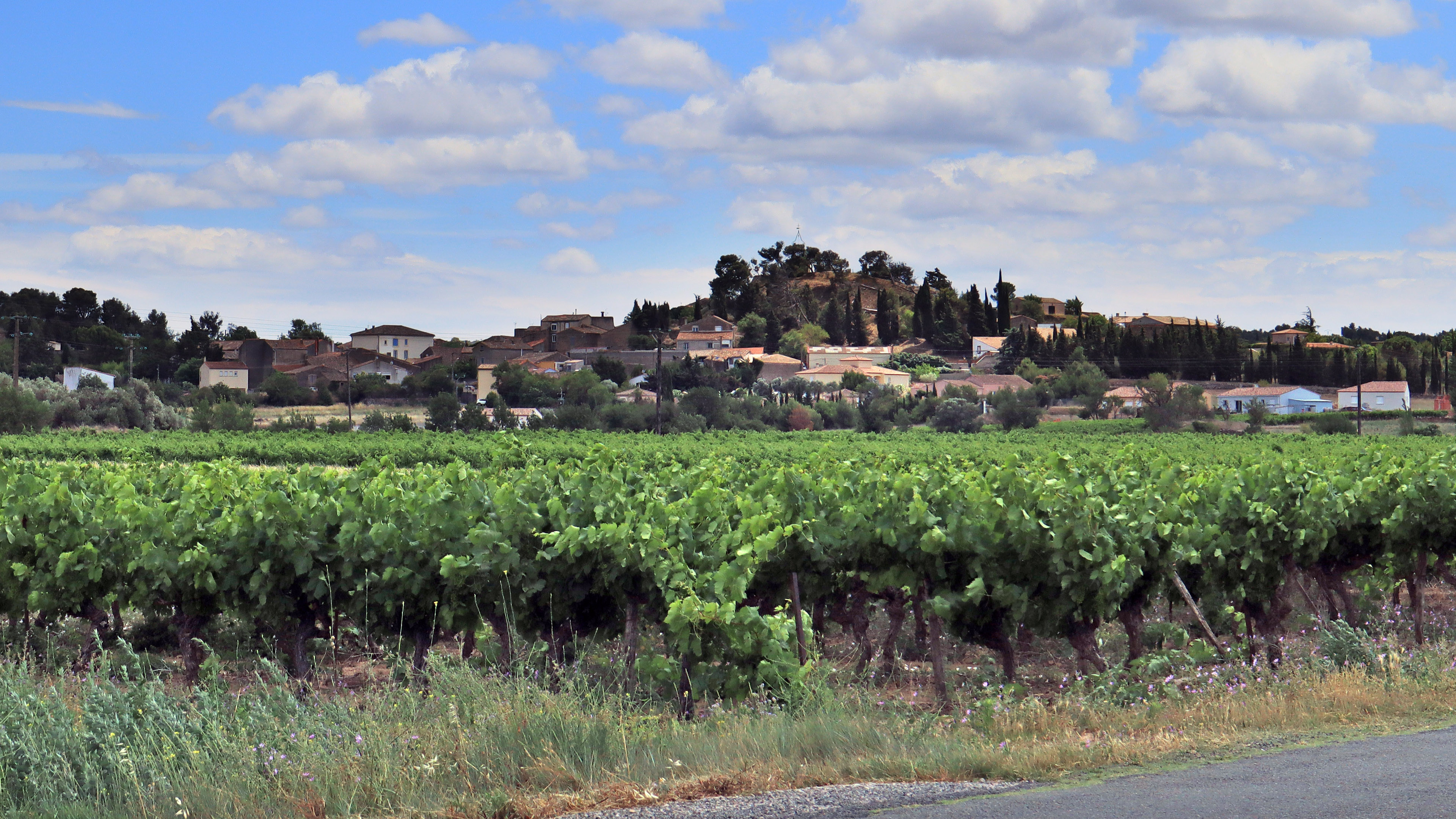

- Coat of arms
- Location of Castelnau-d'Aude
- Location within France Location within Occitanie
- Coordinates: 43°13′55″N 2°40′35″E
- Country: France
- Region: Occitania
- Department: Aude
- Arrondissement: Narbonne
- Canton: Le Lézignanais
- Intercommunality: Région Lézignanaise, Corbières et Minervois

Government
  - Mayor (2021–2026): Gilles Barthes
- Area^{1}: 7.38 km^{2} (2.85 sq mi)
- Elevation: 67 m (220 ft)
- Highest elevation: 121 m (397 ft)
- Lowest elevation: 39 m (128 ft)
- Population (2023): 497
  - Density: 67.3/km^{2} (174/sq mi)
- Time zone: UTC+01:00 (CET)
  - Summer (DST): UTC+02:00 (CEST)
- INSEE/Postal code: 11077 /11700
- ^{1} French Land Register data, which excludes lakes, ponds, glaciers > 1 km^{2} (0.386 sq mi or 247 acres) and river estuaries.

Castelnau-d'Aude (French pronunciation: [kastɛlno dod]; Occitan: Castèlnòu d'Aude) is a commune in the Aude department in southern France.

== Location ==
The village is equidistant between the cities of Carcassonne and Narbonne in the shadow of the Black Mountains and surrounded by vineyards. A rural paradise, the village remains undiscovered by many from outside the region.

== Winemaking ==
Castelnau-d'Aude has produced wine for centuries. This village is surrounded by an abundance of grape vines which glow in the golden light popular in this region of France.

Castelnau is gifted with a fine winemaking family, Roland and Anne-Marie Coustal, who make wine under the name Terres Georges. The moderate scale of production allows the entire process to be undertaken by hand. Many of the wines from this cave have won awards at the major European French wine festivals. The cave is open to the public for tasting sessions with the winemakers on Tuesday and Thursday evenings.

== Population ==
Historical population
| Year | Pop. | ±% p.a. |
|---|---|---|
| 1968 | 338 | — |
| 1975 | 315 | −1.00% |
| 1982 | 289 | −1.22% |
| 1990 | 335 | +1.86% |
| 1999 | 362 | +0.86% |
| 2007 | 439 | +2.44% |
| 2012 | 478 | +1.72% |
| 2017 | 491 | +0.54% |
| 2023 | 497 | +0.20% |
Source: INSEE

== See also ==
- Communes of the Aude department

== Images ==
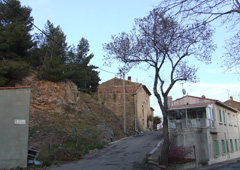

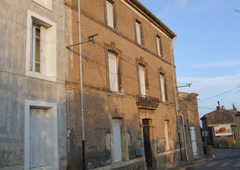

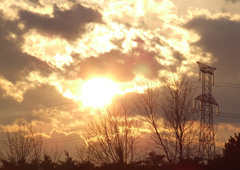
