= Névian =

Commune in Occitanie, France

- Commune
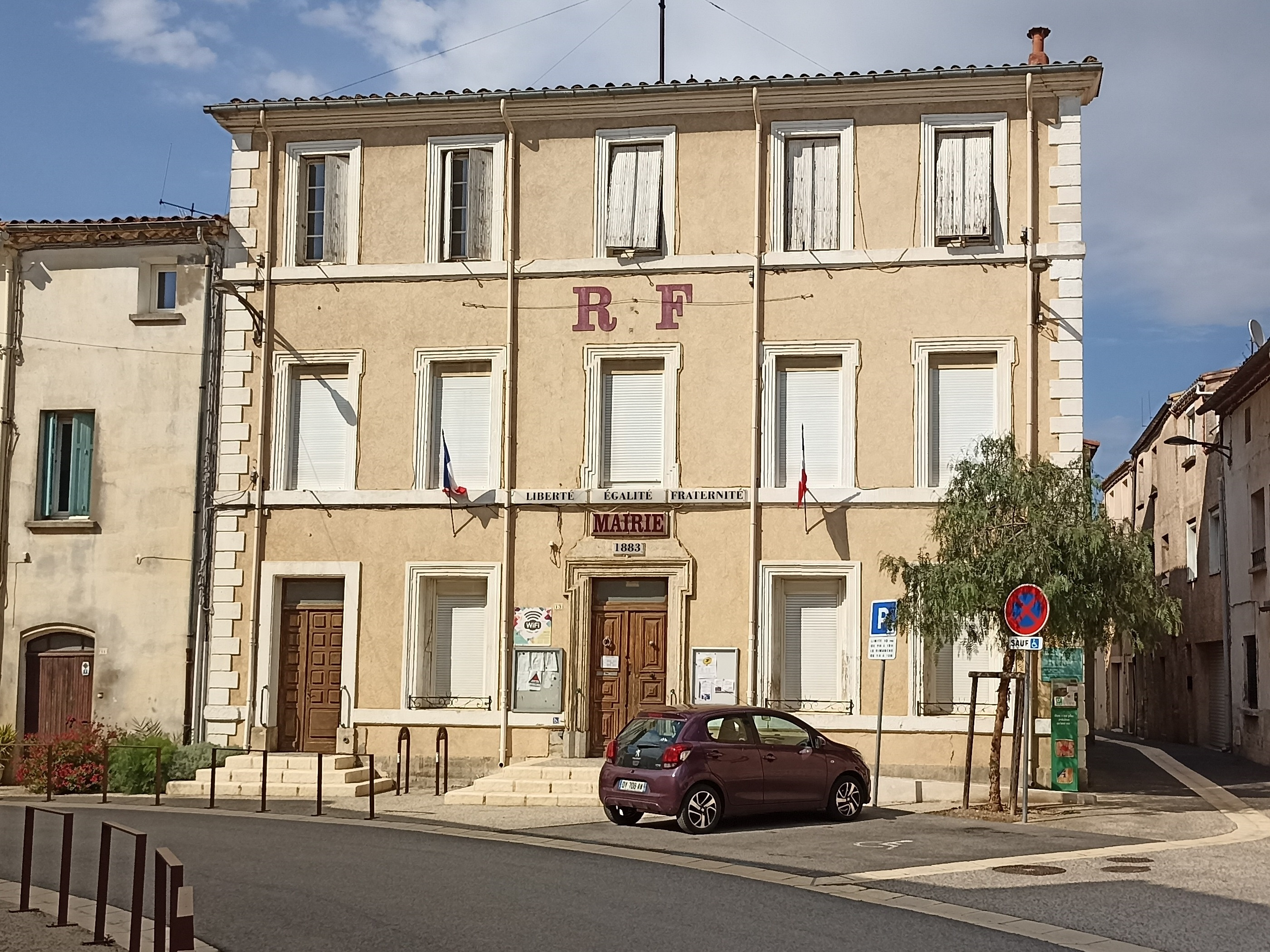
- The town hall in Névian

- Coat of arms
- Location of Névian
- Location within France Location within Occitanie
- Coordinates: 43°12′47″N 2°54′14″E
- Country: France
- Region: Occitania
- Department: Aude
- Arrondissement: Narbonne
- Canton: Narbonne-1
- Intercommunality: Grand Narbonne

Government
  - Mayor (2020–2026): Magali Vergnes
- Area^{1}: 14.25 km^{2} (5.50 sq mi)
- Elevation: 26 m (85 ft)
- Highest elevation: 175 m (574 ft)
- Lowest elevation: 17 m (56 ft)
- Population (2023): 1,286
  - Density: 90.25/km^{2} (233.7/sq mi)
- Time zone: UTC+01:00 (CET)
  - Summer (DST): UTC+02:00 (CEST)
- INSEE/Postal code: 11264 /11200
- ^{1} French Land Register data, which excludes lakes, ponds, glaciers > 1 km^{2} (0.386 sq mi or 247 acres) and river estuaries.

Névian (French pronunciation: [nevjɑ̃]) is a commune in the Aude department in southern France.

== Geography ==
The river Orbieu forms all of the commune's western border.

== Population ==
Historical population
Year	Pop.	±% p.a.
1968	689	—
1975	758	+1.37%
1982	815	+1.04%
1990	917	+1.48%
1999	1,087	+1.91%
2007	1,303	+2.29%
2012	1,276	−0.42%
2017	1,301	+0.39%
2023	1,286	−0.19%
Source: INSEE

== See also ==
- Corbières AOC
- Communes of the Aude department
