= Conilhac-Corbières =

Commune in Occitanie, France

- Commune
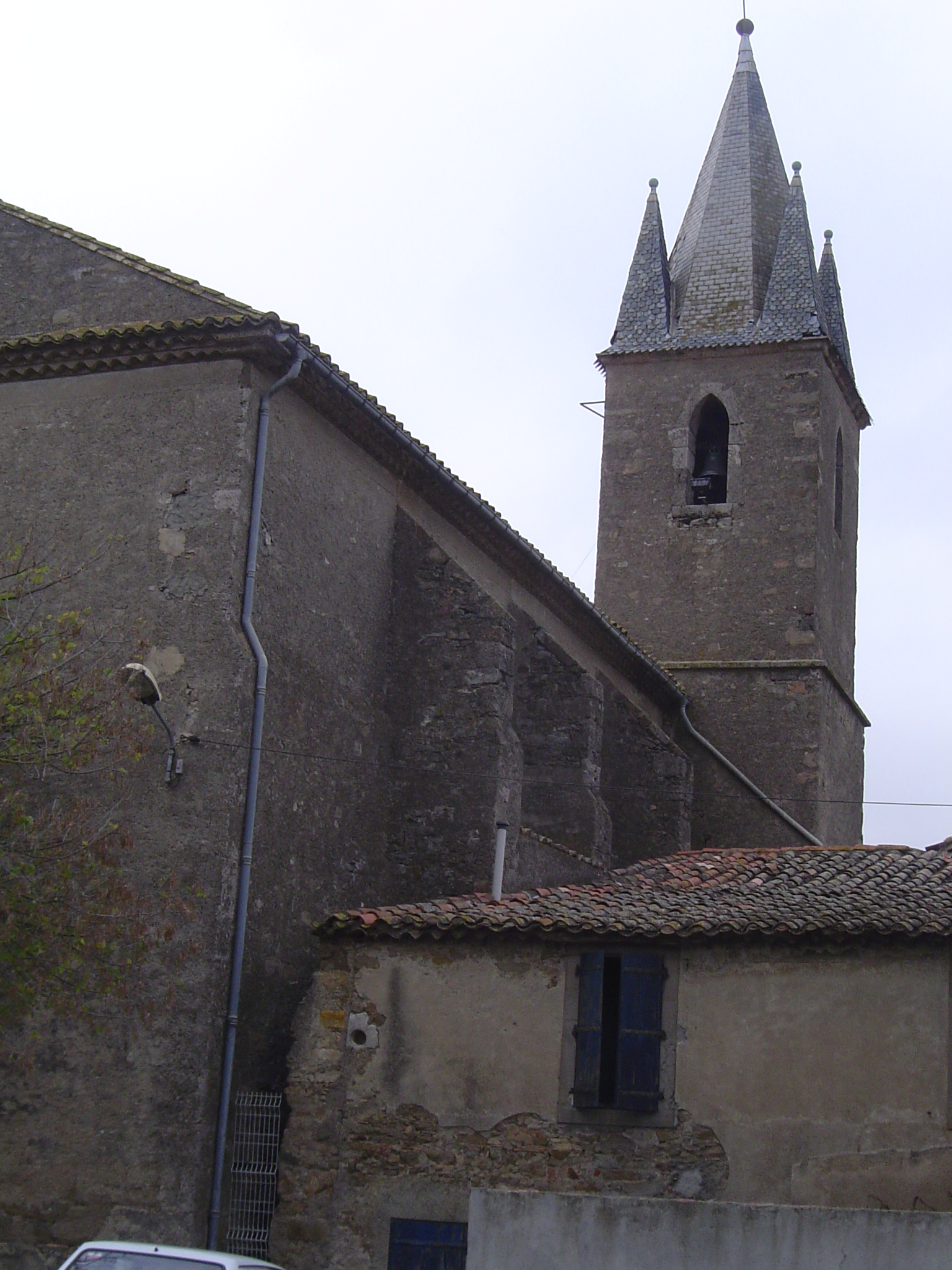
- The church in Conilhac

- Coat of arms
- Location of Conilhac-Corbières
- Location within France Location within Occitanie
- Coordinates: 43°11′22″N 2°43′00″E
- Country: France
- Region: Occitania
- Department: Aude
- Arrondissement: Narbonne
- Canton: Le Lézignanais
- Intercommunality: Région Lézignanaise, Corbières et Minervois

Government
  - Mayor (2020–2026): Serge Brunel
- Area^{1}: 12.18 km^{2} (4.70 sq mi)
- Elevation: 125 m (410 ft)
- Highest elevation: 204 m (669 ft)
- Lowest elevation: 55 m (180 ft)
- Population (2023): 954
  - Density: 78.3/km^{2} (203/sq mi)
- Time zone: UTC+01:00 (CET)
  - Summer (DST): UTC+02:00 (CEST)
- INSEE/Postal code: 11098 /11200
- ^{1} French Land Register data, which excludes lakes, ponds, glaciers > 1 km^{2} (0.386 sq mi or 247 acres) and river estuaries.

Conilhac-Corbières (French pronunciation: [kɔnijak kɔʁbjɛʁ]; Occitan: Conilhac de las Corbièras) is a commune in the Aude department in southern France.

== Population ==
Historical population
Year	Pop.	±% p.a.
1968	547	—
1975	532	−0.40%
1982	528	−0.11%
1990	582	+1.22%
1999	601	+0.36%
2007	786	+3.41%
2012	939	+3.62%
2017	917	−0.47%
2023	954	+0.66%
Source: INSEE

== See also ==
- Corbières AOC
- Communes of the Aude department
