= Cruscades =

Commune in Occitanie, France

- Commune
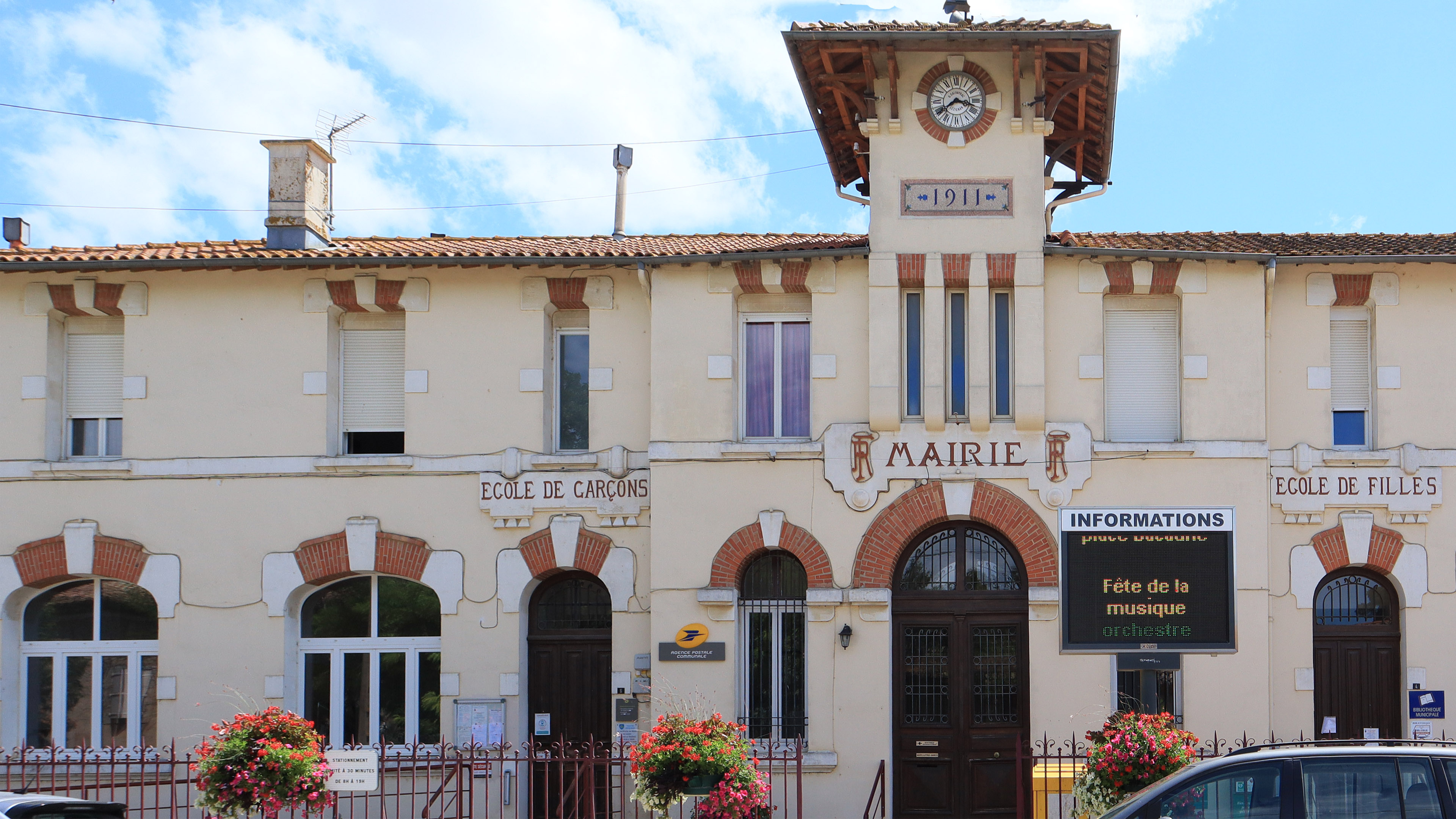
- Cruscades Town Hall

- Coat of arms
- Location of Cruscades
- Location within France Location within Occitanie
- Coordinates: 43°11′32″N 2°49′03″E
- Country: France
- Region: Occitania
- Department: Aude
- Arrondissement: Narbonne
- Canton: Le Lézignanais
- Intercommunality: Région Lézignanaise, Corbières et Minervois

Government
  - Mayor (2020–2026): Jean-Claude Morassutti
- Area^{1}: 9.65 km^{2} (3.73 sq mi)
- Elevation: 38 m (125 ft)
- Highest elevation: 50 m (160 ft)
- Lowest elevation: 26 m (85 ft)
- Population (2023): 936
  - Density: 97.0/km^{2} (251/sq mi)
- Time zone: UTC+01:00 (CET)
  - Summer (DST): UTC+02:00 (CEST)
- INSEE/Postal code: 11111 /11200
- ^{1} French Land Register data, which excludes lakes, ponds, glaciers > 1 km^{2} (0.386 sq mi or 247 acres) and river estuaries.

Cruscades (French pronunciation: [kʁyskad]; Occitan: Cruscadas) is a commune in the Aude department in southern France.

== Population ==
Historical population
Year	Pop.	±% p.a.
1968	374	—
1975	341	−1.31%
1982	290	−2.29%
1990	289	−0.04%
1999	324	+1.28%
2007	428	+3.54%
2012	667	+9.28%
2017	926	+6.78%
2023	936	+0.18%
Source: INSEE

== Geography ==
The village lies on the left bank of the Orbieu, which forms most of the commune's southern border.

== See also ==
- Corbières AOC
- Communes of the Aude department
