= Lanet =

Commune in Occitanie, France

- Commune
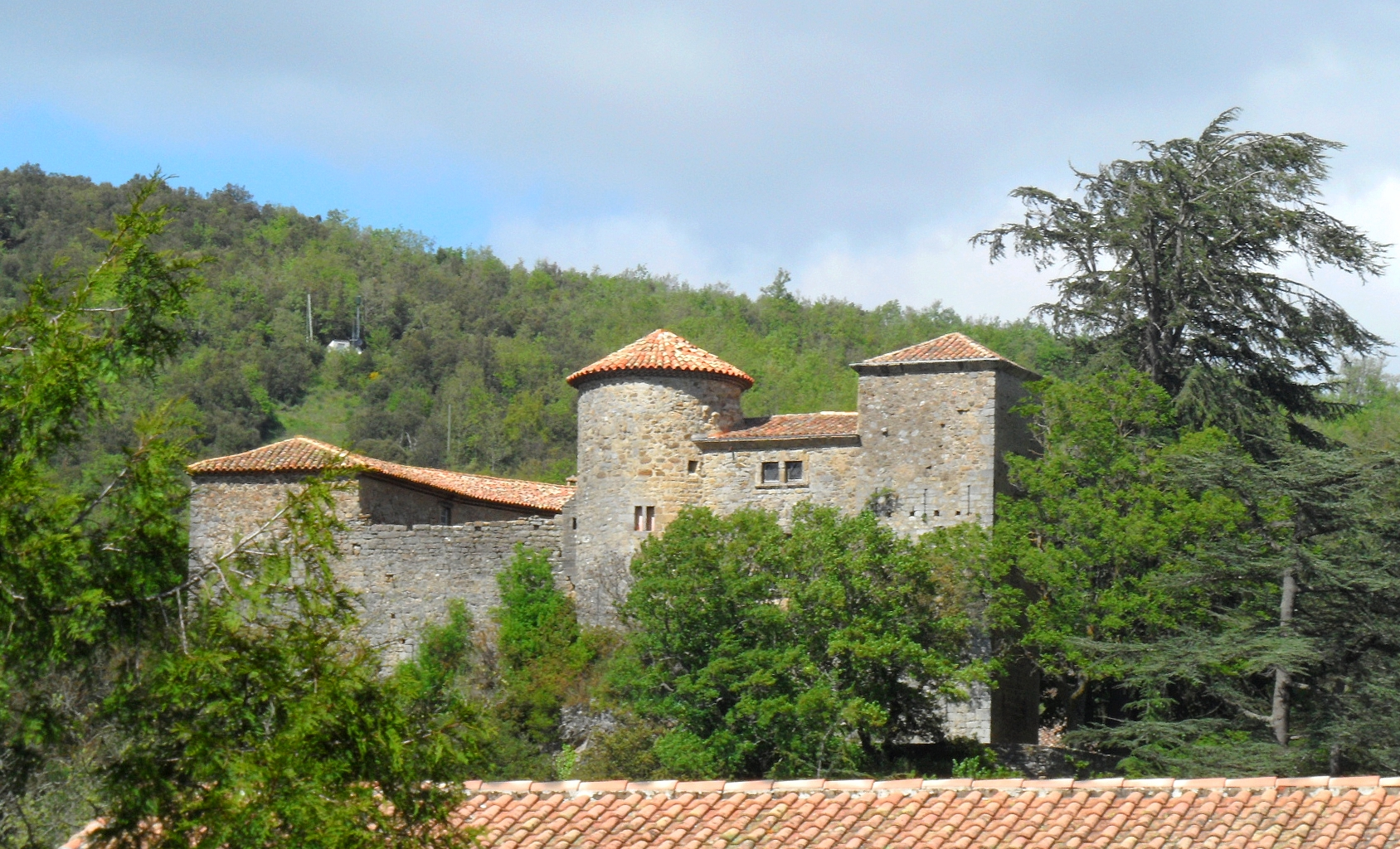
- The chateau in Lanet

- Coat of arms
- Location of Lanet
- Location within France Location within Occitanie
- Coordinates: 42°57′50″N 2°29′46″E
- Country: France
- Region: Occitania
- Department: Aude
- Arrondissement: Narbonne
- Canton: Les Corbières

Government
  - Mayor (2020–2026): Jean-Marie Galinie
- Area^{1}: 8.75 km^{2} (3.38 sq mi)
- Elevation: 350 m (1,150 ft)
- Highest elevation: 723 m (2,372 ft)
- Lowest elevation: 300 m (980 ft)
- Population (2023): 57
  - Density: 6.5/km^{2} (17/sq mi)
- Time zone: UTC+01:00 (CET)
  - Summer (DST): UTC+02:00 (CEST)
- INSEE/Postal code: 11187 /11330
- ^{1} French Land Register data, which excludes lakes, ponds, glaciers > 1 km^{2} (0.386 sq mi or 247 acres) and river estuaries.

Lanet is a commune in the Aude department in south-western France.

== Geography ==
The commune is located in the Corbières Massif.

The village lies in the middle of the commune, on the right bank of the Orbieu, which flows northwest through the commune.

== Population ==
Historical population
Year	Pop.	±% p.a.
1968	68	—
1975	47	−5.14%
1982	46	−0.31%
1990	57	+2.72%
1999	58	+0.19%
2007	44	−3.39%
2012	50	+2.59%
2017	50	+0.00%
2023	57	+2.21%
Source: INSEE

== See also ==
- Communes of the Aude department
