= Château de Gaussan =

French castle

Coordinates: 43°08′07″N 2°50′32″E

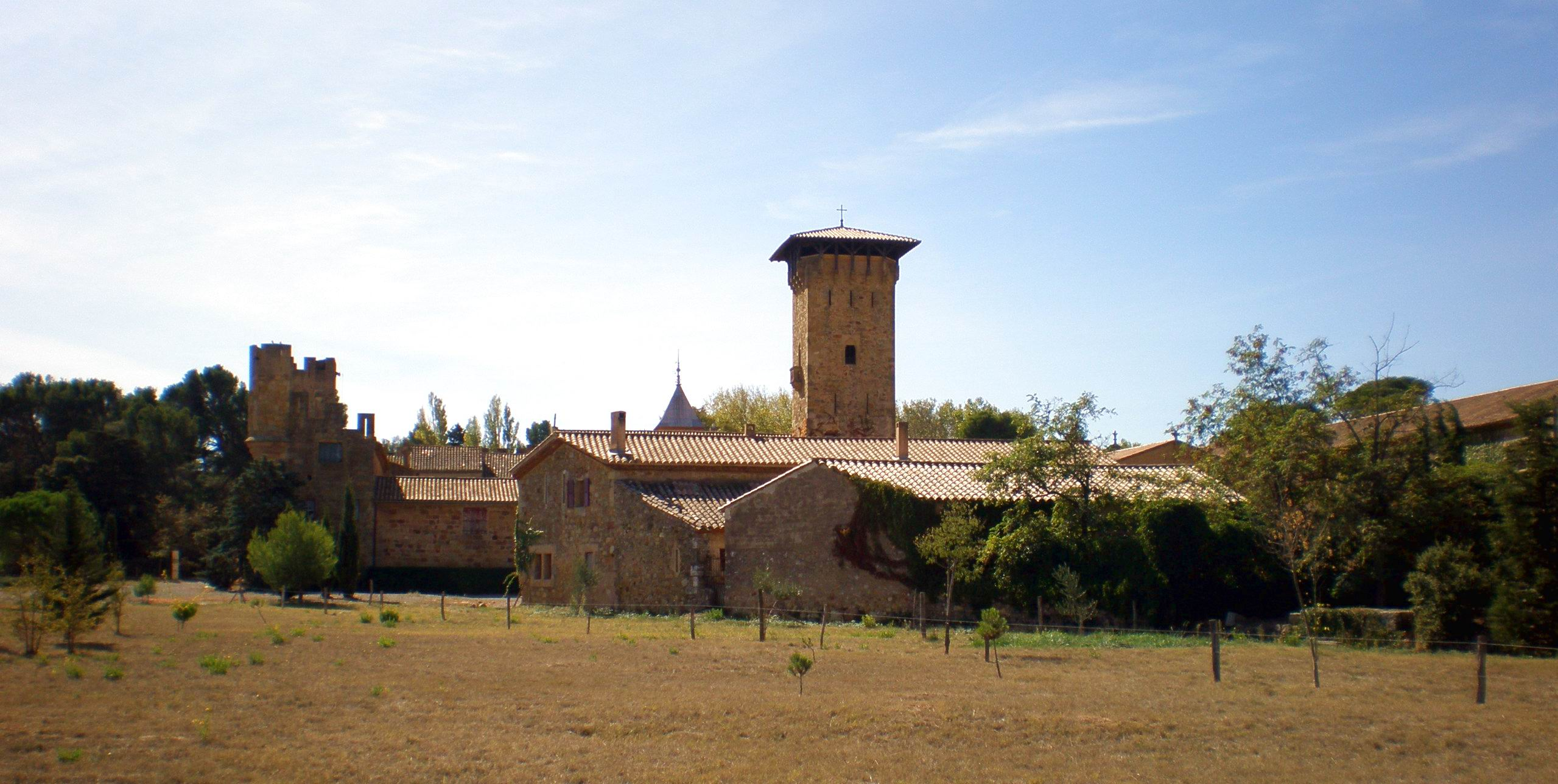
Château de Gaussan

The Château de Gaussan is a castle, much altered in the 19th century, in the commune of Bizanet in the Aude département of France.

The castle dates originally from the 14th century. It is particularly noted for the east and south façades and their corresponding roofs, the staircase, the interior decor of the library and the great hall of the corps de logis, as well as the 19th century chapel and 14th century lower hall.

The Château de Gaussan is privately owned. It has been listed since 1986 as a monument historique by the French Ministry of Culture.

== See also ==
- List of castles in France
