= Montredon-des-Corbières =

Commune in Occitanie, France

- Commune
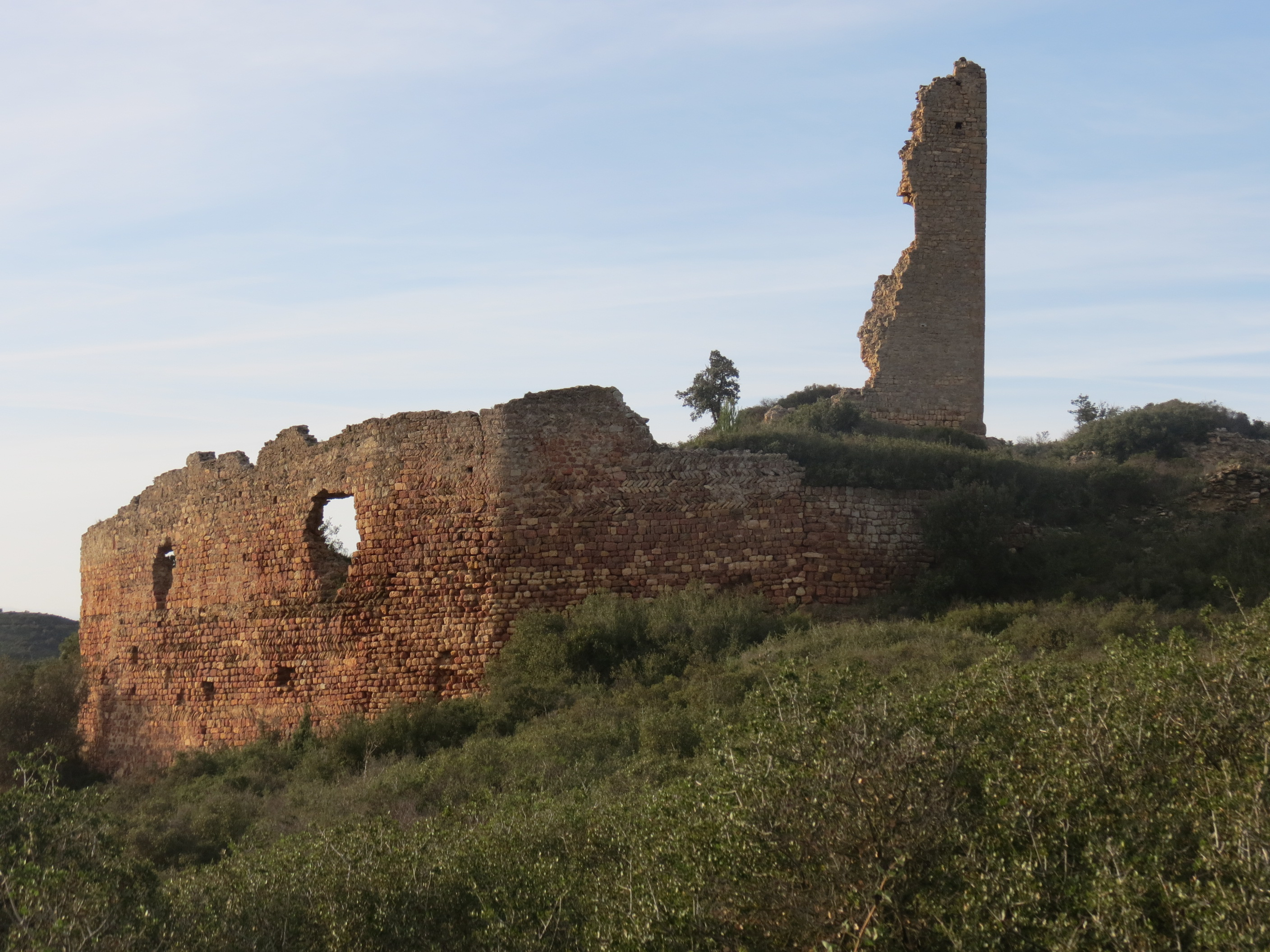
- Ruins of the chateau of Saint Pierre des Clars

- Coat of arms
- Location of Montredon-des-Corbières
- Location within France Location within Occitanie
- Coordinates: 43°11′32″N 2°55′36″E
- Country: France
- Region: Occitania
- Department: Aude
- Arrondissement: Narbonne
- Canton: Narbonne-1
- Intercommunality: Grand Narbonne

Government
  - Mayor (2020–2026): Jean-Marc Jansana
- Area^{1}: 17.15 km^{2} (6.62 sq mi)
- Elevation: 35 m (115 ft)
- Highest elevation: 176 m (577 ft)
- Lowest elevation: 28 m (92 ft)
- Population (2023): 1,485
  - Density: 86.59/km^{2} (224.3/sq mi)
- Time zone: UTC+01:00 (CET)
  - Summer (DST): UTC+02:00 (CEST)
- INSEE/Postal code: 11255 /11100
- ^{1} French Land Register data, which excludes lakes, ponds, glaciers > 1 km^{2} (0.386 sq mi or 247 acres) and river estuaries.

Montredon-des-Corbières is a commune in the Aude department in southern France.

== Population ==
Historical population
Year	Pop.	±% p.a.
1968	645	—
1975	717	+1.52%
1982	729	+0.24%
1990	850	+1.94%
1999	904	+0.69%
2007	1,015	+1.46%
2012	1,408	+6.76%
2017	1,477	+0.96%
2023	1,485	+0.09%
Source: INSEE

== See also ==
- Corbières AOC
- Communes of the Aude department
