= Fourtou =

Commune in Occitanie, France

- Commune
- Coat of arms
- Location of Fourtou
- Location within France Location within Occitanie
- Coordinates: 42°54′31″N 2°25′50″E
- Country: France
- Region: Occitania
- Department: Aude
- Arrondissement: Limoux
- Canton: La Haute-Vallée de l'Aude

Government
  - Mayor (2020–2026): Bernard Cros
- Area^{1}: 20.46 km^{2} (7.90 sq mi)
- Elevation: 670 m (2,200 ft)
- Highest elevation: 926 m (3,038 ft)
- Lowest elevation: 432 m (1,417 ft)
- Population (2023): 77
  - Density: 3.8/km^{2} (9.7/sq mi)
- Time zone: UTC+01:00 (CET)
  - Summer (DST): UTC+02:00 (CEST)
- INSEE/Postal code: 11155 /11190
- ^{1} French Land Register data, which excludes lakes, ponds, glaciers > 1 km^{2} (0.386 sq mi or 247 acres) and river estuaries.

Fourtou (French pronunciation: [fuʁtu]; Occitan: Forton) is a commune in the Aude department in southern France.

== Geography ==
The commune is located in the Corbières Massif.

The village lies in the middle of the commune, on the left bank of the Moulin brook, a tributary of the Orbieu, which has its source in the northern part of the commune.

The church in the village has been renovated and is well maintained. Its bell comes from the 12 century church located below the village in a hamlet near the "Chemin des Héritiers" within the compound of the old cemetery. This older church has been recently renovated.

The town hall has also been renovated and is regularly the seat of local celebrations.

The city's mayor Bernard Cros initiated several improvements and the construction of self-catering cottage(s).

The main activity of the village consists in livestock farming.

Outside the village, are several isolated domains hosting expatriate families: (Belgian, Dutch, German, British etc.)

== Culture & Spirituality ==
4 km S-E, nearby the old church and the site 'La Mouline', you will find the Seat of "THEG-CHOG NORBU LING", a Tibetan Kagyu monastery established by Lama Gelong Sangyay Tendzin. This religious congregation hosts a community of ten residents a mix community of ordained monastics as well as and lay people, dedicating their life to the study and practice of Buddhism.

Everyday life at THEG-CHOG NORBU LING is dedicated to the development of mindfulness through 4 hours of karma yoga, as well as 4 hours of individual and group practice of Tibetan Dharma in the Karma Kamtshang tradition. During the wintertime the members accomplish a strict two-months spiritual retreat.

== Population ==
Historical population
Year	Pop.	±% p.a.
1968	42	—
1975	42	+0.00%
1982	46	+1.31%
1990	58	+2.94%
1999	53	−1.00%
2007	53	+0.00%
2012	64	+3.84%
2017	73	+2.67%
2023	77	+0.89%
Source: INSEE

== See also ==
- Communes of the Aude department
