= Ferrals-les-Corbières =

Commune in Occitanie, France

- Commune
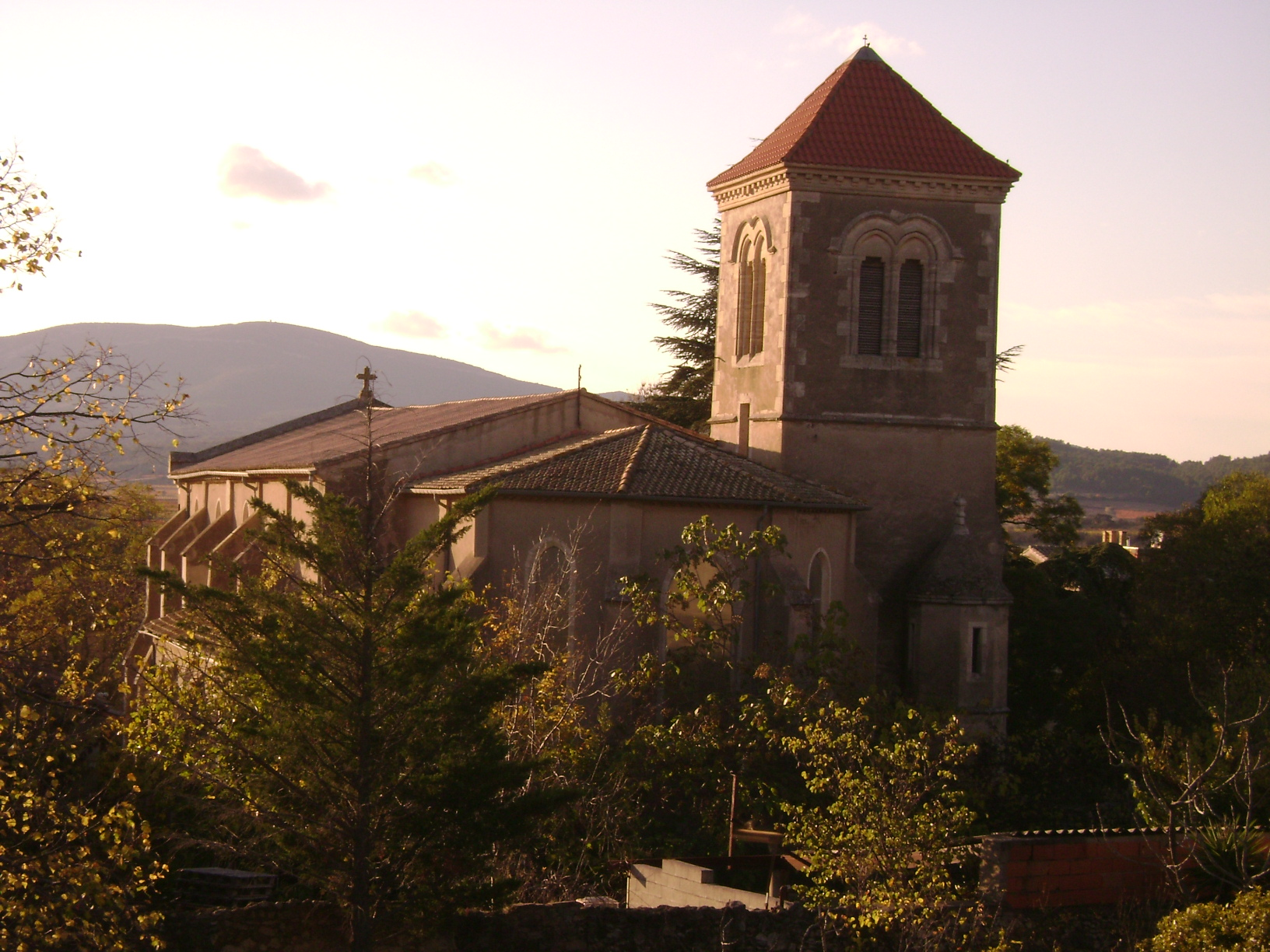
- The church in Ferrals-les-Corbières

- Coat of arms
- Location of Ferrals-les-Corbières
- Location within France Location within Occitanie
- Coordinates: 43°08′52″N 2°43′41″E
- Country: France
- Region: Occitania
- Department: Aude
- Arrondissement: Narbonne
- Canton: Les Corbières
- Intercommunality: Région Lézignanaise, Corbières et Minervois

Government
  - Mayor (2020–2026): Gérard Barthez
- Area^{1}: 15.95 km^{2} (6.16 sq mi)
- Elevation: 61 m (200 ft)
- Highest elevation: 248 m (814 ft)
- Lowest elevation: 47 m (154 ft)
- Population (2023): 1,275
  - Density: 79.94/km^{2} (207.0/sq mi)
- Time zone: UTC+01:00 (CET)
  - Summer (DST): UTC+02:00 (CEST)
- INSEE/Postal code: 11140 /11200
- ^{1} French Land Register data, which excludes lakes, ponds, glaciers > 1 km^{2} (0.386 sq mi or 247 acres) and river estuaries.

Ferrals-les-Corbières (Occitan: Ferrals los Corbièras) is a commune in the Aude department in southern France.

== Geography ==
The river Orbieu flows northeast through the western part of the commune and crosses the village.

== Population ==
Historical population
| Year | Pop. | ±% p.a. |
|---|---|---|
| 1968 | 1,080 | — |
| 1975 | 1,057 | −0.31% |
| 1982 | 972 | −1.19% |
| 1990 | 1,019 | +0.59% |
| 1999 | 1,004 | −0.16% |
| 2007 | 1,047 | +0.53% |
| 2012 | 1,174 | +2.32% |
| 2017 | 1,192 | +0.30% |
| 2023 | 1,275 | +1.13% |
Source: INSEE

== See also ==
- Corbières AOC
- Communes of the Aude department
