= Bizanet =

Commune in Occitanie, France

- Commune
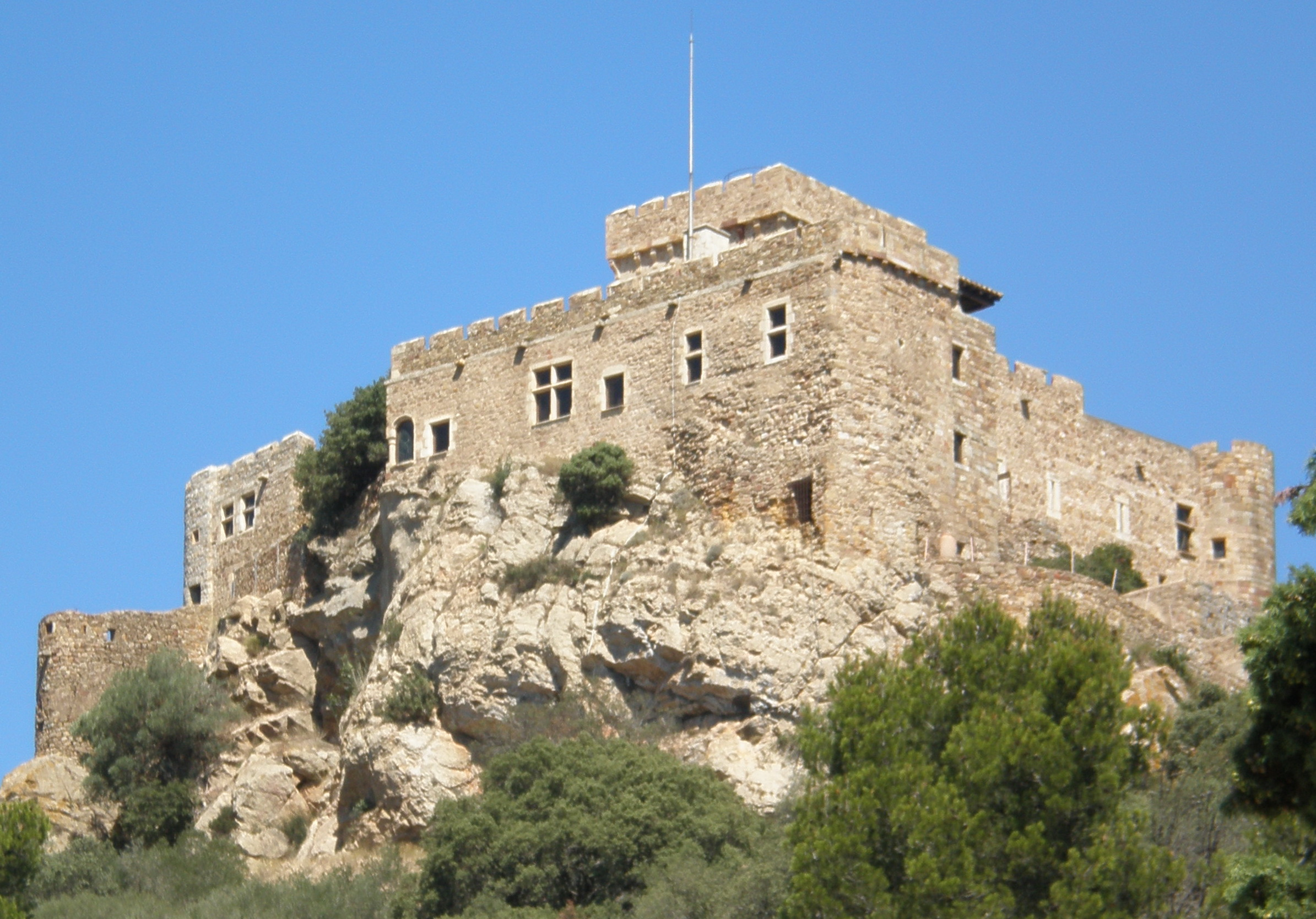
- Chateau of Saint-Martin de Toques

- Coat of arms
- Location of Bizanet
- Location within France Location within Occitanie
- Coordinates: 43°09′43″N 2°52′01″E
- Country: France
- Region: Occitania
- Department: Aude
- Arrondissement: Narbonne
- Canton: Narbonne-1
- Intercommunality: Grand Narbonne

Government
  - Mayor (2020–2026): Alain Vialade
- Area^{1}: 37.09 km^{2} (14.32 sq mi)
- Highest elevation: 260 m (850 ft)
- Lowest elevation: 30 m (98 ft)
- Population (2023): 1,730
  - Density: 46.6/km^{2} (121/sq mi)
- Time zone: UTC+01:00 (CET)
  - Summer (DST): UTC+02:00 (CEST)
- INSEE/Postal code: 11040 /11200
- ^{1} French Land Register data, which excludes lakes, ponds, glaciers > 1 km^{2} (0.386 sq mi or 247 acres) and river estuaries.

Bizanet (French pronunciation: [bizanɛ(t)]; Languedocien: Bisanet) is a commune in the Aude department in southern France. Château de Gaussan is located in the commune.

== Population ==
Historical population
| Year | Pop. | ±% p.a. |
|---|---|---|
| 1968 | 1,169 | — |
| 1975 | 1,009 | −2.08% |
| 1982 | 1,013 | +0.06% |
| 1990 | 1,039 | +0.32% |
| 1999 | 1,082 | +0.45% |
| 2007 | 1,254 | +1.86% |
| 2012 | 1,451 | +2.96% |
| 2017 | 1,685 | +3.04% |
| 2023 | 1,730 | +0.44% |
Source: INSEE

== See also ==
- Corbières AOC
- Communes of the Aude department
