= Tourouzelle =

Commune in Occitanie, France

- Commune
- Coat of arms
- Location of Tourouzelle
- Location within France Location within Occitanie
- Coordinates: 43°15′16″N 2°43′21″E
- Country: France
- Region: Occitania
- Department: Aude
- Arrondissement: Narbonne
- Canton: Le Lézignanais
- Intercommunality: Région Lézignanaise, Corbières et Minervois

Government
  - Mayor (2020–2026): Serge Marret
- Area^{1}: 14.19 km^{2} (5.48 sq mi)
- Elevation: 124 m (407 ft)
- Highest elevation: 144 m (472 ft)
- Lowest elevation: 28 m (92 ft)
- Population (2023): 494
  - Density: 34.8/km^{2} (90.2/sq mi)
- Time zone: UTC+01:00 (CET)
  - Summer (DST): UTC+02:00 (CEST)
- INSEE/Postal code: 11393 /11200
- ^{1} French Land Register data, which excludes lakes, ponds, glaciers > 1 km^{2} (0.386 sq mi or 247 acres) and river estuaries.

Tourouzelle (French pronunciation: [tuʁuzɛl]; Occitan: Torrosèla) is a commune in the Aude department in southern France.

== Population ==
Historical population
Year	Pop.	±% p.a.
1968	472	—
1975	429	−1.36%
1982	412	−0.58%
1990	396	−0.49%
1999	448	+1.38%
2007	490	+1.13%
2012	471	−0.79%
2017	469	−0.09%
2023	494	+0.87%
Source: INSEE

== See also ==
- Communes of the Aude department
