= Raissac-d'Aude =

Commune in Occitanie, France

- Commune
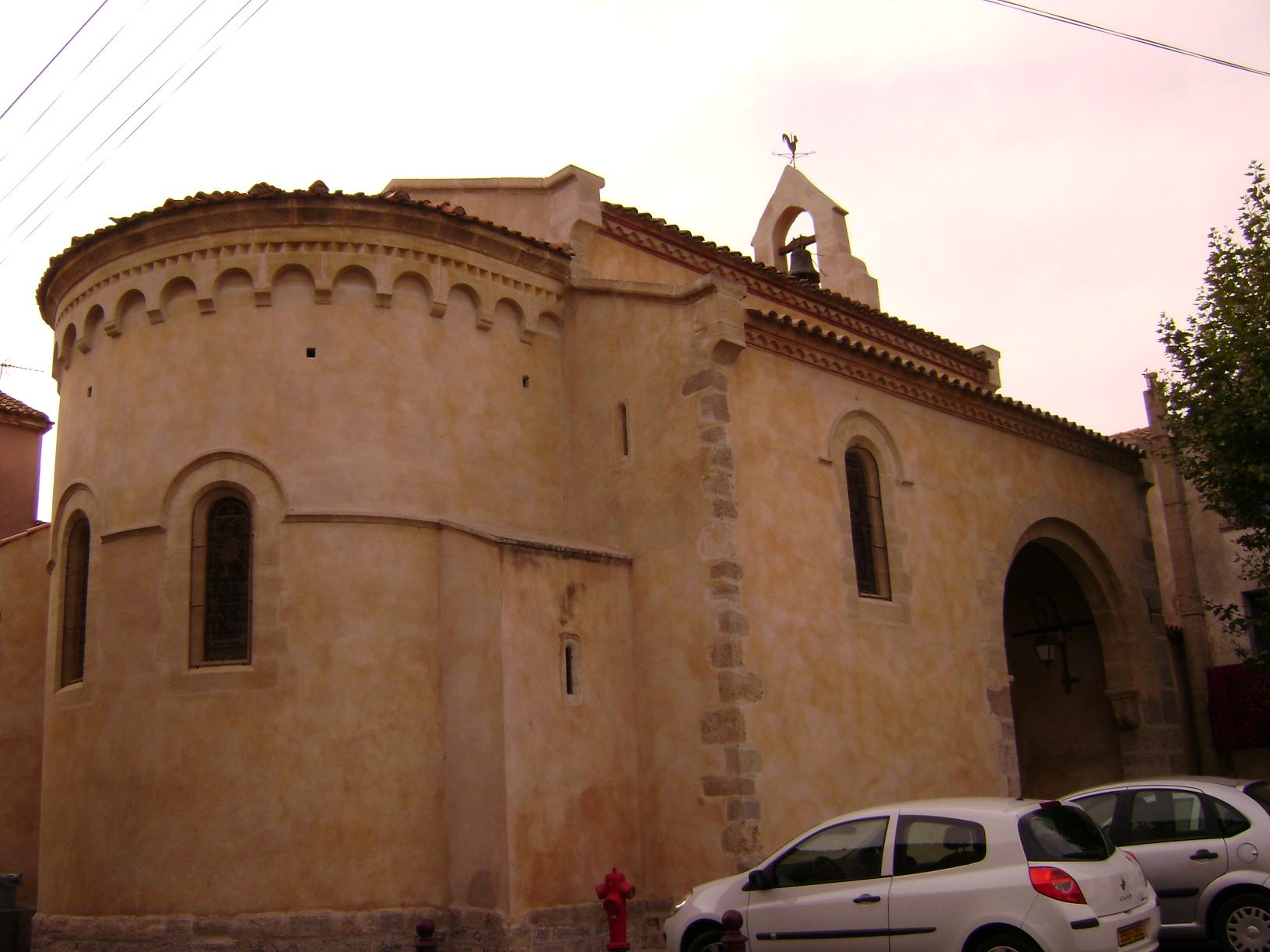
- The church in Raissac

- Coat of arms
- Location of Raissac-d'Aude
- Location within France Location within Occitanie
- Coordinates: 43°13′47″N 2°52′51″E
- Country: France
- Region: Occitania
- Department: Aude
- Arrondissement: Narbonne
- Canton: Le Sud-Minervois
- Intercommunality: Grand Narbonne

Government
  - Mayor (2020–2026): Didier Bousquet
- Area^{1}: 5.93 km^{2} (2.29 sq mi)
- Elevation: 12 m (39 ft)
- Highest elevation: 27 m (89 ft)
- Lowest elevation: 17 m (56 ft)
- Population (2023): 222
  - Density: 37.4/km^{2} (97.0/sq mi)
- Time zone: UTC+01:00 (CET)
  - Summer (DST): UTC+02:00 (CEST)
- INSEE/Postal code: 11307 /11200
- ^{1} French Land Register data, which excludes lakes, ponds, glaciers > 1 km^{2} (0.386 sq mi or 247 acres) and river estuaries.

Raissac-d'Aude (French pronunciation: [ʁɛsak dod]) is a commune in the Aude department in southern France.

== Geography ==
The river Orbieu forms all of the commune's eastern border, then flows into the Aude, which forms all of its northern border.

== Population ==
Historical population
Year	Pop.	±% p.a.
1968	301	—
1975	239	−3.24%
1982	238	−0.06%
1990	238	+0.00%
1999	238	+0.00%
2007	251	+0.67%
2012	239	−0.98%
2017	263	+1.93%
2023	222	−2.79%
Source: INSEE

== See also ==
- Communes of the Aude department
