= Argeliers =

Commune in Occitanie, France

- Commune
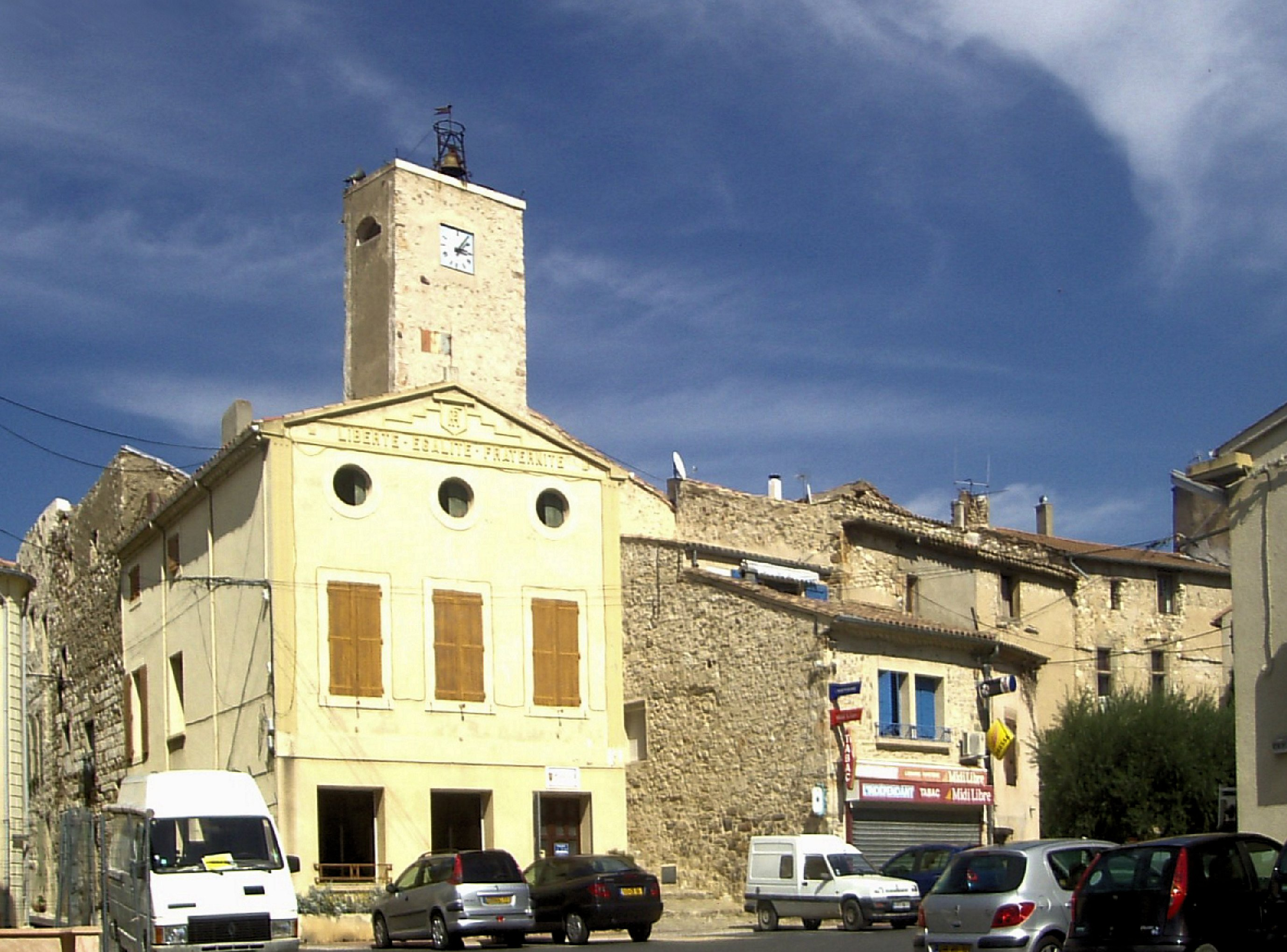
- The Town Hall Square

- Coat of arms
- Location of Argeliers
- Location within France Location within Occitanie
- Coordinates: 43°19′00″N 2°55′00″E
- Country: France
- Region: Occitania
- Department: Aude
- Arrondissement: Narbonne
- Canton: Le Sud-Minervois
- Intercommunality: Le Grand Narbonne

Government
  - Mayor (2020–2026): Gérard Leteissier
- Area^{1}: 10.79 km^{2} (4.17 sq mi)
- Highest elevation: 220 m (720 ft)
- Lowest elevation: 26 m (85 ft)
- Population (2023): 2,124
  - Density: 196.8/km^{2} (509.8/sq mi)
- Time zone: UTC+01:00 (CET)
  - Summer (DST): UTC+02:00 (CEST)
- INSEE/Postal code: 11012 /11120
- ^{1} French Land Register data, which excludes lakes, ponds, glaciers > 1 km^{2} (0.386 sq mi or 247 acres) and river estuaries.

Argeliers (French pronunciation: [aʁʒəlje]; Occitan: Argelièrs) is a commune in the Aude department in the Occitanie region of southern France.

== Geography ==
Argeliers is part of the urban area of Narbonne located on the southern edge of the Haut-Minervois and in the north of the fertile sedimentary plain of Narbonne, 22 km west by south-west of Béziers and 16 km north-west of Narbonne at the foot of the first foothills north of the plain of Narbonne. The northern border of the commune is the border between Aude and Hérault departments. Access to the commune is by the D5 road from Capestang in the east passing through the commune south of the village and continuing to Pouzols-Minervois in the west. Access to the village is by the D326 from Mirepeisset in the south intersecting the D5 and continuing to the village then north-east. The D36E48 comes from Montouliers in the north changing to the D426 at the border and continuing to join the D5 south-west of the village. The D826 also connects the village to the D5. The village residential area covers about a quarter of the commune with forests along the western border and the rest of the commune is farmland.

The Canal du Midi forms part of the eastern border of the commune passing through the commune east of the village where there are mooring facilities known as Port d'Argeliers. Other streams passing through the commune near the Canal include the Ruisseau des Gours and the Ruisseau de Roze.

=== Climate ===
Climate data for Argeliers (1991−2020 normals, extremes 1946−present)
Month	Jan	Feb	Mar	Apr	May	Jun	Jul	Aug	Sep	Oct	Nov	Dec	Year
Record high °C (°F)	24.0 (75.2)	25.0 (77.0)	30.3 (86.5)	34.2 (93.6)	37.5 (99.5)	42.5 (108.5)	41.0 (105.8)	43.4 (110.1)	39.2 (102.6)	33.6 (92.5)	27.3 (81.1)	23.2 (73.8)	43.4 (110.1)
Mean daily maximum °C (°F)	12.3 (54.1)	13.6 (56.5)	17.2 (63.0)	20.0 (68.0)	24.0 (75.2)	28.8 (83.8)	31.7 (89.1)	31.5 (88.7)	27.2 (81.0)	21.8 (71.2)	16.1 (61.0)	12.8 (55.0)	21.4 (70.5)
Daily mean °C (°F)	8.0 (46.4)	8.7 (47.7)	11.6 (52.9)	14.2 (57.6)	18.0 (64.4)	22.2 (72.0)	24.8 (76.6)	24.6 (76.3)	20.7 (69.3)	16.7 (62.1)	11.7 (53.1)	8.7 (47.7)	15.8 (60.4)
Mean daily minimum °C (°F)	3.8 (38.8)	3.7 (38.7)	6.1 (43.0)	8.4 (47.1)	12.0 (53.6)	15.6 (60.1)	17.9 (64.2)	17.6 (63.7)	14.2 (57.6)	11.6 (52.9)	7.3 (45.1)	4.5 (40.1)	10.2 (50.4)
Record low °C (°F)	−10.8 (12.6)	−14.5 (5.9)	−13.0 (8.6)	−2.0 (28.4)	1.0 (33.8)	6.1 (43.0)	8.5 (47.3)	8.4 (47.1)	3.6 (38.5)	−2.0 (28.4)	−8.9 (16.0)	−9.0 (15.8)	−14.5 (5.9)
Average precipitation mm (inches)	59.0 (2.32)	45.7 (1.80)	52.7 (2.07)	61.0 (2.40)	47.1 (1.85)	33.5 (1.32)	16.5 (0.65)	33.4 (1.31)	56.5 (2.22)	100.3 (3.95)	70.9 (2.79)	48.1 (1.89)	624.7 (24.59)
Average precipitation days (≥ 1.0 mm)	5.9	5.1	5.7	6.7	6.4	3.6	3.1	3.7	4.2	6.1	6.6	6.0	63.1
Source: Météo-France

== History ==
=== The Argeliers committee ===
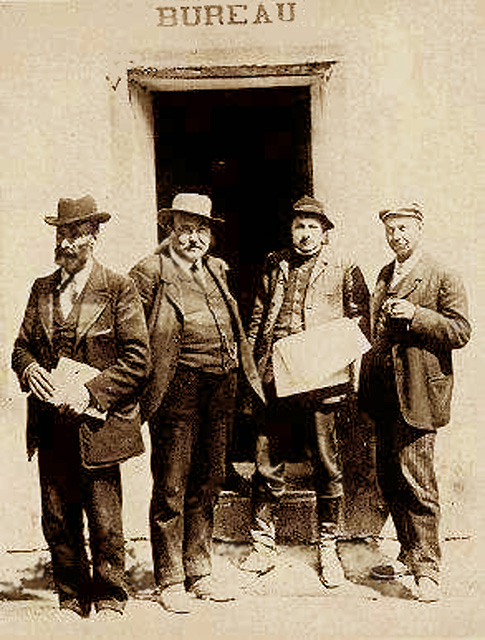
Part of the Argeliers Committee, Marcelin Albert, Elie Cathala, Louis Blanc, and Dr. Senty

On 11 March 1907 a signal for revolt was given by a group of Minervois winemakers in the village of Argeliers. They were led by Marcelin Albert and Élie Bernard who founded the Committee for the Defence of Wine-making or the Argeliers Committee. He organized a march with 87 winemakers to Narbonne for an interview with a parliamentary commission. After his depositions the defence committee went around the town singing for the first time La Vigneronne which from that day became the anthem of the Beggars' revolt.

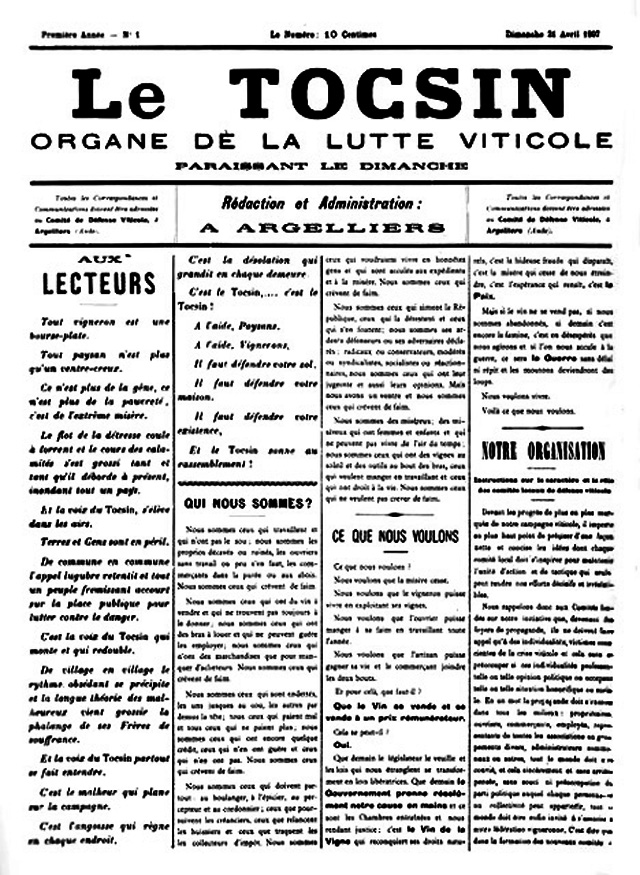
The first issue of Tocsin

Élie Bernard was later appointed Secretary-General of the Confédération générale des vignerons du Midi (General Confederation of winemakers of Midi). It was the Argeliers committee, which included all the producers, who prepared a response to the crisis. On 14 March Albert Sarraut from Bordeaux, Senator for Aude and Under Secretary of State for the Interior, was admonished by Clemenceau for trying to plead for his electorate: "I know the Midi, it will all end with a banquet" he said to Clemenceau who was then President of the Council which sat at Beauveau in the Ministry of Interior.

On 24 March a first meeting organized by the Argeliers Committee was held at Sallèles-d'Aude in front of 300 people. Marcelin Albert was noted for his oratory and charisma. For the winemakers present he became the apostle, the king of beggars, or the Redeemer. The principle of holding a meeting every Sunday in a different town was adopted.

On 21 April 10 to 15 thousand growers gathered at Capestang. On that Sunday the first issue of Tocsin was published by the Argeliers Committee. This was a weekly paper directed by Marcelin Albert with Louis Blanc writing. This issue contained an address to Parliament to have a law voted against fraud.

=== Heraldry ===
Arms of Argeliers	Blazon: Azure, a pale fusilly Argent and Vert.

== Administration ==
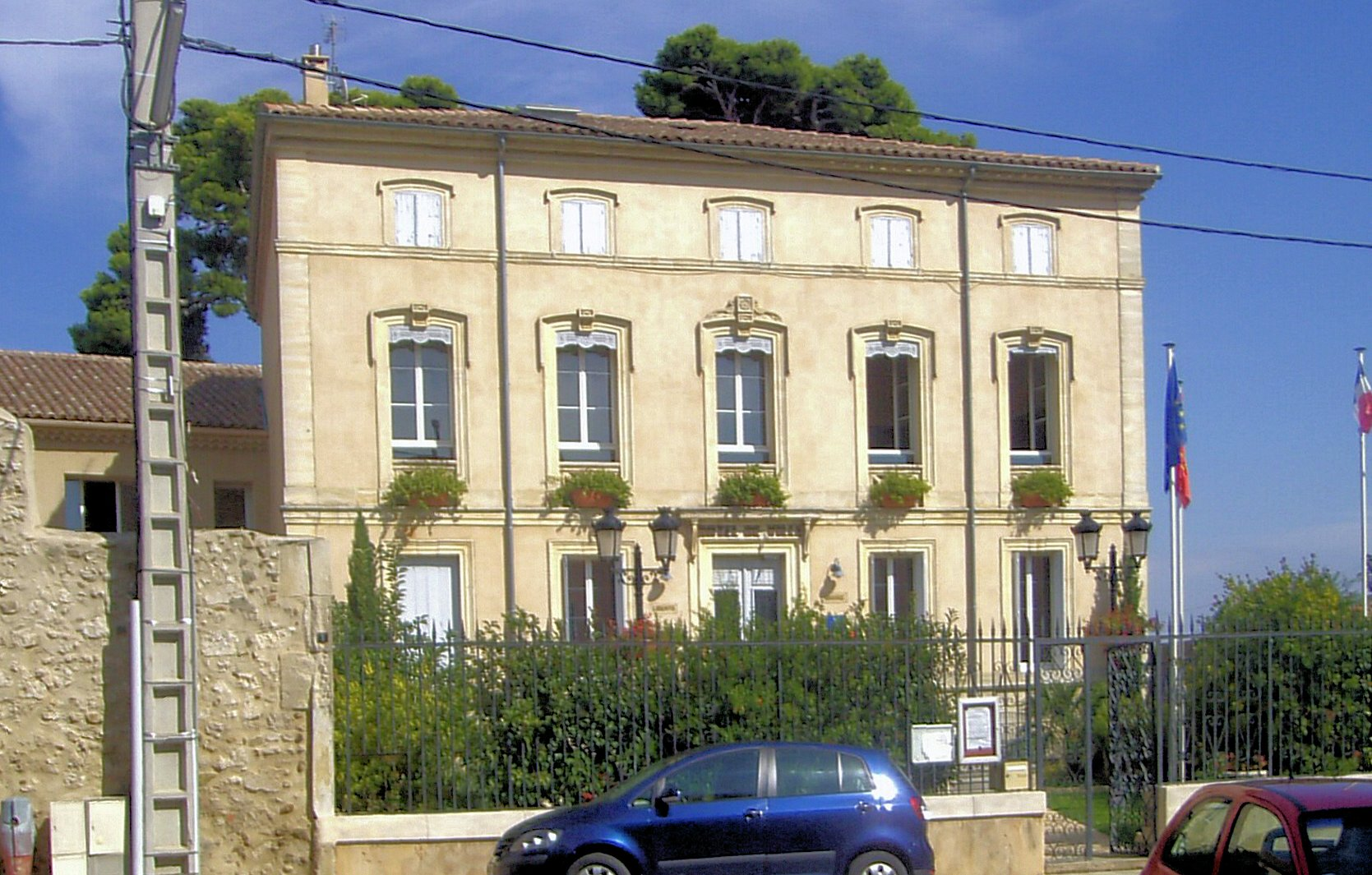
The Town Hall

List of Successive Mayors

From	To	Name	Party
2001	2014	Christian Rouzaud	PS
2014	2020	Gilles Laur	
2020	2026	Gérard Leteissier	

== Demography ==
The inhabitants of the commune are known as Argeliésois or Argeliésoises in French.

Historical population

Year	Pop.	±% p.a.
1793	578	—
1800	475	−2.76%
1806	608	+4.20%
1821	833	+2.12%
1831	760	−0.91%
1836	810	+1.28%
1841	808	−0.05%
1846	828	+0.49%
1851	778	−1.24%
1856	810	+0.81%
1861	851	+0.99%
1866	922	+1.62%
1872	1,019	+1.68%
1876	1,205	+4.28%
1881	1,590	+5.70%
1886	1,258	−4.58%
1891	1,410	+2.31%
1896	1,422	+0.17%
1901	1,425	+0.04%

Year	Pop.	±% p.a.
1906	1,300	−1.82%
1911	1,245	−0.86%
1921	1,188	−0.47%
1926	1,211	+0.38%
1931	1,118	−1.59%
1936	1,147	+0.51%
1946	1,102	−0.40%
1954	1,123	+0.24%
1962	1,159	+0.40%
1968	1,133	−0.38%
1975	1,118	−0.19%
1982	1,218	+1.23%
1990	1,233	+0.15%
1999	1,237	+0.04%
2007	1,546	+2.83%
2012	1,982	+5.09%
2017	2,139	+1.54%
2023	2,124	−0.12%

Source: EHESS and INSEE

== Economy ==
Viticulture: Minervois (AOC) and Languedoc (AOC)

== Sites and Monuments ==
- The Chateau of Argeliers (17th century) is listed as an historical monument.
- The Monumental Fountain of Vendangeur (19th century) in the Place du Vendangeur is registered as an historical object.
- The Church and Cemetery contain several items that are registered as historical objects:
  - A Monument to Raffit (19th century)
  - A Monument to Cabannes Didier (1883)
  - A Painting: The Resurrection (18th century)
  - An Altar, Retable, and Painting: The Crucifixion (17th century)

== Notable people linked to the commune ==
- Marcelin Albert (1851-1921): leader of the winemakers of Midi revolt in 1907. He was born and died in the village and is buried in the cemetery there. A village square is named in his honour;
- Élie Bernard (?-1935): another leader of the winemakers revolt in Languedoc in 1907 with Richard and Cathala: at the start in Argeliers, imprisoned in Béziers prison with Dr. Ernest Ferroul, deputy mayor of Narbonne with Richard and Cathala, appointed director of the union newspaper Winemakers Action, then Secretary General of the General Confederation of winemakers, died in 1935;
- Étienne Bonnes (1894-?): International rugby player born in Argeliers;
- Leon Còrdas (1913-1987): writer, ran a theatre troupe in Argeliers.
- Max Roqueta a contemporary Occitan writer, was born in Argeliers in 1908.

== See also ==
- Communes of the Aude department
