= Bize-Minervois =

Commune in Occitanie, France

- Commune
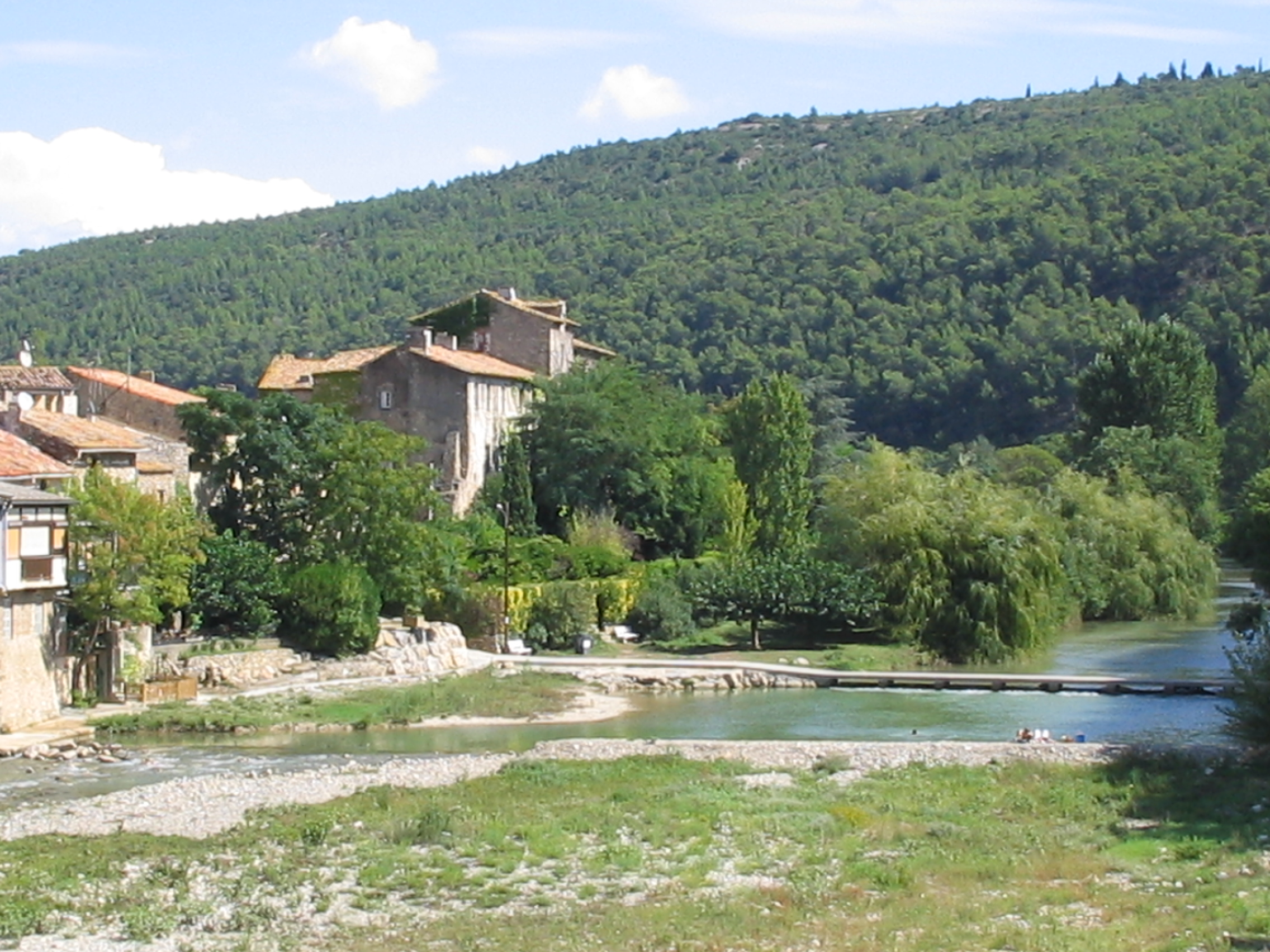
- The Cesse river in Bize-Minervois

- Coat of arms
- Location of Bize-Minervois
- Location within France Location within Occitanie
- Coordinates: 43°19′07″N 2°52′16″E
- Country: France
- Region: Occitania
- Department: Aude
- Arrondissement: Narbonne
- Canton: Le Sud-Minervois
- Intercommunality: Grand Narbonne

Government
  - Mayor (2020–2026): Alain Fabre
- Area^{1}: 20.80 km^{2} (8.03 sq mi)
- Highest elevation: 323 m (1,060 ft)
- Lowest elevation: 34 m (112 ft)
- Population (2023): 1,355
  - Density: 65.14/km^{2} (168.7/sq mi)
- Time zone: UTC+01:00 (CET)
  - Summer (DST): UTC+02:00 (CEST)
- INSEE/Postal code: 11041 /11120
- ^{1} French Land Register data, which excludes lakes, ponds, glaciers > 1 km^{2} (0.386 sq mi or 247 acres) and river estuaries.

Bize-Minervois is a commune in the Aude department in southern France.

== Geography ==
Located on the edge of the Haut-Minervois in the Cesse valley, Bize lies between the fertile sedimentary plain of Narbonne and the causses of the Minervois and the Montagne Noire. Bize is situated approximately three km north of the D5 between Olonzac and Capestang. Bize is a small village with a population approximately 1,200 where 19% of the houses are second homes.

== History ==
Bize is first mentioned in 911 in the will of man named Walcharius who left the lands of the parish of Saint-Saturnin of Bizan to the Archbishop of Narbonne. During the religious wars of the 16th century Bize changed hands many times and in 1573 was fortified as a protestant stronghold against the catholic Bishops of Narbonne.

== Population ==
Historical population
Year	Pop.	±% p.a.
1968	1,001	—
1975	921	−1.18%
1982	783	−2.29%
1990	807	+0.38%
1999	872	+0.86%
2007	1,050	+2.35%
2012	1,097	+0.88%
2017	1,185	+1.56%
2023	1,355	+2.26%
Source: INSEE

== Sights ==
- Caves Las Fonts (Moulin) - Paleolithic caves, now a classified monument where prehistoric remains were discovered in 1827 by French archaeologist and scientist Paul Tournal, founder of the Narbonne Museum.
- La Porte Saint Michel 1236 - the main gate in to the village coming from the direction of Narbonne. A second gate, La Porte St Croix - the entrance from the direction Argeliers, Minerve and Saint-Pons - was demolished in the 19th century to allow easier passage for carts.
- The church of Saint-Michel (18th century)

== Events ==
- 'Fete d l'olivier' - Festival of Olives is held annually in July
- General market every Wednesday morning throughout the year

== Amenities ==
Bize has two bakers, two general stores, a post office, hairdressers, a pharmacy, and a wine cave. There is also a bar and several restaurants. Sporting facilities include a boulodrome, football pitches (home of Bize FC), tennis courts and in the summer the Cesse is dammed to create a freshwater swimming hole.

== See also ==
- Communes of the Aude department
