= Cesse Aqueduct =

Pont-canal de la Cesse
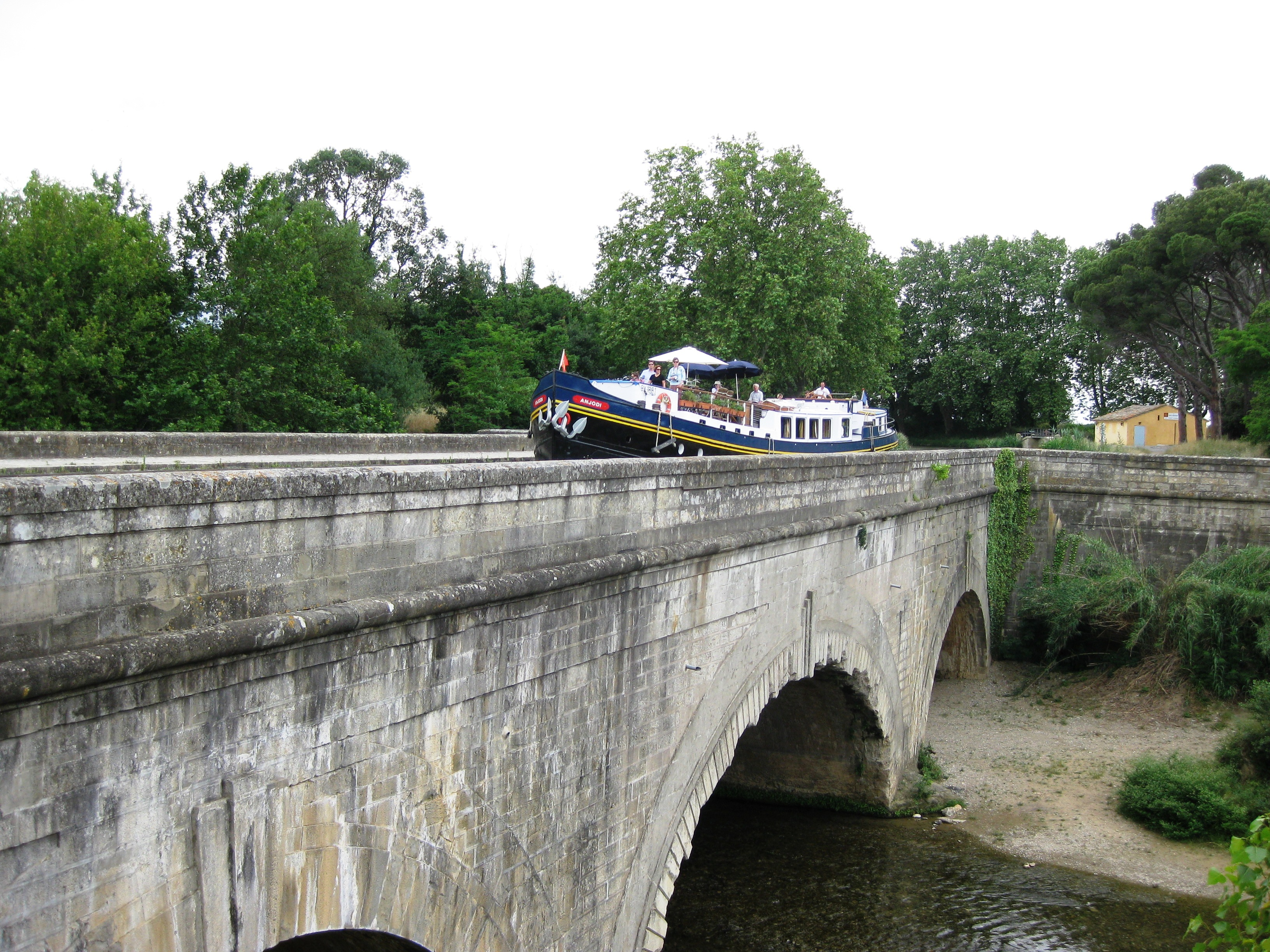
- The Cesse Aqueduct
- Coordinates: 43°16′48″N 2°54′55″E
- Carries: Canal du Midi
- Crosses: River Cesse
- Locale: Mirepeisset

Characteristics
- Trough construction: Masonry
- Pier construction: Masonry
- Towpaths: Both
- Longest span: 18.3 metres (60 ft)
- No. of spans: 3

History
- Opened: 1690

Cesse Aqueduct (French: Pont-Canal de la Cesse) is one of several aqueducts, or water bridge, created for the Canal du Midi. Originally, the canal crossed the Cesse on the level. Pierre-Paul Riquet, the original architect of the canal, had placed a curved dam 205 metres (673 ft) long and 9.10 metres (29.9 ft) high across the Cesse in order to collect water to make the crossing possible; the aqueduct replaced this dam.

The Cesse Aqueduct was designed in 1686 by Marshal Sebastien Vauban and completed in 1690 by Antoine Niquet. Master mason was John Gaudot. It has three spans, the middle being 18.3 metres (60 ft) and the side being 14.6 metres (48 ft) each. It is located in Mirepeisset, Aude (11), Languedoc-Roussillon, France, about one mile from the port town of Le Somail.

== Cesse Aqueduct dans le cinéma ==
In 1967, a scene from "Le Petit Baigneur" directed by Robert Dhéry, with Louis de Funès, was filmed a Cesse Aqueduct.

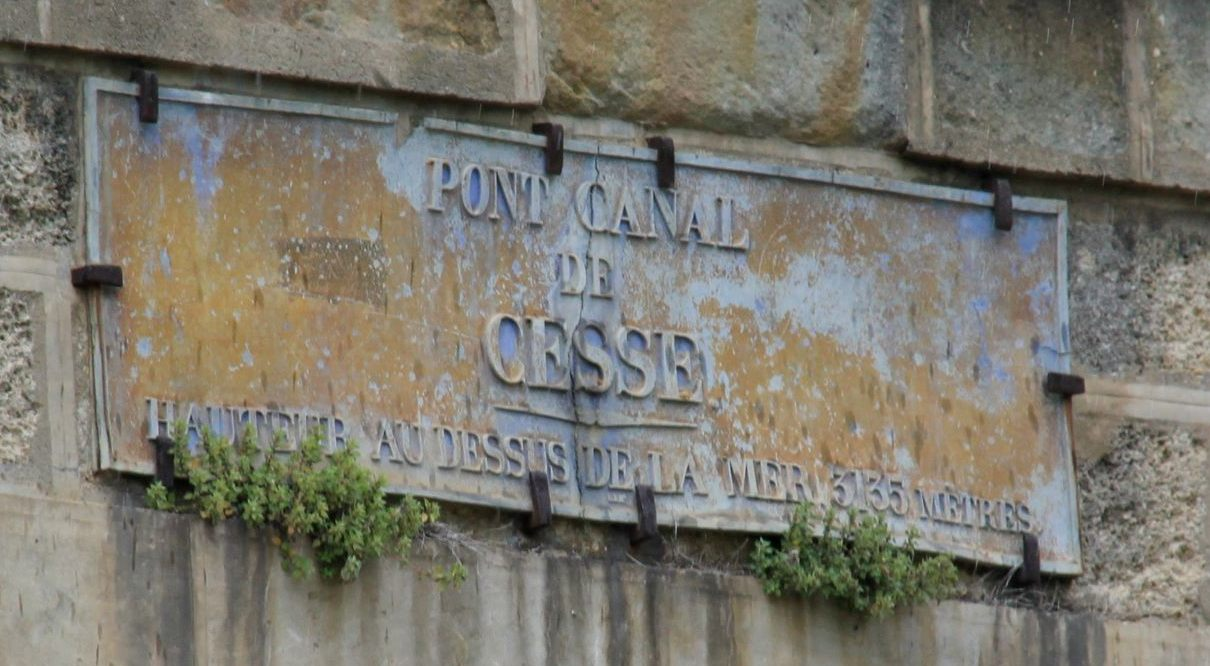
Pont-Canal de la Cesse

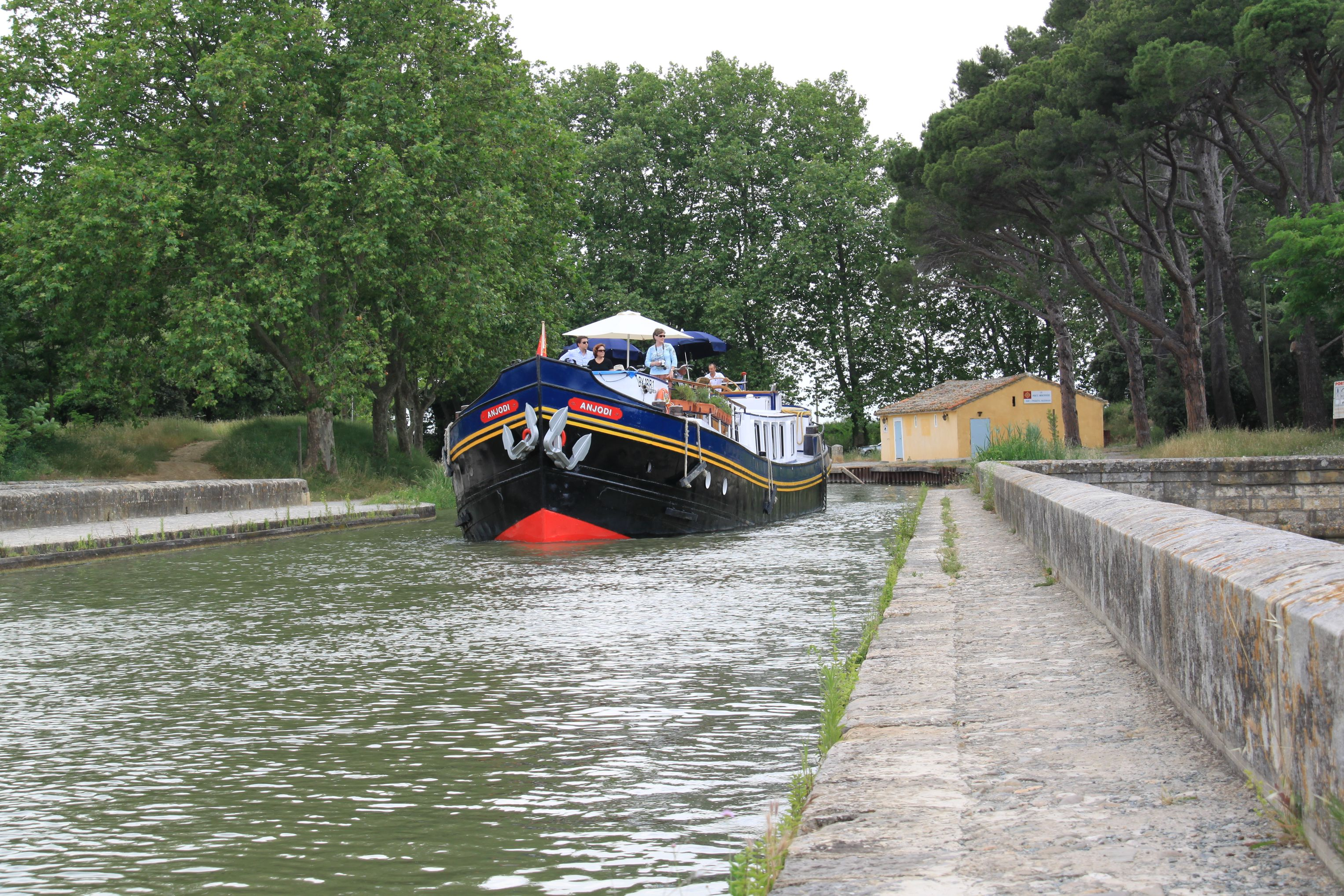
The hotel barge Anjodi crossing the Cesse River on the Canal du Midi.

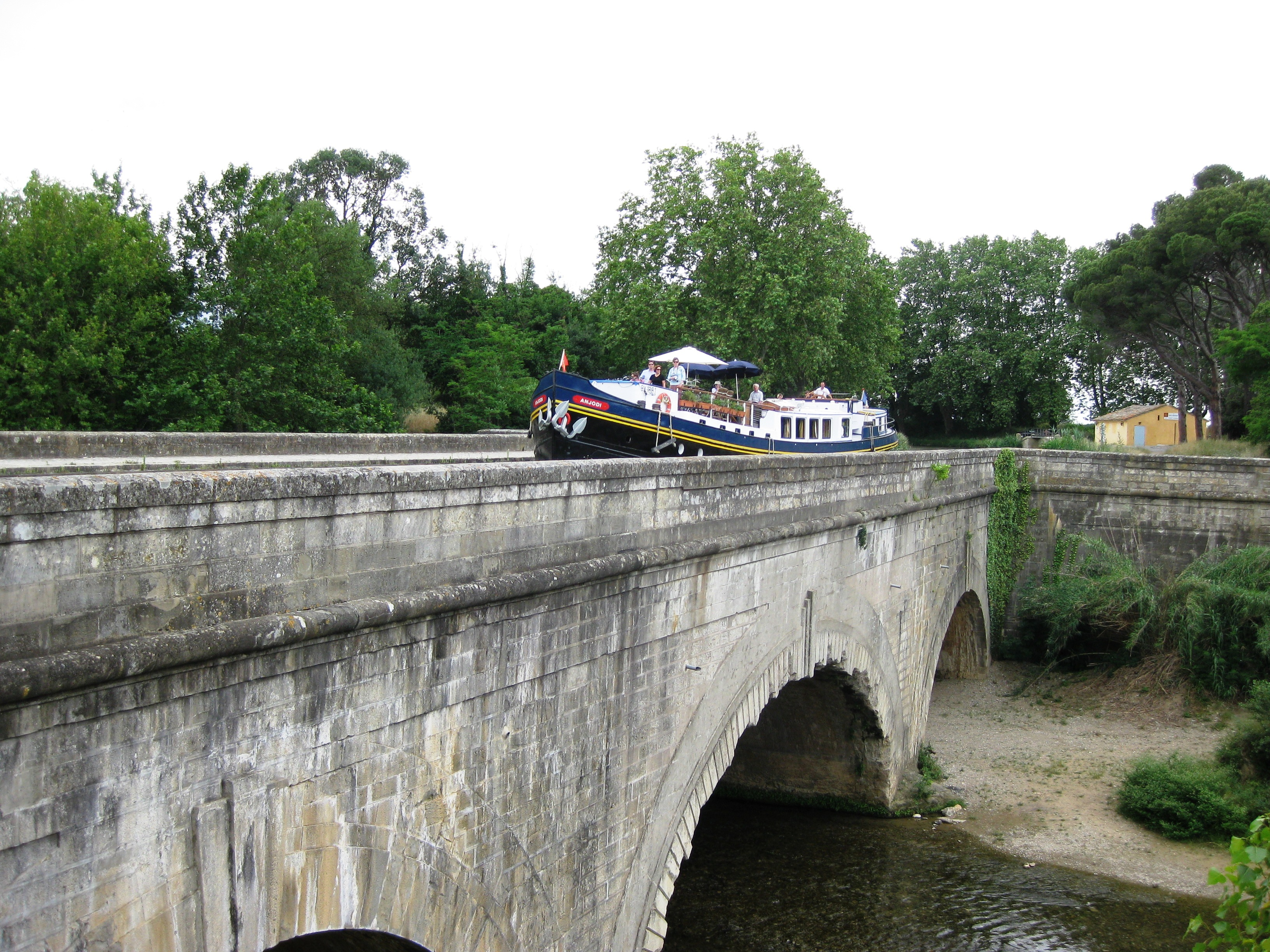
Side view of Anjodi crossing the Cesse. Here, you can see the Cesse River running underneath the Canal du Midi.

== See also ==
- Locks on the Canal du Midi
