= Deux Mers Canal =

Canal in France

Canal des Deux Mers
- English: Two Seas Canal
- Interactive map of Canal des Deux Mers

Specifications
- Length: Canal du Midi 240 km (150 mi); Garonne Lateral Canal 193 km (120 mi)
- Locks: Canal du Midi 65 locks Garonne Lateral Canal 53 locks

History
- Construction began: Canal du Midi 1666; Garonne Lateral Canal 1838
- Date completed: Canal du Midi 1681; Garonne Lateral Canal 1856

Geography
- Beginning coordinates: 44.56°N 0.16°W
- Ending coordinates: 43.4°N 3.7°E

The Canal des Deux Mers (French pronunciation: [kanal de dø mɛʁ]; English: Canal of the Two Seas) has been used to describe two different but similar things since the 1660s. In some cases, it is used interchangeably with the Canal du Midi. In others, it describes the path from the Atlantic to the Mediterranean of which the Canal du Midi was the first artificial component.

== Route ==
The route from the Atlantic to the Mediterranean includes, from west to east, in sequence:

- Enter the Gironde estuary from the Atlantic
- Gironde estuary is formed by the confluence of the Dordogne and the Garonne
- Gironde estuary continues into the Garonne
- The river Garonne connects to the Garonne Lateral Canal at Castets-en-Dorthe
- Garonne Lateral Canal terminates in Toulouse and connects to the Canal du Midi
- Canal du Midi begins in Toulouse, and there are two paths available from it to the Mediterranean.
- Path 1 – Turn off Canal du Midi and join the
  - Canal de Jonction which connects into the river Aude
  - Aude connects to Canal de la Robine
  - Canal de la Robine flows into the Mediterranean Sea
- Path 2 – Continue to end of Canal du Midi and continue into the
  - Étang de Thau which joins to the Canal du Rhône à Sète
  - Canal du Rhône à Sète flows into the Mediterranean Sea

== In popular culture ==
Former performers on The Mary Whitehouse Experience, a 1990s British topical sketch comedy show, Hugh Dennis pedals and David Baddiel e-bikes ("basically, on a moped"), on the towpaths and bicycle routes close to the Deux Mers Canal, from Arcachon to Bordeaux, along the Garonne Canal, along the Canal du Midi, to Le Somail, and to Sète, in a travelogue TV series, Two Men on a Bike on More4.
