= Guillaume Bouzignac =

French composer

- Born: c. 1587; Saint-Nazaire-d'Aude
- Died: c. 1643
- Occupation: Composer

Guillaume Bouzignac (c. 1587 – c. 1643) was a French composer.

Bouzignac was probably born in 1587 in Saint-Nazaire-d'Aude which was then part of Languedoc. He studied at the Cathedral of Narbonne until 1604, and was choirmaster at the Cathedrals of Angoulême, Bourges, Tours, and Clermont-Ferrand.

His motets are preserved in two manuscripts. His motets are highly distinctive: "Simply stated, there is no other music of the time that looks the same on the page or sounds the same as the motets of Bouzignac." "One name in this period rises above those of his contemporaries for all sacred music, including Masses: that of Guillaume Bouzignac." His dialogue motets, such as Unus ex vobis and Dum silentium, are small scale oratorios which anticipate Giacomo Carissimi, and then Marc-Antoine Charpentier (1643–1704) two generations later.

== Discography ==
- Motets, Te Deum Les Arts Florissants dir. William Christie Harmonia Mundi HMC 901 471
- Motets with Jean Gilles Leçons de Ténèbres Boston Camerata dir. Joel Cohen Erato 4509 98480-2
- Motets Sächsisches Vocalensemble dir. Matthias Jung TACET S 156 2007
