= La Nouvelle branch =

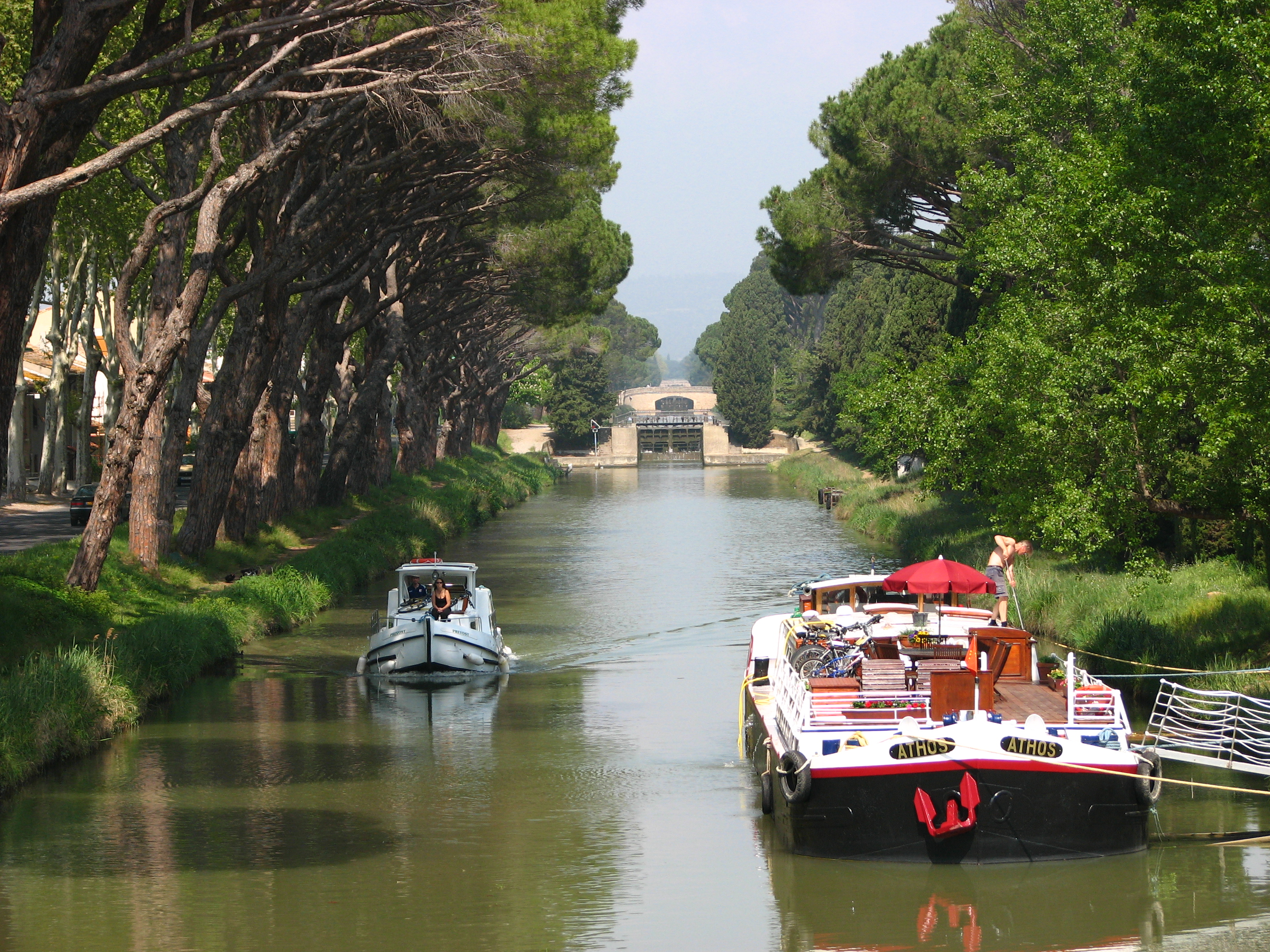
Canal de Jonction at Sallèles d'Aude

The La Nouvelle branch (French: embranchement de La Nouvelle, pronounced [ɑ̃bʁɑ̃ʃmɑ̃ də la nuvɛl]) (Note: It is also sometimes referred to as branche de La Nouvelle or embranchement de Port-la-Nouvelle.) is a 37.3-kilometre (23.2 mi) branch of the Canal du Midi in Aude, southern France which runs from the Canal du Midi through Narbonne and on to the Mediterranean. It is made up of three waterways: the first 5.1 kilometres (3.2 mi) is the Canal de Jonction from the Canal du Midi to the Aude, the second section is 800 metres (2,625 ft) of the Aude itself and the third is the 31.6 kilometres (19.6 mi) Canal de la Robine which enters the Mediterranean at Port-la-Nouvelle. The La Nouvelle branch is designated a UNESCO World Heritage Site as part of the Canal du Midi and is managed by the French navigation authority, Voies navigables de France.

== Canal de Jonction ==
The Canal de Jonction runs in a dead straight line and was built in 1776 to provide access to Narbonne from the Canal du Midi via the Canal de la Robine. The Canal de Jonction enters the Aude some 800 m upstream from where the Canal de la Robine leaves it. Prior to 1776 the Canal du Midi port for Narbonne was Le Somail, 13.8 kilometres (8.6 mi) by road from the city centre.

=== Locks on the Canal de Jonction ===
PK	Lock	Location	Coördinates	Elevation (MASL)
0.3	1	Cesse	43.281825°N 2.923963°E	31.54
1.0	2	Truilhas	43.277101°N 2.929015°E	29.00
1.6	3	Empare	43.272307°N 2.934109°E	25.89
2.3	4	Argeliers	43.267613°N 2.939171°E	22.94
3.0	5	Saint-Cyr	43.267613°N 2.939171°E	19.95
3.7	6	Sallèles	43.257163°N 2.949848°E	17.16
4.9	7	Gailhousty	43.247839°N 2.955702°E	11.76

== The Aude ==
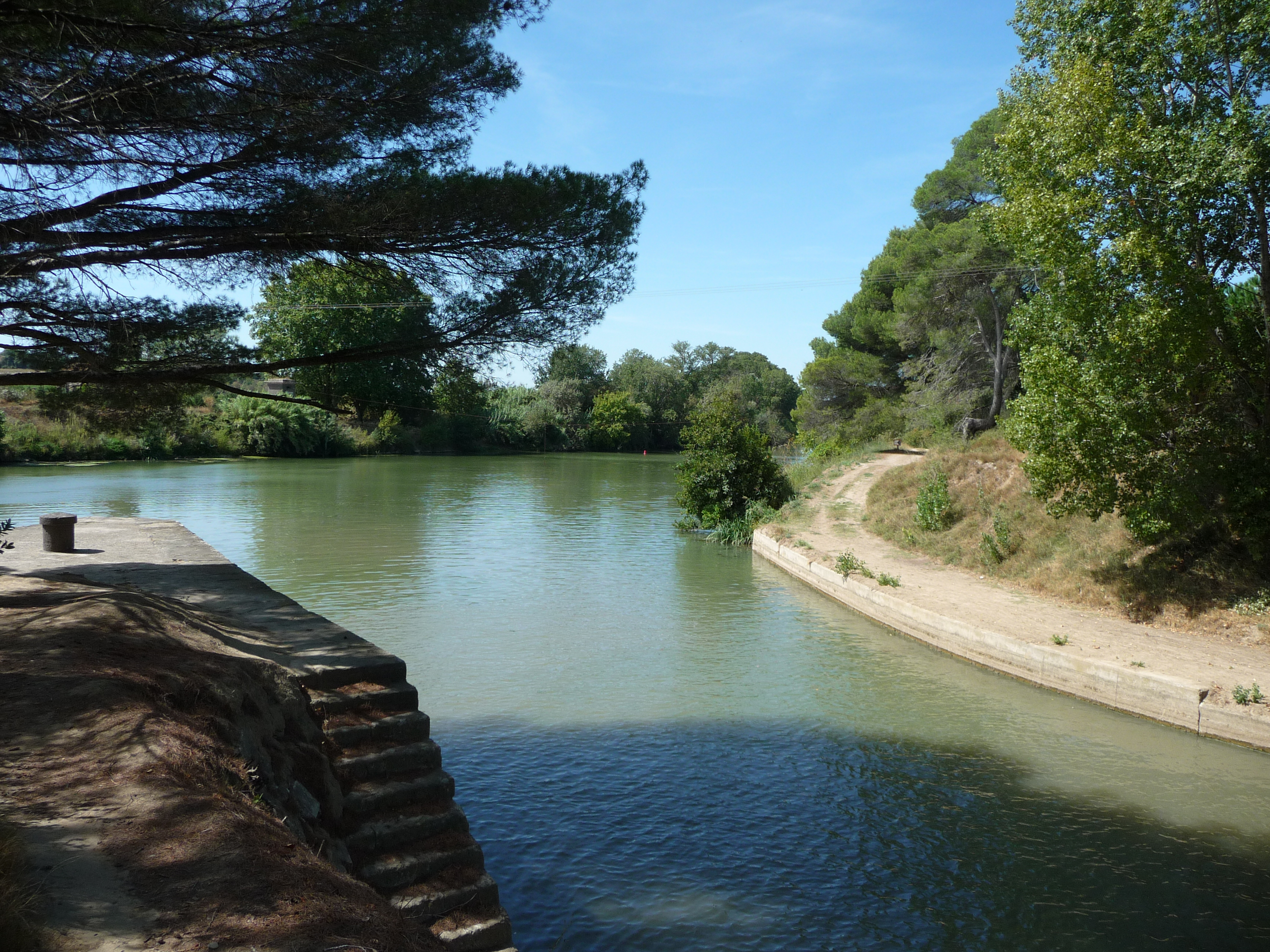
The Canal de Jonction enters the Aude downstream of Gailhousty lock

Navigation is in the river Aude for a distance of only 800 metres (870 yd) between the two canals. However, on leaving the Canal de Jonction it is necessary first to head upstream before turning and coming back downstream against the opposite bank to the Canal de la Robine in order to avoid shallows caused by silt banks in the middle of the channel.

== Canal de la Robine ==
Following its opening in 1681, the commercial success of the Canal du Midi was such that Narbonne traders demanded improved access to it, so in 1686 the Canal de la Robine was constructed by Vauban as a lockless open cut following an abandoned course of the Aude. The northern end of the canal is at the Aude at Moussoulens just south of Sallèles-d'Aude from where goods were transported by land to the Canal du Midi at Le Somail — a journey of approximately 6 kilometres (3.7 mi). A century later, when the Canal de Jonction was constructed, the Canal de la Robine was straightened and six single locks were built to deal with the more severe gradients, Narbonne finally had direct waterway access to the Canal du Midi.

From the Aude the canal passes through the centre of Narbonne and under the Merchants' Bridge (fr: le pont des Marchands) which is one of the few bridges in France which is still lined with houses. From there it runs through Bages and the Ile Sainte Lucie nature reserve before meeting the Mediterranean at Port-la-Nouvelle.

=== Locks on the Canal de la Robine ===
PK	Lock	Location	Coördinates	Elevation^{[A]} (MASL)
5.8	8	Moussoulens	43.244865°N 2.960728°E	9.30
9.8	9	Raonel	43.228013°N 3.003509°E	8.30
14.2	10	Gua	43.191271°N 3.001063°E	6.34
15.3	11	Narbonne	43.184116°N 3.001693°E	4.24
24.1	12	Mandirac	43.122056°N 3.030913°E	2.30
28.6	13	Sainte-Lucie	43.047141°N 3.055856°E	0.80

A. Depending on the River Aude water level.

== See also ==
- Locks on the Canal du Midi
