= Mailhac =

Commune in Occitanie, France

- Commune
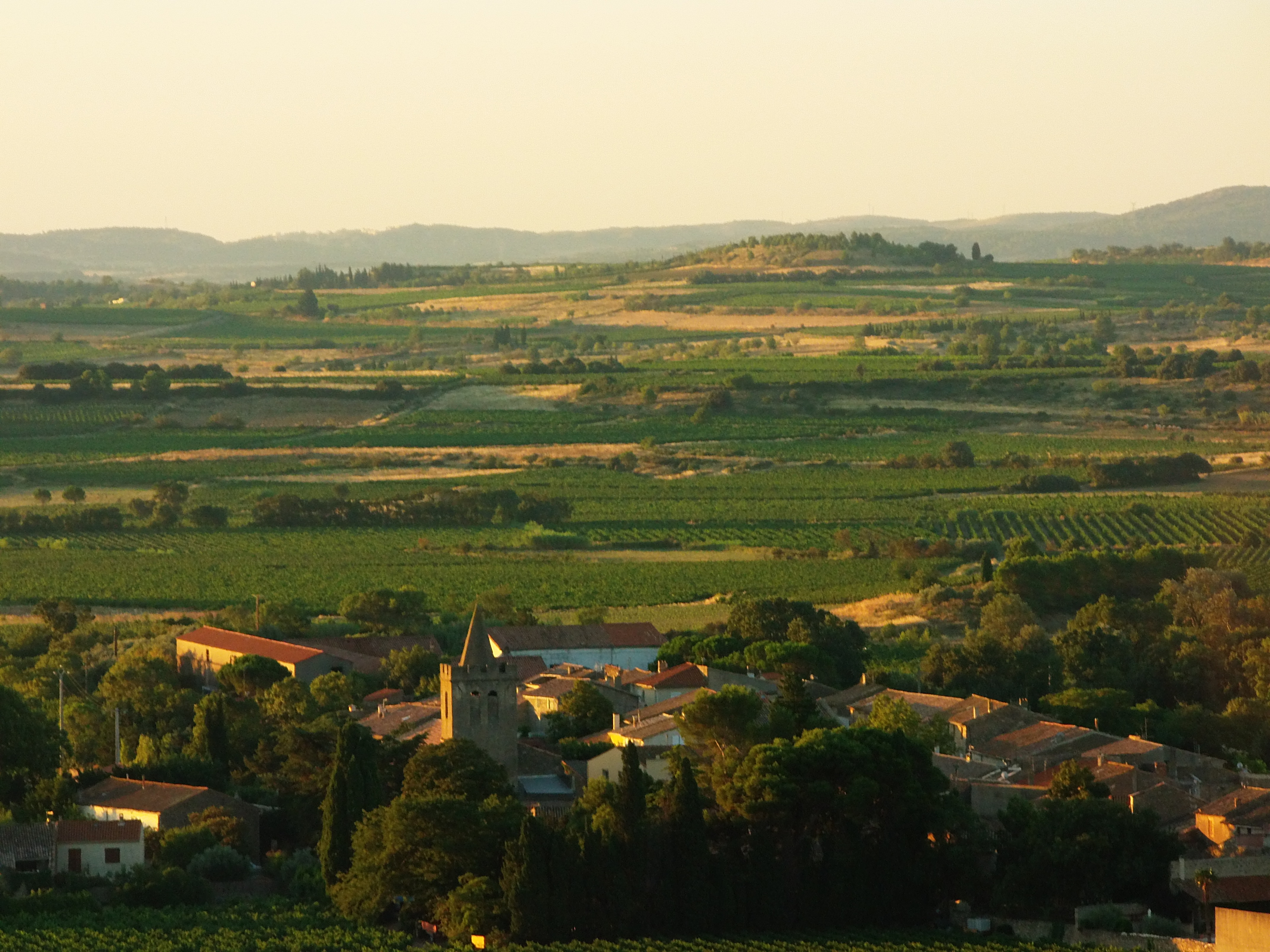
- A general view of Mailhac

- Coat of arms
- Location of Mailhac
- Location within France Location within Occitanie
- Coordinates: 43°18′17″N 2°49′42″E
- Country: France
- Region: Occitania
- Department: Aude
- Arrondissement: Narbonne
- Canton: Le Sud-Minervois
- Intercommunality: Grand Narbonne

Government
  - Mayor (2022–2026): Serge Debled
- Area^{1}: 10.51 km^{2} (4.06 sq mi)
- Elevation: 70 m (230 ft)
- Highest elevation: 247 m (810 ft)
- Lowest elevation: 57 m (187 ft)
- Population (2023): 595
  - Density: 56.6/km^{2} (147/sq mi)
- Time zone: UTC+01:00 (CET)
  - Summer (DST): UTC+02:00 (CEST)
- INSEE/Postal code: 11212 /11120
- ^{1} French Land Register data, which excludes lakes, ponds, glaciers > 1 km^{2} (0.386 sq mi or 247 acres) and river estuaries.

Mailhac (French pronunciation: [majak]; Occitan: Malhac) is a commune in the Aude department in southern France.

== Population ==
Historical population
Year	Pop.	±% p.a.
1968	449	—
1975	403	−1.53%
1982	358	−1.68%
1990	310	−1.78%
1999	373	+2.08%
2007	416	+1.37%
2012	493	+3.45%
2017	567	+2.84%
2023	595	+0.81%
Source: INSEE

== Personalities ==
Its former mayor, Gérard Schivardi, was a candidate in the French presidential election of 2007 but lost the election.

== See also ==
- Communes of the Aude department
