= Ventenac-en-Minervois =

Commune in Occitanie, France

- Commune
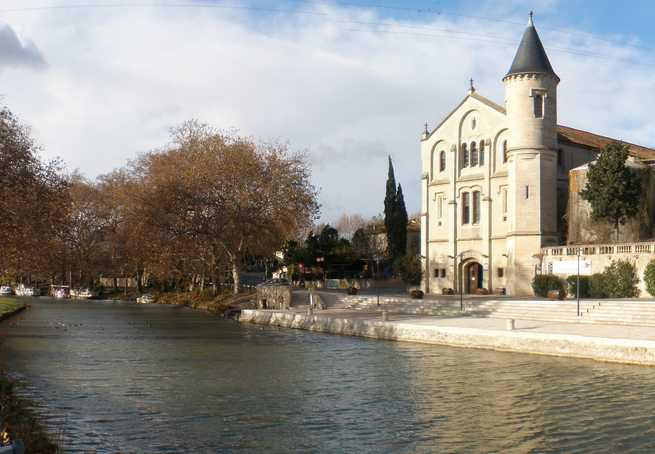
- The chateau and Canal du Midi in Ventenac-en-Minervois

- Coat of arms
- Location of Ventenac-en-Minervois
- Location within France Location within Occitanie
- Coordinates: 43°14′58″N 2°51′37″E
- Country: France
- Region: Occitania
- Department: Aude
- Arrondissement: Narbonne
- Canton: Le Sud-Minervois
- Intercommunality: Grand Narbonne

Government
  - Mayor (2020–2026): Christian Lapalu
- Area^{1}: 6.20 km^{2} (2.39 sq mi)
- Elevation: 32 m (105 ft)
- Highest elevation: 100 m (330 ft)
- Lowest elevation: 18 m (59 ft)
- Population (2023): 644
  - Density: 104/km^{2} (269/sq mi)
- Time zone: UTC+01:00 (CET)
  - Summer (DST): UTC+02:00 (CEST)
- INSEE/Postal code: 11405 /11120
- ^{1} French Land Register data, which excludes lakes, ponds, glaciers > 1 km^{2} (0.386 sq mi or 247 acres) and river estuaries.

Ventenac-en-Minervois is a commune in the Aude department in southern France.

== Population ==
Historical population
Year	Pop.	±% p.a.
1968	334	—
1975	289	−2.05%
1982	289	+0.00%
1990	321	+1.32%
1999	349	+0.93%
2007	499	+4.57%
2012	533	+1.33%
2017	553	+0.74%
2023	644	+2.57%
Source: INSEE

== See also ==
- Communes of the Aude department
