= Moussan =

Commune in Occitanie, France

- Commune
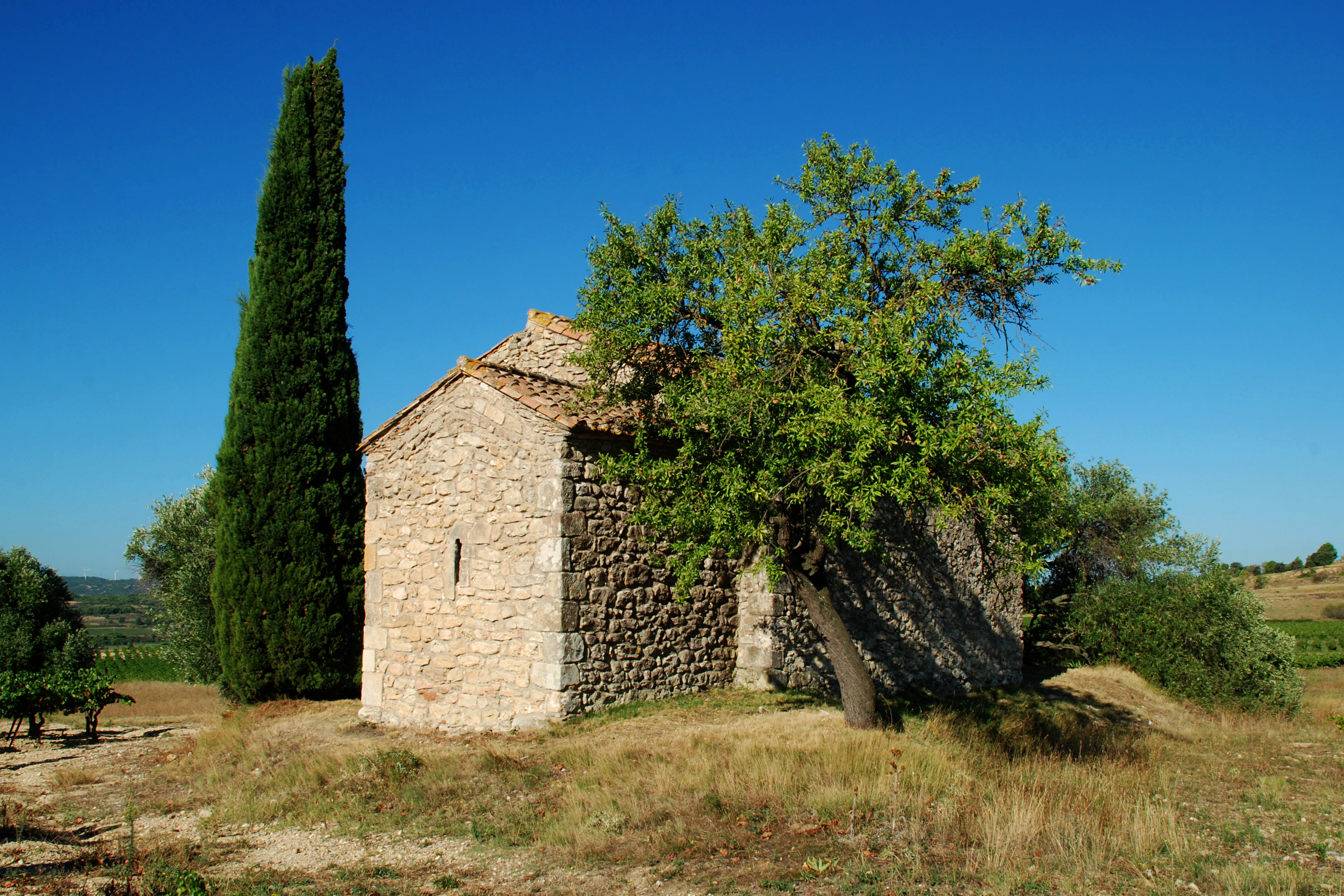
- The chapel in Moussan

- Coat of arms
- Location of Moussan
- Location within France Location within Occitanie
- Coordinates: 43°13′55″N 2°57′03″E
- Country: France
- Region: Occitania
- Department: Aude
- Arrondissement: Narbonne
- Canton: Le Sud-Minervois
- Intercommunality: Grand Narbonne

Government
  - Mayor (2020–2026): Jean-Marie Monié
- Area^{1}: 14.88 km^{2} (5.75 sq mi)
- Elevation: 30 m (98 ft)
- Highest elevation: 124 m (407 ft)
- Lowest elevation: 6 m (20 ft)
- Population (2023): 2,093
  - Density: 140.7/km^{2} (364.3/sq mi)
- Time zone: UTC+01:00 (CET)
  - Summer (DST): UTC+02:00 (CEST)
- INSEE/Postal code: 11258 /11120
- ^{1} French Land Register data, which excludes lakes, ponds, glaciers > 1 km^{2} (0.386 sq mi or 247 acres) and river estuaries.

Moussan (French pronunciation: [musɑ̃]; Occitan: Moçan) is a commune in the Aude department in southern France.

== Population ==
Historical population
Year	Pop.	±% p.a.
1968	851	—
1975	810	−0.70%
1982	955	+2.38%
1990	1,102	+1.81%
1999	1,174	+0.71%
2007	1,709	+4.81%
2012	1,818	+1.24%
2017	1,940	+1.31%
2023	2,093	+1.27%
Source: INSEE

== See also ==
- Communes of the Aude department
