= Grand Narbonne =

Le Grand Narbonne
- Communauté d'agglomération
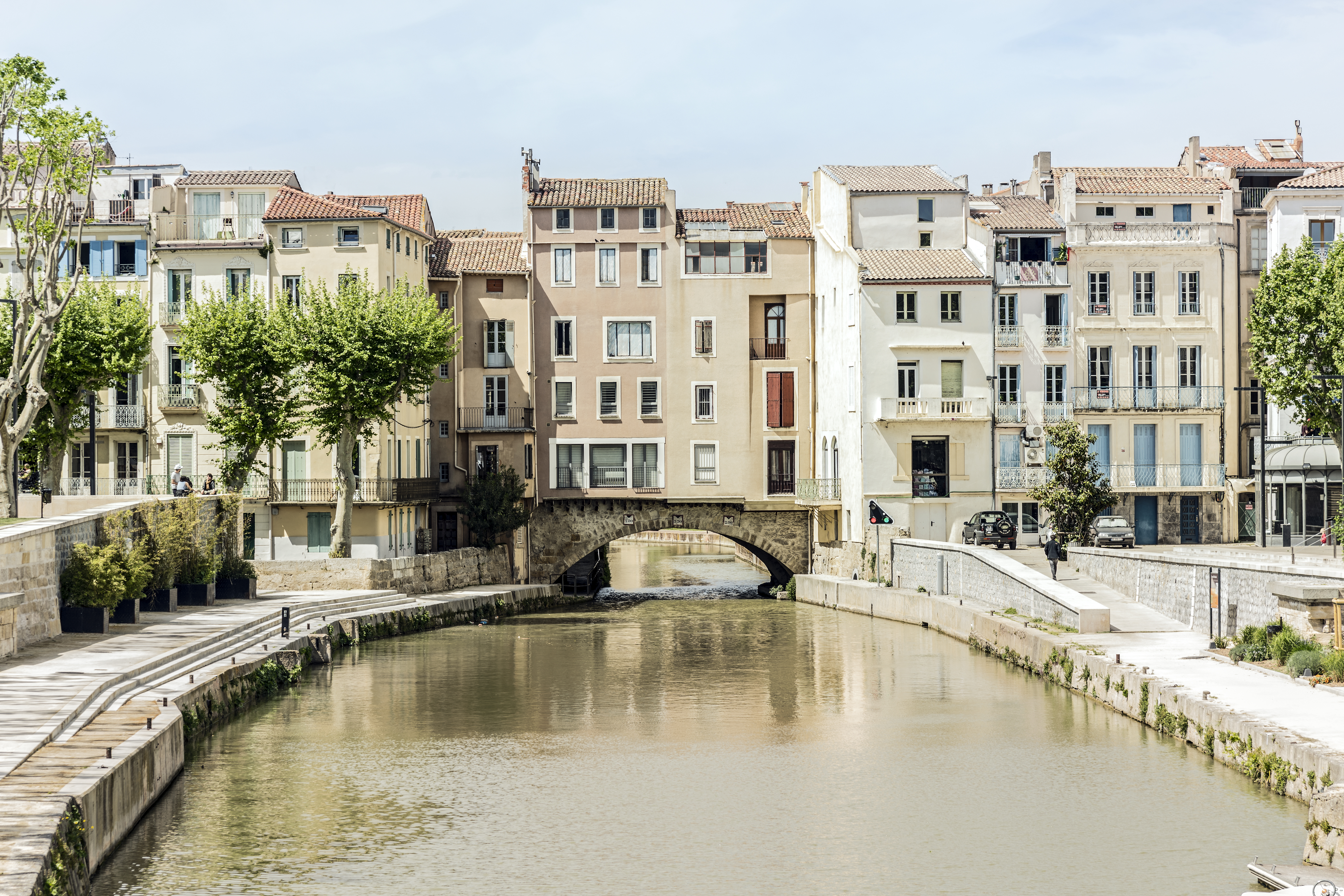
- Interactive map of Le Grand Narbonne
- Coordinates: 43°10′N 03°00′E
- Country: France
- Region: Occitania
- Department: Aude
- No. of communes: {{{nbcomm}}}
- Established: 2002
- Area: 846.6 km^{2} (326.9 sq mi)
- Population (2017): 129,134
  - Density: 152.5/km^{2} (395.1/sq mi)
- Website: www.legrandnarbonne.com

Le Grand Narbonne is the communauté d'agglomération, an intercommunal structure, centred on the city of Narbonne. It is located in the Aude department, in the Occitanie region, southern France. It was created in December 2002. Its seat is in Narbonne. Its area is 846.6 km^{2}. Its population was 129,134 in 2017, of which 54,700 in Narbonne proper.

== Composition ==
The communauté d'agglomération consists of the following 37 communes:

1. Argeliers
2. Armissan
3. Bages
4. Bizanet
5. Bize-Minervois
6. Caves
7. Coursan
8. Cuxac-d'Aude
9. Fleury
10. Ginestas
11. Gruissan
12. Leucate
13. Mailhac
14. Marcorignan
15. Mirepeisset
16. Montredon-des-Corbières
17. Moussan
18. Narbonne
19. Névian
20. Ouveillan
21. La Palme
22. Peyriac-de-Mer
23. Portel-des-Corbières
24. Port-la-Nouvelle
25. Pouzols-Minervois
26. Raissac-d'Aude
27. Roquefort-des-Corbières
28. Sainte-Valière
29. Saint-Marcel-sur-Aude
30. Saint-Nazaire-d'Aude
31. Sallèles-d'Aude
32. Salles-d'Aude
33. Sigean
34. Treilles
35. Ventenac-en-Minervois
36. Villedaigne
37. Vinassan
