= Ginestas =

Commune in Occitanie, France

- Commune
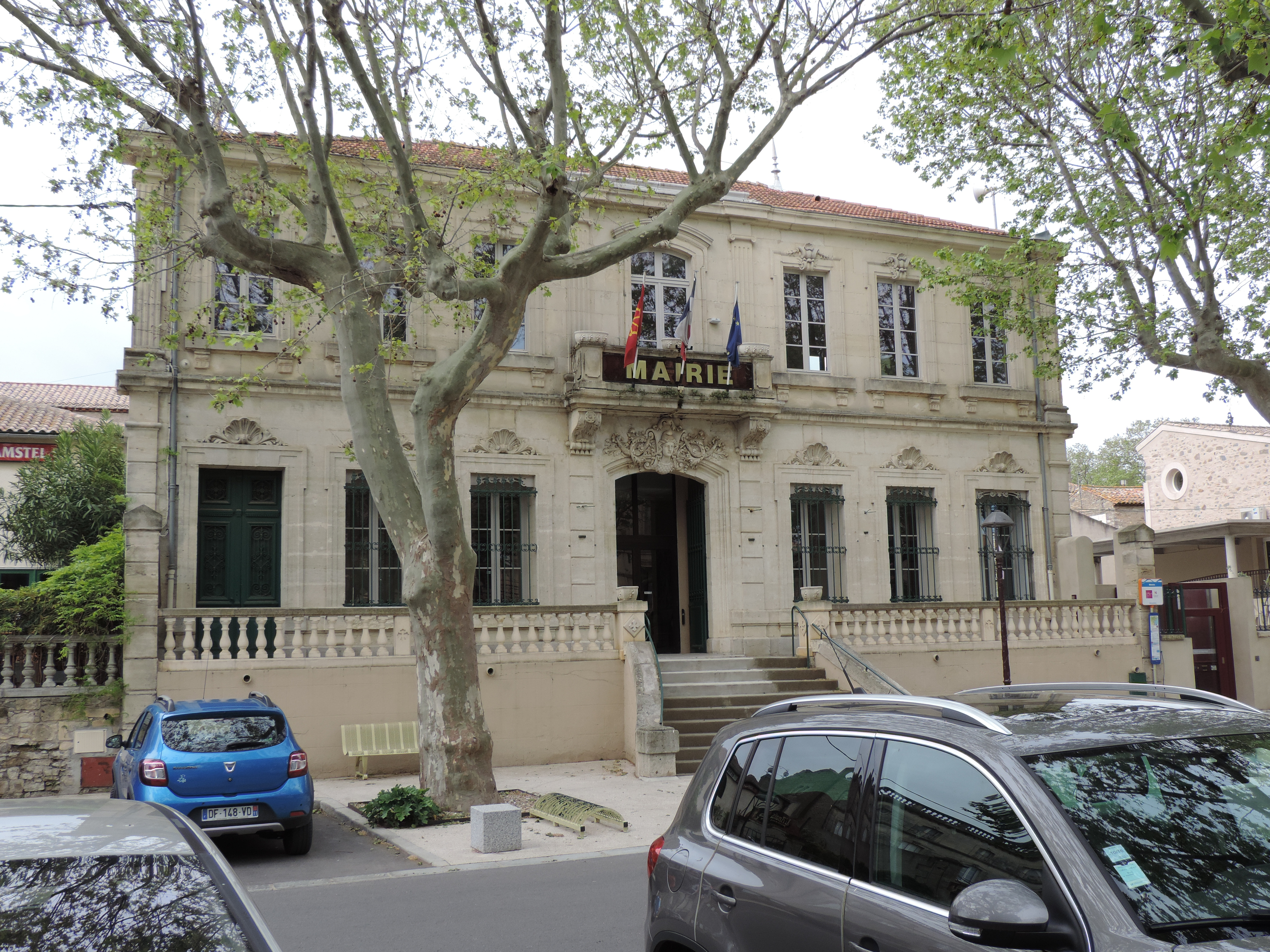
- Town hall of Ginestas

- Coat of arms
- Location of Ginestas
- Location within France Location within Occitanie
- Coordinates: 43°16′09″N 2°52′21″E
- Country: France
- Region: Occitania
- Department: Aude
- Arrondissement: Narbonne
- Canton: Le Sud-Minervois
- Intercommunality: Grand Narbonne

Government
  - Mayor (2024–2026): Anne-Sophie Ledoyen
- Area^{1}: 9.50 km^{2} (3.67 sq mi)
- Elevation: 50 m (160 ft)
- Highest elevation: 115 m (377 ft)
- Lowest elevation: 30 m (98 ft)
- Population (2023): 1,611
  - Density: 170/km^{2} (439/sq mi)
- Time zone: UTC+01:00 (CET)
  - Summer (DST): UTC+02:00 (CEST)
- INSEE/Postal code: 11164 /11120
- ^{1} French Land Register data, which excludes lakes, ponds, glaciers > 1 km^{2} (0.386 sq mi or 247 acres) and river estuaries.

Ginestas (French pronunciation: [ʒinɛstas]; Occitan: Ginestars) is a commune of the Aude department in southern France.

== Population ==
Historical population
Year	Pop.	±% p.a.
1968	981	—
1975	769	−3.42%
1982	740	−0.55%
1990	887	+2.29%
1999	1,059	+1.99%
2007	1,328	+2.87%
2012	1,365	+0.55%
2017	1,445	+1.15%
2023	1,611	+1.83%
Source: INSEE

== See also ==
- Le Somail
- Communes of the Aude department
