= Capestang Bridge =

Bridge in Occitania, France

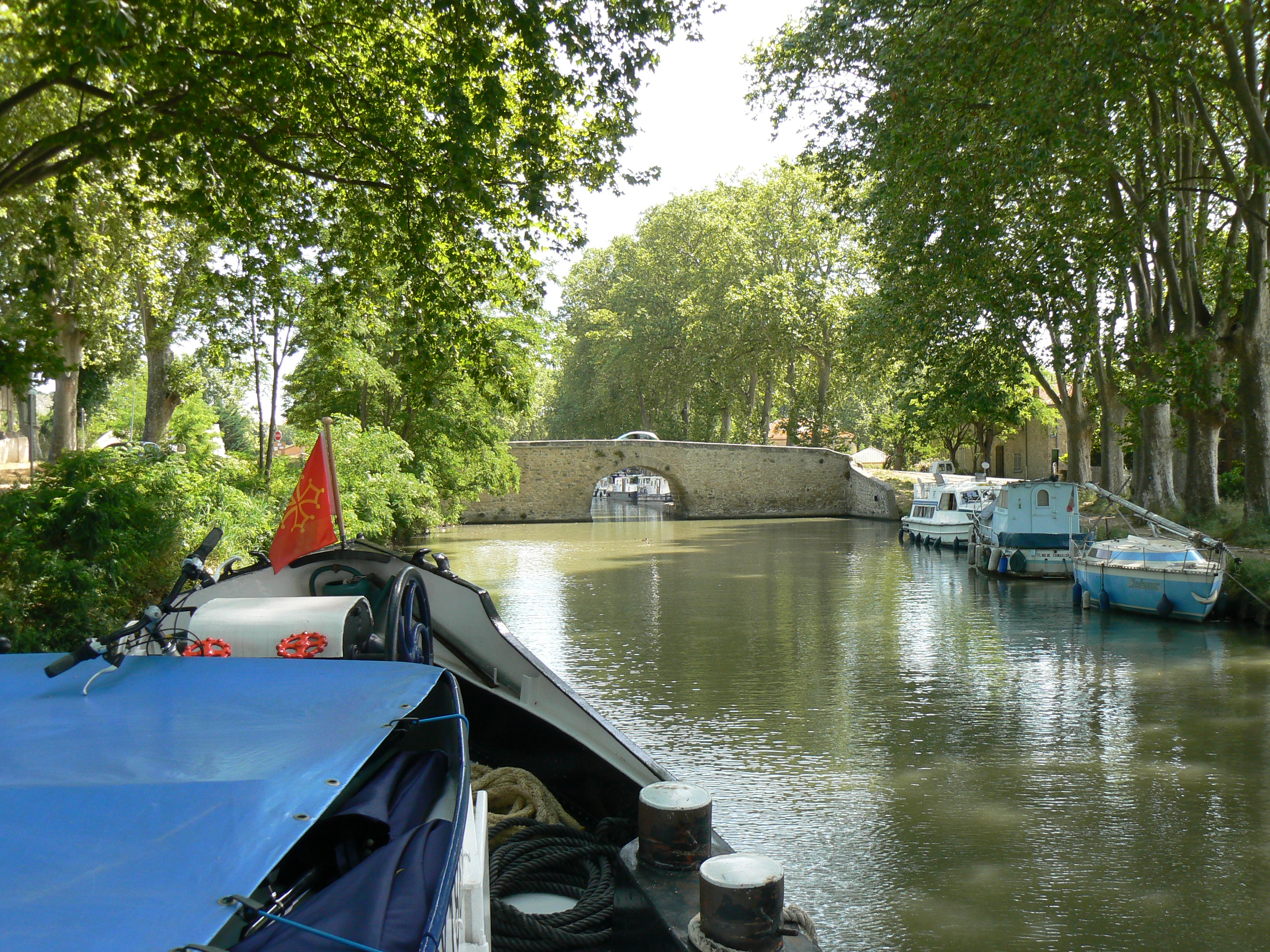
Approaching the Canal du Midi bridge at Capestang 43°19′51.78″N 3°02′45.68″E

The Capestang bridge over the Canal du Midi at PK 189 at Capestang is a very important structure for those wishing to motor on the canal. It is used as a measuring device as it is the lowest structure on the canal. A boat, with an air draft under 3.3 m (11 ft) at the center and assuming a beam no more than 5 m (16 ft), a height of no more than 2.4 m (7.9 ft) at the extremities, should make it under the bridge. A British boat builder who builds boats for several of the boat hire companies in France builds their boats to meet these requirements.

Even though rebuilt in recent times, being historic, it was felt necessary to retain its small dimensions.
