= Marcorignan =

Commune in Occitanie, France

- Commune
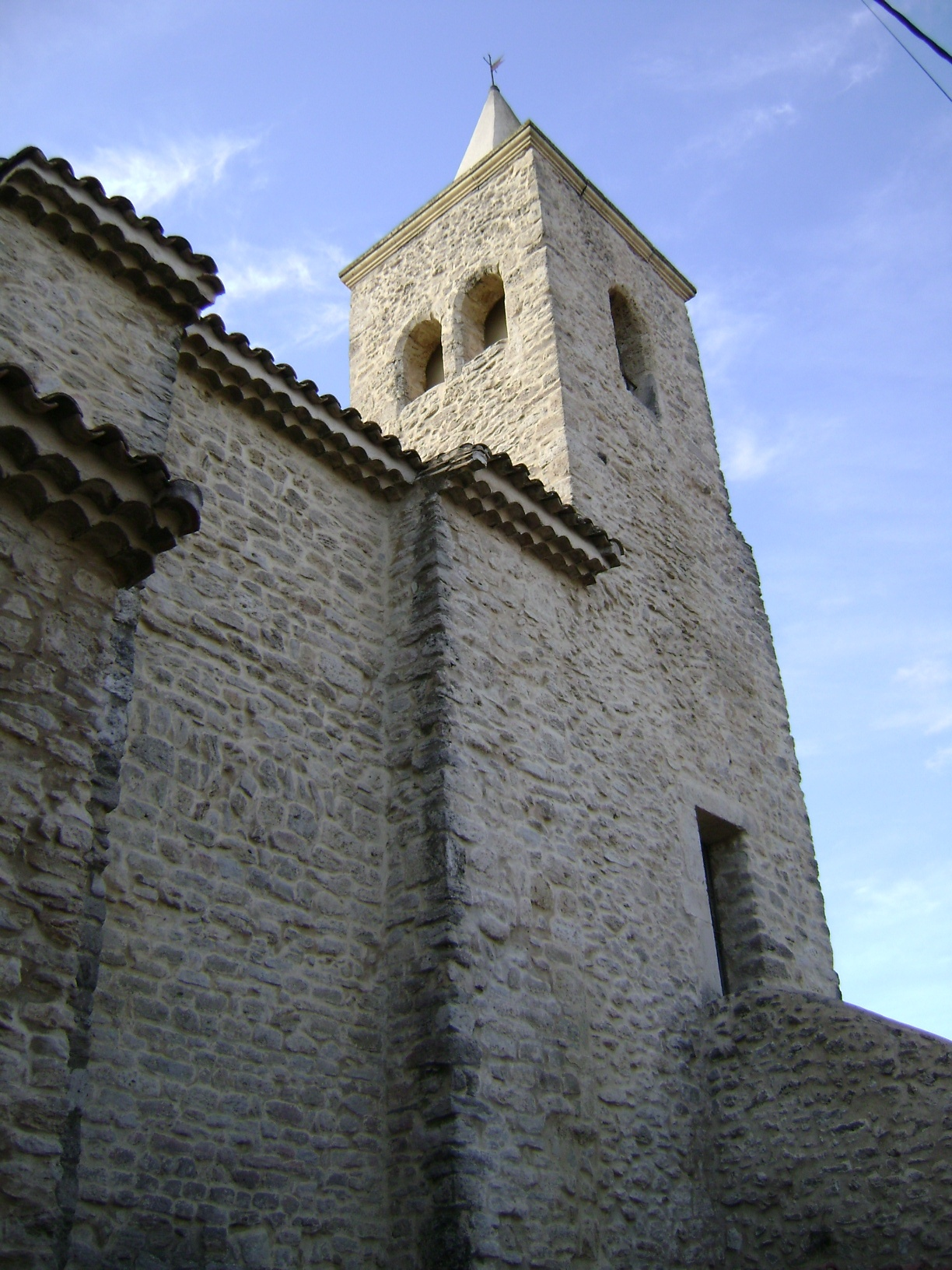
- The church in Marcorignan

- Coat of arms
- Location of Marcorignan
- Location within France Location within Occitanie
- Coordinates: 43°13′35″N 2°55′20″E
- Country: France
- Region: Occitania
- Department: Aude
- Arrondissement: Narbonne
- Canton: Le Sud-Minervois
- Intercommunality: Grand Narbonne

Government
  - Mayor (2023–2026): Eric Banos
- Area^{1}: 5.64 km^{2} (2.18 sq mi)
- Elevation: 31 m (102 ft)
- Highest elevation: 89 m (292 ft)
- Lowest elevation: 14 m (46 ft)
- Population (2023): 1,333
  - Density: 236/km^{2} (612/sq mi)
- Time zone: UTC+01:00 (CET)
  - Summer (DST): UTC+02:00 (CEST)
- INSEE/Postal code: 11217 /11120
- ^{1} French Land Register data, which excludes lakes, ponds, glaciers > 1 km^{2} (0.386 sq mi or 247 acres) and river estuaries.

Marcorignan (French pronunciation: [maʁkɔʁiɲɑ̃]) is a commune in the Aude department in southern France.

== Geography ==
The river Orbieu forms most of the commune's western border, then flows into the Aude, which forms all of its northern border.

== Population ==
Historical population
| Year | Pop. | ±% p.a. |
|---|---|---|
| 1968 | 548 | — |
| 1975 | 669 | +2.89% |
| 1982 | 767 | +1.97% |
| 1990 | 954 | +2.76% |
| 1999 | 1,068 | +1.26% |
| 2007 | 1,102 | +0.39% |
| 2012 | 1,196 | +1.65% |
| 2017 | 1,300 | +1.68% |
| 2023 | 1,333 | +0.42% |
Source: INSEE

== See also ==
- Communes of the Aude department
