= Saint-Marcel-sur-Aude =

Commune in Occitanie, France

- Commune
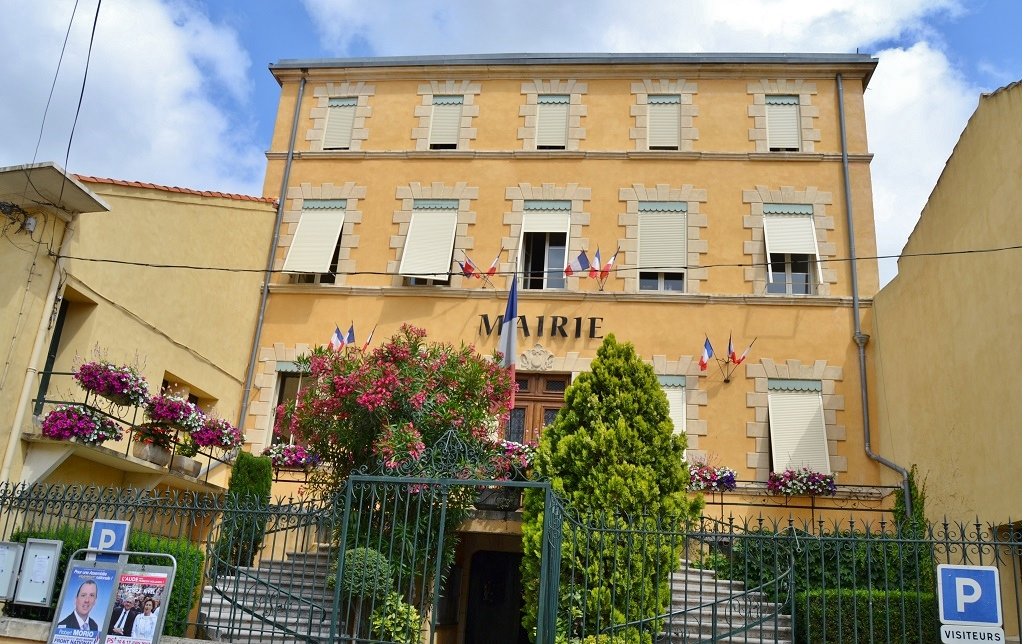
- The town hall in Saint-Marcel-sur-Aude

- Coat of arms
- Location of Saint-Marcel-sur-Aude
- Location within France Location within Occitanie
- Coordinates: 43°14′41″N 2°55′24″E
- Country: France
- Region: Occitania
- Department: Aude
- Arrondissement: Narbonne
- Canton: Le Sud-Minervois
- Intercommunality: Grand Narbonne

Government
  - Mayor (2023–2026): Frederic Henri Nunez
- Area^{1}: 8.37 km^{2} (3.23 sq mi)
- Highest elevation: 31 m (102 ft)
- Lowest elevation: 9 m (30 ft)
- Population (2023): 2,014
  - Density: 241/km^{2} (623/sq mi)
- Time zone: UTC+01:00 (CET)
  - Summer (DST): UTC+02:00 (CEST)
- INSEE/Postal code: 11353 /11120
- ^{1} French Land Register data, which excludes lakes, ponds, glaciers > 1 km^{2} (0.386 sq mi or 247 acres) and river estuaries.

Saint-Marcel-sur-Aude (French pronunciation: [sɛ̃ maʁsɛl syʁ od], literally Saint-Marcel on Aude; Occitan: Sant Marcèl) is a commune in the Aude department in southern France.

== Population ==
Historical population
Year	Pop.	±% p.a.
1968	878	—
1975	847	−0.51%
1982	927	+1.30%
1990	1,097	+2.13%
1999	1,268	+1.62%
2007	1,527	+2.35%
2012	1,773	+3.03%
2017	2,005	+2.49%
2023	2,014	+0.07%
Source: INSEE

== See also ==
- Communes of the Aude department
