= Sainte-Valière =

Commune in Occitanie, France

- Commune
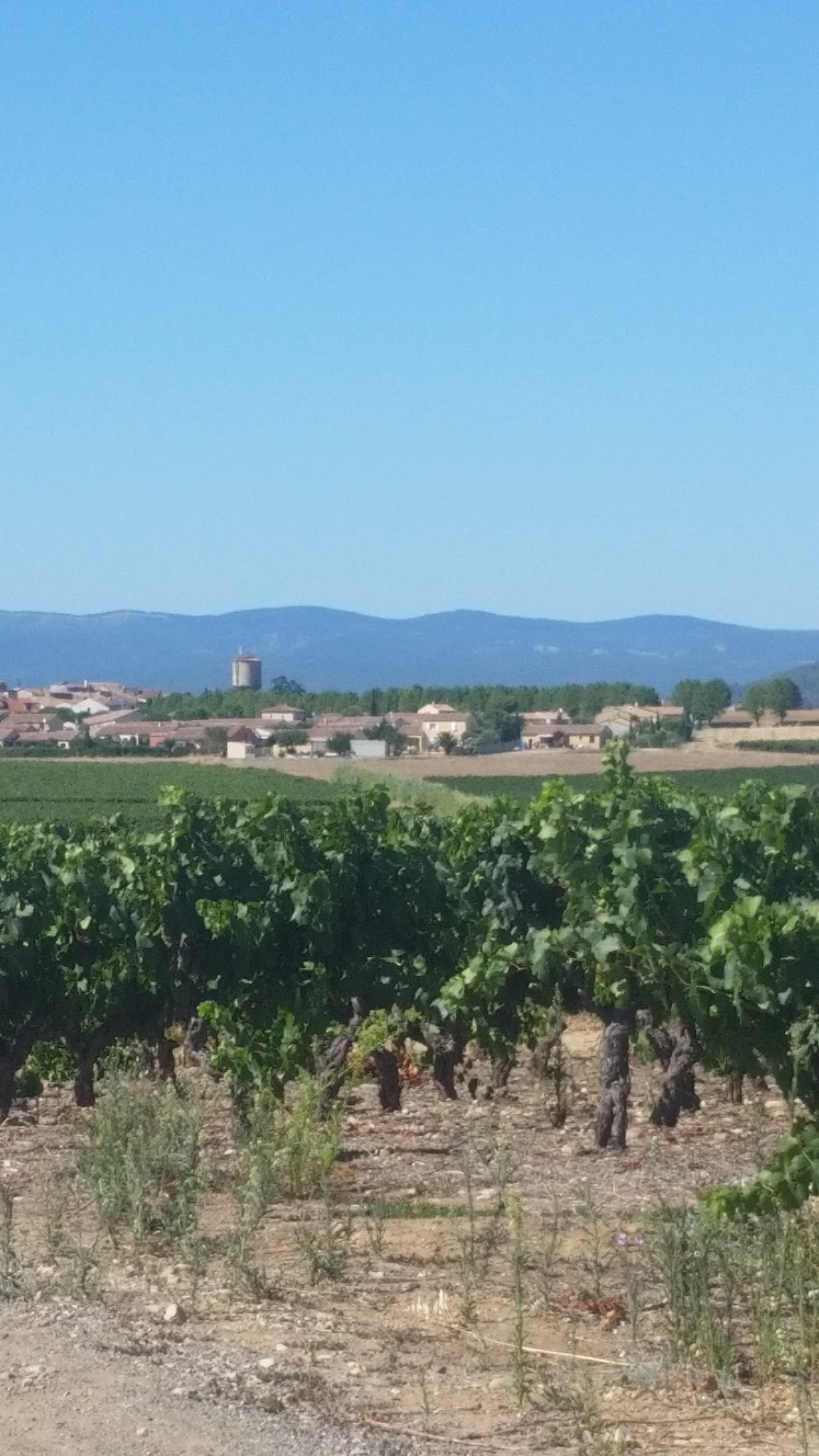
- A general view of Sainte-Valière

- Coat of arms
- Location of Sainte-Valière
- Location within France Location within Occitanie
- Coordinates: 43°16′24″N 2°50′33″E
- Country: France
- Region: Occitania
- Department: Aude
- Arrondissement: Narbonne
- Canton: Le Sud-Minervois
- Intercommunality: Grand Narbonne

Government
  - Mayor (2020–2026): Viviane Durand
- Area^{1}: 6.39 km^{2} (2.47 sq mi)
- Elevation: 80 m (260 ft)
- Highest elevation: 115 m (377 ft)
- Lowest elevation: 28 m (92 ft)
- Population (2023): 534
  - Density: 83.6/km^{2} (216/sq mi)
- Time zone: UTC+01:00 (CET)
  - Summer (DST): UTC+02:00 (CEST)
- INSEE/Postal code: 11366 /11120
- ^{1} French Land Register data, which excludes lakes, ponds, glaciers > 1 km^{2} (0.386 sq mi or 247 acres) and river estuaries.

Sainte-Valière (French pronunciation: [sɛ̃t valjɛʁ]; Occitan: Santa Valièira) is a commune in the Aude department in southern France.

== Population ==
Historical population
Year	Pop.	±% p.a.
1968	377	—
1975	292	−3.58%
1982	324	+1.50%
1990	392	+2.41%
1999	392	+0.00%
2007	539	+4.06%
2012	557	+0.66%
2017	563	+0.21%
2023	534	−0.88%
Source: INSEE

== See also ==
- Communes of the Aude department
