= Canet, Aude =

Commune in Occitanie, France

Canet
- Commune
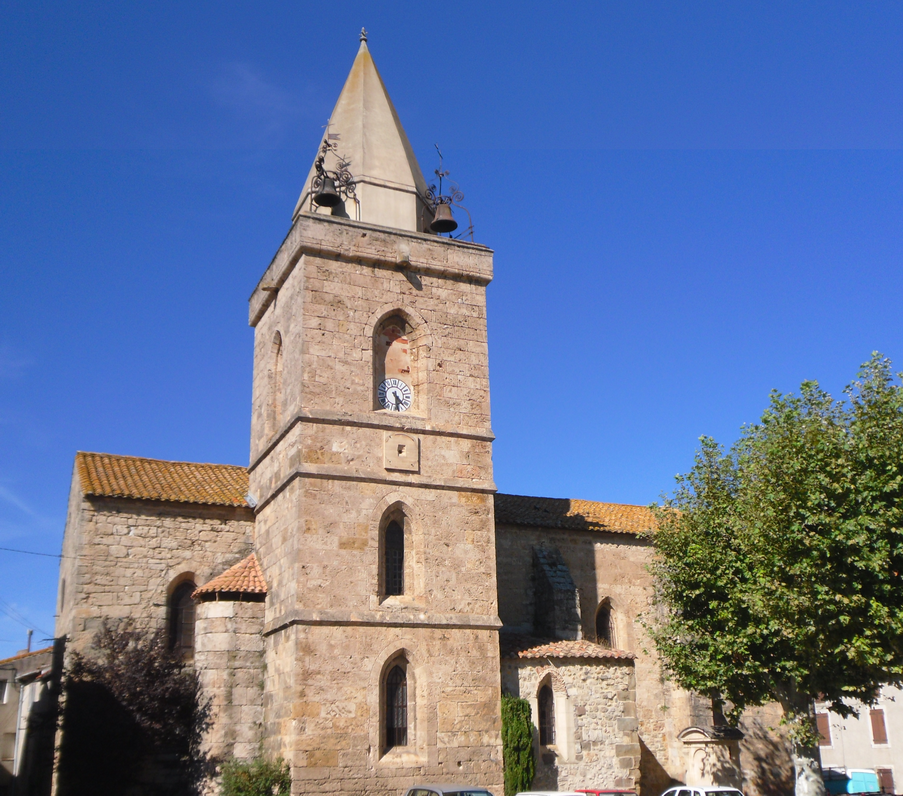
- The church in Canet

- Coat of arms
- Location of Canet
- Location within France Location within Occitanie
- Coordinates: 43°13′47″N 2°50′52″E
- Country: France
- Region: Occitania
- Department: Aude
- Arrondissement: Narbonne
- Canton: Le Sud-Minervois
- Intercommunality: Région Lézignanaise, Corbières et Minervois

Government
  - Mayor (2020–2026): André Hernandez
- Area^{1}: 14.04 km^{2} (5.42 sq mi)
- Elevation: 30 m (98 ft)
- Highest elevation: 37 m (121 ft)
- Lowest elevation: 18 m (59 ft)
- Population (2023): 1,873
  - Density: 133.4/km^{2} (345.5/sq mi)
- Time zone: UTC+01:00 (CET)
  - Summer (DST): UTC+02:00 (CEST)
- INSEE/Postal code: 11067 /11200
- ^{1} French Land Register data, which excludes lakes, ponds, glaciers > 1 km^{2} (0.386 sq mi or 247 acres) and river estuaries.

Canet (French pronunciation: [kanɛ(t)]; Occitan: Canet d'Aude) is a commune in the Aude department in southern France.

== Population ==
Historical population
Year	Pop.	±% p.a.
1968	1,030	—
1975	910	−1.75%
1982	837	−1.19%
1990	939	+1.45%
1999	1,072	+1.48%
2007	1,224	+1.67%
2012	1,546	+4.78%
2017	1,778	+2.84%
2023	1,873	+0.87%
Source: INSEE

== See also ==
- Corbières AOC
- Communes of the Aude department
