= Pont Serme =

- Coordinates: 43.273889°N 3.050833°E
- Carries: Via Domitia
- Crosses: Etang de Capestang
- Locale: Near Béziers, Hérault, France

Characteristics
- Total length: Ca. 1500 m

The Pont Serme or Pons Selinus, later called the Pons Septimus, was a Roman bridge of the Via Domitia in the Aude department, commune of Coursan, Occitania southern France. The approximately 1500 m long viaduct crossed the wide marshes of the Aude River and the Etang de Capestang west of Béziers, surpassing in length even the Trajan's Bridge over the Danube. Today, few traces remain of the viaduct, other than its name, which has passed over to a nearby wine-estate called "Domaine de Pontserme "

== See also ==
- List of Roman bridges
- Roman architecture
- Roman engineering

== Sources ==
- O’Connor, Colin (1993), Roman Bridges, Cambridge University Press, pp. 99 (G12), ISBN 0-521-39326-4
