= Canton of Le Sud-Minervois =

Coordinates: 43.26°N 2.95°E

- Canton
- Situation of the canton of Le Sud-Minervois in the department of Aude
- Country: France
- Region: Occitania
- Department: Aude
- No. of communes: {{{nbcomm}}}
- Population (2023): 24,977
- INSEE code: 1116

The canton of Le Sud-Minervois is an administrative division of the Aude department, southern France. It was created at the French canton reorganisation which came into effect in March 2015. Its seat is in Sallèles-d'Aude.

It consists of the following communes:

1. Argeliers
2. Bize-Minervois
3. Canet
4. Ginestas
5. Mailhac
6. Marcorignan
7. Mirepeisset
8. Moussan
9. Ouveillan
10. Paraza
11. Pouzols-Minervois
12. Raissac-d'Aude
13. Roubia
14. Sainte-Valière
15. Saint-Marcel-sur-Aude
16. Saint-Nazaire-d'Aude
17. Sallèles-d'Aude
18. Ventenac-en-Minervois
