= Capestang =

- Commune
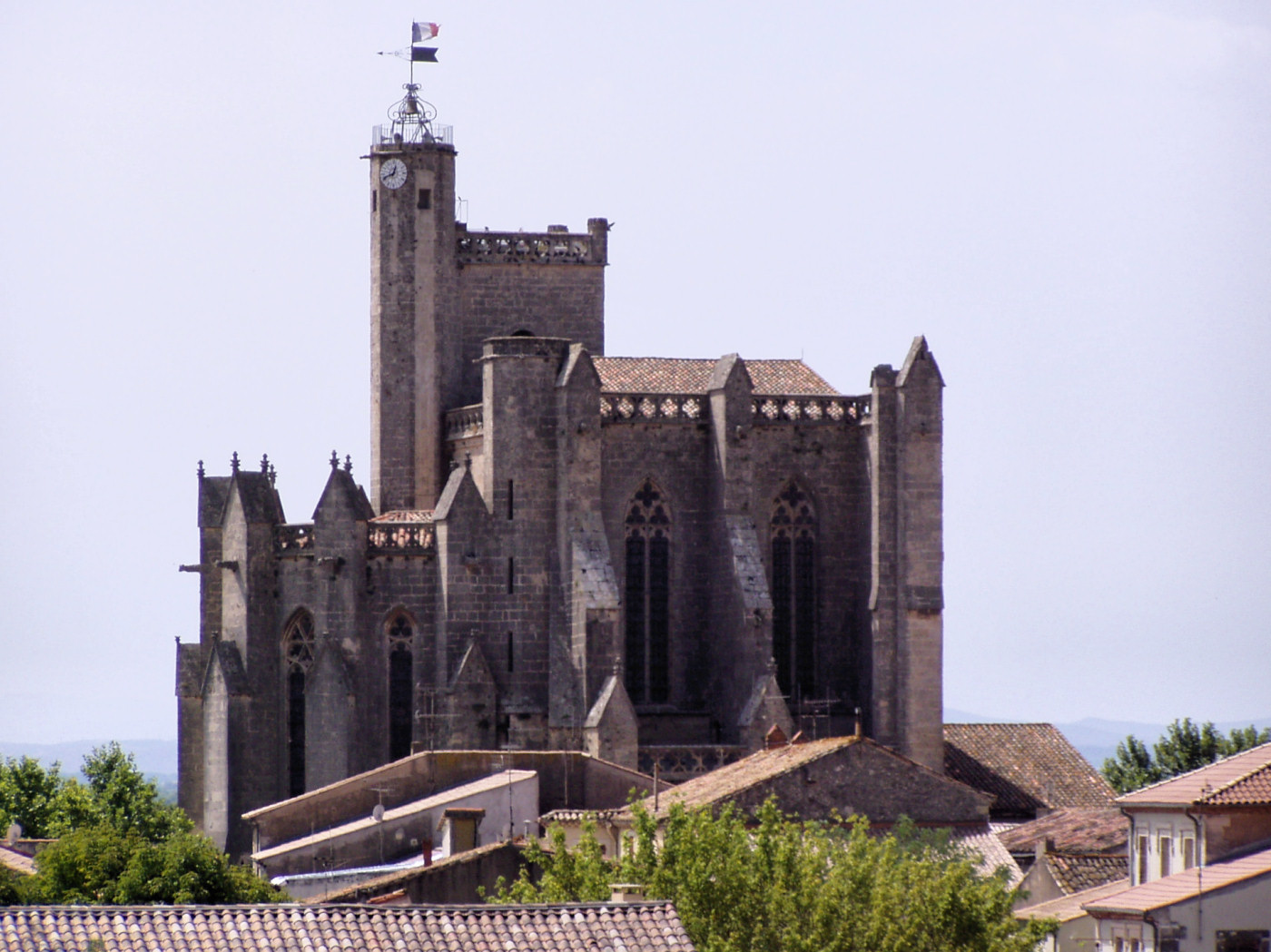
- Collegiate Church

- Coat of arms
- Location of Capestang
- Location within France Location within Occitanie
- Coordinates: 43°19′47″N 3°02′43″E
- Country: France
- Region: Occitania
- Department: Hérault
- Arrondissement: Béziers
- Canton: Saint-Pons-de-Thomières

Government
  - Mayor (2020–2026): Pierre Polard
- Area^{1}: 39.56 km^{2} (15.27 sq mi)
- Elevation: 12 m (39 ft)
- Highest elevation: 120 m (390 ft)
- Lowest elevation: 0 m (0 ft)
- Population (2023): 3,514
  - Density: 88.83/km^{2} (230.1/sq mi)
- Time zone: UTC+01:00 (CET)
  - Summer (DST): UTC+02:00 (CEST)
- INSEE/Postal code: 34052 /34310
- ^{1} French Land Register data, which excludes lakes, ponds, glaciers > 1 km^{2} (0.386 sq mi or 247 acres) and river estuaries.

Capestang (French pronunciation: [kapɛstɑ̃]; Occitan: Cabestanh) is a commune in the Hérault department in southern France.

== History ==
In antiquity, the nearby marshes were crossed by the 1500-metre-long Roman Pont Serme. The bridge carried the Via Domitia as it neared Narbonne on its southward strategic journey to Spain. The town's name derives from Latin: caput stagnum - referring to the fact that the town sat at the head of a large étang (a large natural saline and shallow lake - very common in the area and the source of wealth and sustenance - salt, fish, game birds).

The Archbishops of Narbonne built their summer residence in the town - substantial vestiges remain, especially of the palace wherein a 15th-century ceiling - and there is an impressive collegiate church (12th to 15th centuries with earlier vestiges) whose massive tower dominates the surrounding countryside to this day.

The canal du Midi also passes just to the north of the town as it winds its way from the Aude into the Hérault.

The crusading armies passed the town after the sack of Béziers in 1209 en route for Carcassonne - and in 1356 Edward the Black Prince reached the eastern extreme of his extensive chevauchée, having raised the short siege of Narbonne, where he burned the bourg, and having allowed his troops to damage the neighbouring village of Ouveillan. Capestang, like Cuxac-d'Aude and other villages, may have paid to be spared the fate of Ouveillan - or it may have had more robust defences or have been saved by intelligence of the impending arrival of a large army coming from Beaucaire.

There is a plaque in the square to resistance hostages shot by the SS on 9 August, 1944, three days after D-Day.

== Population ==
Historical population

Year	Pop.	±% p.a.
1793	1,150	—
1800	1,185	+0.43%
1806	1,360	+2.32%
1821	1,530	+0.79%
1831	1,624	+0.60%
1836	1,893	+3.11%
1841	1,933	+0.42%
1846	2,039	+1.07%
1851	2,135	+0.92%
1856	2,331	+1.77%
1861	2,746	+3.33%
1866	2,999	+1.78%
1872	2,909	−0.51%
1876	3,176	+2.22%
1881	3,737	+3.31%
1886	3,519	−1.19%
1891	4,076	+2.98%
1896	4,168	+0.45%
1901	4,187	+0.09%

Year	Pop.	±% p.a.
1906	4,012	−0.85%
1911	4,010	−0.01%
1921	4,053	+0.11%
1926	4,028	−0.12%
1931	4,039	+0.05%
1936	3,541	−2.60%
1946	2,962	−1.77%
1954	2,763	−0.87%
1962	3,019	+1.11%
1968	3,014	−0.03%
1975	2,548	−2.37%
1982	2,675	+0.70%
1990	2,903	+1.03%
1999	3,007	+0.39%
2007	3,010	+0.01%
2012	3,111	+0.66%
2017	3,233	+0.77%
2023	3,514	+1.40%

Source: EHESS and INSEE (1968–2023)

== See also ==
- Communes of the Hérault department
- Capestang bridge
