= Sallèles-d'Aude =

Commune in Occitanie, France

- Commune
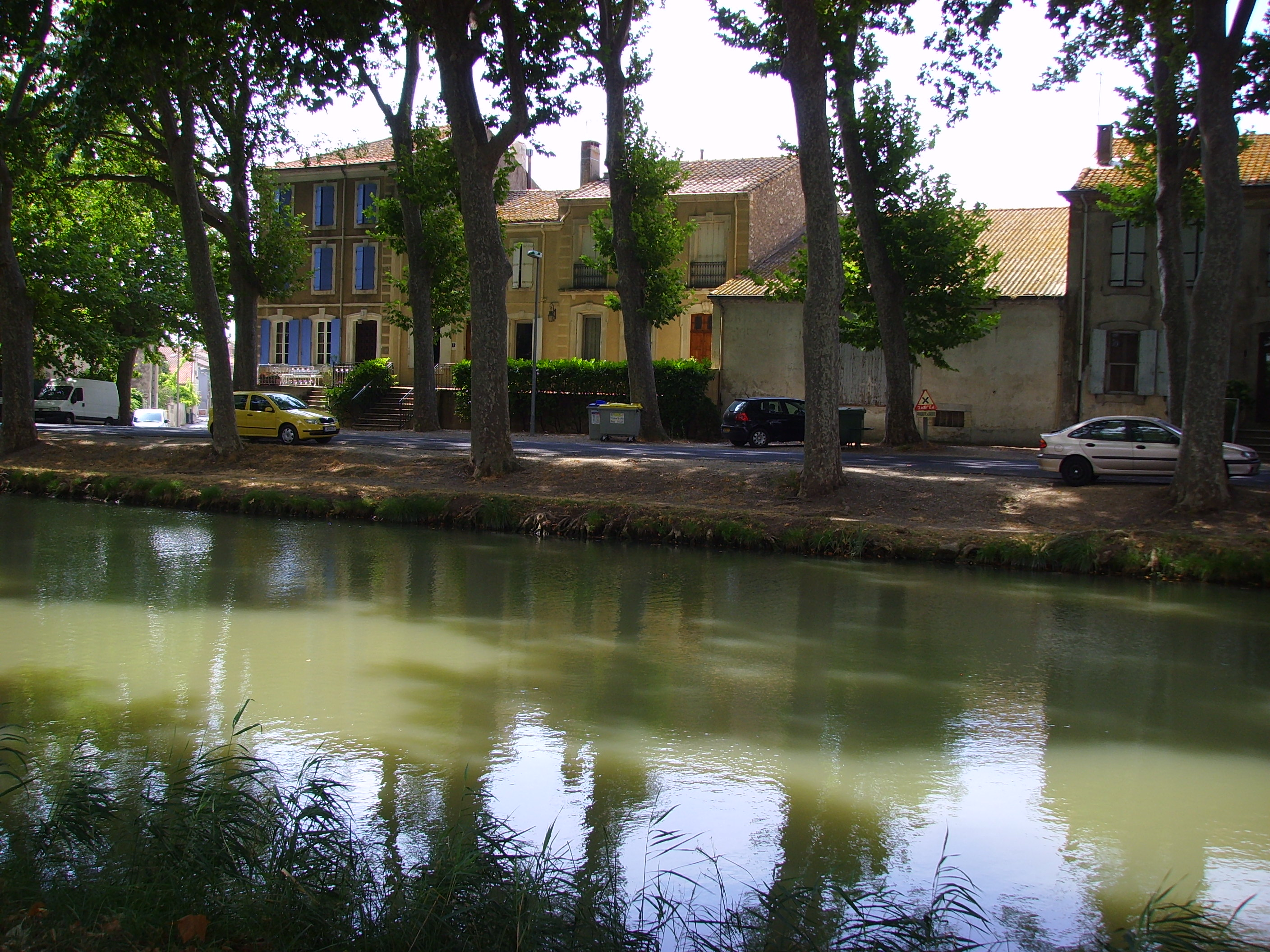
- The Canal de Jonction in Sallèles-d'Aude

- Coat of arms
- Location of Sallèles-d'Aude
- Location within France Location within Occitanie
- Coordinates: 43°15′36″N 2°56′48″E
- Country: France
- Region: Occitania
- Department: Aude
- Arrondissement: Narbonne
- Canton: Le Sud-Minervois
- Intercommunality: Grand Narbonne

Government
  - Mayor (2020–2026): Yves Bastié
- Area^{1}: 12.55 km^{2} (4.85 sq mi)
- Elevation: 18 m (59 ft)
- Highest elevation: 46 m (151 ft)
- Lowest elevation: 8 m (26 ft)
- Population (2023): 3,179
  - Density: 253.3/km^{2} (656.1/sq mi)
- Time zone: UTC+01:00 (CET)
  - Summer (DST): UTC+02:00 (CEST)
- INSEE/Postal code: 11369 /11590
- ^{1} French Land Register data, which excludes lakes, ponds, glaciers > 1 km^{2} (0.386 sq mi or 247 acres) and river estuaries.

Sallèles-d'Aude (French pronunciation: [salɛl dod]; Occitan: Salèlas d'Aude) is a commune in the Aude department in southern France. The Canal de Jonction, part of the La Nouvelle branch of the Canal du Midi, runs through the middle of the town.

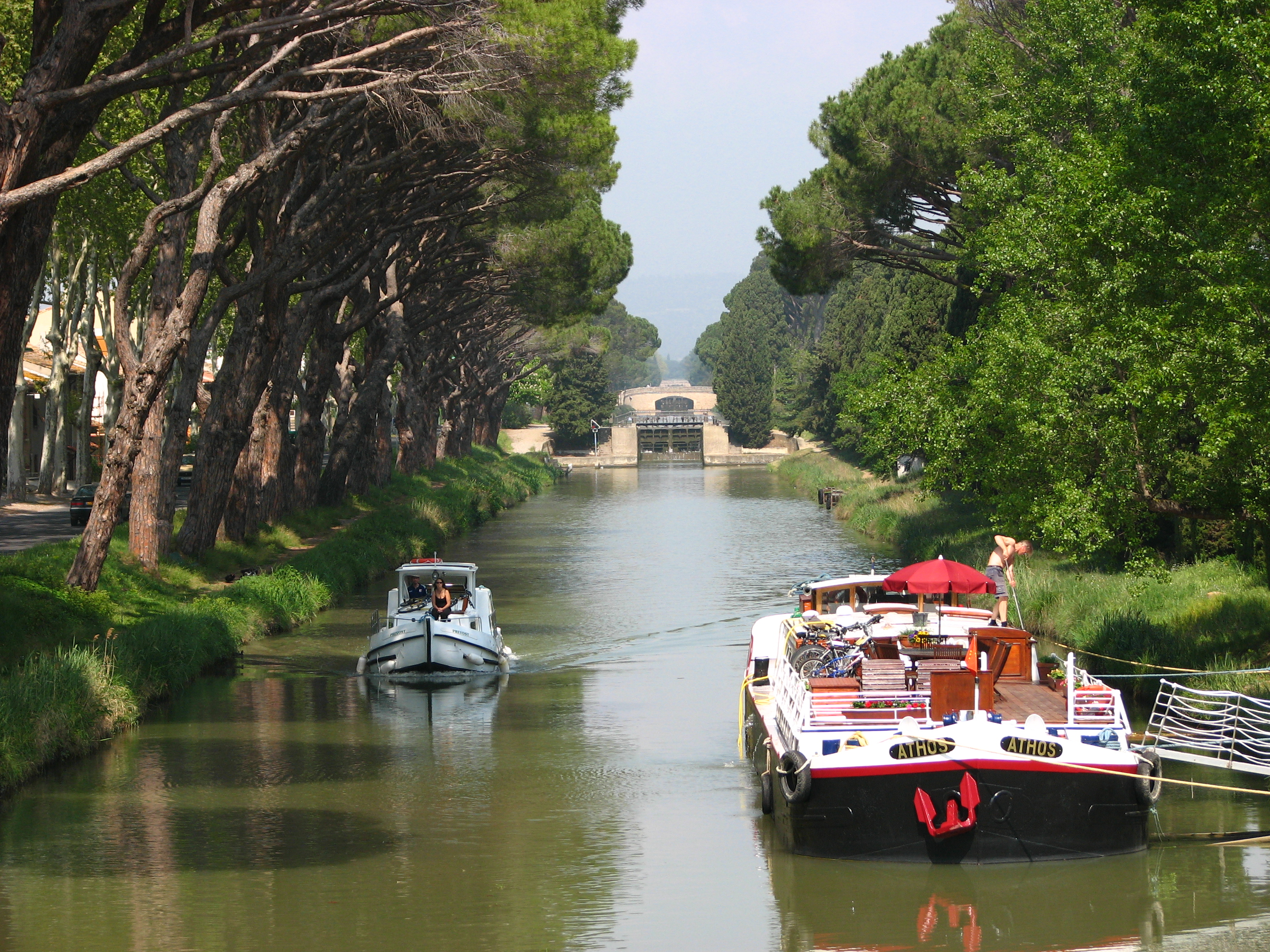
Canal de Jonction at Sallèles d'Aude

== Population ==
Historical population
Year	Pop.	±% p.a.
1968	1,801	—
1975	1,879	+0.61%
1982	1,842	−0.28%
1990	1,659	−1.30%
1999	1,835	+1.13%
2007	2,285	+2.78%
2012	2,759	+3.84%
2017	2,922	+1.15%
2023	3,179	+1.41%
Source: INSEE

== See also ==
- Communes of the Aude department
- Le Somail
