= Saint-Nazaire-d'Aude =

Commune in Occitanie, France

- Commune
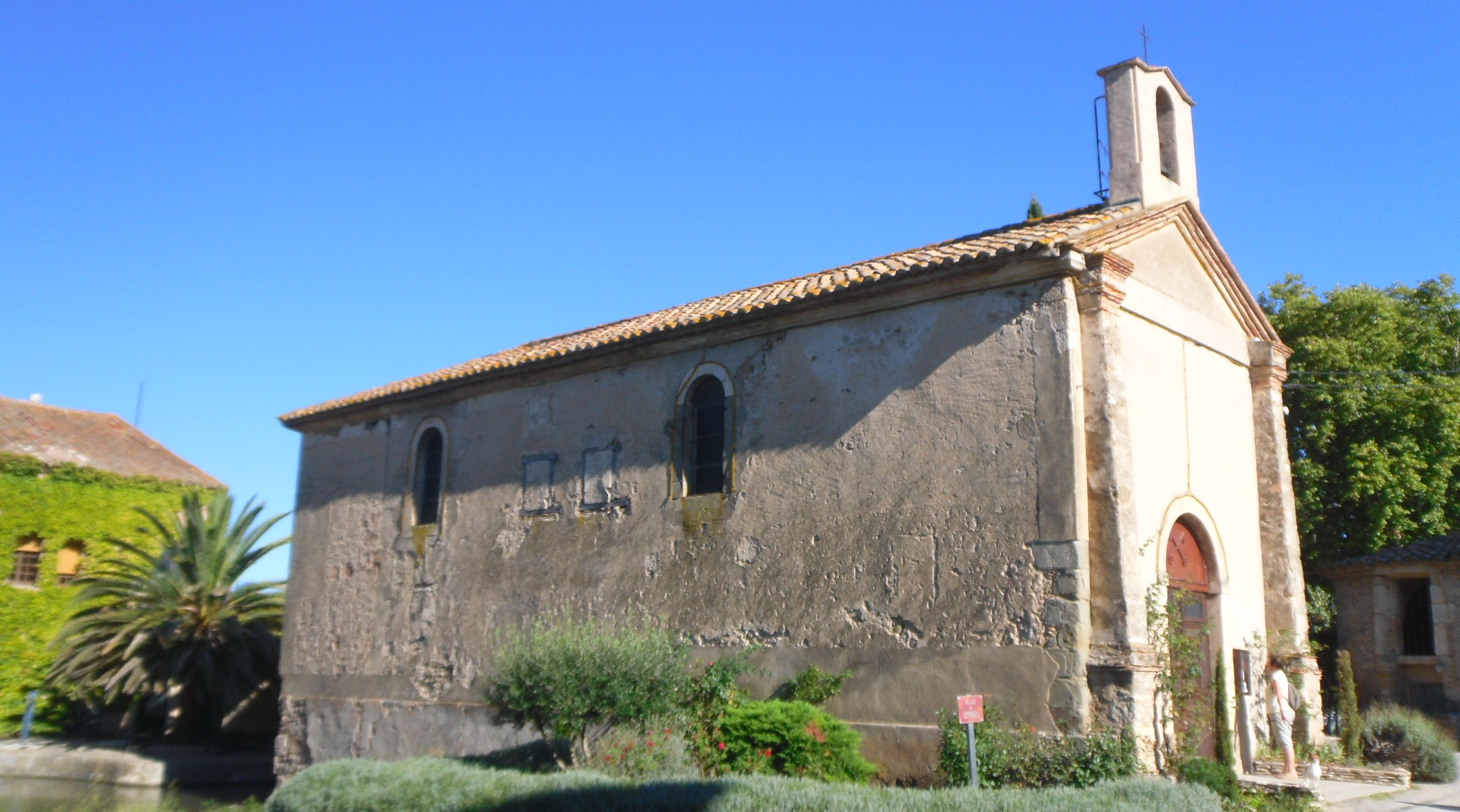
- Church in hamlet of Le Somail

- Coat of arms
- Location of Saint-Nazaire-d'Aude
- Location within France Location within Occitanie
- Coordinates: 43°14′43″N 2°53′41″E
- Country: France
- Region: Occitania
- Department: Aude
- Arrondissement: Narbonne
- Canton: Le Sud-Minervois
- Intercommunality: Grand Narbonne

Government
  - Mayor (2020–2026): Joël Hernandez
- Area^{1}: 8.63 km^{2} (3.33 sq mi)
- Elevation: 33 m (108 ft)
- Highest elevation: 62 m (203 ft)
- Lowest elevation: 14 m (46 ft)
- Population (2023): 2,118
  - Density: 245/km^{2} (636/sq mi)
- Time zone: UTC+01:00 (CET)
  - Summer (DST): UTC+02:00 (CEST)
- INSEE/Postal code: 11360 /11120
- ^{1} French Land Register data, which excludes lakes, ponds, glaciers > 1 km^{2} (0.386 sq mi or 247 acres) and river estuaries.

Saint-Nazaire-d'Aude (French: [sɛ̃ nazɛːʁ dod]; Occitan: Sant Nazari d'Aude) is a commune in the Aude department in southern France.

== Population ==
Historical population
Year	Pop.	±% p.a.
1968	703	—
1975	718	+0.30%
1982	854	+2.51%
1990	936	+1.15%
1999	1,113	+1.94%
2007	1,703	+5.46%
2012	1,838	+1.54%
2017	2,032	+2.03%
2023	2,118	+0.69%
Source: INSEE

== See also ==
- Le Somail
- Communes of the Aude department
