= Ouveillan =

Commune in Occitanie, France

- Commune
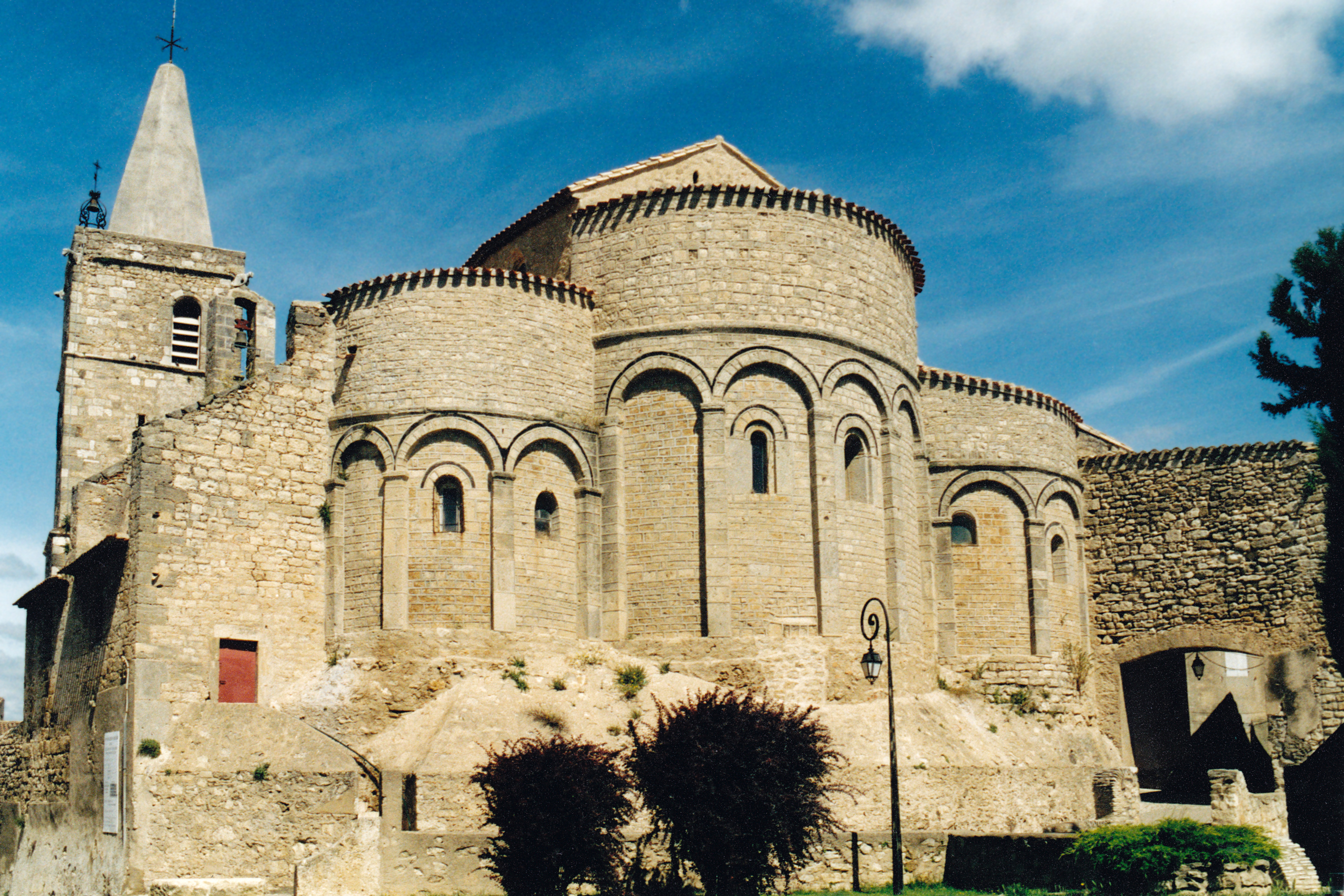
- The church in Ouveillan

- Coat of arms
- Location of Ouveillan
- Location within France Location within Occitanie
- Coordinates: 43°17′21″N 2°58′20″E
- Country: France
- Region: Occitania
- Department: Aude
- Arrondissement: Narbonne
- Canton: Le Sud-Minervois
- Intercommunality: Grand Narbonne

Government
  - Mayor (2023–2026): Jean-Antoine Villegas
- Area^{1}: 29.98 km^{2} (11.58 sq mi)
- Elevation: 20 m (66 ft)
- Highest elevation: 59 m (194 ft)
- Lowest elevation: 6 m (20 ft)
- Population (2023): 2,713
  - Density: 90.49/km^{2} (234.4/sq mi)
- Time zone: UTC+01:00 (CET)
  - Summer (DST): UTC+02:00 (CEST)
- INSEE/Postal code: 11269 /11590
- ^{1} French Land Register data, which excludes lakes, ponds, glaciers > 1 km^{2} (0.386 sq mi or 247 acres) and river estuaries.

Ouveillan (French pronunciation: [uvɛjɑ̃]; Occitan: Auvelhan) is a commune in the Aude department in southern France.

Sights include the church of St. John the Evangelist, built in Romanesque style during the 11th-12th centuries. It has a large choir area with three apses, which are decorated externally with Lombard bands.

== Population ==
Historical population
Year	Pop.	±% p.a.
1968	1,921	—
1975	1,888	−0.25%
1982	1,861	−0.21%
1990	1,882	+0.14%
1999	1,913	+0.18%
2007	2,139	+1.41%
2012	2,300	+1.46%
2017	2,463	+1.38%
2023	2,713	+1.62%
Source: INSEE

== See also ==
- Communes of the Aude department
