= Pouzols-Minervois =

Commune in Occitanie, France

- Commune
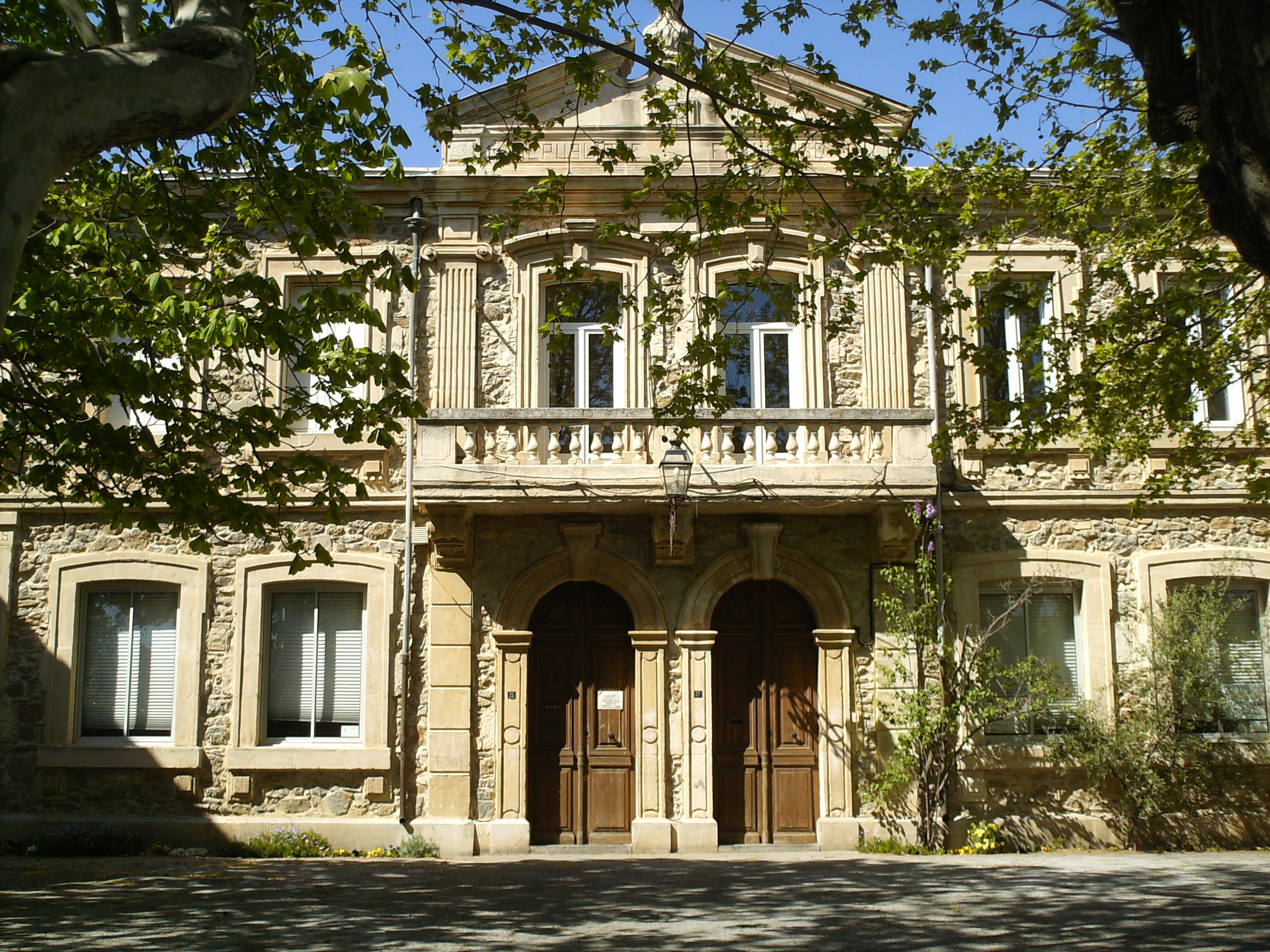
- Town hall

- Coat of arms
- Location of Pouzols-Minervois
- Location within France Location within Occitanie
- Coordinates: 43°17′14″N 2°49′30″E
- Country: France
- Region: Occitania
- Department: Aude
- Arrondissement: Narbonne
- Canton: Le Sud-Minervois
- Intercommunality: Grand Narbonne

Government
  - Mayor (2020–2026): Marcel Tubau
- Area^{1}: 10.15 km^{2} (3.92 sq mi)
- Highest elevation: 294 m (965 ft)
- Lowest elevation: 39 m (128 ft)
- Population (2023): 599
  - Density: 59.0/km^{2} (153/sq mi)
- Time zone: UTC+01:00 (CET)
  - Summer (DST): UTC+02:00 (CEST)
- INSEE/Postal code: 11296 /11120
- ^{1} French Land Register data, which excludes lakes, ponds, glaciers > 1 km^{2} (0.386 sq mi or 247 acres) and river estuaries.

Pouzols-Minervois is a commune in the Aude department in southern France.

== Population ==
Historical population
Year	Pop.	±% p.a.
1968	380	—
1975	321	−2.38%
1982	367	+1.93%
1990	338	−1.02%
1999	329	−0.30%
2007	364	+1.27%
2012	506	+6.81%
2017	547	+1.57%
2023	599	+1.53%
Source: INSEE

== See also ==
- Communes of the Aude department
