= Port-la-Nouvelle =

Commune in Occitanie, France

- Commune
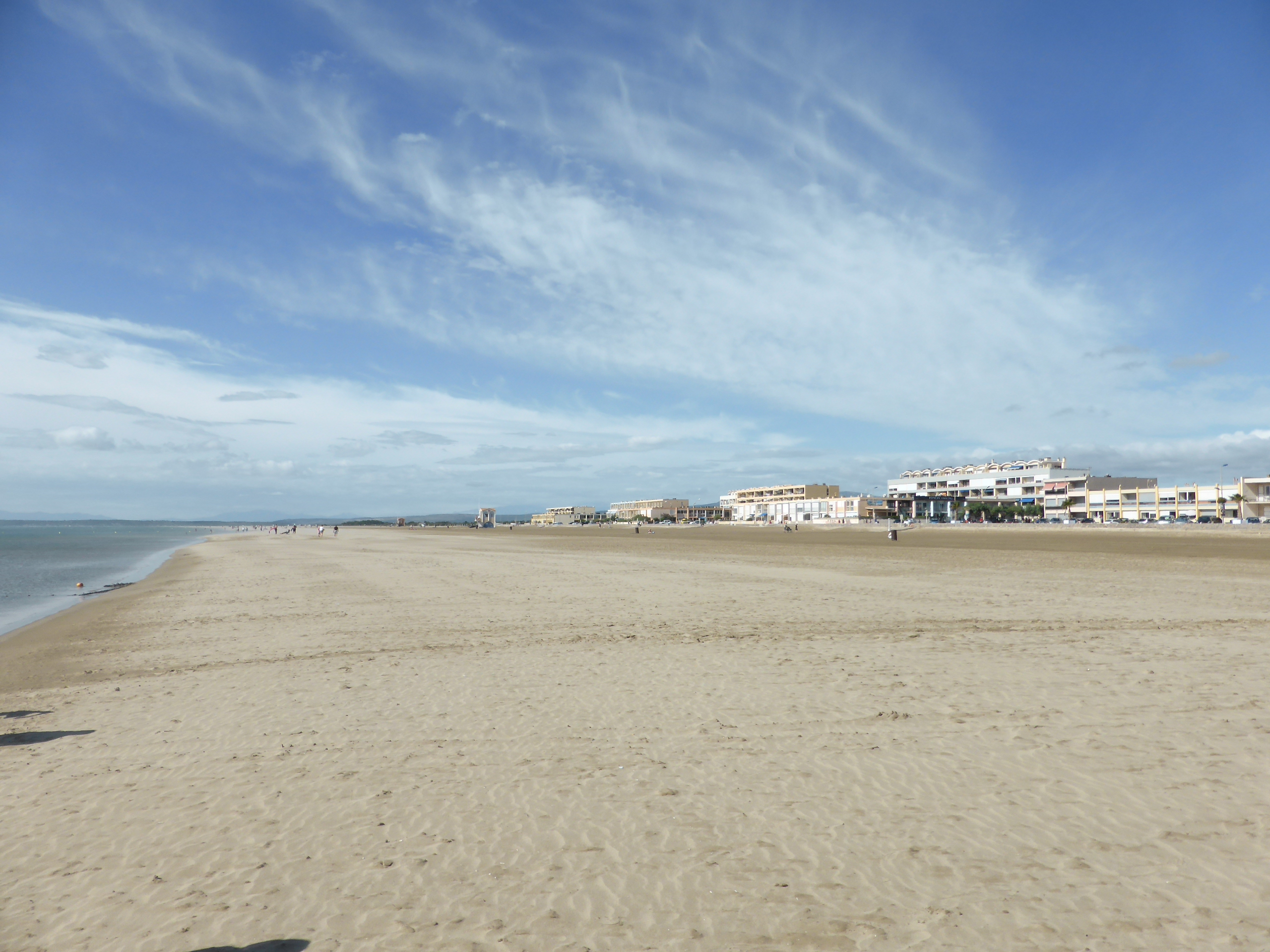
- The beach at Port-la-Nouvelle

- Coat of arms
- Location of Port-la-Nouvelle
- Location within France Location within Occitanie
- Coordinates: 43°01′12″N 03°02′46″E
- Country: France
- Region: Occitania
- Department: Aude
- Arrondissement: Narbonne
- Canton: Les Corbières Méditerranée
- Intercommunality: Grand Narbonne

Government
  - Mayor (2020–2026): Henri Martin (DVD)
- Area^{1}: 28.55 km^{2} (11.02 sq mi)
- Elevation: 2 m (6.6 ft)
- Highest elevation: 133 m (436 ft)
- Lowest elevation: 0 m (0 ft)
- Population (2023): 5,852
  - Density: 205.0/km^{2} (530.9/sq mi)
- Time zone: UTC+01:00 (CET)
  - Summer (DST): UTC+02:00 (CEST)
- INSEE/Postal code: 11266 /11210
- ^{1} French Land Register data, which excludes lakes, ponds, glaciers > 1 km^{2} (0.386 sq mi or 247 acres) and river estuaries.

Port-la-Nouvelle (French pronunciation: [pɔʁ la nuvɛl]; Occitan: La Novèla, before 1953: La Nouvelle) is a port town in the Aude department in southern France. It serves as a major port for the Occitania region in South west France.

== Population ==
Historical population
Year	Pop.	±% p.a.
1968	3,938	—
1975	4,554	+2.10%
1982	4,410	−0.46%
1990	4,822	+1.12%
1999	4,859	+0.08%
2007	5,541	+1.66%
2012	5,653	+0.40%
2017	5,567	−0.31%
2023	5,852	+0.84%
Source: INSEE

== See also ==
- Communes of the Aude department
- Corbières AOC
