= Mirepeisset =

Commune in Occitanie, France

- Commune
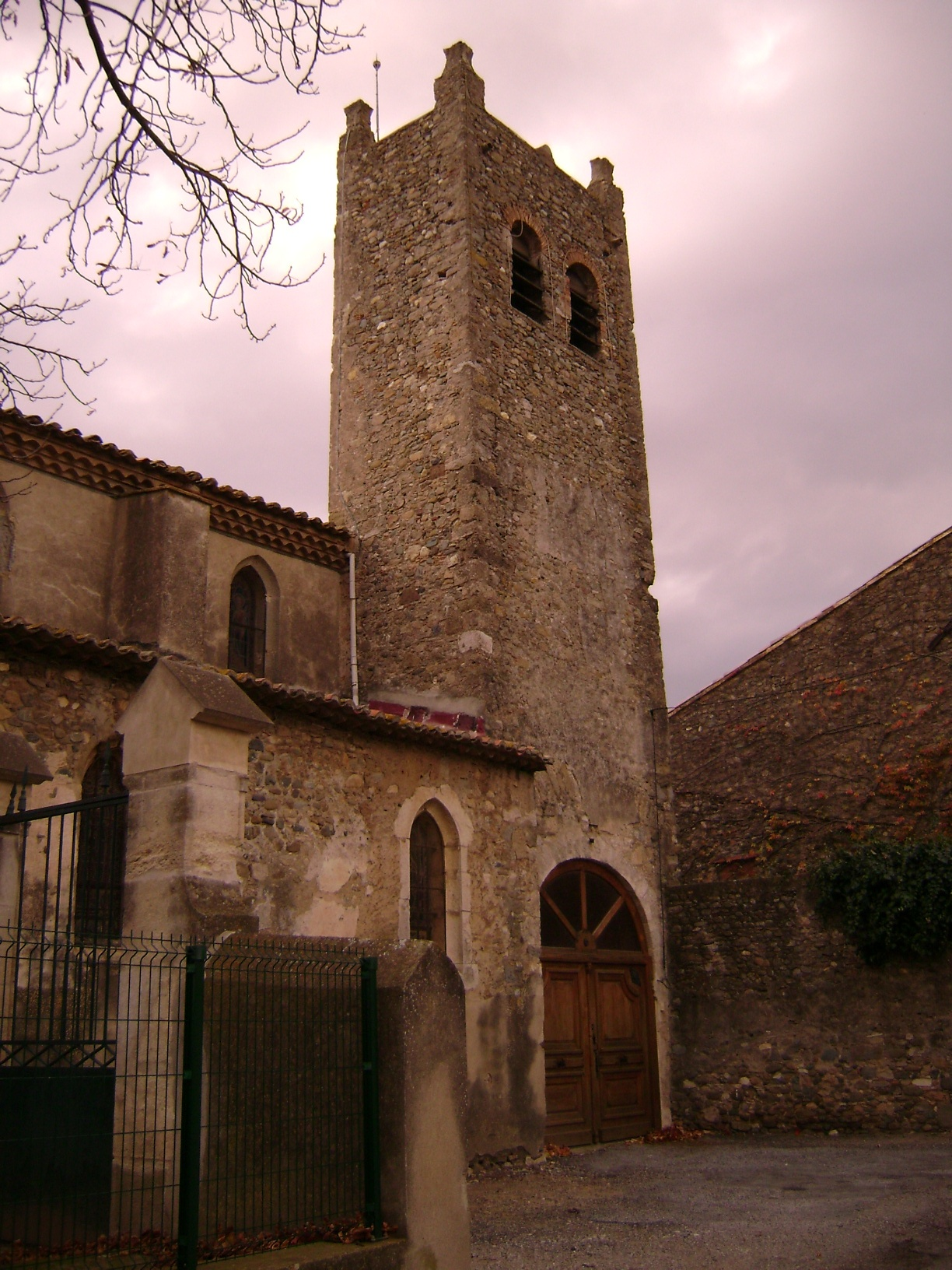
- The church in Mirepeisset

- Coat of arms
- Location of Mirepeisset
- Location within France Location within Occitanie
- Coordinates: 43°17′10″N 2°53′51″E
- Country: France
- Region: Occitania
- Department: Aude
- Arrondissement: Narbonne
- Canton: Le Sud-Minervois
- Intercommunality: Grand Narbonne

Government
  - Mayor (2020–2026): Fabienne Martinage
- Area^{1}: 5.19 km^{2} (2.00 sq mi)
- Elevation: 37 m (121 ft)
- Highest elevation: 47 m (154 ft)
- Lowest elevation: 26 m (85 ft)
- Population (2023): 750
  - Density: 140/km^{2} (370/sq mi)
- Time zone: UTC+01:00 (CET)
  - Summer (DST): UTC+02:00 (CEST)
- INSEE/Postal code: 11233 /11120
- ^{1} French Land Register data, which excludes lakes, ponds, glaciers > 1 km^{2} (0.386 sq mi or 247 acres) and river estuaries.

Mirepeisset (French pronunciation: [miʁpesɛ]; Occitan: Mirapeisset) is a commune in the Aude department in southern France.

== Population ==
Historical population
Year	Pop.	±% p.a.
1968	359	—
1975	326	−1.37%
1982	324	−0.09%
1990	410	+2.99%
1999	451	+1.06%
2007	738	+6.35%
2012	780	+1.11%
2017	769	−0.28%
2023	750	−0.42%
Source: INSEE

== See also ==
- Communes of the Aude department
