= Le Somail =

Coordinates: 43°15′54″N 2°54′29″E

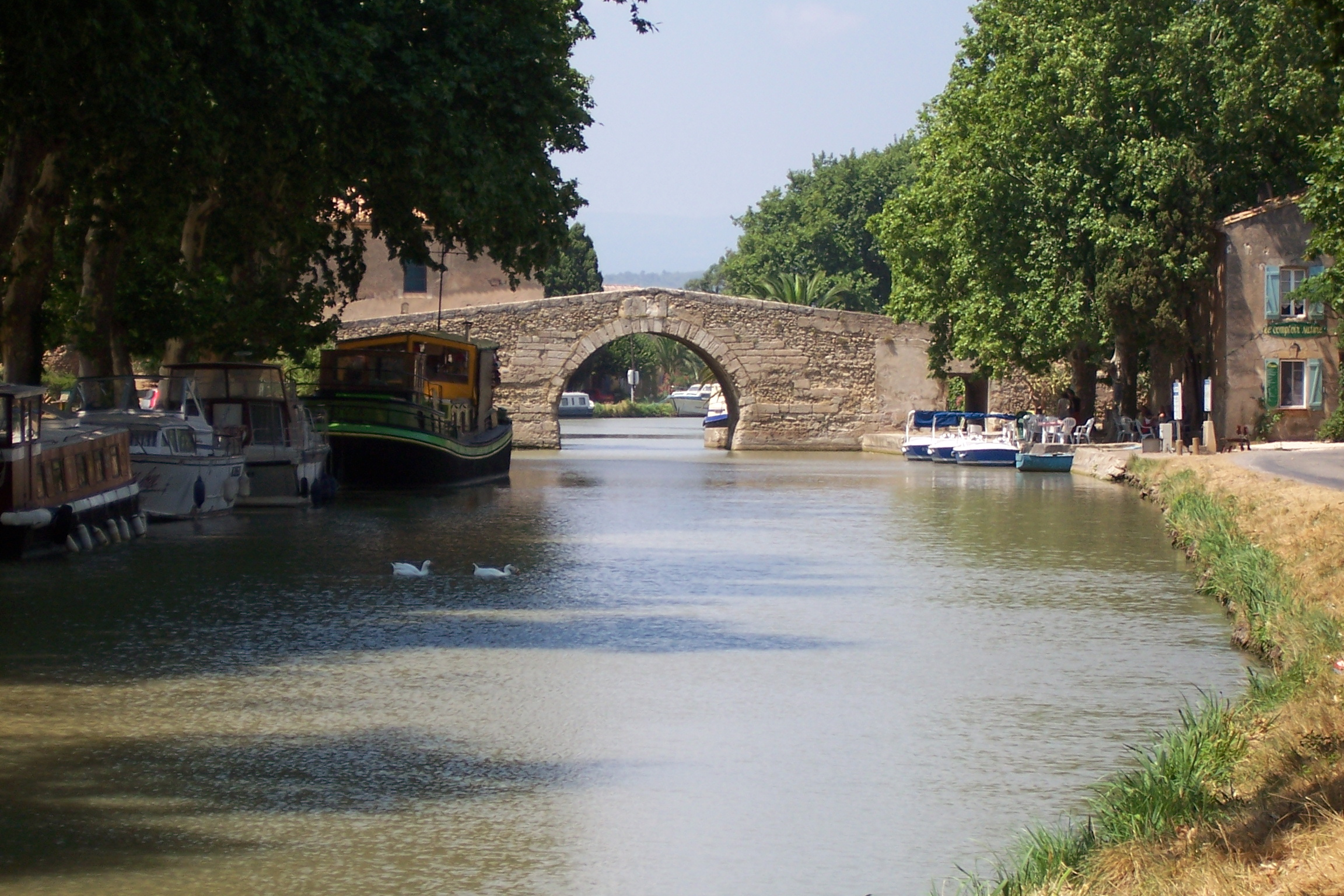
The 17th century Saint-Marcel bridge in Le Somail

Le Somail (French pronunciation: [lə sɔmaj]) is a hamlet in the Aude department of southwestern France. Le Somail is located along the Canal du Midi. Its territory is shared by 3 communes: Ginestas, Saint-Nazaire-d'Aude and Sallèles-d'Aude.

== History ==
In the 17th century, the town was the resting place for passengers on the mail barge operating between Toulouse and Agde.
