= Alain Madalle =

French politician (1937–2024)

Deputy of the French National Assembly for Aude's 2nd constituency
- In office 2 April 1993 – 21 April 1997
- Preceded by: Régis Barailla
- Succeeded by: Jacques Bascou

Member of the General Council of Aude for the Canton of Narbonne-Sud
- In office 1986–1992
- Preceded by: Hubert Mouly
- Succeeded by: Michel Moynier

Personal details
- Born: 25 February 1937 Saint-Nazaire-de-Ladarez, France
- Died: 2 November 2024 (aged 87) Nîmes, France
- Party: RPR
- Occupation: Schoolteacher

Alain Madalle (25 February 1937 – 2 November 2024) was a French schoolteacher and politician of the Rally for the Republic (RPR).

Madalle worked as a secondary schoolteacher in Narbonne and was secretary of the RPR in the department of Aude. From 1993 to 1997, he served in the National Assembly in Aude's 2nd constituency and was deputy mayor of Narbonne from 1971 to 1995.

Madalle died on 2 November 2024, at the age of 87.

== Decorations ==
- Knight of the Legion of Honour (1999)
- Officer of the Ordre des Palmes académiques

== See also ==
- List of deputies of the 10th National Assembly of France
