= Mireille =

Mireille (French: [miʁɛj]) is a French given name, derived from the Provençal Occitan name Mirèio (or Mirèlha in the classical norm of Occitan, pronounced [miˈɾɛjɔ, miˈɾɛʎɔ]). It could be related to the Occitan verb mirar "to look, to admire" or to the given names Miriam "Myriam", Maria "Mary". It is uncommon in France, except in families originating from Provence and around the Mediterranean sea. Notable people with the name include:

- Mireille Balin (1909–1968), French actress
- Mireille Chinain, marine scientist from French Polynesia
- Mireille Darc (1938–2017), French model and actress
- Mireille Delunsch (born 1962), French operatic soprano
- Mireille Enos (born 1975), American actress
- Mireille Gingras (born 1971), Canadian-American neurobiologist and entrepreneur
- Mireille Guiliano (born 1946), French-American author
- Mireille Hartuch (1906–1996), French singer and composer, known by the stage name "Mireille"
- Mireille Johnston (1935–2000), French-American cook and author
- Mireille Mathieu (born 1946), French singer
- Mireille Nguimgo (born 1976), Cameroonian sprinter
- Mireille Perrier (born 1959), French actress
- Mireille Richard (born 1989), Swiss ski mountaineer
- Mireille Robert (born 1963), French politician
- Mireille Roccatti, Mexican scholar and jurist
- Mireille Soria, American film producer

== Fictional characters ==
- Mireille, in the anime/manga series .hack//Legend of the Twilight
- Mireille Belleau, the central character in the French language program French in Action, played by Valérie Allain
- Mireille Bouquet, in the anime series Noir
- Mireille Caquet, in the animated series Miraculous Ladybug
- Mireille Duval Jameson, in An Untamed State by Roxane Gay
