= Aude's 2nd constituency =

Constituency of the National Assembly of France

2nd constituency of Aude
- inline Constituency of the National Assembly of France

- The three constituencies of Aude

- Aude in France
- Deputy: Frédéric Falcon; RN
- Department: Aude
- Cantons: Coursan, Narbonne-Est, Narbonne-Ouest, Narbonne-Sud, Sigean
- Registered voters: 151,209

The 2nd constituency of Aude is a French legislative constituency in the Aude département.

It is located in the east of the Department running from north to south, including the Mediterranean coast, centred on the town of Narbonne.

== Deputies ==
Election	Member	Party
1988	Régis Barailla	PS
1993	Alain Madalle	RPR
1997	Jacques Bascou	PS
2002	Jacques Bascou	PS
2007	Jacques Bascou	PS
2012	Marie-Hélène Fabre	PS
2017	Alain Péréa	LREM
2022	Frédéric Falcon	RN
2024	Frédéric Falcon	RN

== Election results ==
=== 2024 ===
Candidate	Party	Alliance	First round			Second round		
Candidate	Party	Alliance	Votes	%	+/–	Votes	%	+/–
Frédéric Falcon	RN		29,212	48.12	+19.99	33,573	58.22	+5.69
Viviane Thivent	LE	NFP	15,795	26.02	+5.08	24,092	41.78	new
Christine Breyton	RE	Ensemble	11,727	19.32	-2.67	withdrew		
Gérard Lenfant	RES!		1,927	3.17	+1.06			
Alain Peyre	REC		969	1.60	-2.98			
Alain Brun	DVD		654	1.08	new			
Annette Vigier	LO		418	0.69	+0.05			
Nicole Grau	DIV		0	0.00	new			
Votes			60,702	100.00		57,665	100.00	
Valid votes			60,702	96.47	-1.55	57,665	91.37	+1.12
Blank votes			1,312	2.09	+0.66	3,952	6.26	-0.84
Null votes			910	1.45	+0.90	1,492	2.36	-0.29
Turnout			62,924	67.78	+19.37	63,109	67.97	+20.80
Abstentions			29,908	32.22	-19.37	29,737	32.03	-20.80
Registered voters			92,832			92,846		
Result			RN HOLD					

=== 2022 ===
Legislative Election 2022: Aude's 2nd constituency
Party	Candidate	Votes	%	±%
RN	Frédéric Falcon	12,365	28.13	+8.35
LREM (Ensemble)	Alain Perea	9,666	21.99	-5.33
EELV (NUPÉS)	Viviane Thivent	9,204	20.94	−10.16
LC (UDC)	Quentin Estrade	3,706	8.43	−7.51
PRG	Edouard Rocher	3,303	7.52	N/A
REC	Jean-François Daraud	2,015	4.58	N/A
DVD	Gerard Lenfant	927	2.11	N/A
Others	N/A	2,766	6.29	
Turnout		43,952	48.41	−1.23
2nd round result
RN	Frédéric Falcon	20,719	52.53	+10.99
LREM (Ensemble)	Alain Perea	18,724	47.47	−10.99
Turnout		39,443	47.17	+4.20
RN gain from LREM				

=== 2017 ===
Candidate	Label	First round		Second round	
Candidate	Label	Votes	%	Votes	%
Alain Péréa	REM	11,729	27.32	19,381	58.46
Jean-François Daraud	FN	8,492	19.78	13,774	41.54
Michel Py	LR	6,842	15.94		
Marie-Hélène Fabre	PS	5,786	13.48		
Jean-Hugues Silberman	FI	5,244	12.21		
Xavier Verdejo	PCF	1,296	3.02		
Marie-Laure Arripe	ECO	1,025	2.39		
André Jacques	DLF	586	1.36		
Laurence Funès	EXD	493	1.15		
Gérard Lenfant	DVD	305	0.71		
Renaud Laus	DVG	280	0.65		
Annette Vigier	EXG	229	0.53		
Pierre Martinez	DIV	224	0.52		
Maximilien Faivre	EXD	143	0.33		
Dominique Coutard	DIV	133	0.31		
Jordan Pérello	DIV	128	0.30		
Aurore Debono	DVD	0	0.00		
Votes		42,935	100.00	33,155	100.00
Valid votes		42,935	97.28	33,155	86.79
Blank votes		864	1.96	3,459	9.05
Null votes		336	0.76	1,586	4.15
Turnout		44,135	49.64	38,200	42.97
Abstentions		44,767	50.36	50,698	57.03
Registered voters		88,902		88,898	
Source: Ministry of the Interior

=== 2012 ===
Summary of the 10 June and 17 June 2012 French legislative in Aude’s 2nd Constituency election results
Candidate	Party		1st round		2nd round	
Candidate	Party		Votes	%	Votes	%
Marie-Hélène Fabre	Socialist Party	PS	13,613	26.84%	26,262	56.83%
Michel Py	Union for a Popular Movement	UMP	11,738	23.14%	19,953	43.17%
Didier Codorniou	Miscellaneous Left	DVG	11,100	21.89%		
Laure-Emmanuelle Philippe	National Front	FN	9,536	18.80%		
Jean-Paul Tournissa	Left Front	FG	2,995	5.91%		
Laurence Funès	Far Right	EXD	373	0.74%		
Flora Biendicho	New Centre-Presidential Majority	NCE	295	0.58%		
Patricia Cantegrel	Miscellaneous Right	DVD	269	0.53%		
Paule Chatain	Miscellaneous Left	DVG	247	0.49%		
Laurent Billirat	Miscellaneous Left	DVG	196	0.39%		
André Sarfati	Ecologist	ECO	193	0.38%		
Annette Vigier	Far Left	EXG	161	0.32%		
Total			50,716	100%	46,215	100%
Registered voters			83,701		83,694	
Blank/Void ballots			865	1.68%	2,829	5.77%
Turnout			51,581	61.63%	49,044	58.60%
Abstentions			32,120	38.37%	34,650	41.40%
Result					PS HOLD	

=== 2007 ===
Summary of the 10 June and 17 June 2007 French legislative in Aude's 2nd Constituency election results
Candidate	Party		1st round		2nd round	
Candidate	Party		Votes	%	Votes	%
Jacques Bascou	Socialist Party	PS	26,098	37.61%	38,701	53.65%
Michel Py	Union for a Popular Movement	UMP	27,306	39.35%	33,432	46.35%
Jean-Pierre Nadal	National Front	FN	3,524	5.08%		
Patric Roux	Communist	COM	3,292	4.74%		
Alain Sohier	Democratic Movement	MoDem	2,969	4.28%		
Françis Schroeder	Far Left	EXG	1,737	2.50%		
Fabienne Decaens	The Greens	VEC	1,389	2.00%		
Hélène Escudie	Hunting, Fishing, Nature, Traditions	CPNT	1,101	1.59%		
Stéphane Imbert	Ecologist	ECO	610	0.88%		
André Cau	Far Right	EXD	438	0.63%		
Véronique Kontowicz	Far Left	EXG	353	0.51%		
Elise Carpentier	Majorité Présidentielle		353	0.51%		
Yannick Amiard	Far Left	EXG	223	0.32%		
Denis Verdier	Divers	DIV	0	0.00%		
Total			69,393	100%	72,133	100%
Registered voters			110,430		110,417	
Blank/Void ballots			1,402	1.98%	2,290	3.08%
Turnout			70,795	64.11%	74,423	67.40%
Abstentions			39,635	35.89%	35,994	32.60%
Result					PS HOLD	

=== 2002 ===
Legislative Election 2002: Aude's 2nd constituency
Party	Candidate	Votes	%	±%
PS	Jacques Bascou	24,424	37.13	
UMP	Michel Py	19,582	29.77	
FN	Danièle Beaudoin	10,296	15.65	
PCF	Christine Sanchez	3,942	5.99	
CPNT	Gérard Soulie	1,677	2.55	
Others	N/A	5,865		
Turnout		67,406	67.59	
2nd round result
PS	Jacques Bascou	34,244	55.91	
UMP	Michel Py	27,008	44.09	
Turnout		64,878	65.06	
PS hold				

=== 1997 ===
Legislative Election 1997: Aude's 2nd constituency
Party	Candidate	Votes	%	±%
PS	Jacques Bascou	20,345	32.94	
RPR	Alain Madalle	13,291	21.52	
FN	Yvonne Garnier	9,756	15.80	
PCF	Joseph Pérez	8,654	14.01	
DVD	Jean-Michel Feste	2,586	4.19	
LV	Maryse Arditi	2,040	3.30	
Others	N/A	5,086		
Turnout		64,748	71.82	
2nd round result
PS	Jacques Bascou	38,561	61.76	
RPR	Alain Madalle	23,872	38.24	
Turnout		67,364	74.74	
PS gain from RPR				

== Sources ==
- French Interior Ministry results website: "Résultats électoraux officiels en France" (in French).
