= Franck de Lapersonne =

French comedian, actor, theatre director and political candidate (born 1963)

Franck Lapersonne
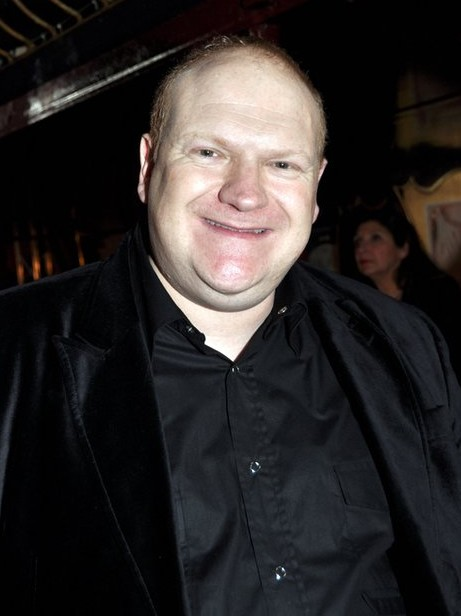
- Franck de La Personne at the 36th César Awards in 2011
- Born: 29 October 1963 (age 62); France
- Occupations: Actor; comedian; theatre director
- Years active: 1981–present

Franck Lapersonne (a.k.a. Franck de la Personne and Franck de Lapersonne) (born 29 October 1963) is a French comedian, actor, theatre director, and political candidate.

== Personal life ==
Franck de la Personne is the son of Jacques Lapersonne and Jacqueline Charlotte Poinson. He also has brothers and sisters. He graduated from the Conservatoire de Paris.

As of February 2017, he openly supported Marine Le Pen in the French presidential election. He also ran in the 2017 French legislative election to represent the Somme for the National Front.
He is now a vice president of the party "Les Patriotes" founded by Florian Philippot, the former right-hand man of Marine Le Pen.

== Theater ==
Year	Title	Author	Director	Notes
1981	Lorenzaccio	Alfred de Musset	François Timmerman	Théâtre 13
1981	L'Infini-Express	Martine Doutey	Jean-Pierre Terracol	Théâtre de la Lucarne
1986	The Hothouse	Harold Pinter	Robert Dhéry	Théâtre de l'Atelier
1987	The Imaginary Invalid	Molière	Pierre Boutron	Théâtre de l'Atelier
1988	Avanti	Neil Simon	Pierre Mondy	Théâtre du Palais-Royal
1989	La Station Chambaudet	Eugène Labiche	Jean Bouchaud	Théâtre TBB
1990–92	Un fil à la patte	Georges Feydeau	Pierre Mondy (2)	Théâtre du Palais-Royal
1992	Les Batailles	Jean-Michel Ribes	Jean-Michel Ribes	Théâtre Tristan-Bernard
1993	Darling chérie	Marc Camoletti	Marc Camoletti	Théâtre Michel
1994	Henry IV	Luigi Pirandello	Georges Wilson	Théâtre de l'Œuvre
1995	Le Vison voyageur	Ray Cooney & John Chapman	Patrick Guillemin	Théâtre de la Michodière
1995	Un couple infernal	Carole Brenner & Martine Visciano	Isabelle Nanty	Le Splendid
1995	L'Hôtel du libre échange	Georges Feydeau	Franck de la Personne	Théâtre de la Michodière
1996	Panique au Plazza	Ray Cooney	Pierre Mondy (3)	Théâtre des Variétés
1997–2000	Ma femme est folle	Jean Barbier	Franck de la Personne (2)	Théâtre des Nouveautés
2001	Première porte à gauche	Jean Barbier	Franck de la Personne (3)	Théâtre des Nouveautés
2002	Putain de soirée	Daniel Colas	Daniel Colas	Théâtre du Gymnase Marie Bell
2004	Vade retro	Laurent de Perse	Christian Laurent	Comédie de Paris
2005	T'as le bonjour d'Eugène	Eugène Labiche	Franck de Lapersonne (4)	Théâtre de Ménilmontant
2009-10	La Parenthèse	Laure Charpentier	Jean-Pierre Dravel & Olivier Macé	Théâtre Daunou
2014–15	Le Bouffon du Président	Olivier Lejeune	Olivier Lejeune	Théâtre des Variétés

== TV and Filmography ==
Year	Title	Role	Director	Notes
1983	Vitamine	Victor	Jeannette Hubert & Dominique Masson	TV series
1984	Christmas Carol		Pierre Boutron	TV movie
1985	Death in a French Garden	Guitar dealer	Michel Deville	
1986	Le rire de Caïn	Lafineur	Marcel Moussy	TV mini-series
1986	L'ami Maupassant	The assistant	Claude Santelli	TV series (1 episode)
1987	Les fortifs	Dédé	Marco Pico	TV movie
1987	French in Action	Hubert	Pierre Capretz	TV series
1988	Story of Women	Martinet	Claude Chabrol	
1988	Envoyez les violons		Roger Andrieux	
1989	Un père et passe	The cop	Sébastien Grall	
1989	L'invité surprise	TV Host	Georges Lautner	
1989	Palace	Client	Jean-Michel Ribes	TV series
1989	Condorcet	Marquis de Lafayette	Michel Soutter	TV mini-series
1990	Feu sur le candidat	David	Agnès Delarive	
1990	Avanti	John Wesley	Patrick Bureau	TV movie
1990	La belle Anglaise	Paul	Jacques Besnard	TV series (1 episode)
1991	Wonderful Times	The receptionist	Gérard Jugnot	
1991	Strangers dans la nuit	Lavenu	Sylvain Madigan	TV movie
1991	Imogène	Herbizier	Paul Vecchiali	TV series (1 episode)
1992	Le zèbre	Monsieur Chenu	Jean Poiret	
1992	My Wife's Girlfriends	The Head hunter	Didier Van Cauwelaert	
1992	Princesse Alexandra	Désormières	Denis Amar	TV movie
1992	Un fil à la patte	Ignace de Fontanet	Marion Sarraut	TV movie
1992	Darling chérie	Richard	Georges Folgoas	TV movie
1992	Pognon sur rue	Richard Leduc	Jean-Louis Bertucelli	TV movie
1992	Tout ou presque		Claude Vital	TV movie
1992	Secret de famille	Chicheray	Hervé Baslé	TV mini-series
1993	Le prix d'une femme	Bernard	Gérard Krawczyk	TV movie
1993	Commissaire Moulin	Gilles Lecourbe	Yves Rénier	TV series (1 episode)
1994	Chacun pour toi	Lucien	Jean-Michel Ribes (2)	
1994	La Vengeance d'une blonde	Stéphane	Jeannot Szwarc	
1994	Une qui promet	Clemont-Pichon	Marianne Lamour	TV movie
1994	B comme Bolo	Brakowski	Jean-Michel Ribes (3)	TV movie
1995	Maxime et Wanda: Les belles ordures	Fortin	Claude Vital (2)	TV movie
1995	Alice boit du petit lait	Pellegrin	Jean-Pierre Richard	TV movie
1995	L'homme aux semelles de vent	Paul Verlaine	Marc Rivière	TV movie
1996	Golden Boy	Norbert	Jean-Pierre Vergne	
1996	The Proprietor	TV Moderator	Ismail Merchant	
1996	Sexy Zap	Professor	Philippe Briday, Didier Philippe-Gérard, Richard Ugolini & Léo Bazzar	TV series (6 episodes)
1997	Lucie Aubrac	Aubry	Claude Berri	
1997	Quadrille	Head waiter	Valérie Lemercier	
1997	Marquise	Monsieur	Véra Belmont	
1997	Un malade en or	Schumacher	Sylvain Madigan (2)	TV movie
1997	Paradis d'enfer	Wilfried	Dominique Masson (3)	TV series
1997	Jamais deux sans toi...t	Didier Sacha	Emmanuel Fonlladosa & Dominique Masson (2)	TV series (3 episodes)
1998	Alice and Martin	The Examining Magistrate	André Téchiné	
1999	Le derrière	Georgette	Valérie Lemercier (2)	
1999	Rembrandt	Hendrick van Uylenburgh	Charles Matton	
1999	Balzac	Tailor Bush	Josée Dayan	TV movie
1999	Un homme en colère	Michel Gibot	Laurence Katrian	TV series (1 episode)
2000	Actors	Client	Bertrand Blier	
2000	Nestor Burma	Monsieur Charles	Jacob Berger	TV series (1 episode)
2003	Les Côtelettes	Doctor	Bertrand Blier (2)	
2003	L'île atlantique		Gérard Mordillat	TV movie
2004	Louis Page	Pierre Burgo	Alain Schwartzstein	TV series (1 episode)
2005	Palais royal!	Minister of Health	Valérie Lemercier (3)	
2006	Le ciel sur la tête	Yvan	Régis Musset	TV movie
2007	Survivre avec les loups	Monsieur Valle	Véra Belmont (2)	
2007	Le temps des secrets	Uncle Jules	Thierry Chabert	TV movie
2007	Le temps des amours	Uncle Jules	Thierry Chabert (2)	TV movie
2008	A Day at the Museum	Rochebouet	Jean-Michel Ribes (4)	
2008	Marie et Madeleine	Junot	Joyce Buñuel	TV movie
2008	Terre de lumière	Gustave Verlaire	Stéphane Kurc	TV mini-series
2009	La reine et le cardinal	Jean-Baptiste Colbert	Marc Rivière (2)	TV movie
2009	Ce jour là, tout a changé	Georges Danton	Arnaud Sélignac	TV series (1 episode)
2010	Gigola	Pascal	Laure Charpentier	
2010	Au siècle de Maupassant	Maxime d'Aulnay	Claude Chabrol (2)	TV series (1 episode)
2010	Les vivants et les morts	Behren	Gérard Mordillat (2)	TV series (8 episodes)
2011	Monte Carlo	Grand Belle's Manager	Thomas Bezucha	
2011	Case départ	The priest	Lionel Steketee, Fabrice Eboué & Thomas N'Gijol	
2011	Une famille formidable	Director Smartex	Joël Santoni	TV series (1 episode)
2012	The Chef	Client Cargo	Daniel Cohen	
2012	Les cinq parties du monde	The Chouf	Gérard Mordillat (3)	TV movie
2012–present	No Limit	Professor Grimberg	Didier Le Pêcheur, Julien Despaux, …	TV series (21 episodes)
2013	Le grand retournement	Banker Franck	Gérard Mordillat (4)	
2014	Le crocodile du Botswanga	Monsieur Pierre	Lionel Steketee (2) & Fabrice Eboué (2)	
2014	Deux petites filles en bleu	Cotta	Jean-Marc Thérin	TV movie
