= Aude's 3rd constituency =

Constituency of the National Assembly of France

3rd constituency of Aude
- inline Constituency of the National Assembly of France

- The three constituencies of Aude

- Aude in France
- Deputy: Julien Rancoule; RN
- Department: Aude
- Cantons: Alaigne, Alzonne, Axat, Belcaire, Belpech, Castelnaudary-Nord, Castelnaudary-Sud, Chalabre, Couiza, Fanjeaux, Limoux, Montréal, Quillan, Saint-Hilaire, Saissac, Salles-sur-l'Hers
- Registered voters: 88,637

The 3rd constituency of Aude is a French legislative constituency in the Aude département.

== Description ==
It is located in the west of the Department running from north to south. It is mainly rural, but includes the towns of Castelnaudary and Limoux.

== Deputies ==
Election	Member	Party
1988	Jacques Cambolive	PS
1993	Daniel Arata	RPR
1997	Jean-Paul Dupré	PS
2002	Jean-Paul Dupré	PS
2007	Jean-Paul Dupré	PS
2012	Jean-Paul Dupré	PS
2017	Mireille Robert	LREM
2022	Julien Rancoule	RN
2024	Julien Rancoule	RN

== Election results ==
=== 2024 ===
Candidate	Party	Alliance	First round			Second round		
Candidate	Party	Alliance	Votes	%	+/–	Votes	%	+/–
Julien Rancoule	RN		27,946	44.70	+16.25	31,514	52.07	-1.25
Philippe Andrieu	PS	NFP	20,426	32.67	6.87	29,004	47.93	+1.25
Sylvie Sorel-Lestin	RE	Ensemble	8,155	13.04	-8.80			
Jean-François Leclerc	LR	UDC	2,096	3.35	new			
Christine Champion	UDI		1,868	2.99	-0.24			
Bernard Bianco	RES!		759	1.21	new			
Nathalie Marteel	REC		681	1.09	-3.60			
Dominique Galonnier	LO		585	0.94	-0.08			
Votes			62,516	100.00		60,518	100.00	
Valid votes			62,516	96.53	-0.54	60,518	92.84	+7.20
Blank votes			1,327	2.05	+0.05	3,245	4.98	-5.38
Null votes			922	1.42	+0.49	1,419	2.18	-1.82
Turnout			64,765	72.07	+16.26	65,182	72.54	+17.12
Abstentions			25,094	27.93	-16.26	24,670	27.46	-17.12
Registered voters			89,859			89,852		
Result			RN HOLD					

=== 2022 ===
Legislative Election 2022: Aude's 3rd constituency
Party	Candidate	Votes	%	±%
RN	Julien Rancoule	13,839	28.45	+9.86
LFI (NUPÉS)	Johanna Adda-Netter	12,547	25.80	-11.47
LREM (Ensemble)	Mireille Robert	10,624	21.84	−7.36
PRG	Aurélien Turchetto	4,383	9.01	N/A
REC	Valérie Ducom	2,281	4.69	N/A
UDI (UDC)	Carine Pottier	1,573	3.23	−7.44
DVE	Jacques Cros	1,554	3.20	N/A
Others	N/A	1,836		
Turnout		48,637	55.81	−0.85
2nd round result
RN	Julien Rancoule	22,725	53.32	N/A
LFI (NUPÉS)	Johanna Adda-Netter	19,894	46.68	−0.22
Turnout		42,619	55.42	+5.67
RN gain from LREM				

=== 2017 ===
Candidate	Label	First round		Second round	
Candidate	Label	Votes	%	Votes	%
Mireille Robert	LREM	14,223	29.20	19,605	53.10
André Viola	PS	9,430	19.36	17,318	46.90
Christelle de L'Épinois	FN	9,053	18.59		
Manon Le Bretton	FI	7,185	14.75		
Catherine Vergé	LR	5,197	10.67		
Daniel Dédiès	ECO	1,539	3.16		
Jacques Cros	ECO	1,145	2.35		
Walter Lupano	DIV	370	0.76		
Dominique Galonnier	LO	305	0.63		
Michel Martin	PCRF	144	0.30		
Michel Fernandez	DVG	100	0.21		
Marie Reche	DVD	15	0.03		
Votes		48,706	100.00	36,923	100.00
Valid votes		48,706	96.97	36,923	83.74
Blank votes		1,055	2.10	4,751	10.77
Null votes		468	0.93	2,421	5.49
Turnout		50,229	56.66	44,095	49.75
Abstentions		38,422	43.34	44,542	50.25
Registered voters		88,651		88,637	
Source: Ministry of the Interior

=== 2012 ===
Summary of the 10 June and 17 June 2012 French legislative in Aude’s 3rd Constituency election results
Candidate	Party		1st round		2nd round	
Candidate	Party		Votes	%	Votes	%
Jean-Paul Dupre	Socialist Party	PS	25,040	44.96%	32,520	62.95%
Emmanuel Bresson	Union for a Popular Movement	UMP	12,559	22.55%	19,141	37.05%
Marie-Josée Sutter	National Front	FN	8,758	15.72%		
Marie-Angèle Larruy	Left Front	FG	4,512	8.10%		
Lidwine Kempf	Regionalist	REG	1,417	2.54%		
Jean-Pierre Quaglieri	Miscellaneous Left	DVG	1,407	2.53%		
Jacques Cros	Ecologist	ECO	927	1.66%		
André Arrans	New Centre-Presidential Majority	NCE	389	0.70%		
Dominique Galonnier	Far Left	EXG	294	0.53%		
Patrick Dhersin	Ecologist	ECO	212	0.38%		
Maria Lesoeur	Regionalist	REG	181	0.32%		
Total			55,696	100%	51,661	100%
Registered voters			87,604		87,655	
Blank/Void ballots			1,090	1.92%	2,672	4.92%
Turnout			56,786	64.82%	54,333	61.99%
Abstentions			30,818	35.18%	33,322	38.01%
Result					PS HOLD	

=== 2007 ===
Summary of the 10 June and 17 June 2007 French legislative in Aude’s 3rd Constituency election results
Candidate	Party		1st round		2nd round	
Candidate	Party		Votes	%	Votes	%
Jean-Paul Dupre	Socialist Party	PS	20,666	41.86%	28,728	58.38%
Jean Salvignol	Union for a Popular Movement	UMP	16,330	33.08%	20,479	41.62%
René Caunes	Democratic Movement	MoDem	2,485	5.03%		
Paule Mercier	National Front	FN	2,160	4.37%		
Marie-Ange Larruy	Communist	COM	1,663	3.37%		
Annabelle Pujol	Far Left	EXG	1,558	3.16%		
Josiane Hograindleur	The Greens	VEC	1,242	2.52%		
Jean-François Leclerc	Movement for France	MPF	808	1.64%		
Patrice Mallet	Hunting, Fishing, Nature, Traditions	CPNT	787	1.59%		
Lucette Pinel	Divers	DIV	419	0.85%		
Yvette Lestrade	Ecologist	ECO	402	0.81%		
Dominique Galonnier	Far Left	EXG	350	0.71%		
Erick Mercher	Far Right	EXD	308	0.62%		
Jean-Jacques Rabineau	Majorité Présidentielle		193	0.39%		
Martin de Soos	Miscellaneous Right	DVD	1	0.00%		
Total			49,372	100%	49,207	100%
Registered voters			74,191		74,180	
Blank/Void ballots			1,135	2.25%	1,850	3.62%
Turnout			50,507	68.08%	51,057	68.83%
Abstentions			23,684	31.92%	23,123	31.17%
Result					PS HOLD	

=== 2002 ===
Legislative Election 2002: Aude's 3rd constituency
Party	Candidate	Votes	%	±%
PS	Jean-Paul Dupré	20,483	41.27	
UDF	Monique Denux	13,690	27.58	
FN	William Macou	5,986	12.06	
PCF	Jean-Claude Castillo	2,000	4.03	
LV	Jean-Claude Beirieu	1,399	2.82	
CPNT	Eliane Palop	1,304	2.63	
Others	N/A	4,769		
Turnout		51,161	71.39	
2nd round result
PS	Jean-Paul Dupré	26,815	58.20	
UDF	Monique Denux	19,261	41.80	
Turnout		48,827	68.16	
PS hold				

=== 1997 ===
Legislative Election 1997: Aude's 3rd constituency
Party	Candidate	Votes	%	±%
PS	Jean-Paul Dupré	20,327	40.89	
RPR	Daniel Arata	13,584	27.33	
FN	Jean-Pierre Cordier	5,922	11.91	
PCF	Yvan Cazcarra	4,709	9.47	
LV	Michel Cornuet	1,523	3.06	
MPF	Jean-François Leclerc	1,264	2.54	
Others	N/A			
Turnout		52,347	75.56	
2nd round result
PS	Jean-Paul Dupré	31,060	61.05	
RPR	Daniel Arata	19,815	38.95	
Turnout		54,382	78.51	
PS gain from RPR				

== Sources ==
- French Interior Ministry results website: "Résultats électoraux officiels en France" (in French).
