= Valérie Allain =

French actress (born 1966)

- Born: April 3, 1966; Saint-Raphaël, Var, France
- Years active: 1988－
- Children: 2

Valérie Allain (born 3 April 1966) is a French actress.

She portrayed "Mireille" in the 1987 instructional television series French in Action, which acquired a cult following largely because of the appeal of the romantic comedic theme of its fifty-two episodes of full-immersion French language lessons. She has two children: a boy, born in 1990, Pablo and a girl, born in 2003, Juliette.

== Professional career ==
- Allain was featured (but did not pose) in the November 1988 edition of Playboy in "Stars of the Cinema in 1988." She appeared fully nude in Jean-Luc Godard's segment of Aria.

== Filmography ==
=== Cinema ===
- Le Cowboy (1984) – Sylvie
- À nous les garçons (1984) – Stéphanie
- Le véto (1985)
- Club de rencontres (1986)
- Armide, a short film in the anthology Aria (1987)
- Les nouveaux tricheurs (1987)
- Alouette, je te plumerai (1987)
- Un parfum d'odyssée (1988)
- La chambre d'ami (1988)
- The Miser (1990)
- Princesse Alexandra (1991)
- La plage (1991)
- De justesse (1992)
- TOB (tête d'oeuf bouilli) (1994)
- Le moine (1997)
- Présomption d'innocence (1997)
- L'inconnue de la nationale (1998)
- Amorce (2000)

=== Television ===
- Le chevalier de Pardaillan (1985)
- French in Action (1987)
- Un château au soleil (1988) (miniseries)
- Duo (1990)
- Un comédien dans un jeu de quilles (1990) (miniseries)
- Un mort très convenable (1992) (miniseries)
- Morasseix (1993)
- Une femme sur mesure (1997)
- Cassidi et Cassidi: Le démon de midi (1997)
