= Alain Péréa =

French politician

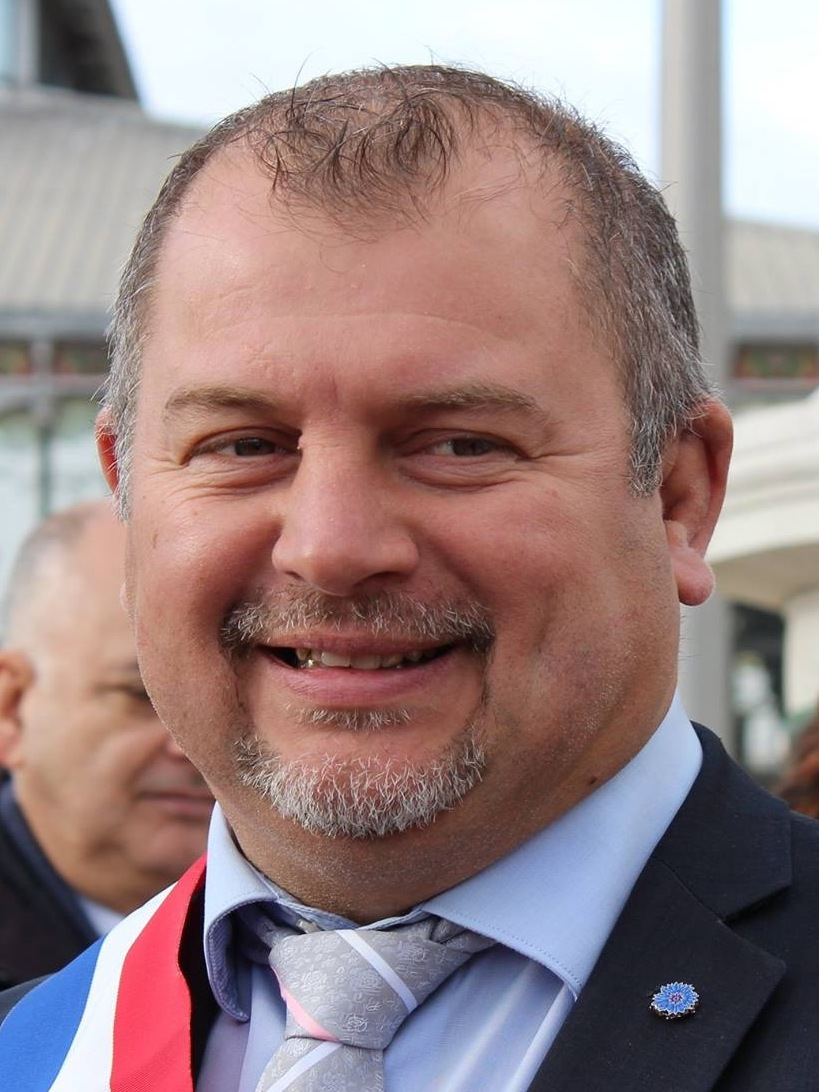
- Alain Péréa in 2017

Member of the French National Assembly for Aude's 2nd constituency
- Incumbent
- Assumed office 21 June 2017
- Preceded by: Marie-Hélène Fabre
- Succeeded by: Frédéric Falcon

Personal details
- Born: 5 June 1971 (age 53); Béziers (Hérault)
- Political party: En Marche!

Alain Péréa (born 5 June 1971) is a French politician of La République En Marche! (LREM) who was elected to the French National Assembly on 18 June 2017, representing the department of Aude.

== Political career ==
In parliament, Péréa served on the Committee on Sustainable Development. In July 2019, he announced his candidacy to succeed Barbara Pompili the committee’s chair; in an internal vote, he lost against Pompili.

In addition to his committee assignments, Péréa was part of the French-Croatian Parliamentary Friendship Group and the French delegation to the Parliamentary Assembly of the Union for the Mediterranean. He also co-chaired the Hunting and Territories group.

Péréa ran for re-election in the 2022 legislative elections but was defeated in the second round by Frédéric Falcon of the National Rally.

== Other activities ==
- FranceAgriMer, Member of the Supervisory Board

== Political positions ==
In July 2019, Péréa voted in favor of the French ratification of the European Union’s Comprehensive Economic and Trade Agreement (CETA) with Canada. In 2020, Péréa was one of the LREM members who endorsed an animal welfare referendum calling for a ban on some hunting practices that are deemed "cruel".

== See also ==
- 2017 French legislative election
