= Julien Rancoule =

French politician (born 1993)

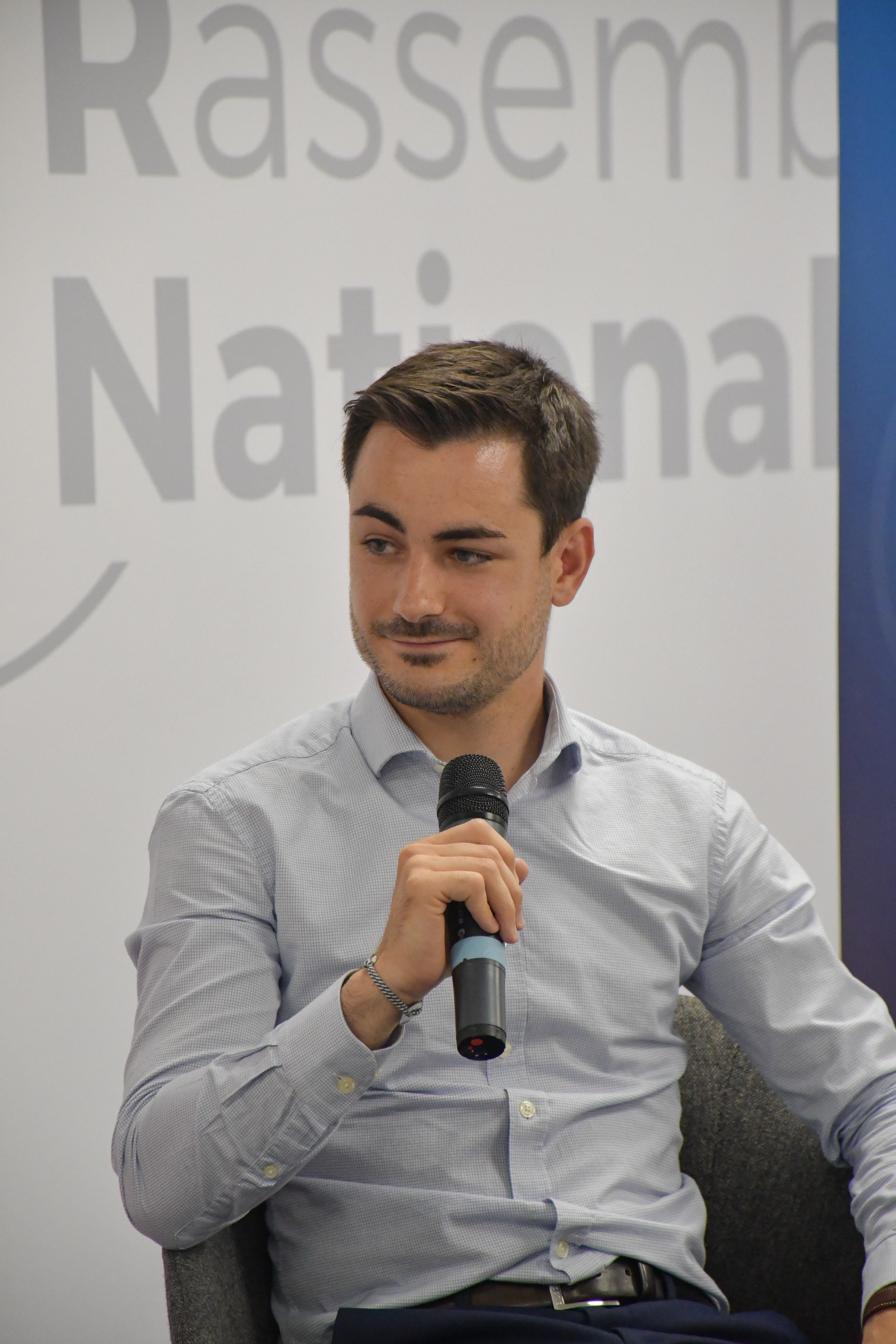

Member of the National Assembly for Aude's 3rd constituency
- Incumbent
- Assumed office 22 June 2022
- Preceded by: Mireille Robert

Personal details
- Born: 31 July 1993 (age 33) Carcassonne, France
- Party: National Rally (2011–present)

Julien Rancoule (French pronunciation: [ʒyljɛ̃ ʁɑ̃kul]; born 31 July 1993) is a French politician of the National Rally (RN) who has represented the 3rd constituency of Aude in the National Assembly since 2022.

== Career ==
Rancoule joined the National Front (later renamed National Rally) in 2011. He has been a municipal councillor of Limoux since 2020, when he led the National Rally list in the municipal election.

In the 2022 legislative election, he won Aude's 3rd constituency with 53.3% of the second-round vote. He was elected to the National Assembly along with two other RN deputies in all three of Aude's constituencies. He was reelected in 2024 with 52% of the second-round vote.

In the National Assembly, Rancoule has sat on the Committee on National Defence and the Armed Forces (2022–2024) and on the Committee on Laws (2024–present).

In 2026 he was a candidate for the Senate in Aude, placing third with 30% of the first-round vote.
