= André Viola =

French politician (born 1971)

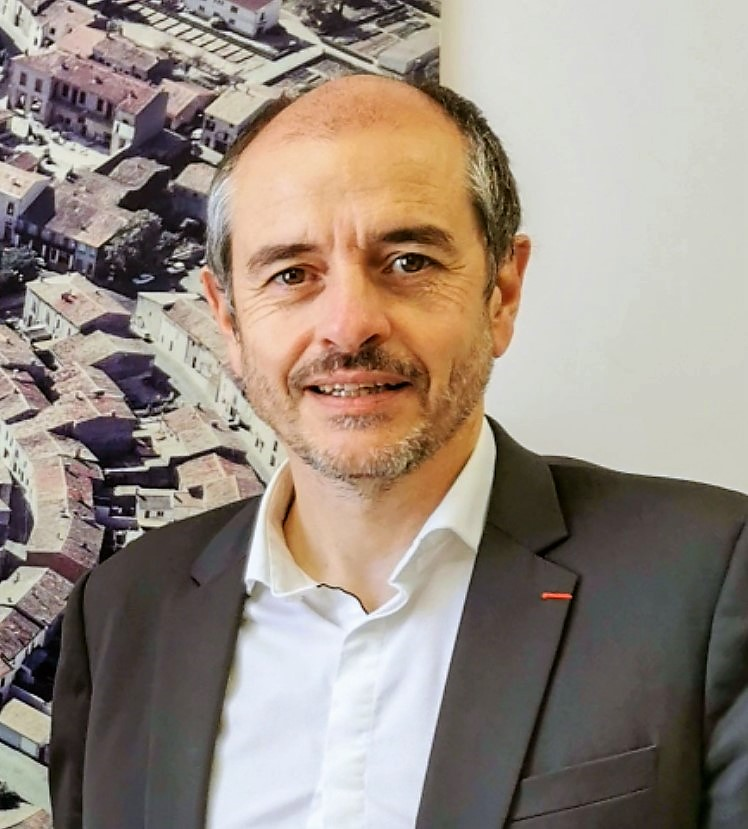
- Viola in 2020

President of the Departmental Council of Aude
- In office 31 March 2011 – 18 June 2020
- Preceded by: Marcel Rainaud
- Succeeded by: Hélène Sandragné

Personal details
- Born: 24 March 1971 (age 55)
- Party: Independent (since 2025)
- Other political affiliations: Socialist Party (1991–2025)

André Viola (born 24 March 1971) is a French politician. From 2011 to 2020, he served as president of the Departmental Council of Aude. From 2003 to 2011, he served as mayor of Bram.
