= Connect With English =

Television series

Connect With English is an educational dramatized television series that was recorded in 1997 by the Annenberg/CPB Project (now Annenberg Media) and WGBH Boston for people learning English. The 48-episode program teaches English through use of a narrative fiction storyline and discussion segments featuring actual adult learners.

The show premiered in 1998 and is aired by many PBS stations in the United States and by The Annenberg Channel, a cable and satellite TV service available to schools and other community organizations. Notable featured actors include Karin Anglin, Carlos Lacamara and Mark Consuelos.

== Main characters ==
- Rebecca Mary Theresa Casey (Karin Anglin) - A 28-year-old woman who has served as the maternal figure to her father and brother since her mother's death twelve years ago. During the day she works in a computer factory and in the evenings she is a singer. Wanting to be better, she decides to attend the San Francisco College of Music. She travels cross-country and has many unforgettable adventures along the way. She is of Irish descent.
- Alberto Manuel Mendoza (Mark Consuelos) - is a native of San Francisco. He is an architect who likes to take pictures in his spare time. He firsts meets Rebecca while she's traveling through the desert and her car breaks down. He helps Rebecca out and later shows her San Francisco. He definitely has a romantic interest in her, but Rebecca isn't ready for a relationship. He is of Mexican descent.
- Ramon Mendoza (Carlos Lacamara)

== See also ==
- French in Action
- Fokus Deutsch
- Destinos
