= Fokus Deutsch =

- Country of origin: United States
- Original language: German
- No. of episodes: 36

Production
- Running time: 26 minutes

Original release
- Release: 1999

Fokus Deutsch is a German-language course developed by Robert "Bob" Di Donato, Professor of German at the Miami University in Ohio. It was produced by WGBH Boston, Inter Nationes, and the Goethe-Institut in 1999. It was funded by Annenberg/CPB, and has been aired frequently on PBS since then. The course includes workbooks, textbooks, and a 36-episode television series with audio CDs comprising 24 audio programs. It focuses on the story of Marion Koslowski and her family, intermixed with interviews of native speakers of German from Germany, Austria, and Switzerland, including Erika, a survivor from the World War II years; Guy, a student from Cameroon studying in Germany at RWTH Aachen; Grace, a Zimbabwean-German; and Gürkan, a Turkish-German. There are also documentaries on German history and society, past and present. As of 2014, Annenberg Media lists the series as discontinued.

== The episodes ==
Each episode is around a half-hour long. The episodes are divided as follows:

- Folge 1. "Arbeitslos" (Unemployed)
- Folge 2. "Kein Geld" (No Money)
- Folge 3. "Wie geht es Papa" (How's Papa Doing?)
- Wiederholung 1. (Review 1)
- Folge 4. "Umzug nach Köln" (The Move to Cologne)
- Folge 5. "Das Karnevalsfest" (The Mardi Gras Celebration)
- Folge 6. "Der Unfall" (The Accident)
- Wiederholung 2. (Review 2)
- Folge 7. "Der Urlaub" (The Vacation)
- Folge 8. "Der Insel Rügen" (On the Island of Rügen)
- Folge 9. "Abenteuer und Liebe" (Adventure and Love)
- Wiederholung 3. (Review 3)
- Folge 10. "Die Wespe" (The Wasp)
- Folge 11. "Ein Liebesdrama" (A Love Story)
- Folge 12. "Silke" (Silke)
- Wiederholung 4. (Review 4)
- Folge 13. "Der Auszubildende" (The Apprentice)
- Folge 14. "Der Trick" (The Trick)
- Folge 15. "Zu viel Salz" (Too Much Salt)
- Wiederholung 5. (Review 5)
- Folge 16. "Am Wochenende" (On the Weekend)
- Folge 17. "Nach Thüringen?" (To Thuringia?)
- Folge 18. "Die Lösung" (The Solution)
- Wiederholung 6. (Review 6)
- Folge 19. "Der Spaghetti-Professor" (The Spaghetti Professor)
- Folge 20. "Der Umweltsünder" (The Polluter)
- Folge 21. "Die falschen Klamotten" (The Wrong Clothes)
- Wiederholung 7. (Review 7)
- Folge 22. "Ein neues Gemälde" (A New Painting)
- Folge 23. "Der Hausmann" (The House Husband)
- Folge 24. "Das Au Pair" (The Au Pair)
- Wiederholung 8. (Review 8)
- Folge 25. "Eine Familiengeschichte" (A Family History), "Lebensstile" (Life Styles)
- Folge 26. "Jugend in Bewegung" (Young People on the Move), "Drei Jugendporträts" (Three Youths)
- Folge 27. "Geschichte eines Gymnasiums" (History of a Gymnasium), "Der Schulalltag" (A Typical School Day)
- Wiederholung 9. (Review 9)
- Folge 28. "Geschichte einer Universität" (History of a University), "Ein Student aus Kamerun" (A Student From Cameroon)
- Folge 29. "Wirtschaft im Wandel" (A Changing Economy), "Hilfe für Arbeitslose" (Help for the Unemployed)
- Folge 30. "Die Frauenbewegung" (The Women's Movement), "Im Auftrag der Frauen" (Representing Women)
- Wiederholung 10. (Review 10)
- Folge 31. "Ein grünes Hobby" (A Green Hobby), "Weiterbilden in der Freizeit" (Leisure Learning)
- Folge 32. "Urlaub: Gestern und heute" (Vacation: Yesterday and Today), "Abenteuerurlaub" (Adventure Vacation)
- Folge 33. "Ein Kurort" (A Spa), "Ein Arztbesuch" (A Visit to the Doctor)
- Wiederholung 11. (Review 11)
- Folge 34. "Typisch Deutsch?" (Typically German?), "Vom Sauerkraut zur Pizza" (From Sauerkraut to Pizza)
- Folge 35. "Auf Kosten der Umwelt" (At What Cost to the Environment?), "Umweltschutz zu Hause" (Environmental Protection at Home)
- Folge 36. "Theater für Jugendliche" (Theater for Young People), "100 Jahre deutscher Film" (100 Years of German Cinema)
- Wiederholung 12. (Review 12)

== Main characters ==
- Professor — Professor Robert di Donato
- Marion — Susanne Dyrchs
- Papa —
- Mama —
- Lars —
- Rüdiger —

== Places visited ==
- Cologne
- Rheinhausen
- Heidelberg

== See also ==
- Connect With English
- French in Action
- Destinos
