= Madeleine Laissac =

French politician

Madeleine Laissac (28 July 1900, Béziers - 18 March 1971) was a French politician. She represented the French Section of the Workers' International (SFIO) in the National Assembly from 1951 to 1955. She was also mayor of Saint-Nazaire-de-Ladarez, in Herault, from 1947 to 1971.
