= Destinos =

American television program

- Created by: Bill VanPatten and James Cooke
- Developed by: Martha Alford Marks; Richard V. Teschner; Story Consultant James Cooke
- Starring: Liliana Abud Carlos Aguilar; Augusto Benedico; Arsenio Campos; Luís Couturier; Edwin Francisco; Edith Kleinmann; Servando Manzetti; Jorge Martínez de Hoyos; Yasmín Pereira Arturo Puig
- Country of origin: United States
- Original language: Spanish
- No. of episodes: 52

Production
- Running time: 29 minutes

Original release
- Release: August 29, 1992 – February 20, 1993

Destinos: An Introduction to Spanish, also known as simply Destinos, is a television program created by Bill VanPatten, who at the time was Professor of Spanish and Second Language Acquisition at the University of Illinois at Urbana Champaign. Running for two seasons, the show began in 1992 and was designed to introduce viewers to the basics of the Spanish language. Its 52 episodes are often used for educational purposes in schools and, until July 1, 2026, were available online from the Annenberg Learner site. Annenberg discontinued hosting the program on their website and is now in the process of archiving it. It may still be available on some local PBS stations. According to the Annenberg site, Destinos is one of the most popular series on the site to stream, and has sold more than any other Annenberg Media learning series or course.

Destinos was produced by WGBH Boston and funded by the Annenberg/CPB Project, with additional funding by the Geraldine R. Dodge Foundation.

== Format ==
Destinos uses the telenovela (Spanish soap opera) format to teach Spanish-language communication and comprehension skills. Early episodes have English-language narration in addition to Spanish dialogue, but the English content continually decreases before disappearing entirely. The viewer is introduced to the accents, dialects and cultures of various Spanish-speaking countries.

The series consists of 52 episodes that cover the scope of Spanish grammar, including verb tenses of present, future (including future of uncertainty), imperfect, preterite, perfect, pluperfect, participles, and the present, imperfect, and perfect forms of the subjunctive. It also covers a variety of country-specific usages: for example, it uses both the verb extrañar (to miss somebody or something) and the phrase echar de menos (which means the same thing). After the early episodes, the conversation is done at more or less normal speaking speed, improving the student's comprehension. Spanish subtitles are included on both VHS and DVD versions — translations are not provided. The DVDs are available from the Annenberg/CPB project website.

An accompanying set of materials is available to complement the series; these include a set of audio tapes and a textbook, the latter of which follows the series episode-for-episode but provides a more systematic presentation such as would be used in a classroom course.

Destinos is characterized by frequent reviews of preceding episodes. This may make the series seem overly long and excessive, but the reviews provide repetition in order for viewers to retain the material. It is also characterized by the patriarchal figure Don Fernando, who - despite being on his deathbed in Episode 1 - never actually dies.

== Availability ==
From at least January 2020 until July 1, 2026, all episodes of Destinos were available as videos to play back on the Annenberg Learner website. On November 3, 2025, the Annenberg Learner blog announced that Annenberg Learner would be sunsetting.

The Learner website did remove the program and now displays a message stating that the program is permanently closed and is now in the process of being archived.

== Main characters ==
- Fernando Castillo Saavedra (Augusto Benedico) — The patriarch of the Destinos family was born in Spain but immigrated to Mexico following the Spanish Civil War. Don Fernando initiates an investigation after receiving a letter from a stranger, an acquaintance of his first wife, Rosario del Valle, whom he had long presumed killed in the civil war. The stranger, Teresa Suárez, lives in Spain and learned of Don Fernando's existence from a newspaper article. Sra. Suárez claims that Rosario survived the war and that she and Don Fernando have a son. Don Fernando is presently a widower and is in ill health. With his second wife, Carmen Márquez de Castillo, he had four children who are still living: Ramón, Carlos, Juan, and Mercedes. He is a retired industrialist who owns La Gavia, a vast, reconstructed estate northwest of Mexico City, D.F.
- Raquel Rodríguez Orozco (Liliana Abud) — was born in the United States and lives in Los Angeles though she has family in Mexico and has visited there frequently. She is a lawyer contracted by Don Fernando's brother, Pedro, and the Castillo-Saavedra family to conduct the investigation. Her research leads her first to Spain to find Teresa Suárez. She subsequently travels to Argentina, Puerto Rico, and Mexico in her search to discover the truth about Don Fernando's first wife, Rosario, and the child they had together.
- Ángel Castillo del Valle — The only son of Rosario and Don Fernando was born in Seville, Spain in 1937 and died in 1991. He lived his entire life believing his father had died in the Spanish Civil War. He grew up in Argentina, where his mother immigrated after the war. Ángel was a sailor for a short (and unsuccessful) period of time and made his living as an artist after moving to San Juan, Puerto Rico. There he married and had two children: Angela and Roberto.
- Arturo Iglesias del Valle (Arturo Puig) — was born in Argentina and lives in Buenos Aires. He is a psychiatrist, the only son of Rosario and Martín Iglesias and half-brother to Ángel. He agrees to assist Raquel in her search for Ángel, with whom he has lost contact. Arturo also develops a relationship with Raquel during her time in Buenos Aires. This occurs around Episodio 14.
- Angela Castillo Soto (Yasmín Pereira) — Was born in and lives in San Juan, Puerto Rico. She is the only daughter of Ángel and is a computer programmer by profession. She attended the Interamericana de Puerto Rico in San Germán but now lives in the apartment previously owned by her parents.
- Roberto Castillo Soto (Edwin Francisco) — Was born in San Juan and currently lives in an unnamed small town in Mexico, where he is taking part in an archeological dig. The only son of Ángel, Roberto is an archeology student and is the last major character introduced in the series.

== Supporting educational materials ==
Educational material has been released to accompany the episodes. The first episode refers to these as one textbook, two workbooks and audiocassettes. Additional material has been produced since the release of the series.

- Student materials
  - Destinos: An Introduction to Spanish (Student Textbook). VanPatten, Marks & Teschner. 1991. McGraw-Hill. ISBN 978-0-07-002069-6
  - Workbook/Study Guide I (Lecciones 1-26). VanPatten, Marks & Teschner. 1991. McGraw-Hill. ISBN 978-0-07-002072-6
  - Workbook/Study Guide II (Lecciones 27-52). VanPatten, Marks & Teschner. 1992. McGraw-Hill. ISBN 978-0-07-002073-3
  - Audiocassette tapes (Lecciones 1-26)
  - Audiocassette tapes (Lecciones 27-52)

== Plot ==
=== Summary ===
Destinos recounts the story of Los Angeles-based lawyer Raquel Rodríguez who is hired by the family of Fernando Castillo (Augusto Benedico). He had discovered that his first wife, Rosario, did not die in the Spanish Civil War as he had believed, but had survived and had an unknown child. In the course of her investigation of the case, Raquel travels to a number of Spanish-speaking areas — Seville and Madrid, Spain; Buenos Aires, Argentina; San Juan and San Germán, Puerto Rico; and Mexico — has a number of adventures and mishaps, meets a love interest (Arturo Puig) and faces a number of melodramatic conflicts.

Recurring plot elements include Raquel traveling in pursuit of the investigation, letters (primarily to determine last known addresses of people), comic mix-ups, and death (although nobody dies during the series, many characters are found to have died before then, and Don Fernando is on the verge of dying).

=== Details ===
The beginning: In a large estate called La Gavia outside Mexico City, a very old Don Fernando has been keeping a secret for some time: he received a letter, from one Señora Teresa Suárez of Seville, Spain, stating that his first wife, Rosario, did not die in the Spanish Civil War as he had thought.

Fernando's (unspecified) medical problems are increasing, however, and when he starts seeing hallucinations of Rosario he finally decides to act. He gathers his entire extended family, which includes the families of his children, Juan, Carlos, Ramon, and Mercedes, together and explains to them that he wants to find out what happened to Rosario, who was pregnant when they lost contact. His brother Pedro hires Raquel, a lawyer of his acquaintance, to investigate.

Spain Arc: Raquel first travels to Seville to meet Sra. Suárez. She meets and spends time with family members, son Miguel, and Sra. Suarez' grandson Jaime, and soon learns from them that Sra. Suárez has since moved to Madrid and won't talk by telephone. Raquel travels to Madrid; after a comic mix-up of identities and hotel rooms, where she is thought to be the winner of the Spanish lottery, she then meets Sra. Suárez's son and is taken to see her. She learns that Rosario has moved to Buenos Aires, Argentina and is given the address from Rosario's last letter. She also learns that Rosario had likewise thought Fernando had died in the war and that Rosario and Fernando have a son named Angel. In parting, Sra. Suárez's last words to Raquel prove prophetic: "Life is not all work: you also need to dedicate some time to your heart!"

Argentina Arc: Raquel then travels to Argentina to search for Rosario. When she finds that Rosario no longer lives at the address on the letter Sra. Suárez gave her (the Estancia Santa Susana, a real tourist ranch near Buenos Aires), she follows a lead from a local gaucho, happens upon the office of psychiatrist Dr. Arturo Iglesias, and soon finds out he is Angel's half-brother and a son of Rosario. Arturo takes Raquel to the family crypt, and there, Raquel discovers that Rosario had actually died. For years, Arturo has been estranged from Angel, whom he blamed for his father's deadly heart attack. Arturo and Raquel begin a long search for acquaintances of Angel in his last known location, an Italian seaport neighborhood of Buenos Aires called La Boca. Armed only with a picture of a 20-year-old Angel, they eventually find an outgoing old sailor named Héctor Condotti, who remembers his good friend Angel. After several days, during which Raquel and Arturo start to develop a romance, Héctor produces a letter with Angel's address in San Juan, Puerto Rico.

Puerto Rico Arc: Raquel then flies to San Juan and goes to the address in Old San Juan. From a neighbor, Raquel finds out that Angel died only a few months ago and had a wife who died several years before. While photographing the grave of Angel, Raquel runs into Angel's daughter, Angela. She tells Angela the whole story, including that she has a grandfather in Mexico and an uncle in Argentina she has never heard of. Raquel also finds out that Angela has a brother, Roberto, living in Mexico. Angela's stern aunt Olga does not want her to travel to Mexico with Raquel, but after a trip to see her grandmother in San Germán, her grandmother gives her blessing to travel. Along the two-hour trip to San Germán, they have car trouble and must stay overnight in Ponce.

Finally, we meet Angela's boyfriend and nauseating mujeriego ("womanizer"), Jorge. He makes several clumsy passes at Raquel. A mild fight between Raquel and Angela ensues; not because Raquel tells Angela about the passes (she decides not to based on advice from her mother), but because Angela thinks the world of him and wants to give him a significant amount of money to start a theater. Nonetheless, Raquel and Angela are about to travel together to Mexico when they learn that Angela's brother Roberto has been trapped in an archaeological excavation in Mexico.

Mexico/Rescuing Roberto Arc: Raquel and Angela travel to Mexico, where they quickly drive to a small town where Roberto is trapped in a pre-Columbian excavation. Arturo was to meet them in Mexico City, but they cannot get in contact with him, so he spends several days in Mexico City wondering what happened to them, while they stay at a local church. Several episodes (possibly the slowest in the series) pass where Raquel and Angela are waiting for Roberto to be rescued and Arturo is wondering what happened to Raquel. Finally, Roberto is rescued and Angela and Roberto meet their uncle Arturo.

Love Triangle Arc: After Raquel calls her mother back in Los Angeles to catch up, her mother hatches a scheme to get Raquel back together with Luis, an old boyfriend. Luis called and talked to Raquel's mother and began trying to get back into Raquel's life. Luis impressed Raquel's mother with his apparent maturity and wealth, so, despite her advice to Raquel not to get mixed up in other people's lives, and despite her husband's misgivings, she invites Luis down to Mexico unbeknownst to Raquel. Arturo and Luis meet, resulting in some tense moments, but they generally get along well, leaving Raquel wondering what is happening.

Finally, Arturo meets Raquel's parents. Arturo finds Raquel's father is amiable but her mother is clearly not. Raquel had by now figured out that her mother asked Luis to come down to Mexico, and a fight between the two ensues. Her mother finally admits that the only reason she's opposed to Arturo is that she's afraid that Raquel, their only daughter, will move to Argentina with Arturo. After Raquel assures her she will not leave her parents alone, her mother has a change of heart. When Luis presents Raquel with tickets to go away for a romantic weekend with him, she tells him that there is no chance. Luis leaves a good-bye note for Raquel and returns to the United States.

Family Problems Arc: Meanwhile, after Don Fernando is transported to Guadalajara to see a medical specialist, a financial irregularity comes to light. Don Fernando's son Carlos has been embezzling money from the family company's office in Miami. It turns out that his wife, Gloria, is a gambling addict and Carlos took the money to bail her out. The whole family company (including the La Gavia ranch) is endangered. Because of this, they close the Miami office and consider selling the ranch. Another monetary difficulty arises, this time between Angela and Roberto, over the fact that she wants to give her part of the money from the sale of their father's home to her Jorge. Avuncular Arturo starts playing mediator and tries to talk them through the situation.

Doubts (Review Arc): Finally, they all meet Don Fernando. It is a happy meeting, though Fernando is near death, so when Don Fernando suddenly walks in on their reunion dinner fully dressed and looking quite a bit stronger, they are all confused. To their amazement, Don Fernando tells them that he doubts their story: he does not believe that Arturo is really his step-son and Angela and Roberto are really his grandchildren. This device gives Raquel an opportunity to review the entire series, which takes four episodes.

At Long Last (Final Arc): At last, Don Fernando is convinced, not just because of Raquel's recounting and documentation, but because Angela produces a matching wedding cup that was passed from Rosario to Angel, to Angela's grandmother, to Angela. Another plot element is tied up when it turns out that Don Fernando has been squirreling away money all along, with the intention of turning the family ranch into an orphanage after his death. Carlos loves kids, having taken care of their kids while Gloria was out gambling, so they name Carlos the leader of the new orphanage.

Finale: To wrap up the series, Arturo expresses his interest to move to Los Angeles to be with Raquel, since he has no family and few friends in Argentina.

== Trivia ==
- Augusto Benedico died before filming was finished; the ending used previously shot footage of Don Fernando.
- Maricarmen, daughter of Ramón and granddaughter of Don Fernando, is the real-life daughter of Liliana Abud.
- Pati's assistant in the theater production in New York City is played by series creator VanPatten.
- Jorge Martínez de Hoyos (playing Pedro) was familiar to American viewers from his role as Mexican villager Hilario in the 1960 film The Magnificent Seven.
- Both Arturo and Luis have the name Arturo in real life.

== Nuevos Destinos ==
A follow-up story, Nuevos Destinos was produced by WGBH and McGraw-Hill for Annenberg in 1997. It revisits the Destinos story six years later as Raquel encounters a new family mystery. The episodes are only 15 minutes long in this sequel, and some major characters from the earlier series, such as Arturo, do not appear outside of flashbacks but may be mentioned or play a role behind the scenes. Nuevos Destinos includes about three hours of video, with an accompanying immersive CD-ROM that allows the user to help Raquel discover what is going on.

== Other versions ==
A French-language version of Destinos was produced as Destinos: Une introduction à l'espagnol, wherein the English-language narration was removed and replaced by French-language narration. This version was broadcast on Télé-Québec, in Quebec, Canada from 1997 to 2001.

== Places featured ==
- Mexico
  - Mexico City
  - Guadalajara
- Spain
  - Sevilla
  - Madrid
- Argentina
  - Buenos Aires
    - La Boca
    - Recoleta
- Puerto Rico
  - San Juan
    - Viejo San Juan
  - Ponce
  - San Germán
    - Universidad Interamericana de Puerto Rico
- United States
  - Miami
  - New York City
  - Los Angeles

== See also ==
- Connect With English
- French in Action
- Fokus Deutsch
