= Departmental Council of Aude =

Departmental legislature in France

Departmental Council of Aude Conseil départemental de l'Aude

Leadership
- President: Hélène Sandragné, PS since 2 July 2020

Structure
- Seats: 38
- Political groups: Government (34): PS (20); DVG (5); LÉ (5); PRG (2); PCF (2); Opposition (4): DVD (3); LR (1); www.aude.fr

The Departmental Council of Aude (French: Conseil Départemental de l'Aude) is the deliberative assembly of the French department of Aude in Occitanie. Its headquarters are in Carcassonne.

== Presidents ==
The president of the Aude departmental council is Hélène Sandragné (PS) since July 2, 2020.

Name	Party	Term	References
Georges Guille	SFIO	1945-1948	
Francis Vals	SFIO	1949-1951	
Georges Guille	SFIO	1951-1973	
Robert Capdeville	PS	1973-1987	
Raymond Courrière	PS	1987-1998	
Marcel Rainaud	PS	1998-2011	
André Viola	PS	2011-2020	
Hélène Sandragné	PS	since 2020	

== Vice-presidents ==
List of vice-presidents of the Aude Departmental Council (as of 2021)
Order	Name	Party	Canton	Delegation
1st	Hervé Baro	UGE	Les Corbières	Territorial solidarities
2nd	Tamara Rivel	UGE	Carcassonne-2	Roads and mobility
3rd	Alain Giniès	UGE	Le Haut-Minervois	Local economy, agriculture and tourism
4th	Valérie Dumontet	UGE	Le Lézignanais	Democracy, youth and international relations
5th	Pierre Durand	UGE	La Région Limouxine	Resources and social dialogue
6th	Chloé Danillon	UGE	La Malepère à la Montagne Noire	Child protection and local social action
7th	Francis Morlon	UGE	Narbonne-1	Ecological transition
8th	Séverine Roger-Mateille	UGE	Les Basses Plaines de l'Aude	Autonomy of the elderly and people with disabilities
9th	Sébastien Gasparini	UGE	Le Lézignanais	Education and colleges
10th	Muriel Cherrier	UGE	La Vallée de l'Orbiel	Social and professional integration
11th	Patrick François	UGE	Narbonne-3	Community life, sport and culture
