= List of French in Action episodes =

This is a list of episodes of the French-language television series French in Action.

== Orientation ==
=== Leçon 1: Orientation ===
An introduction to French in Action: its creation, its components, and its functioning. How to work with the video programs and how to integrate them with the audio and print components. This is the only program in English; the others are entirely in French.

== Planning and Anticipating ==
Greeting and leave-taking; talking about health; expressing surprise; planning and anticipating; expressing decisiveness and indecisiveness. Subject pronouns; masculine and feminine adjectives and nouns; definite and indefinite articles; immediate future; agreement in gender and number; aller; être; present indicative of -er verbs.

=== Leçon 2: Planning and Anticipating I ===
"Lesson 2 takes us from a classroom into the streets of Paris. A young woman named Mireille is hurrying to school. On her way, she exchanges greetings with several friends and acquaintances, a professor, and her Aunt Georgette, all of whom speak French."

=== Leçon 3: Planning and Anticipating II ===
"Back in the French class, the teacher announces that we are going to invent a story of two young people: an American man and a French woman. We'll invent friends and adventures for them. It should be fun and useful for learning French, he says. Let's hope so."

=== Leçon 4: Planning and Anticipating III ===
"What kind of story should we invent to learn French? A novel? A comedy? A detective thriller? In a preview of things to come, we see our young American arriving in France. His companions will take public transportation to a student dorm. He will take a taxi to the Latin Quarter."

== Names and Origins ==
Numbers; expressing age; giving commands; necessity; negation. Numbers 1-29; avoir; avoir in expressions of age; ne ... pas; imperatives of -er verbs; il faut and infinitives.

=== Leçon 5: Names and Origins ===
"Our two characters must have names. She will be Mireille, and he, Robert. She gets working parents and two sisters, one married. Robert is an only child. His mother is French. His parents are divorced, his mother remarried. Robert just may have a few hangups."

== Physical Characteristics ==
Reality and appearance; describing oneself; talking about sports. Numbers 30-100; faire; aimer and faire with sports; questions with intonation, inversion, and est-ce que.

=== Leçon 6: Physical Characteristics I ===
"What will Mireille look like? On the petite side, perhaps, but healthy, athletic, strong; long slender fingers, oval face, long blond hair, blue eyes. She has a quick, lively mind and a certain fondness for poking fun."

=== Leçon 7: Physical Characteristics II ===
"A Portrait of Robert: medium height, slim, athletic. He has a strong chin, brown hair, and dark eyes. He's smart. Maybe just a bit less quick than Mireille, but calmer, more indulgent. What will happen when these two meet? Will they meet?"

== Kinship ==
Talking about family relationships; asking the identity of people and things. Numbers 100-999,000,000; dates; partitive; possessive adjectives.

=== Leçon 8: Kinship ===
"A look at Mireille's family tree. We learn about many relatives, going all the way back to her great grandparents. On an impromptu visit to the family's country house, we meet many of these characters, including Mireille's ten-year-old sister, who has a mind of her own."

== Describing Others ==
Describing others; talking about games; expressing agreement and disagreement; talking about time; talking about the weather. Present tense with il y a ... que and ça fait ... que; possessive and demonstrative adjectives; stressed pronouns; venir; savoir versus connaître.

=== Leçon 9: Describing Others I ===
"Lesson 9 takes us back a few years to vacation time in Brittany. It's raining. Mireille, her sisters and cousins decide to pass the time by playing a game of portraits. The game is interrupted by a minor accident."

=== Leçon 10: Describing Others II ===
"It's a rainy day in Brittany. Mireille, her sisters and cousins tire of their game of portraits and check to see what's playing at the movies. Meanwhile, the sun has come out, and Cécile, moved by the spirit of adventure, goes for a sail."

== Encounters ==
Starting a conversation; talking about seasons and time of day; exclamations; talking about studies; referring to lack and abundance; expressing approval and disapproval; reacting to compliments; expressing politeness. Immediate past with venir de; direct object pronouns; reflexive verbs; imperative and pronouns; demonstrative adjectives and pronouns; interrogative adjectives and pronouns; parler versus dire; imperfect; imperfect of être and avoir.

=== Leçon 11: Encounters I ===
"In Lesson 11, the stage is set for our two heroes to meet. It's a beautiful spring morning. Robert sets off to explore the Latin Quarter, and Mireille, relaxing in the Luxembourg Garden, has an unwelcome encounter."

=== Leçon 12: Encounters II ===
"In Lesson 12, our American, Robert, is exploring the Latin Quarter. He follows some student strikers into the courtyard of the Sorbonne. Mireille, who is on her way to school, ends up by pure chance in the same place."

=== Leçon 13: Encounters III ===
"Our two heroes have just caught each other's eye and stand smiling in the courtyard of the Sorbonne. On an upper floor, Jean-Pierre, the pickup artist, reveals the tricks of his trade to a not-very-appreciative audience.

=== Leçon 14: Encounters IV ===
"Robert and Mireille meet in the courtyard of the Sorbonne. They're getting to know each other, when Mireille realizes that she's late for an appointment. She rushes off, leaving Robert to contemplate the spring day, and write a postcard to his mother."

== Occupations ==
Talking about work; degrees of assent; days and months of the year; buying and spending; approximating; talking about years and centuries. Aller versus venir; prepositions; contractions of definite article with de and à; adverbial pronouns y and en; vouloir, pouvoir; c'est versus il/elle est; ne ... plus, ne ... jamais; pronoun on; indirect object pronouns; formation of adverbs.

=== Leçon 15: Occupations I ===
"Robert is looking for Mireille. Just as he has given up hope, she comes up to him at a café, and they walk again to the Luxembourg Garden. Lo and behold, they discover they have an acquaintance in common. Robert then makes another interesting discovery: Mireille has a younger sister."

=== Leçon 16: Occupations II ===
"Marie-Laure has sent her sister on a wild goose chase. When Mireille returns, Robert tries to persuade her to join him in calling on Madame Courtois. It's just his luck that Mireille has already planned a trip to Chartres. Ever resourceful, Robert has a brainstorm - could he join her?"

=== Leçon 17: Occupations III ===
"Robert and Mireille are talking about family names, like Taylor, that are also names of trades or professions. They compare notes on their childhood ambitions, recalling their dreams of being a fireman, a sailor, a nurse, an actress."

=== Leçon 18: Occupations IV ===
"Robert and Mireille are sharing stories of people they know who have ended up not doing quite what they had originally planned. As they muse about the twists and turns of fate, Mireille wants to know what Robert intends to do. Invite her for a drink, that's what!"

== Education ==
Identification and description; talking about occupations; talking back; excusing oneself; expressing incredulity. Passé composé; plaire; negation with jamais, rien, personne; mettre, boire; passé composé and direct object pronouns; savoir and infinitives; agreement of past participle with avoir.

=== Leçon 19: Education I ===
"Robert and Mireille are having an aperitif and discussing their high school days. After years of hard study at high school, Mireille is delighted to be at the university. She's especially enthusiastic about one of her art history teachers. Robert is not amused."

=== Leçon 20: Education II ===
"Robert and Mireille are talking about school. Robert, no doubt trying to impress Mireille, launches into a wholesale condemnation of the educational system. He has taken a leave of absence from college to 'find himself.' 'Poor thing,' says Mireille, 'were you lost?'"

=== Leçon 21: Education III ===
"Over their third aperitif, Robert and Mireille are discussing education. Robert dismisses school learning as useless. Mireille springs to the defense of education and culture. Neither seems to notice that a strange man in black has taken an interest in their conversation."

== Getting Around ==
Using the telephone; receiving invitations; expressing optimism and pessimism. Passé composé of reflexive verbs; passé composé with être; agreement of past participles; future.

=== Leçon 22: Getting Around I ===
"It's noon-time, and Mireille has left Robert to return home for lunch. After several unsuccessful attempts, Robert finally manages to place a telephone call to Madame Courtois. She's a great talker, and Robert can't get a word in edgewise, but he does get an invitation for dinner."

=== Leçon 23: Getting Around II ===
"Robert has been invited to dinner at the Courtois', and he tries to convince Mireille to get herself invited too. Mireille doesn't commit herself, and Robert spends the next forty-eight hours wondering if she'll be there. He then gets hopelessly lost trying to get to the Courtois' apartment."

== Food and Drink ==
Talking about food and drink; ordering in a restaurant; thanking hosts. Future of irregular verbs; relative pronouns qui and que; imperative with direct and indirect object pronouns; position of en with object pronouns; ne ... que; expressions of quantity; vowel change e/è.

=== Leçon 24: Food and Drink I ===
"Robert arrives at the Courtois' apartment - no Mireille. Then a moment later, she shows up. The dinner is delicious, but Robert is a little irritated by Monsieur Courtois' fixation on gastronomy. He'd love to take Mireille home, but all he can do is ask for her phone number."

=== Leçon 25: Food and Drink II ===
"It's morning. Robert gets up, has breakfast, and sets out to explore Paris. He visits an open air market near his hotel, then crosses the Seine to the Right Bank. He ends up at a restaurant, where he is distracted by a scene between a fussy customer and a hapless waiter."

=== Leçon 26: Food and Drink III ===
"In a good restaurant, Robert notices a young couple at a nearby table. She is blond and Robert thinks she may be Mireille, but he can't tell. The chef has named several dishes after an old girlfriend of his, another Mireille, who died of ingestion. Touching!"

(Note: the couple in question are Mireille's sister Cecilé and her husband Jean-Denis.)

== Transportation and Travel ==
Expressing fear; insisting; talking about means of transportation; talking about cars; expressing admiration; making suggestions. Pluperfect; conditional; conditional and imperfect; past conditional; compound tenses and past participles; agreement of past participles; expressions of time.

=== Leçon 27: Transportation and Travel I ===
"Mireille is going to Chartres, and Robert invites himself along. Robert nearly gets lost in the Métro, on his way to meet Mireille at the station, but they board the train on time. On the way, Mireille suggest that they use the familiar tu. Progress!"

=== Leçon 28: Transportation and Travel II ===
"The train arrive in Chartres right on time. Robert and Mireille have a bite to eat, and then visit the cathedral together. Robert is deeply moved by the beauty of the place and of his companion. But when she leaves briefly to visit a nearby museum, he imagines he's being betrayed."

=== Leçon 29: Transportation and Travel III ===
"Returning to Paris, Robert and Mireille get seats on a crowded train, unaware that they are sharing the compartment with a mysterious man in black. Tonight, Mireille must visit a friend in Saint Germaine, tomorrow one in Provin. Robert, ever jealous, spends hours trying to find her."

=== Leçon 30: Transportation and Travel IV ===
"Robert is determined to find Mireille. He rents a car and gets directions to Provins. But he turns to follow a sports car driven by a young woman who might be Mireille. By the time he realizes his mistake, he is 300 kilometers off course, lost in the wine country of Burgundy."

=== Leçon 31: Transportation and Travel V ===
"Mireille arranges to borrow a car from her uncle to visit a friend in Provin. When it won't start, the garage man lends her a lemon, which gives her all kinds of trouble. Back home, she tries to call Robert, but he's still out doing research on the fine wines of Burgundy."

== Habitat ==
Asking one's way; talking about housing; protesting; expressing satisfaction and dissatisfaction. Imperfect and passé composé; irregular imperatives; causative faire; faire versus rendre; en and present participle; ni ... ni.

=== Leçon 32: Habitat I ===
"Mireille's parents have invited Robert for dinner. He finds the Belleau apartment with a little help from someone who turns out to be a TV weatherman. He gets a guided tour. Mireille warns Robert that another friend, the super-aristocratic Hubert, is yet to come."

=== Leçon 33: Habitat II ===
"At the Belleau's dinner table, Hubert is doing his aristocratic number when the conversation turns to low-rent housing for workers. When Hubert says that "those people" were no worse off a hundred years ago without modern conveniences, Robert explodes."

=== Leçon 34: Habitat III ===
"More table talk about real estate and the ruined farmhouse the Belleaus have fixed up as a country home. The doorbell rings, and Marie-Laure is sent to see who it is. She returns with a story about a fake nun with a big mustache selling raffle tickets."

=== Leçon 35: Habitat IV ===
"The doorbell again! Marie-Laure reports that it was a man in black asking if she had a sister who looked like an actress. She sent him away, and Mireille is outraged. Maybe that was her big chance. Meanwhile, Robert tries in vain to arrange room and board at the Belleaus.

== Entertainment ==
Talking about entertainment; calming others down; expressing restriction; expressing reservations; expressing doubt; expressing enthusiasm. Indefinite expressions; subjunctive; subjunctive of irregular verbs; subjunctive with falloir and expressions of doubt; position of souvent, toujours, jamais; verbs in -yer; personne and rien as subjects and objects.

=== Leçon 36: Entertainment I ===
"After the after-dinner drinks, everyone says goodnight except Mireille and Robert. They decide, after consulting the entertainment guides, to see the film Love in the Afternoon the following day, in the afternoon. They arrange to meet at a café near the movie theater."

=== Leçon 37: Entertainment II ===
"Waiting at a café near the movie theater, Mireille notices a man in black behaving strangely nearby. Robert is almost on time. He's impatient with the commercial stuff that precedes the movie, and love in the afternoon turns out to be much closer to PG than to R."

=== Leçon 38: Entertainment III ===
"After the movie, Robert and Mireille wander toward the Champs-Élysées. Robert thinks he has lost his passport. They discuss cinema. Mireille prefers action on the screen, and she admires some of the old silents. A rude soldier on furlough falls, in a way, for Mireille."

=== Leçon 39: Entertainment IV ===
"In a café, Mireille and Robert talk about the many theaters of Paris. Hubert and Jean-Pierre appear by coincidence, invite themselves to sit down, and contribute their strong opinions to the discussion. And here's that strange man in black, behaving strangely again."

=== Leçon 40: Entertainment V ===
"Our four characters discuss theatrical forms (stage versus film, immediacy versus permanence, etc.), while the man in black sends signals by Morse code with his eyes. Jean-Pierre argues the merits of the circus. The strange nun replaces the strange man."

== Getting and Spending ==
Talking about money; buying and selling; announcing good and bad news; expressing indifference; talking about good and bad luck; expressing preference. Subjunctive in conditional sentences with conjunctions in relative clauses; personne and rien with compound tenses; position of déjà and encore; plus rien, jamais rien; comparatives and superlatives; superlative and subjunctive; relative pronouns ce qui, ce que; demonstrative pronouns.

=== Leçon 41: Getting and Spending I ===
"Robert gets stuck with a café tab. As he is paying, the waiter's tray drops, and Robert learns that in France broken glass brings good luck. So Robert and Mireille buy a lottery ticket that is sure to be a winner. Thursday's paper will tell them how much they won."

=== Leçon 42: Getting and Spending II ===
"They won the lottery - 40,000 francs! But how to spend it? Robert wants to travel around France. Mireille won't commit herself, but she agrees to look at camping equipment. They hail a taxi, but the man in black, already inside, tries to pull Mireille in."

=== Leçon 43: Getting and Spending III ===
"Robert and Mireille look at camping gear. Robert stays in the department store to buy clothing, and Mireille rushes off to have lunch with Hubert. She runs into the incorrigible Jean-Pierre, and they talk about broken glass, spilled salt, and other superstitions."

=== Leçon 44: Getting and Spending IV ===
"Mireille tells Hubert she's won the lottery. He strongly disapproves of the lottery, although he has been known to play the horses. Robert and a shoe salesman have a misunderstanding about sizes, and Aunt Georgette tells the story of the one that got away."

=== Leçon 45: Getting and Spending V ===
"Uncle Guillaume urges Mireille to spend her lottery money on memorable meals, but Mireille prefers Robert's plan to travel around France. Robert continues to have misunderstandings with salesmen, this time about underwear, and he takes a hair-raising taxi ride."

== Geography and Tourism ==
Talking about countries and regions; exaggerating; confirming; insisting; expressing perplexity. Conditional in intentional expressions; dont; pronoun tout; possessive pronouns; irregular subjunctives; subjunctive in subordinate clauses; future in the past; penser de versus penser à; articles and prepositions with geographical names.

=== Leçon 46: Geography and Tourism I ===
"Hubert offers his little car, and himself, for the trip around France. Collette agrees to be a fourth. Then Mireille invites another friend, the leftist Jean-Michel. After a lot of fast talking, she gets everyone to accept what promises to be a crowded and argumentative quintet."

=== Leçon 47: Geography and Tourism II ===
"Our travelers are discussing where to go and what to see in France. Sparks fly between the right-wing Hubert and the radical Jean-Michel. Bicycles might be better than a crowded car. The tentative decision? A reverse Tour de France, starting in Normandy, where the food is excellent."

=== Leçon 48: Geography and Tourism III ===
"Our travelers continue discussing their itinerary. It's possible to tour France by water, through coastal waters, rivers, and canals. Hubert and Jean-Michel disagree about the real France, and the man in black comes to the front door with an odd story about returning Marie-Laure's gumdrop."

=== Leçon 49: Geography and Tourism IV ===
"Marie-Laure has gone out and not returned. Mireille panics. She and Robert search in vain, but Marie-Laure finally comes back. She tells a wild tale of following a fugitive man in black, then losing him in the Catacombs of Paris. Mireille doesn't believe a word."

=== Leçon 50: Geography and Tourism V ===
"Our five travelers resume discussion of their itinerary. They need a theme: chateaux, churches, regional specialties? They fail to reach a consensus, but mention of the cider of Normandy awakens their thirst, and they adjourn to a nearby café."

== Getting Away ==
Referring to destination; levels of speech. Negative infinitive; imperatives and pronouns.

=== Leçon 51: Getting Away I ===
"All the bit players pass by, from Uncle Guillaume, who has lost his fortune, to Aunt Georgette, who has won a pile in the lottery. She is off to the Taj Mahal with the one that got away. The man in black leaves some tantalizing notes about Mireille."

=== Leçon 52: Getting Away II ===
"Underway at last! But the man in black is following, and Mireille and Robert leave their friends and try in vain to lose him. Robert is hurt in a fall, and Mireille endangered by fire, but all ends well, and that's, well, oh, good. Anyway, not bad."
