= Mireille Robert =

French politician

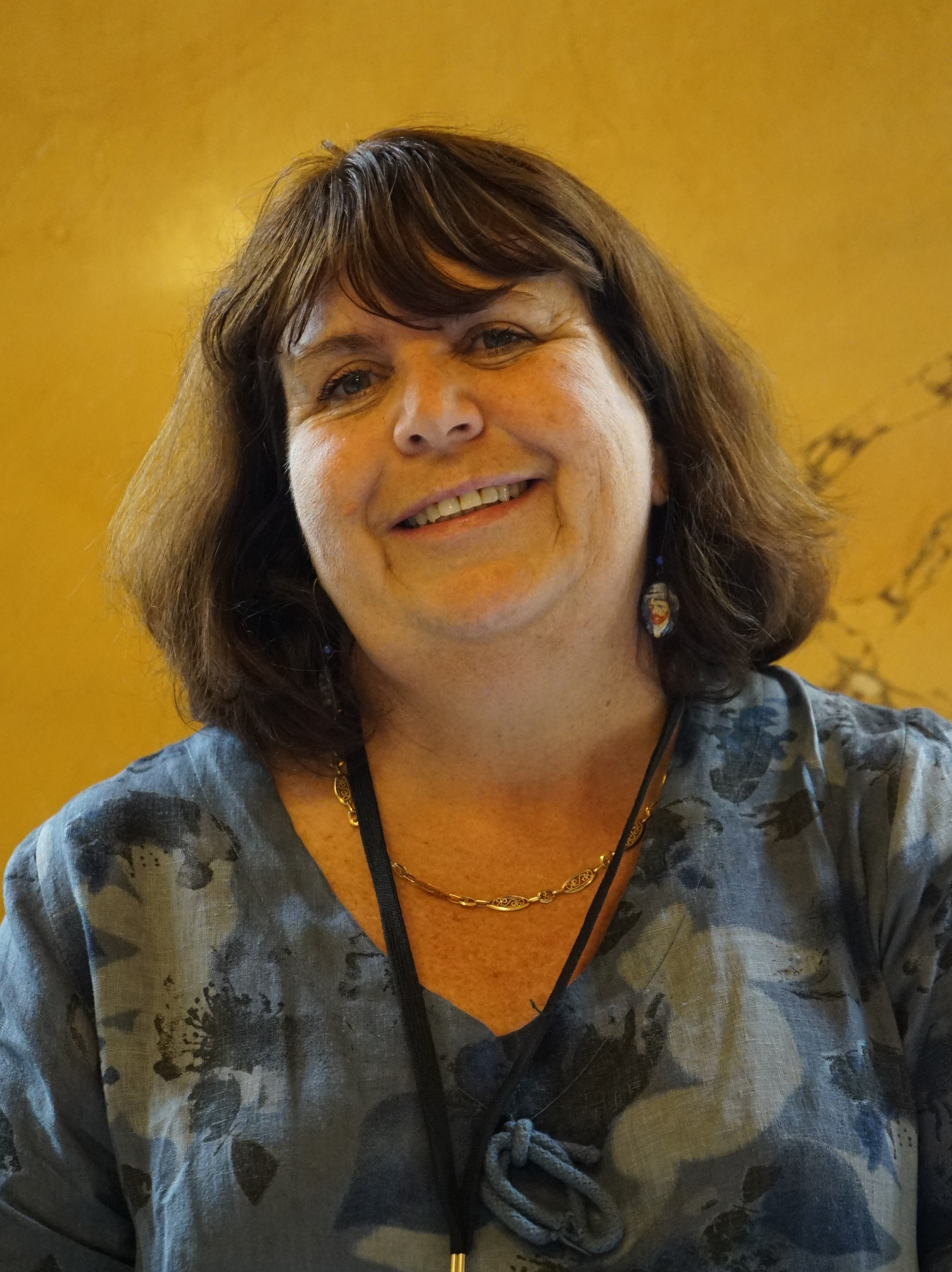

Member of the French National Assembly for Aude's 3rd constituency
- In office 21 June 2017 – 21 June 2022
- Preceded by: Jean-Paul Dupré
- Succeeded by: Julien Rancoule

Personal details
- Born: 1 March 1962 (age 64) Orthez, France
- Party: En Marche!
- Profession: School Teacher

Mireille Robert (born 1 March 1962) is a French politician representing La République En Marche! She was elected to the French National Assembly on 18 June 2017, representing Aude's 3rd constituency.

She lost her seat in the first round of the 2022 French legislative election.

== See also ==
- 2017 French legislative election
