= Jamais deux sans toi...t =

- Also known as: Jamais 2 sans toi...t
- Genre: Sitcom
- Created by: Alexandre Denim; Éric Assous
- Country of origin: France
- Original language: French
- No. of seasons: 2
- No. of episodes: 132

Original release
- Network: TF1
- Release: 1 July 1996 – 1997

Jamais deux sans toi...t (French for "Never two without you/roof") is a French sitcom which was broadcast in 1996 and 1997.

== Guest ==
- Pascale Roberts : Margot (5 Episodes)
- Franck de la Personne : Didier Sacha (3 Episodes)
