= Frédéric Falcon =

French businessman and politician

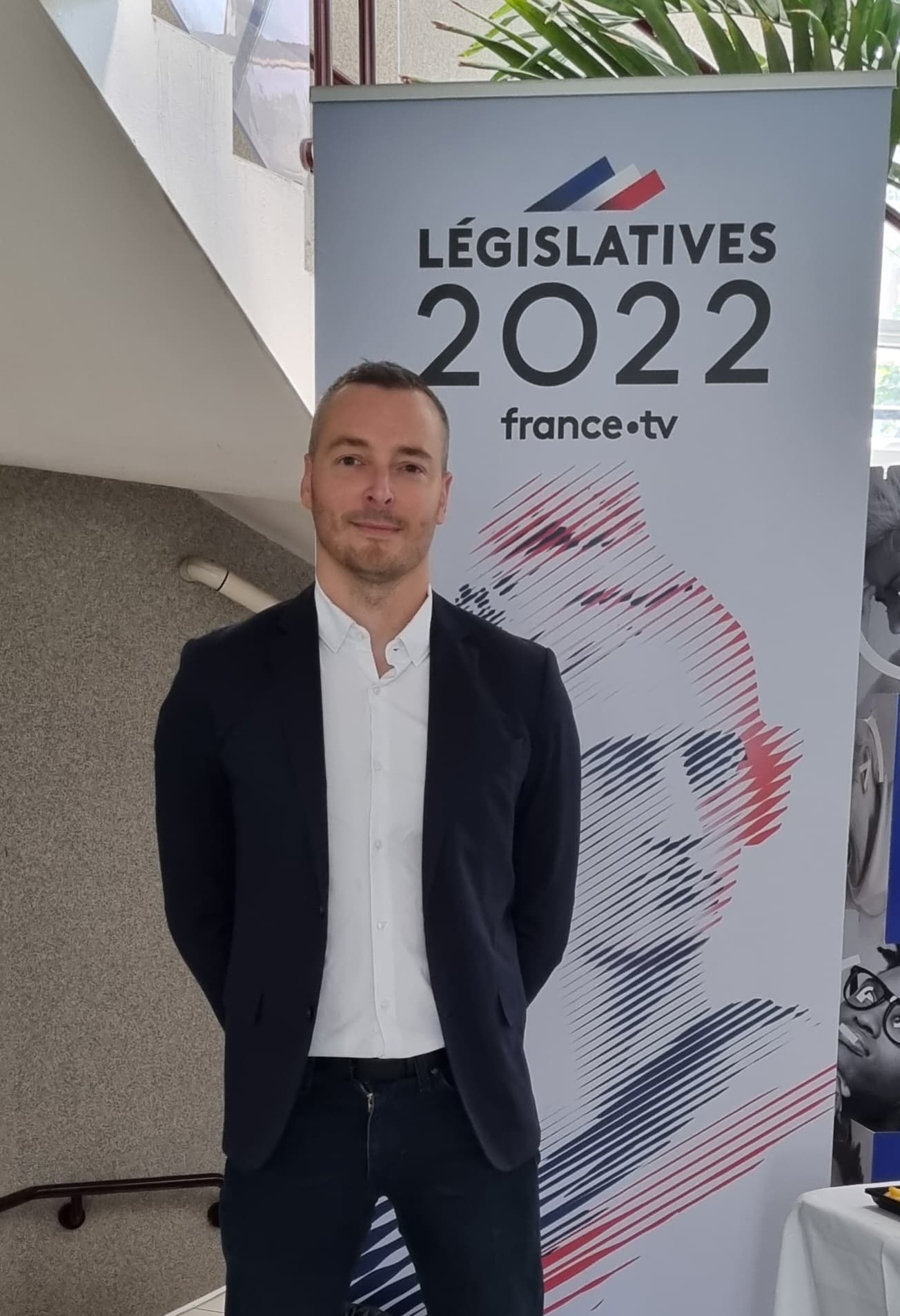

Member of the National Assembly for Aude's 2nd constituency
- Incumbent
- Assumed office 22 June 2022
- Preceded by: Alain Perea

Personal details
- Born: 21 November 1985 (age 40) Besançon, France
- Party: National Rally (2017-present)
- Other political affiliations: Union for a Popular Movement (before 2014)
- Occupation: Consultant, politician

Frédéric Falcon (born 21 November 1985) is a French businessman and politician of the National Rally. He was elected as a deputy for the National Assembly representing Aude's 2nd constituency during the 2022 French legislative election.

== Biography ==
Falcon was born in Besançon in 1985. He stated that he often moved due to his father's career in the military but has family connections to Narbonne. Falcon studied history and geography at university in Doubs before completing Master's degrees in geopolitics and heritage management. He worked for Capgemini in Paris before starting a real-estate business and became a business consultant in the property sector.

== Political career ==
Falcon joined the Union for a Popular Movement as a student and canvassed for the party. He left the UMP in 2014 after disagreeing with its course. He joined the National Rally in 2017 through Sébastien Chenu. Ahead of the 2022 French legislative election, he was selected to stand in Aude's 2nd constituency and made it to the second round of voting. He subsequently unseated the incumbent deputy Alain Perea to win the seat and was one of three FN deputies to represent all of Aude's constituencies.
