= Club de rencontres =

1987 film by Michel Lang

- Directed by: Michel Lang
- Written by: Michel Lang
- Produced by: Alain Terzian
- Cinematography: Daniel Gaudry
- Edited by: Hélène Plemiannikov
- Music by: Michel Legrand
- Release date: 4 March 1987
- Running time: 102 minutes
- Country: France
- Language: French

Club de rencontres is a 1987 French comedy film directed and written by Michel Lang. The film stars Francis Perrin.

== Cast ==
- Francis Perrin... Nicolas Bergereau
- Jean-Paul Comart ... Bernard Lognon
- Valérie Allain ... Christiane, dite Cricri
- Isabelle Mergault ... Bunny
- Herma Vos ... Jutta
- Blanche Ravalec ... Marion
- Anne Deleuze ... Agnès Bergereau
- Jean Rougerie ... Le voisin colérique
- Charles Gérard ... Le commissaire
- Henri Guybet ... L'inspecteur Etienne Gandin
- Caroline Jacquin... Yveline, la secrétaire
- Gaëlle Legrand ... Marie-Solange, l'ex de Bernard
- Léon Spigelman ... Sammy Blumenstrauss
- Katia Tchenko ... Paméla, la nymphomane
- Michel Crémadès ... Garazzi, le violeur
- Andrée Damant ... The lady
- Louba Guertchikoff ... Rachel Blumenstrauss
- Fernand Guiot ... Le patron de l'agence immobilière
