= Pierre Capretz =

French educator and writer

- Born: Pierre Jean Capretz; 30 January 1925; Mazamet, France
- Died: 1 April 2014 (aged 89); Aix-en-Provence, France
- Education: University of Paris
- Scientific career
- Fields: French
- Workplaces: University of Florida, Yale University

Pierre Jean Capretz (30 January 1925 – 2 April 2014) was a French educator and writer, noted for his audio-visual methods for teaching French. A graduate of the University of Paris, he began teaching French in 1949 at the University of Florida and joined the faculty of Yale University in 1956, eventually becoming Director of the Language Laboratory and then Director of the Language Development Studio. He is best known as the creator and host of the PBS television series French in Action. He received an honorary Doctor of Letters from Middlebury College in August 1993. He died in 2014 at the age of 89.

== List of degrees received ==
- Doctorate, University of Paris, 1950
- Law Degree, University of Paris, 1947
- Doctor of Letters, Honoris Causa, Middlebury College, 1993

== Bibliography ==
- Hodge, Deborah (Autumn 1993). Introduction, "A Banner Year for the Language Schools", Middlebury Magazine.
