= Jacques Bascou =

French politician

Jacques Bascou (born 13 March 1953 in Castelnaudary, Aude) was a member of the National Assembly of France and represented Aude's 2nd constituency from 1997 to 2012. The mayor of Narbonne, he is a member of the Socialist Party and belongs to the SRC parliamentary group.
