= Saint-Nazaire-de-Ladarez =

- Commune
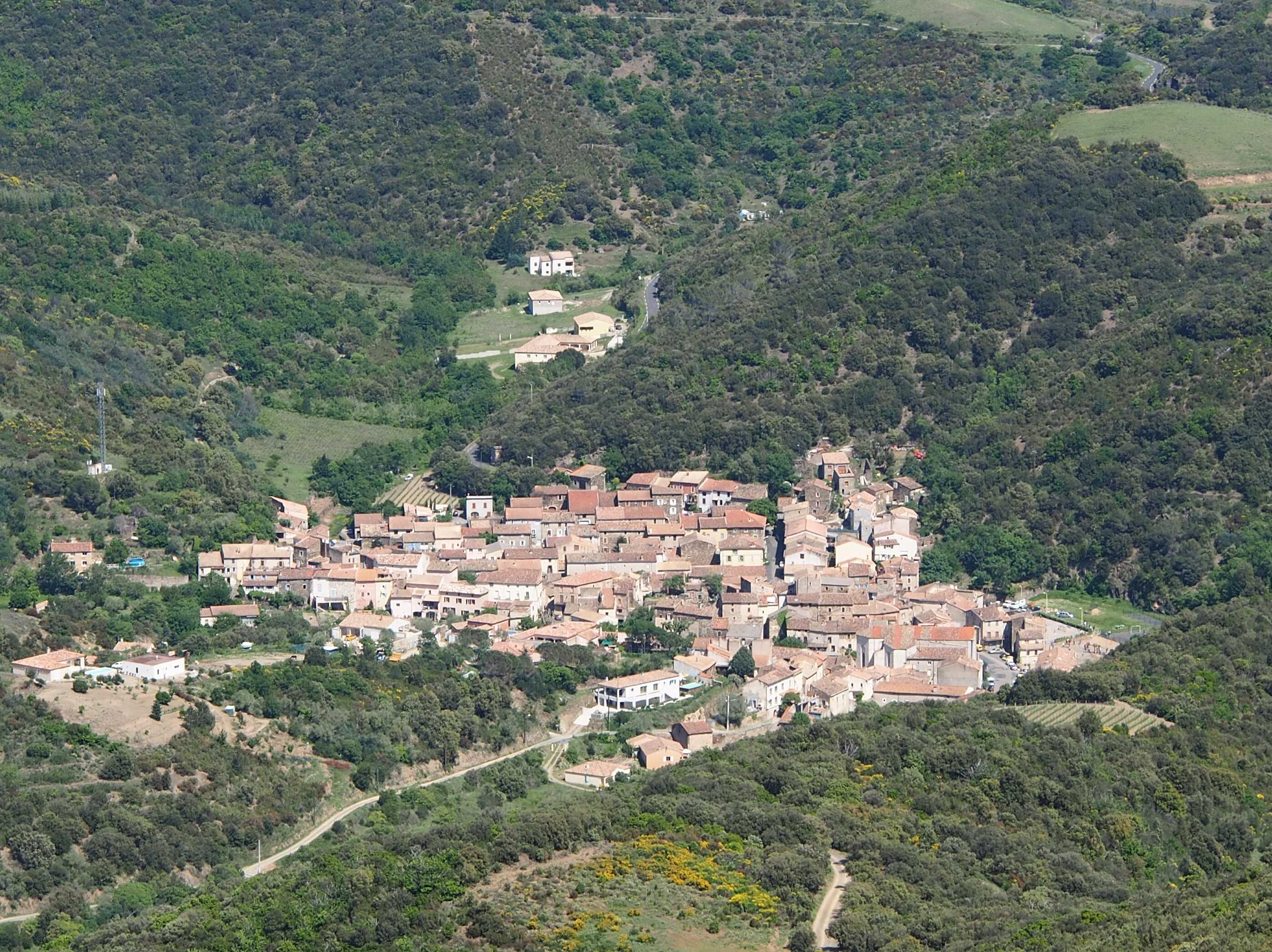
- A general view of Saint-Nazaire-de-Ladarez

- Coat of arms
- Location of Saint-Nazaire-de-Ladarez
- Location within France Location within Occitanie
- Coordinates: 43°30′37″N 3°04′36″E
- Country: France
- Region: Occitania
- Department: Hérault
- Arrondissement: Béziers
- Canton: Cazouls-lès-Béziers
- Intercommunality: CC Les Avant-Monts

Government
  - Mayor (2020–2026): Sylvie Milhau-Lermet
- Area^{1}: 28.27 km^{2} (10.92 sq mi)
- Elevation: 200 m (660 ft)
- Highest elevation: 690 m (2,260 ft)
- Lowest elevation: 110 m (360 ft)
- Population (2023): 327
  - Density: 11.6/km^{2} (30.0/sq mi)
- Time zone: UTC+01:00 (CET)
  - Summer (DST): UTC+02:00 (CEST)
- INSEE/Postal code: 34279 /34490
- ^{1} French Land Register data, which excludes lakes, ponds, glaciers > 1 km^{2} (0.386 sq mi or 247 acres) and river estuaries.

Saint-Nazaire-de-Ladarez is a commune in the Hérault department in the Occitanie region in southern France.

== Population ==
Historical population
Year	Pop.	±% p.a.
1968	465	—
1975	379	−2.88%
1982	345	−1.33%
1990	361	+0.57%
1999	331	−0.96%
2007	358	+0.99%
2012	351	−0.39%
2017	354	+0.17%
2023	327	−1.31%
Source: INSEE

== Personalities related to the commune ==
- Madeleine Laissac was mayor of the commune from 1947 to 1971.

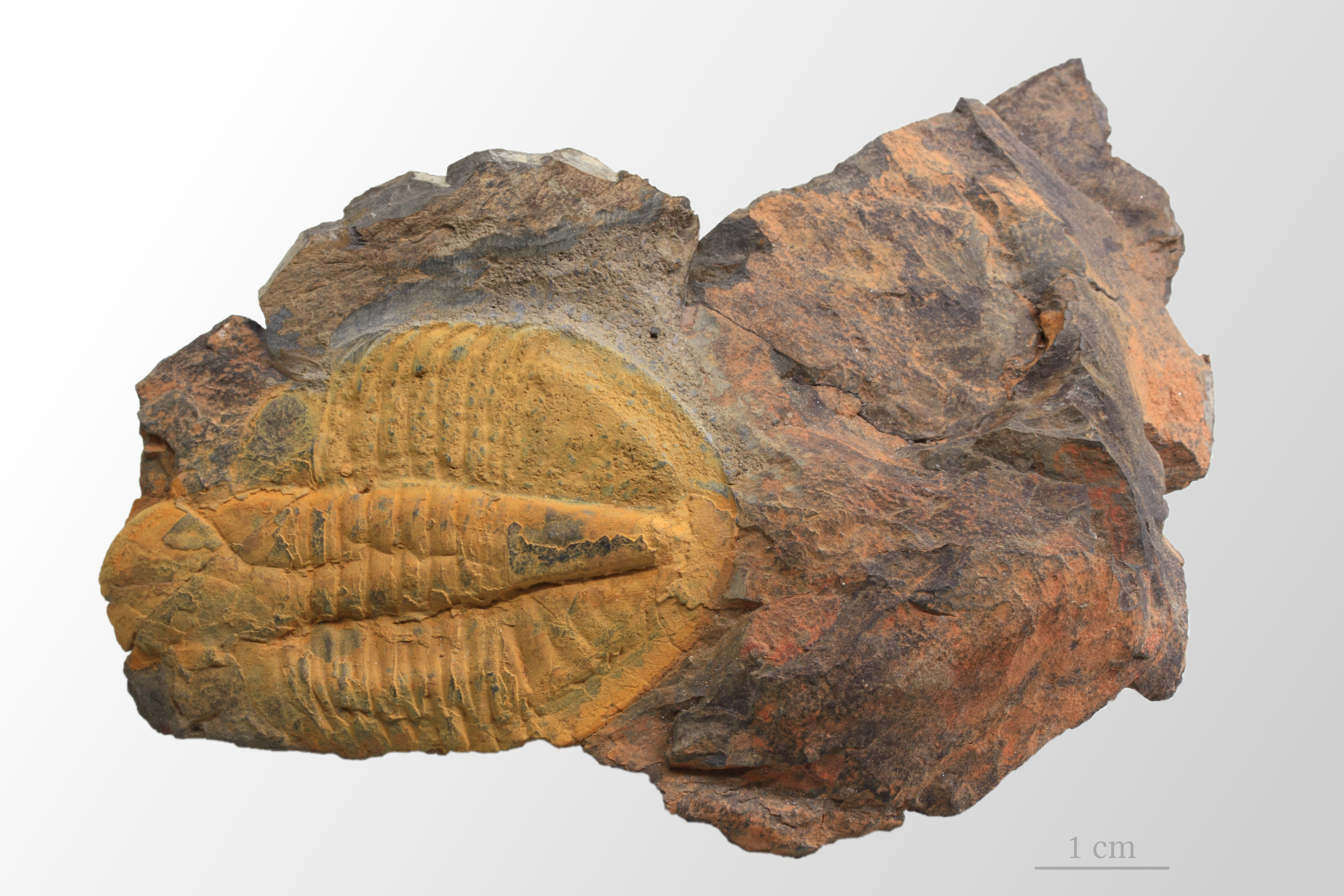
Niobella fourneti found in Saint-Nazaire-de-Ladarez

== See also ==
- Communes of the Hérault department
