= Jean-Paul Dupré =

French politician

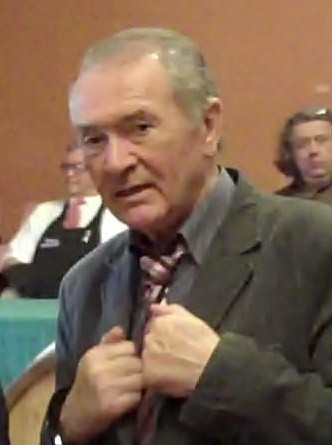
Jean-Paul Dupré

Jean-Paul Dupré (born 5 February 1944 in Davejean, Aude) French millionaire, member of the National Assembly of France from 1997 to 2017. He represented Aude's 3rd constituency, as a member of the Socialist Party and of the Socialiste, radical, citoyen et divers gauche parliamentary group. He is the mayor of Limoux.
