= Talairan =

Commune in Occitanie, France

- Commune
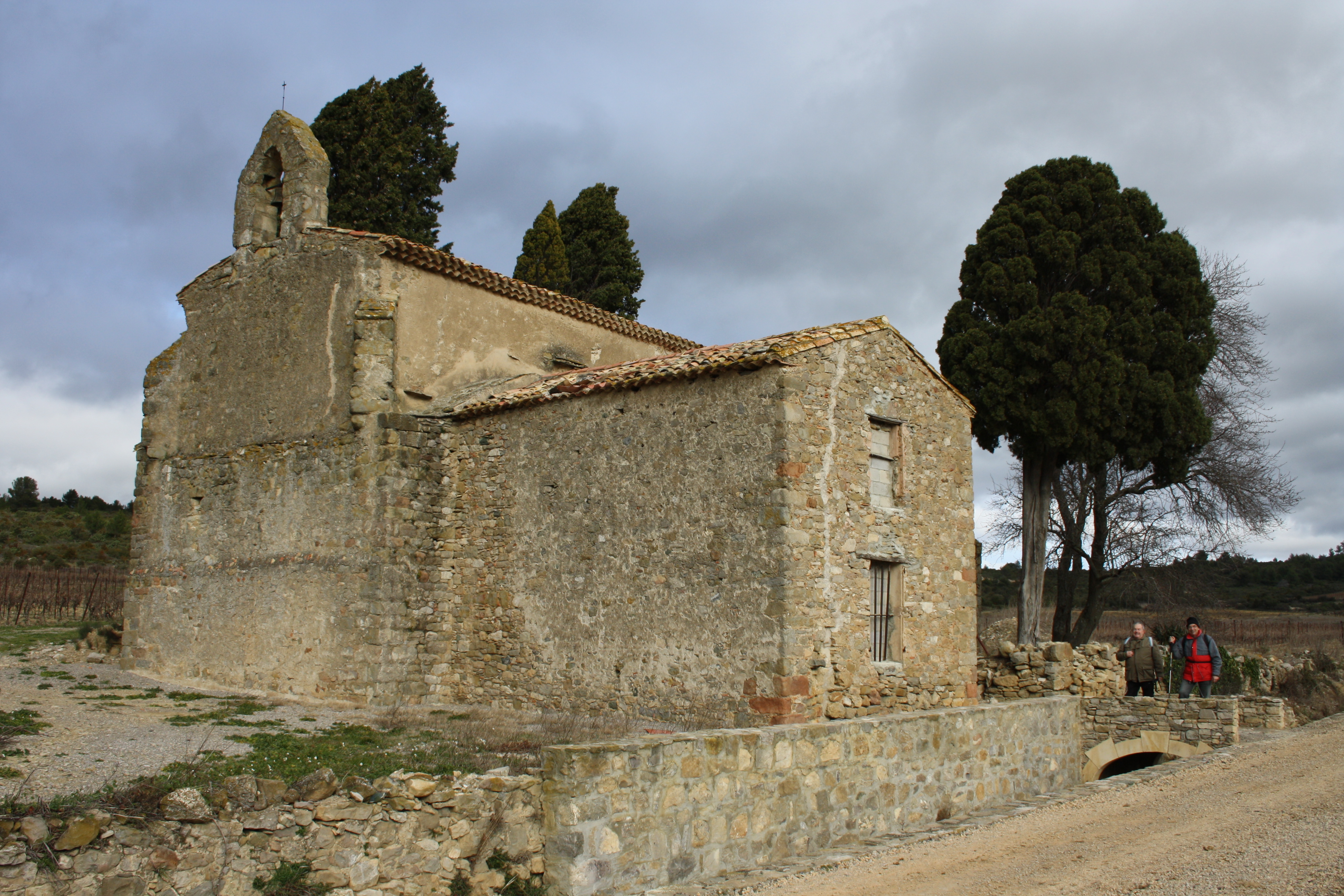
- The chapel in Talairan

- Coat of arms
- Location of Talairan
- Location within France Location within Occitanie
- Coordinates: 43°03′09″N 2°39′50″E
- Country: France
- Region: Occitania
- Department: Aude
- Arrondissement: Narbonne
- Canton: Les Corbières
- Intercommunality: Région Lézignanaise, Corbières et Minervois

Government
  - Mayor (2020–2026): Cedric Malric
- Area^{1}: 36.29 km^{2} (14.01 sq mi)
- Elevation: 181 m (594 ft)
- Highest elevation: 597 m (1,959 ft)
- Lowest elevation: 132 m (433 ft)
- Population (2023): 440
  - Density: 12/km^{2} (31/sq mi)
- Time zone: UTC+01:00 (CET)
  - Summer (DST): UTC+02:00 (CEST)
- INSEE/Postal code: 11386 /11220
- ^{1} French Land Register data, which excludes lakes, ponds, glaciers > 1 km^{2} (0.386 sq mi or 247 acres) and river estuaries.

Talairan (French pronunciation: [talɛʁɑ̃]) is a commune in the Aude department in southern France.

== Population ==
Historical population
Year	Pop.	±% p.a.
1968	475	—
1975	382	−3.06%
1982	370	−0.45%
1990	369	−0.03%
1999	349	−0.62%
2007	360	+0.39%
2012	384	+1.30%
2017	467	+3.99%
2023	440	−0.99%
Source: INSEE

== See also ==
- Corbières AOC
- Communes of the Aude department
