= Marcel Rainaud =

French politician (1940–2020)

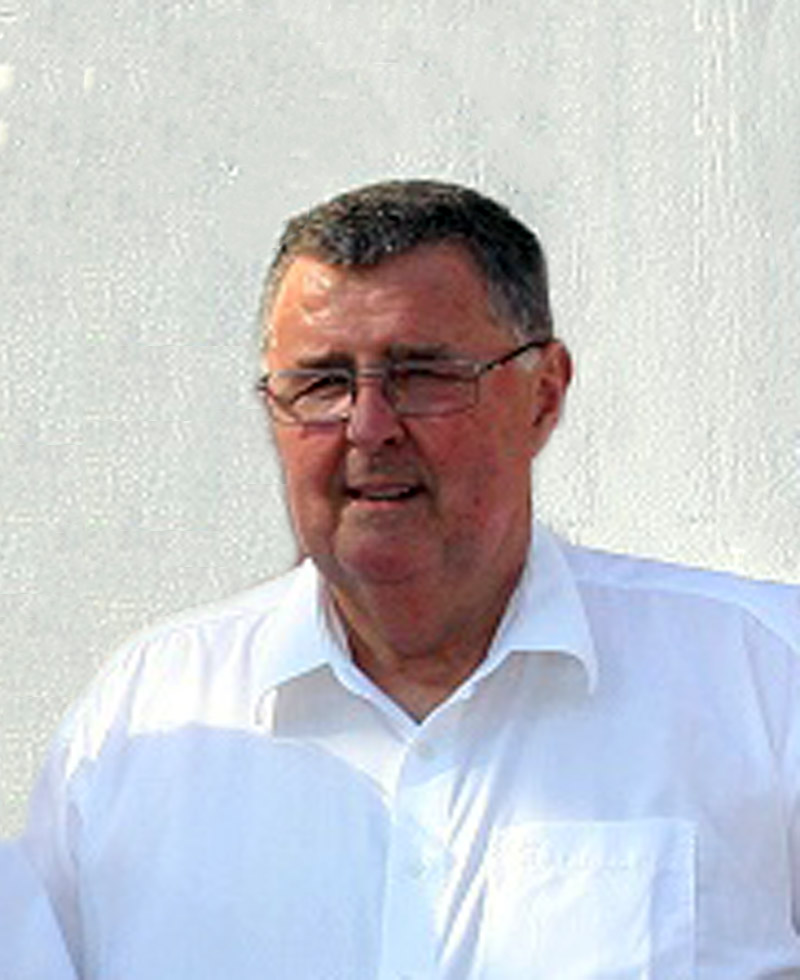
- Marcel Rainaud

Senator, French Senate
- In office 12 August 2006 – 30 September 2014
- Constituency: Aude

Personal details
- Born: April 1, 1940 Talairan, France
- Died: April 10, 2020 (aged 80)
- Party: Socialist
- Occupation: Teacher

Marcel Rainaud (1 April 1940 – 10 April 2020) was a member of the Senate of France, representing the Aude department as a member of the Socialist Party.

He entered the Senate in August 2006, following the death of Raymond Courrière. Before serving in the Senate, he was a Municipal Councillor, and Mayor of the Commune of Talairan.
