= French in Action =

- Mireille Belleau and Robert Taylor at La Closerie des Lilas
- Genre: Educational television series Romantic comedy
- Created by: Pierre Capretz
- Starring: Valérie Allain; Charles Mayer; Virginie Contesse; Pierre Capretz
- Country of origin: United States
- Original language: French
- No. of episodes: 52 (list of episodes)

Production
- Producers: WGBH, Yale University, and Wellesley College
- Camera setup: Single-camera
- Running time: 30 minutes per episode

Original release
- Network: WGBH, PBS
- Release: 1987 – 2016

French in Action is a French language course, developed by Professor Pierre Capretz of Yale University. The course includes workbooks, textbooks, and a 52-episode television series.

The television series — the best-known aspect of the course — was produced in 1987 by WGBH, Yale University, and Wellesley College, and funded by Annenberg/CPB, and since then, has been aired frequently on PBS in the United States, developing a cult following for its romantic comedy segments interspersed among grammar and vocabulary lessons.

In 2010, Yale University hosted a 25th anniversary reunion in celebration of the programme's success.

== Origins ==
During the Second World War, Yale Professor Emeritus of Romance Languages Jean Boorsch, had produced for the American ASTP (Army Specialized Training Program) and the Navy V-12s (V-12 Navy College Training Program) an approach to oral French learning. He used a language immersion technique that he published in 1944 as the "Méthode Orale de Français". It had two main characters Mireille and Robert. Between 1960 and 1961, Boorsch and Capretz worked on an oral teaching method (never published) in which they retained the names of these two characters.

Capretz maintained these names in tribute to the "Method Boorsch" in each of the versions of his own "methods" before developing his French in Action course. He had the opportunity to progressively develop the characters themselves during this evolution.

== Cast ==
- Pierre J. Capretz - Narrator
- Valérie Allain - Mireille
- Charles Mayer - Robert
- Virginie Contesse - Marie-Laure
- Julie Arnold - Cécile
- Patrice Bachelot - Jean-Luc
- Franck de la Personne - Hubert
- Jean-Claude Cotillard - Mime/Homme en Noir
- Riton Liebman - Jean-Pierre Bourdon
- Mohamed Camara - Ousmane

== Format ==
Each episode is half an hour long. Early episodes have four main elements:

- a classroom session, featuring Capretz explaining the basic ideas of the episode to a group of international students
- an excerpt from an ongoing story, filmed especially for the series, and framed as a narrative that Capretz and his students are inventing in order to practice their French. The story focuses on American student Robert Taylor (Charles Mayer) and his French love interest Mireille Belleau (Valérie Allain).
- clips from French films and television shows, illustrating the new vocabulary words of the lesson
- a brief Guignol-style puppet show recapping some element of the episode's story (filmed at the Théâtre Vrai Guignolet at Champs-Élysées)

In later episodes the introductory classroom segment is omitted, and the episode begins immediately with an excerpt from the ongoing story.

The series uses context and repetition, rather than translation, to teach the meanings of words. With the exception of a brief English-language introduction at the beginning of each episode, the series is conducted entirely in French.

== TV and movie clips ==
Some of the sources for French TV and movie clips

=== TV shows ===
- Merci Sylvestre
- Papa Poule
- Marie Pervenche
- Allo Beatrice
- Tout comme un homme
- Hélas Alice est lasse
- Le tueur est parmi nous
- Paris-Saint-Lazare
- L'héritage

=== Films ===
- Le Maestro
- Le Cœur dans les nuages
- Le locataire d'en haut
- Connaissez-vous Maronne?
- La boucle d'oreille
- L'ennemi public
- Folie douce
- Une dernière fois Catherine
- Taxinoia
- Le passé à venir (Thierry Martenet)
- La France rêvée
- Visite au château (Jacques Deschamps)
- Ballades (Catherine Corsini)
- Voyage à Deauville (Jacques Duron)

== Controversy ==
In early 1990, three female students at Yale University filed a grievance claiming that the university's introductory French course was sexist in its use of the French in Action television series. In particular, the students objected to watching a scene in which the character Jean-Pierre harasses Mireille as she sits in a park and then being required to "pretend you were trying to pick up a pretty woman in a park". Some also objected to camera angles focusing on Mireille's legs, or breasts when she isn't wearing a bra.

Its creator, Capretz, a French native who taught at Yale from 1956 to 2003, said he "wouldn't change any of it". To teach French effectively, he said, "you have to make the students observe the language being used by native speakers, in real situations. […] Nothing we show is going to shock anybody in France."

In response, the French department at Yale determined that the course would be changed by developing supplementary materials to be used in the course. However, the television programs themselves were not altered.

== See also ==
- Connect With English
- Fokus Deutsch
- Destinos
