= Régis Barailla =

French politician

- Born: 28 August 1933; Albas, Aude, France
- Died: 21 September 2016 (aged 83); Tuchan, Aude, France
- Occupation: Politician
- Political party: Socialist Party

Régis Barailla (28 August 1933 – 21 September 2016) was a French politician. He served as a member of the National Assembly from 1983 to 1993.
