= Hunab Ku =

Mayan deity

- Creator deity
- Other names: Junab K'uj
- Gender: Male
- Region: Maya region
- Consort: Ixchel

Equivalents
- Aztec: Ometeotl
- Canaanite: El
- Christian: God
- Greek: Phanes
- Hindu: Brahma
- Manipuri: Sidaba Mapu
- Norse: Ymir
- Muisca: Chiminigagua

Hunab Ku (Mayan pronunciation: [huˈnaɓ kʼu], standard Yucatec Mayan orthography: Junab K'uj) is a colonial period Yucatec Maya reducido term meaning "The One God". It is used in colonial, and more particularly in doctrinal texts, to refer to the Christian God. Since the word is found frequently in the Chilam Balam of Chumayel, a syncretistic document heavily influenced by Christianity, it refers specifically to the Christian God as a translation into Maya of the Christian concept of one God, used to enculturate the previously polytheist Maya to the new religion.

References to Hunab Ku have figured prominently in New Age Mayanism such as that of José Argüelles.

== Hunab Ku as the Christian God ==
The earliest known publicly available written reference to the term "Hunab Ku" (which translates as "Sole God" or "Only God",, when translated into German, it can additionally also mean "the only God / the lonely God" since there is only one and not a entire group of them as was the case in Aztec religion.) appears in the 16th century Diccionario de Motul, where "Hunab-ku" is identified as "the only living and true god, also the greatest of the gods of the people of Yucatan. He had no form because they said that he could not be represented as he was incorporeal". The term also appears in the Book of Chilam Balam of Chumayel, written after the Spanish Conquest, but is unknown in any pre-Conquest inscriptions in Maya writing. Hunab Ku was closely associated with an indigenous creator god, Itzamna, in an effort to make use of religious syncretism. An assertion that Hunab Ku was the high god of the Mayas can be found in Sylvanus Morley's classic book The Ancient Maya (1946). It is necessary to refer to Mayan authors to verify the Mayan origin and use of this.

However, the interpretation of Hunab Ku as a pre-Hispanic deity is not widely accepted by Mayanist scholars today. Anthropological linguist William Hanks, for example, identifies hunab ku as an expression created in the context of maya reducido, a form of Yucatec created in the context of missionization. He writes "The use of hunab ku ['one' + suffix + 'god'] for the singularity of God is linguistically transparent to the oneness of the Father, Son, and Holy Spirit and occurs widely in the missionary writings. He also notes, "the fact that close paraphrases make reference to Dios, halal ku, and hunab ku allows us to securely identify hunab ku with the Christian God, even when surrounding text may be ambiguous."

== Hunab Ku in New Age Belief ==
New Age beliefs about Hunab Ku derive from the work of Me r Domingo Martínez Parédez (1904–1984) who first presented his interpretation of the concept in 1953 and expanded upon his ideas in a subsequent book, Hunab Kú: Síntesis del pensamiento filosófico maya (1964). Martínez interpreted Hunab Ku as evidence for Maya monotheism and suggested that it was represented by the symbols of a square within a circle or a circle within a square, the square representing measurement and the circle representing motion. Martínez related Hunab Ku to concepts and symbols in Freemasonry, particularly the idea of a Great Architect of the Universe and the Masonic square and compass. It was also Martínez who first associated Hunab Ku with the expression "In Lak'ech," which he translated as "Eres mi otro yo." (In English, this means "You are my other I.") Martínez' ideas were popularized by Hunbatz Men and José Argüelles. The significance of the symbol has also been discussed by José Castillo Torre

== Hunab Ku as symbol ==
Argüelles' modification of the Hunab Ku symbol.

After being introduced to the concept by Hunbatz Men, who discussed this concept in his 1986 book Religión ciencia maya, Argüelles popularized Hunab Ku in his 1987 book The Mayan Factor. However, instead of Martínez' symbol, what Argüelles asserted was the "Hunab Ku" symbol was originally a rectangular design used by the Aztecs for a ritual cloak, known as the Mantle of Lip Plugs (or, arguably, mantle of "spider water"). The design survives today as a rug design being sold in central Mexico, but was associated with the Milky Way and the god Hunab Ku by Argüelles, who modified the symbol to look more like a circular motif evoking a yin and yang symbol as well as a spiral galaxy or the blood dropped by Hunab Ku on the bones that Quetzalcoatl took from Ah Puch to create humanity. It has become associated with Mayanism.

The earliest known appearance of the design is in the 16th century Codex Magliabechiano, an Aztec (not Maya) document that is also known for graphic depictions of heart sacrifice drawn by indigenous artists. The design was first reproduced by Zelia Nuttall, who rediscovered the Codex Magliabecchiano in Florence, Italy in 1898, in her 1901 book The Fundamental Principles of Old and New World Civilizations: A Comparative Research Based on a Study of the Ancient Mexican Religious, Sociological and Calendrical Systems. Facsimiles of the codex were published in 1903 and 1982. In 1976, the design was introduced to the weavers of Teotitlan, Oaxaca by epigrapher Gordon Whittaker, who commissioned a rug based on the design in the Codex Magliabbechiano. By 1978, it had been reproduced multiple times. Argüelles says he purchased two rugs from Teotitlan with the design, which he subsequently modified and popularized in his book The Mayan Factor (1987) and during the 1987 Harmonic Convergence.

The design, rendered in black-and-white, appeared on the cover and on decorated pages of The House of the Dawn (1914), a romance novel by Marah Ellis Ryan set in Hopi territory during the Pueblo Revolt of 1680. Decorative borders on pages in the book combine this design with the swastika, a motif that also appears frequently in other books by Ryan. It is likely that the illustrator for Ryan's book found the Aztec design in Nuttall's 1903 publication. John Major Jenkins, who first saw the symbol as used by Argüelles, subsequently encountered Ryan's novel in a used book store. He appropriated the decorated borders for use in his zine Jaloj Kexoj and PHI-64: The Dual Principle Core Paradigm of Mayan Time Philosophy and its Conceptual Parallel in Old World Thought (1994) and also a version republished with modifications as the zine Aztec Sacred Science (1994).

Despite the assertions of Martínez, Argüelles, and Jenkins, there are no known representations of "Hunab Ku" that have been documented for the ancient Maya. It is an Aztec motif (see the commentary on the Talk page for this article).

== See also ==
- Mayanism
