= Arthur (magazine) =

American music magazine

- Categories: Music magazine
- Frequency: Bimonthly
- Founder: Laris Kreslins and Jay Babcock
- First issue: October 2002
- Final issue: March 2014
- Company: Floating World Comics
- Country: United States
- Based in: Joshua Tree, California
- Language: English
- Website: arthurmag.com

Arthur magazine was a bi-monthly periodical that was founded in October 2002 by publisher Laris Kreslins and editor Jay Babcock. It received favorable attention from other periodicals such as L.A. Weekly, Print, Punk Planet and Rolling Stone. Arthur featured photography and artwork from Spike Jonze, Art Spiegelman, Susannah Breslin, Gary Panter and Godspeed You! Black Emperor. Arthur's regular columnists included Byron Coley, Thurston Moore, Daniel Pinchbeck, Paul Cullum, Douglas Rushkoff, and T-Model Ford. Some of the magazine's influences included Joan Didion, Thomas Paine, William Blake, Lester Bangs, Hunter S. Thompson, Tom Wolfe, and Greil Marcus, as well and the exhibit and book A Secret Location on the Lower East Side: Adventures in Writing, 1960-1980.

Arthur magazine was particularly drawn to noise music, stoner metal, folk and other types of psychedelia. The first issue of Arthur featured an interview with journalist and author Daniel Pinchbeck (author of Breaking Open the Head); artwork by Alan Moore (Watchmen, From Hell, League of Extraordinary Gentlemen); and an interview with Arthur C. Clarke.

Previous to creating the publication, Laris Kreslins created the popular music journals Sound Collector and Audio Review. Jay Babcock was a contributor to Mojo magazine and the L.A. Weekly. Cultural commentator Conrad Flynn referred to Arthur as the Oz magazine of the last twenty years in an interview with Billy Corgan.

Arthur magazine also released CDs and DVDs under the imprint of their label. On Labor Day weekend in 2005, they curated Arthurfest in Barnsdall Park; in February 2006, Arthur Ball in Echo Park; and in October 2006 Arthur Nights at The Palace Theater, in downtown Los Angeles.

On February 25, 2007, it was announced on the magazine's web site that it would be ceasing publication indefinitely. The hiatus was due to a breakdown in negotiations between Lime Publishing (Arthur's original publisher) and another unnamed publisher. In April 2007, it was announced that the magazine would return as Arthur Vol. II in the near future. The magazine resumed publication in September 2007.

In June 2008, owner Jay Babcock moved Arthur's headquarters from Los Angeles to New York, the seat of North America's publishing industry.

On March 6, 2011, Jay Babcock announced that the magazine would cease to exist in any form as of March 15, 2011, though its archive and store would remain active for an unspecified period thereafter.

In November 2012, the Arthur website announced the return of the magazine as of December 22, 2012. However, this resurgence proved to be brief, and in March 2014 the magazine once again announced that its online and print versions would go dormant.

As of April 20, 2017, Jay Babcock announced the start of Landline bulletin, a continuation of Arthur Magazine email bulletin. As Babcock describes it, "What is this stuff? Ideas and nudges, hopefully forming a small bailiwick outside the unceasing current of cruddiness — irregular epistles intended for friends, colleagues, Arthur heads, pastoral people, plant people, rural country people, dharma people, herbalists, gardeners, wild people and other curious sweetfolk."

== Arthurfest ==
ArthurFest was a two-day music festival curated by Arthur magazine. The festival took place September 4 and 5, 2005 at the Barnsdall Art Park in Los Angeles, California. The lineup included such acts as: Yoko Ono, Sonic Youth, The Black Keys, Modey Lemon, The Time Flys, Winter Flowers, Dead Meadow, Future Pigeon, Dos, Fatso Jetson, the Night Porter, Lavender Diamond, Radar Brothers, Nora Keyes, Geronimo, Six Organs of Admittance, Brightblack Morning Light, Circle, Comets On Fire, Earth, Cat Power, Young Jazz Giants, and Devendra Banhart.

== Issue List ==
Issue	Season	Contributors
1	October 2002	Cover and centerpiece: an in-depth feature on electro-provocateur Peaches ("thus sprach peatzches") — a lively interview about her Berlin life, musical process and role in the electro/rock underground, illustrated with photos. Fiction and art: a "frightful fairytale" by Dame Darcy and various comics sprinkled through the issue. Music and scene reports: profiles and photo essays including Lift to Experience, Eddie Dean on Bacon Hollow and the legendary fudge bomb, and a live/B.O.C. concert transcript sent to the editor. Memoir excerpt: BMX legend Mat Hoffman's chapter from his new autobiography (The Ride of My Life). Essays and interviews: Joe Carducci on contemporary culture ("life against dementia"), Paul Cullum's appreciation for filmmaker Eagle Pennell, and a substantial interview with Daniel Pinchbeck by Joseph Durwin. Feature interview: "Famous Arthur" — a profile of science-fiction titan Arthur C. Clarke by Paul Moody, with illustrations and a personal portrait of Clarke in Sri Lanka. Regular columns and humor: Byron Coley & Thurston Moore's Bull Tongue column, Ask Neil Hamburger (advice/comedy), and other recurring pieces. Visuals and production: strong photographic and illustrative work (Spike Jonze, Pat Graham, Camille Rose Garcia, Alan Moore's illustration for the Pinchbeck piece), plus staff credits and publication details.
2	January 2003	A new advice column by bluesman T‑Model Ford, dispensing blunt, world‑worn life guidance. "...And Then I Joined the Circus," a first‑person report by Sue Carpenter on contemporary women in circus arts, with photographs by Lauren Klain. A profile/essay on pulp author Jeff Lint by Steve Aylett, revisiting pulpy fiction, cult legend and outrageous episodes from Lint's life. A lengthy conversation over tea with Genesis P‑Orridge (with Douglas Rushkoff), exploring cut‑ups, post‑authorship ideas and creative theory, accompanied by Shawn Mortensen photos. A feature on Devendra Banhart by Gabe Soria, with photos by Shawn Mortensen, introducing his singular musical style. A substantial portfolio of never‑published photographs by Charles Brittin documenting the 1960s scene—Lenny Bruce, the Velvet Underground's Exploding Plastic Inevitable, James Baldwin and other cultural moments—curated by Kristine McKenna. An exclusive excerpt from Caetano Veloso's autobiography about Brazil in 1968: politics, protest, and psychedelic culture. Columns and short pieces: Bull Tongue (Byron Coley & Thurston Moore) on underground recordings and texts; Peter Relic remembering Jam Master Jay; comics from Kevin Huizenga, Jordan Crane, Anders Nilsen and others; and a sampler CD and music ads. Editorial and masthead material, contributor credits, distribution and ordering information.
3	March 2003	A long, enthusiastic feature on The Polyphonic Spree by Gabe Soria, with a portrait by Paul Pope and an extended interview with leader Tim DeLaughter about the band's plans, optimism and lingering sadness. A substantial tribute package to Joe Strummer (1952–2002): photographs by Ann Summa, Slash-era Clash coverage, reflections and a 2001 interview by Kristine McKenna, and essays on his legacy. An exclusive chapter-length excerpt from Ashley Kahn's A Love Supreme: The Story of John Coltrane's Signature Album, examining Coltrane's artistic and spiritual leap. A profile of San Francisco artist Shirley Tse by Mimi Zeiger, focusing on her large-scale sculptures made from Styrofoam and plastic and the cultural questions they raise. An advice column by John Lurie serving in for T-Model Ford, answering a series of frank, often comic letters about relationships and family life. Regular columns and departments: comics from Jordan Crane, Sammy Harkham, Marc Bell and Ron Rege Jr.; Byron Coley & Thurston Moore's Bull Tongue reviews; photo essay "What War Looks Like" by Kenneth Jarecke; and various cultural miscellany.
4	May 2003	Ask T‑Model Ford: A wide‑ranging, folk‑wise Q&A with 79‑year‑old bluesman T‑Model Ford, covering everything from temper control and marriage to where Bin Laden might be hiding and why some women grow mustaches. May the Road Rise Up to Rock You (Peter Relic): A vivid tour chronicle following The Black Keys as they open for Sleater‑Kinney — intimate on‑the‑road scenes, live performance descriptions, and portraits of the bands and fans. Magic Is Afoot (Alan Moore): A long essay by celebrated comics author Alan Moore on the historical, theoretical and autobiographical links between the arts and the occult, accompanied by portraiture and photos. BloodMoney (John Coulthart): A graphic, topical reworking of U.S. currency imagery to reflect the political climate. Corporate Pedophilia (Alissa Quart): An excerpt from Branded: The Buying and Selling of Teenagers, examining how corporations target very young children. Features and columns: Byron Coley & Thurston Moore's underground music roundups, a Wake remembering Mississippi fife‑and‑drum figures, comics by a roster of indie cartoonists, and music recommendations from Arthur's editors.The issue is dedicated to Helen Thomas.
5	July 2003	Highlights and contributors: Longform interview and reportage: Chris Hedges (Pulitzer Prize–winning war correspondent) on the human costs of war and how it is sanitized and mythologized by state and media. • Features and essays from writers and artists including David Cross (photographed by Lauren Klain), Alan Moore, David Byrne, Patti Smith, Art Spiegelman, Michael Moorcock, and Daniel Pinchbeck. Political and cultural criticism, e.g., Jay Babcock's editorial "Don't Blame the Messenger," a manifesto for resistance and mutual aid; Kristine McKenna on a Vietnam-era protest art action; and poetry by Michael Brownstein and others. Comics, art and visual work from a wide range of creators (Godspeed You! Black Emperor, Bill Griffith, Peter Kuper, Sharon Rudahl, Megan Kelso, John Coulthart, and more), mixing satire, collage and documentary photography. Regular columns and reviews: Byron Coley and Thurston Moore on music, Paul Cullum on film, and Jordan Crane's ongoing comic serial.
6	September 2003	Cover and photo feature: Iggy Pop and the Stooges' much-talked-about Coachella comeback, with a photo spread by Peter G. Whitfield and interviews with Iggy and surviving Stooges. Cover feature story: "When Good Pranksters Go Christian" — a long piece on the L.A. Cacophony Society, its prankster history, internal crises, and the surprising conversion of its leader, Rev. Al. Columns and personalities: Holly Golightly answers reader questions; T‑Model Ford offers tough-love parenting advice; Ian Svenonius debuts an astrology column; Jordan Crane runs an ongoing fiction serial ("Keeping Two" part five). Politics and history: Notes from the Underground — an interview with documentary filmmaker Sam Green about his film on the Weather Underground; an exit interview with John Sinclair as he prepares to leave the U.S.; an excerpt from Erin Cosgrove's romanticized Baader‑Meinhof tale. Comics and visuals: New comics by Souther Salazar, Megan Kelso and others; regular art and photography features (Jack Gould, Peter Whitfield). Reviews and culture writing: Album, film and book reviews (including pieces by James Parker, Paul Cullum, Byron Coley and Thurston Moore), plus short columns, misprints corrected and subscription/donation info.
7	November 2003	A rare, wide-ranging interview with Kevin Shields of My Bloody Valentine (Perfect Sound Forever), in which Shields reflects on the band's breakthrough sound, influences, remastering rarities and his post‑MBV work. Peaches guesting as the Advice Desk, answering readers' frank questions about sex, identity and life on tour. On‑the‑road coverage of a summer psych caravan featuring Sunburned Hand of the Man, Comets on Fire and Six Organs of Admittance, with live reporting and photos. • An essay excerpt on the Dreamachine and 1960s consciousness exploration (from John Geiger's Chapel of Extreme Experience). Regulars and features: T‑Model Ford interview, astrology by Ian Svenonius, serialized comics and art (Jordan Crane, Sammy Harkham, John Coulthart), photography essays, and short humour pieces (including excerpts from The Thackery T. Lambshead Pocket Guide). Reviews and appreciations (Charles Bronson, Sun Ra, assorted record/DVD reviews), plus production credits and distribution/subscription details.
8	January 2004	A feature journey into Dollywood — essays and a deep, affectionate review of Dolly Parton's music and theme-park oddities. Fire's Club: Margaret Wappler on the Fiery Furnaces (Matt and Eleanor Friedberger), a spirited profile of the sibling duo and their genre-hopping debut. • Brother from This Planet: Jay Babcock's wide-ranging interview with Brother JT — his back story, spiritual influences, and adventurous home-recorded music. • I'm Just Sayin': regular spot with an interview of T-Model Ford — blunt, homespun advice on crack, cars and raising kids. Encounter with Maximón: James Marriott's investigation into Guatemala's folk-magic patron saint, illustrated by John Coulthart. Reviews and columns: Byron Coley & Thurston Moore on De Stijl/Freedom From festival, Steve Aylett on The Matrix, Paul Cullum on new DVDs (Spike Jonze, Michel Gondry, Chris Cunningham), plus Camera Obscura, Smoke Wagon art by Gary Panter and poem "R.I.P. SUV" by Charles Potts. Extras and miscellany: Holly Golightly's recipe ("Mashed Roots"), Ian Svenonius's astrology column, letters of comment, illustrations, and the usual offbeat doodles and marginalia
9	March 2004	"I'm Just Sayin'" — T-Model Ford's no-nonsense advice column and short interviews; tough, funny blues wisdom. • Daniel Pinchbeck (Here and Now) — a long, reflective essay about the crisis of imagination, shamanic experience, prophecy and an accelerated evolution of consciousness (2012 themes). • Liars (History Repeats Itself) — an interview with Angus Andrews on the band's shift in sound, concept album about witch persecutions, and their move away from trendy revivalism. Wino profile (Heavy Riffing) — history and perspective on Scott Weinrich's work and politics; photography by Brian Liu. MC5 coverage — interviews and essays about Detroit's revolutionary rockers and a new documentary; archival photos and posters. Local oddities and features — a piece on the Arcata-to-Ferndale Kinetic Sculpture Race, a profile of a Silver Lake pirate radio operator (KBLT) (Susan Carpenter), and more offbeat regional reporting. Food: "Come On In My Kitchen" — Dave Catching's New Orleans soul red beans, rice and cornbread recipe and Mardi Gras story. Practical activism: a public-service piece with the American Friends Service Committee on how to help teens avoid military recruitment. New contributors and comics — welcomes to Daniel Pinchbeck, Ben Katchor and Tom Devlin; comics, illustrations and recurring columns (art by Seldon Hunt, Leif Goldberg, Ivan Brunetti, John Hankiewicz, Tom Hart, Ben Katchor). Reviews, music column (C & D), and an astrology column by Ian Svenonius.
10	May 2004	Long interview: Director Guy Maddin — a melancholy, singular filmmaker profiled by Kristine McKenna. A playful, Fog of War–style oral piece: Godzilla reflects on 50 years of cinematic terror (Dave Tompkins; Brian Ralph illustrations). The new folk underground: in-depth portraits and photo shoots of Devendra Banhart, Joanna Newsom, CocoRosie and Faun Fables (Trinie Dalton, Jay Babcock; photography by Melanie Pullen). Cultural and political essays: Daniel Pinchbeck reconsiders Jesus; Merrick exposes the human and ecological costs of coltan mining and how mobile tech ties into Africa's devastation. • Lifestyle and culture: Will Oldham's chess-pie recipe; T-Model Ford's streetwise advice column. Criticism and columns: Paul Cullum on cinema, James Parker, reviews, and comics by Marc Bell, Ben Katchor, John Porcellino and others. • Editorial voice: Jay Babcock's editor's statement argues for art as a necessary, energizing response to political malaise and cultural "six-year-old" thinking.
11	July 2004	Cover feature: A wide-ranging profile and photo feature on Sonic Youth's Kim Gordon (Oliver Hall; portrait by Emily Wilson). Long reads: Daniel Pinchbeck's "Here and Now" essay asking whether we're living in the Kali Yuga; Mark Pilkington's report from a Thelema/Crowley centenary convention in London; Kristine McKenna's appreciation and vintage interview of late desert sculptor Noah Purifoy, with new photos by W. T. Nelson. Music & culture: Daniel Chamberlin's candid piece about being a closet Grateful Dead fan ("Uncle Skullfucker's Band"); T‑Model Ford's recurring advice column and life observations; new artwork by John Lurie (Lounge Lizards founder). Visuals & comics: Regular comic strips and illustrated contributions from Ben Katchor, Paul Cullum, Kevin Huizinga, Marc Bell and others; a John Coulthart illustration accompanying the Crowley/Thelema coverage. Reviews and miscellany: Record reviews, reportage, poetry‑comics, a recipe from The Reigning Sound's Greg Cartwright, letters (including a note from Robert Wyatt), and music‑scene ads and listings.
12	September 2004	Cover feature: an in-depth interview with comics writer Grant Morrison about magic, consciousness and a 25‑year career in comics. Music writing: an excerpt on why Johnny Cash recorded at Folsom Prison (with Jim Marshall photography); a profile of Josephine Foster and her band The Supposed; Trinie Dalton on the legacy of Royal Trux; and assorted reviews and record notes. Culture & curiosities: Daniel Pinchbeck's thoughtful defense of taking crop circles seriously; essays and columns on everything from Bush-era politics to film and avant‑garde art. Departments and regulars: "I'm Just Sayin'" (editorial dispatches), a horoscope by Steve Aylett, interviews with bluesman T‑Model Ford, recipes and musings from Wayne Coyne, letters, and comics by contributors such as Ben Katchor, Gabrielle Bell and Tom Hart. Comics, reviews and art: original strips and columns, plenty of illustration (cover art by Cameron Stewart; zodiac art by Arik Roper), and an active reviews section covering music, film and books.
13	November 2004	The issue foregrounds a few big features: interviews and profiles with Le Tigre (feminist electro-dance politics), Little Wings (a Malibu portrait), and a Black Keys recipe column by Dan Auerbach (matzoh ball soup). A major centerpiece is an oral-history investigation—"Out, Demons, Out!"—recounting the 1967 Pentagon exorcism and the birth of Yippie, assembled by Larry "Ratso" Sloman, Michael Simmons and Jay Babcock, with archival images. Comics and illustration play a big role (Howard Cruse, John Coulthart cover art, Ben Katchor, Vanessa Davis and others). Humor pieces include a David Cross + Eugene Mirman item imagining "If Little Bush Wins…," and a portrait session of Mirman. Regular columns appear too: Daniel Pinchbeck on Burning Man and consciousness, Paul Cullum's "Camera Obscura," Byron Coley & Thurston Moore reviewing underground records, and ongoing features with T-Model Ford. The issue rounds out with record reviews, contributor notes, editorial reflections (Jay Babcock on art as consolation in hard times), and full production/distribution credits. Overall it's an eclectic mix of music, politics, psychedelia and comics framed as a cultural antidote to the era's anxieties.
14	January 2005	"Re‑Psychedelica Britannica": Mark Pilkington reports from Britain on how a legal technicality has made psilocybin mushrooms openly available there — illustrated with psychedelic art. "The Fifth World and the Hopi Apocalypse": Daniel Pinchbeck travels to Hopiland to explore Hopi prophecy, environmental threats and the struggle to preserve a way of life. "God Bless Jello Biafra": Sorina Diaconescu interviews the veteran punk agitator about politics, surveillance, pranks and artistic integrity, in the wake of the 2004 U.S. election. "I'm Just Sayin'": The editor's dispatch on politics and resistance; a column by blues elder T‑Model Ford; MF Doom's family mac & cheese recipe; and other short pieces that mix humor, practical tips and polemic. A photo essay on American bingo halls by Ryan Beshara. A profile of the Danish artist/activist collective Superflex and their corporate interventions. A light, personal report from "Canada Rules, OK?" — a profile of a New Yorker's move to Quebec. • Regular departments: reviews (music, books and film), comics and artwork (Ben Katchor, Sam Zettwoch, David Lasky and more), and a letters section that reflects reader engagement.
15	March 2005	A long conversation with Ben Chasny (Six Organs of Admittance) about making his acid‑folk masterpiece, with photos by Allison Watkins. Brendan Benson's charming how‑to on making the perfect cup of tea. Ian Svenonius's strange, firsthand account of being interviewed by the Secret Service—part comedy, part indictment of surveillance culture. J. G. Ballard on why America frightens him and the deeper cultural fears behind unilateralist politics. Douglas Rushkoff's inaugural Arthur column arguing for reinvented, collective forms of social engagement. A profile/interview about Henry Darger and Jessica Yu's documentary exploration of his hidden life and work. "Post‑Election Funnies": a substantial comics feature responding to the political moment, edited by Tom Devlin, with contributions from a wide range of cartoonists. Regular curiosities: T‑Model Ford riffs, horoscopes by Becky Stark, art by Ben Katchor and John Lurie, and reviews (including a metal roundup and year‑end highlights).
16	May 2005	Cover story and photo feature: M.I.A.—a long interview tracing her transnational origins (Sri Lanka, London), pop instincts and radical persona. • Long political essay: "Freedom Now Maybe — The New Secession" by Peter Lamborn Wilson, which explores U.S. secessionist movements (Second Vermont Republic, Cascadia, New Hampshire Project, Texas, Hawaii, urban secession in NYC), historical legal angles, and the appeal of small-region autonomy as a response to imperial decline. Music and scene pieces: a black-metal photo/feature on Scandinavian bands; profiles of Mary Timony/Ex Hex; a piece on Magma and The Mars Volta and other prog acts; and a writeup on experimental releases and reissues. Interviews and personality pieces: Mike Patton cooks and talks about odd culinary/record projects; an ongoing column with Mississippi bluesman T-Model Ford; and a long Ben Chasny (Six Organs of Admittance) correction/reprint. Columns and culture: Douglas Rushkoff on "reality as subversion," Daniel Pinchbeck on transhumanism and the technological singularity, and a piece on Druid Heights and bohemian enclaves in Northern California.
17	July 2005	Feature reporting and essays: Daniel Pinchbeck on "No More Oil, No More Lies" (our post‑oil future) and Douglas Rushkoff arguing "Be Your Own Guru." Longform and dispatches: Paul Smart's vivid dispatch from a Maui squatter village; Kristine McKenna's interview with Brian Eno timed to his vocal album; an Alan Moore salute to Eno. Music and artists: coverage and contributions from Chris Goss (including a memorable garlic‑free Italian pork sauce recipe), Jason Miles, Marc Bell, Jackie Beat, Byron Coley and Thurston Moore; reviews and columns on underground records; comic excerpts and art pieces. • Photo and art features: B.C. photographs by Jamel Shabazz ("A Time Before Crack"), illustrations by John Coulthart, Arik Moonhawk Roper, Jeff Garcia and others; work from Evah Fan, Brendan Monroe, Able Brown and more. • Practical & provocative features: a tongue‑in‑cheek step‑by‑step on siphoning gasoline (humorous/instructional), letters, correction pages, and Jackie Beat's horoscope column. • Comics & curiosities: two pages from Jeff Lint's "The Caterer," assorted comics and an eclectic margins/art section.
18	September 2005	Feature packages: a Round Table on the Grateful Dead with members of Animal Collective, Comets On Fire and others; a travel/rite-of-passage piece about ayahuasca, witchdoctors and Iquitos, Peru by David Reeves; and a substantial profile of Jon Hassell (composer/trumpeter) with a beginner's guide and an essay by Hassell. Long interviews and think pieces: Alan Bishop of Sun City Girls discusses travel, terrorism and world-music collage curation; Daniel Pinchbeck argues against serial monogamy in a provocative column; Douglas Rushkoff runs a column on the ethics of persuasion and new persuasive technologies. Scenes and profiles: coverage of Osaka duo Afrirampo in Los Angeles and a kitchen-style recipe/feature from Swedish psych-pop artist Dungen (Gustav Ejstes), plus a Richard Hawley kitchen/profile and a personal T-Model Ford column/interview. Art, comics and illustration: regular illustrated columns, contributions from artists such as Arik Moonhawk Roper and Vanessa Davis, and a comics section including work by Able Brown, Dennis Culver and others. • Reviews and columns: Byron Coley & Thurston Moore's "Bull Tongue" column, extensive record and media reviews, and a "Diary of a Bread Delivery Man" comic by David Lasky. Departments: letters to the editor ("I'm Just Saying/Dear Arthur"), staff and contributor notes, advertising/distribution info, and listings of artwork and contributors.
19	November 2005	Feature essays and reportage: Douglas Rushkoff examines suicide bombings as a "media virus"; Daniel Chamberlin reports from Egypt, Lebanon and Syria in "Dr. Moustache and the Egyptian Gentleman"; Trinie Dalton profiles psych-art-rockers Animal Collective; James Kochalka contributes a piece called "Reinventing Everything." Music and culture: A remembrance of R.L. Burnside; reviews and columns on underground music (Byron Coley & Thurston Moore's "BullTongue" column, and other reviews); tour listings and news for bands such as Broken Social Scene, Stars (on tour with Death Cab for Cutie), The Most Serene Republic and others. Columns, curiosities and lifestyle: David Reeves on ginseng and roots culture; an editor's column about Ray Manzarek's SUV licensing controversy and Arthur's "Prisoner Fund" drive to send free subscriptions to inmates; comics and short fiction (including Trinie Dalton's fiction and PShaw's "Strings" comics). Visuals and art: Photographs by Susanna Howe, artwork and comics by contributors such as Greg Cook, Kiersh and Ian Holman, and other illustrated pieces.
20	January 2006	"The Whole Enchilada": a long interview in which David Lynch discusses Transcendental Meditation with Kristine McKenna. "A Deeper Shade of Doom": Brian Evenson examines drone-metal bands such as Earth and Sunn o)))—how they sculpt expansive music from minimal materials. "Dr. Moustache and the Egyptian Gentleman": Daniel Chamberlin's travel reporting wraps up a Middle East journey with a focused piece on Syria and a return to Egypt. "Under a Blanket": John Adamian profiles Colleen and the fragile, melodic textures of her music. A first-person piece by New Orleans filmmaker Henry Griffin about returning to the Ninth Ward after Hurricane Katrina, blending reportage and memoir. Other elements: "I'm Just Saying" column showcases the Buddha Machine (a self-contained loop player) as a hot tip from Alan Bishop. • Reviews, columns and records coverage: contributions from Byron Coley & Thurston Moore, C&D audio/video roundups, and a strong slate of new-release blurbs and indie label promos. Visual content and comics: original artwork and comics by Tom Hart, Jason Miles, David Lasky, Dennis Culver, PShaw and others.
21	March 2006	Feature on Pearls & Brass: a profile and photo spread of the rural Pennsylvania blues-rock trio and their new album The Indian Tower. Delia Gonzalez & Gavin Russom: a profile/interview with the Berlin-based new‑age/punk duo (photography by Hadley Hudson). Tav Falco: Richard A. Pleuger revisits a tour with Falco and the Unapproachable Panther Burns through a vanishing American South. "Godless" by Douglas Rushkoff: a provocative column arguing that religious belief has become a public‑health–level problem and urging secular engagement with sacred stories. The Center for Tactical Magic inaugurates "Applied Magic(k)": practical exercises in magical thinking and public-space interventions. Political and cultural pieces including "The Big Win in Iraq," other essays and reviews (Bull Tongue columnists Byron Coley & Thurston Moore), poetry, comics and illustration. Editorial note launching the new ARTHUR INDIE PAGES—low‑cost classifieds aimed to strengthen and connect independently owned local businesses across the U.S. and Canada. • Contributor notes, housekeeping (credits and corrections), and the magazine's continued call for collective, non‑corporate cultural work.
22	May 2006	Highlights include a photo feature on drone/noise duo Growing; an interview with Al Cisneros of Om about the band's spare, meditative heavy-metal sound; and "Donut Power," a playful Center for Tactical Magic dispatch about working practical occult forces in public protest. Longer cultural pieces explore hallucinogens—Jeremy Narby on LSD and ayahuasca—and the life and influence of North Indian vocalist Pandit Pran Nath. Douglas Rushkoff's "Their War" column questions whether saturating ourselves with news helps or harms action, while other dispatches cover Mardi Gras in New Orleans, ArthurBall scenes, and reader letters. The issue mixes reportage, essays, photography and illustrated comics, with a consistently skeptical, irreverent and visionary voice and a strong focus on music, ritual, and tactical creativity.
23	July 2006	Brightblack Morning Light (Joshua Tree), with a long profile and photos by Eden Batki. Tone: indie/DIY, antiwar and environmental politics, experimental music, film and cultural criticism, and practical countercultural how‑tos. Country Life: A meditative, road‑and-wilderness profile of Brightblack Morning Light (Daniel Chamberlin; Joshua Tree shoot). Everything Must Go: Derrick Jensen on re-wilding the planet — an interview about ecological collapse and direct action. The Dissident Cinema of Peter Watkins: John Patterson on Watkins's politically radical, formally challenging films. Applied Magic(k): The Center for Tactical Magic explains the power of symbols, sigils and logos, and includes a step‑by‑step "Power Transposition" tactic for subverting institutional authority through signage and graffiti. Douglas Rushkoff: "Why I'm not moving to Canada" — a reflective essay about staying and working to change the U.S. rather than emigrating. Heavy Air / Godsmack: A contentious interview with Sully Erna about the band's pro‑war statements and ties to military recruiting. Playing Dead: Ed Halter on activism within online video games and the overlap between game makers and the military. New music and reviews: Columns by Byron Coley & Thurston Moore, extensive C&D reviews covering Comets on Fire, Vetiver, Tony Allen, Beavis & Butthead Vol. 2, and many more; a feature on the duo Belong from New Orleans. The New Herbalist: A practical, charming piece on mint (tea, history, remedies) by Molly Frances. Comics, letters, street graffiti photo feature, and regular contributor notes.
24	October 2006	A hard-hitting essay by Douglas Rushkoff about the rise of an American-style fascism and what admitting that reality means for civic action. • "Applied Magic(k)" from the Center for Tactical Magic: a playful, uncanny take on telecom technology and "cell phone spells," exploring how modern devices blur technology and magic. A major music feature on Ethan Miller—his work with Comets on Fire and Howlin' Rain—by Trinie Dalton, with photography by Eden Batki, tracing Miller's California-rooted, psychedelic sound. • Photo and cultural pieces: Seymour Rosen's 1967 Griffith Park Love-In images ("Fragile Flowers in Bloom") and Kristine McKenna's contextual text; Chris Ziegler's profile "Trust & Love" on the Sharp Ease; a historical oral piece about all-ages shows with MC5 manager John Sinclair. Practical DIY fashion: "Sew It Yourself," using Built by Wendy patterns for fall. Departments and recurring columns: reader letters and debates (including a discussion about American Apparel ads and representation), "The New Herbalist" (Molly Frances on walnuts), music reviews and columns by Byron Coley, Thurston Moore and others, comics, and dispatches like Dave Reeves' foreign-policy column "Do the Math."
25	Winter 2007	Cover features and long reads: an in‑depth profile/history piece about Joanna Newsom's album Ys (photography by Eden Batki), and a thoughtful essay on Robert Anton Wilson and the meaning of reputation and community by Douglas Rushkoff. Culture & ritual: "The New Herbalist" by Molly Frances explores pagan roots and herbal lore of the winter holidays (Pagan Christmas), urging readers to reclaim seasonal rituals and gifts from nature. The supernatural as social critique: The Center for Tactical Magic contributes a provocative piece on ghosts — not just paranormal curiosities but embodiments of unresolved injustice — plus practical "magic(k)" exercises for activism. Scene & music: A two‑part oral/history thread continues with "Let the Kids In Too," a history of all‑ages shows (Part II) featuring an interview with ex‑Black Flag bassist Chuck Dukowski. Numerous album and underground-music reviews appear in the reviews section (Bull Tongue columnists, Byron Coley, Thurston Moore, Chris Ziegler and others). Politics & gadgets: "Do the Math" debates the M‑16 vs AK‑47 and the failures of American institutions; Dave Reeves contributes a piece on improvised weapons (and letters testify to readers' experiments). • Personal & photo essays: Justine Kurland's family/fashion photography, family-album features, and other visual spreads (including a holiday staff photo). • Letters & departments: reader letters, graffiti submissions, contributors' notes, comics, and regular columns like "I'm Just Sayin'" and "The New Herbalist."
26	September 2007	Cover and features: a large photo spread from the Arthur Revival in Los Angeles and in-depth pieces including an interview with Becky Stark (Lavender Diamond) that asks "Is peace enough?", a profile of 80-year-old Zen humorist and media innovator Henry Jacobs, and a Bull Tongue encounter with Yoko Ono (including photography by Eden Batki). Politics and opinion: Douglas Rushkoff's sharp column arguing that 9/11 conspiracy speculation distracts activists from real abuses of power; a frank obituary/tribute to the experimental band Sun City Girls; and the magazine's usual mix of irreverent cultural commentary. Applied Magic(k): The Center for Tactical Magic writes about "mobilizing vehicles for change," recounting the Tactical Ice Cream Unit tour (and an encounter with Canadian police), and offering practical civil-rights advice for encounters with law enforcement. Music, columns and reviews: long and short takes on underground and indie music, including columns by Byron Coley and Thurston Moore, record reviews (Devendra Banhart, Deerhoof, Magik Markers, etc.), and pieces on all-ages shows and punk history. Arts, culture and lifestyle: photography, comics and illustration (full-page color comics by PShaw), a fashion/knitting feature ("String Theory"), and lighter pieces such as Molly Frances' playful interview material and a watermelon essay. Housekeeping and corrections: the editors publish an extended "Mistakes Were Made" apology for production errors in the previous issue, plus a long list of contributors, advisors and supporters who helped bring the magazine back to its bimonthly schedule.
27	December 2007	Feature interviews and profiles: Erik Davis on guitarist Sir Richard Bishop ("It's Coming Down, Baby!"); Ben Chasny (Six Organs of Admittance) and Al Cisneros (Om) on music, vibration and camaraderie; I.F. "Ian" Svenonius reporting on Baltimore band Celebration; and a long, vivid remembrance of James Brown by "The Mighty Burner." Music and event coverage: Concrete Frequency, a Los Angeles Philharmonic series exploring the city through music (performances include Cornelius, Plaid and a multi‑artist "Songs of the City" bill); reviews and columns on underground and experimental releases; label and new‑release roundups. Columns and essays: Douglas Rushkoff on contemporary parenthood and the Internet; "Applied Magic(k)" from The Center for Tactical Magic on activism and strategy; Plastic Crimewave on psychedelic histories; Byron Coley & Thurston Moore's underground column; "I'm Just Sayin'," letters and reader feedback. • Visual and documentary work: Abby Banks' excerpt from her Punk House project; photography features (Stacy Kranitz, Eden Batki, Annabel Mehrain); illustrations and comics throughout. Practical life pieces: "Kick Out the Chemicals" — a consumer‑health primer on safer household and beauty products; Nurse Periwinkle's reader advice; resources and product suggestions.
28	March 2008	The cover feature is a major profile of Diamanda Galás — "The Woman Who Knows Too Much" — an intense portrait of the avant‑garde singer and performer, illustrated with Susanna Howe's photography. Major features in this issue: "Reign of Blood": Erik Morse traces the blood‑soaked legacy of the French pulp villain Fantômas and how the figure influenced early cinema and major 20th‑century art movements. "Guerrilla Warfare": Paul Moody digs into the London guerrilla‑gig scene spawned by the Libertines, with a photo essay of No Age's daylight set by the L.A. River shot by Joshua Pressman. • A Stephen Malkmus piece touching on music, leisure and the oddities of golf. Regular columns and departments include: "I'm Just Sayin'": reader mail, corrections and industry notes. "Applied Magic(k)": a playful, in‑depth look at wands and their symbolic/functional roles in magic and culture (by The Center for Tactical Magic). "Zodiac" by Molly Frances: a light, imaginative numerology/horoscope spread for 2008. • "The Analog Life" debut by Erik Davis, and columns from Byron Coley & Thurston Moore ("Bull Tongue"), Plastic Crimewave, and others.
29	May 2008	At its center are long features and columns that move between the playful and the philosophical: an in‑depth visit with veteran pop duo Sparks as they prepare to perform their entire 20‑album catalogue; Peter Lamborn Wilson's provocative essays on "Green Hermeticism" and his tongue-in-cheek Endarkenment Manifesto; a wide‑ranging conversation with writer/screenwriter Rudy Wurlitzer; and a fashion photo essay on a Los Angeles spring afternoon. Recurring columns explore contemporary media and technology (Douglas Rushkoff on the credit collapse; Erik Davis on the death of analog TV), experimental practice (The Center for Tactical Magic on communicating with plants), and subcultural lifeways (skateboarding as a mind‑body practice, dandelion wine and foraging, plus comics and underground art). The issue also includes a Sparks listener's guide, letters from readers (including a vivid New Orleans dispatch), obituaries, reviews of music and books, and a broad contributor list that mixes journalists, artists, musicians and theorists.
30	July 2008	A cover feature and long profile of Jason "Spaceman" Pierce of Spiritualized about creating a new narcotic-gospel album (photography by Stacy Kranitz). An exclusive excerpt from Alejandro Jodorowsky's new book, reflecting on late-1960s Mexico City encounters with Leonora Carrington and a Zen teacher. New poetry, an in-memoriam piece on Bo Diddley, and a photo/fashion spread on psychonaut rockers The Entrance Band (styled by Alia Penner). A practical and provocative piece from The Center for Tactical Magic explaining a sticker-based "diagrammatic hex" aimed at institutions and corporations. Departments and recurring material . Columns on skateboarding, media critique and analog culture; reader letters; comics; and a nature/foraging essay on mugwort. Extensive music and book reviews, including features on Howlin Rain, Chango Spasiuk, Roky Erickson/13th Floor Elevators and underground comix history. Contributors include Jay Babcock (editor/publisher), Eddie Dean, Erik Davis, Joseph Remnant, Stacy Kranitz and many others.
31	October 2008	Feature stories: Trinie Dalton's immersive two-day stay with Brightblack Morning Light in New Mexico (keeping it local); Plastic Crimewave on Sly & the Family Stone opening for the Jimi Hendrix Experience in 1968 (everybody was a star); and a stylized short piece by Annakim Violette (violette gardens) with photography and design by Alia Penner. A thick comics centerfold with new work from well-known indie cartoonists (Jeffrey Brown, Charles Burns, Al Columbia, Matt Furie, Julia Wertz, and many others). Long essay and manifesto-style pieces such as "Applied Magic(k)" from The Center for Tactical Magic, which argues for practical, street-level uses of magic(k) toward social change. Practical culture: "Weedeater" by Nance Klehm — a forage-and-preserve guide with recipes and tips (nuts, seeds, infusions, cider, drying herbs), encouraging urban foraging and low-tech food practices. • Regular columns: "I'm Just Sayin'" (letters and editor correspondence), music and culture reviews (Recently Discovered Delights by Molly Frances, Bull Tongue by Byron Coley & Thurston Moore, C and D album roundups), "Do The Math" reviews, and pieces on skate culture and the mortgage crisis. • Design and photography: Issue art direction and visual work by Alia Penner, Lisa Law (cover photography), Cassandra Chae (design/illustration), and other contributors.
32	December 2008	"Honest Work" — Dave Reeves' unvarnished special report from harvest season on a Humboldt County cannabis farm, with art by Arik Roper and photos by Daniel Chamberlin. "Way to Go Ohio" — Oliver Hall's interview with Chrissie Hynde and James Walbourne of The Pretenders, with Lauren Bilanko's photography. "American Beauties" — an expanded excerpt from Eddie Dean's Pure Country, featuring extraordinary 1950s–60s country-festival photographs by amateur Leon Kagarise. "Pearl Diving" — Ian Nagoski on how labels and blogs are recovering lost musical gems. "Unite & Conquer" — a photo/design feature on the music/dance collective We Are the World. "Advanced Standing" — Greg Shewchuk reflects on skateboarding as practice, discipline and spiritual path. "The Analog Life" — Erik Davis argues the potential upsides of a slowing economy and slower time. • A centerfold of new comics curated by Buenaventura Press (artists include Matt Furie, Lisa Hanawalt, Anders Nilsen, Al Columbia, Charles Burns and more). Columns, food/folk-magic essays (Weedeater), tactical magic pieces, new-music roundups, and deep underground reviews by Byron Coley & Thurston Moore.
33	January 2013	A career-spanning, definitive interview and discography of late guitarist Jack Rose — a long, affectionate conversation recorded just months before his death, plus context on his place in Philadelphia's scene and his evolution from Pelt to solo work. A how-to conversation and self-portrait with cartoonist Roarin' Rick Veitch offering creative insight into dreaming and work. • An exploration of "applied magic(k)" from the Center for Tactical Magic framing alchemy, bank robbery lore, and economic disenchantment — including a tongue-in-cheek call for bank-heist proposals (with a $1,000 prize) that uses heist-planning as a ritualized exercise in strategy and risk. Other highlights . Practical urban foraging: a recipe for a weedy smoking mixture (mullein, marshmallow, catnip, lavender, mugwort, red osier dogwood) meant as both medicine and a barterable pocket offering. Essays on money, debt and creative labor: an Editor's Note by Jay Babcock reflecting on Arthur's financial collapse in 2008, the ethics of "follow your bliss," and the decision to charge for the relaunch so contributors can be paid. Music and culture miscellany: pieces on Waylon Jennings' darker moments, bath salts/border guards, homemade smokes, and reviews from writers including Byron Coley and Thurston Moore. Scene writing on Philly's post-industrial music nexus and personal remembrances of shows and local community. Design and contributors • Art direction by Yasmin Khan, art and comics from a range of contributors (including Jason Leivian/Floating World Comics), and a broad advisory council and contributor list. The issue mixes longform interviews, archival recollections, practical guides, and provocative cultural criticism.
34	April 2013	Cover feature: Byron Coley's deep, footnoted profile of psych‑folk lifer Matt Valentine (MV & EE), tracing his life, aesthetics and persistence as an independent artist. Music & scene pieces: features on Feeding People (Orange County psych/garage band), an appreciation of the Melvins' best work, a piece on ecstatic cartographer David Chaim Smith, and more reviews and comics throughout. Nance Klehm on better home‑brewing and beekeeping: a hands‑on account of working with a fifth‑generation beekeeper in the Sonoran landscape, plus practical DIY fermentation recipes (Frank Cook's dried‑fruit "wine," spit potato chicha/beer, potato vodka) and the idea of honey as fuel. Applied Magic(k): an essay linking occult traditions, anarchism and popular struggle, exploring secret societies, political magic and the creative power of collective action. Austin Grossman interview: a wide‑ranging conversation about his novel You, video games as storytelling, the industry's evolution ('90s to present) and game development culture. Extras: comics curated by Jason Leivian/Floating World Comics, art (including Arik Roper), a spirited editor's note from Jay Babcock celebrating Byron Coley's new Senior Writer role, and the magazine's regular assortment of reviews, features and oddities.
35	August 2013	Highlights include an intimate profile of Woodland Jewel Mushrooms — a family-run oyster and shiitake farm outside Philadelphia — with recipes, cultivation notes and a conversation about the medicinal and economic promise of fungi. There's an extended, immersive piece from inside Baltimore's T Hill (aka Tarantula Hill) about Twig Harper's experimental salvia work, now combined with an isolation tank and a methodical approach to plant‑based consciousness practice. Politics and technology collide in a sharp essay from the Center for Tactical Magic on drone warfare, accountability and the metaphors of modern "magic(k)." Music features thread through the issue: an interview with Norm Fetter (Enumclaw) about moving from urban life to rural mushroom farming and quieter music, plus pieces and listings calling out Bernie Krause on natural soundscapes, Coltrane in orbit, folk surrealist Michael Hurley, and more. You'll also find short columns and housekeeping notes (apologies for a missed art credit, contributor updates, socials), a report on automata and The Turk, and practical morsels like oyster mushroom soup and veggie‑burger recipes.
