= Ioan Petru Culianu =

Romanian academic (1950–1991)

- Born: January 5, 1950; Iași, People's Republic of Romania
- Died: May 21, 1991 (aged 41); Chicago, Illinois, United States
- Cause of death: Shooting
- Citizenship: Romania

Academic background
- Education: University of Bucharest; Università Cattolica del Sacro Cuore; Paris-Sorbonne University
- Theses: Gnosticismo e pensiero contemporaneo: Hans Jonas (1985); Recherches sur les dualismes d'Occident. Analyse de leurs principaux mythes (1987)
- Doctoral advisor: Ugo Bianchi; Michel Meslin
- Influences: Mircea Eliade

Academic work
- Discipline: History of religion
- Institutions: University of Groningen; University of Chicago
- Doctoral students: Alexander Argüelles
- Notable works: Eros and Magic (1984)

Ioan Petru Culianu or Couliano (5 January 1950 – 21 May 1991) was a Romanian historian of religion, culture, and ideas, a philosopher and political essayist, and a short story writer. He served as professor of the history of religions at the University of Chicago from 1988 to his death, and had previously taught the history of Romanian culture at the University of Groningen.

An expert in Gnosticism and Renaissance magic, he befriended, was encouraged by Mircea Eliade, though he gradually distanced himself from his mentor. Culianu published seminal work on the interrelation of the occult, Eros, magic, physics, and history.

Culianu was murdered in 1991. It has been much speculated his murder was in consequence of his critical view of Romanian national politics. Some factions of the Romanian political right openly celebrated his murder. The Romanian Securitate, which he once lambasted as a force "of epochal stupidity", has also been suspected of involvement and of using puppet fronts on the right as cover.

== Biography ==
=== Education and career ===
Culianu was born in Iași, the son of Elena Bogdan (1907–2000), a chemistry professor at the University of Iași, and Sergiu-Andrei Culianu (1904–1964), a lawyer and a teacher. His maternal grandfather was Petru Bogdan, a chemistry professor and a Mayor of Iași, while one of his paternal grand-grandfathers was Nicolae Culianu, a professor of mathematics and astronomy.

He studied at the University of Bucharest, graduating in May 1972 with a major in Italian language and literature. He then traveled to Italy, where he was granted political asylum while attending lectures in Perugia in July 1972. He graduated in November 1975 from the Università Cattolica del Sacro Cuore in Milan with a doctorate in the history of religion; his thesis, Gnosticismo e pensiero contemporaneo: Hans Jonas, was written under the direction of Ugo Bianchi.

Culianu lived briefly in France and from 1976 to 1985 he taught at the University of Groningen in the Netherlands. He left Europe for the United States in 1986, becoming a permanent resident in January 1991. After a stint as visiting professor at the University of Chicago, he became a professor there; he was due to receive a permanent appointment in July 1991.

He took a second PhD at the University of Paris IV in January 1987, with the thesis Recherches sur les dualismes d'Occident. Analyse de leurs principaux mythes ("Research into Western Dualisms. An Analysis of their Major Myths"), coordinated by Michel Meslin. Having completed three doctorates and being proficient in six languages, Culianu specialized in Renaissance magic and mysticism. He became a friend, and later the literary executor, of Mircea Eliade, the famous historian of religions. He also wrote fiction and political articles.

Culianu had divorced his first wife, and at the time of his death was engaged to Hillary Wiesner, a 27-year-old graduate student at Harvard University.

=== Death ===
On Tuesday, May 21, 1991, at noon, just minutes after concluding a conversation with his doctoral student, Alexander Argüelles, on a day when the building was teeming with visitors to a book sale, Culianu was murdered in the bathroom of Swift Hall, of the University of Chicago Divinity School. He was shot once in the back of the head with a .25 caliber automatic weapon. The identity of the killer and the motive are still unknown.

Speculation arose that he had been killed by former Securitate agents, due to political articles in which he attacked the Communist regime. The murder occurred a year and a half after the Romanian Revolution of December 1989 and Nicolae Ceaușescu's death.

Before being killed, he had published a number of articles and interviews that heavily criticized the Ion Iliescu post-Revolution regime, making Culianu one of the government's most vocal adversaries. Several theories link his murder with the Romanian Intelligence Service, which was widely perceived as the successor of the Securitate; several pages of Culianu's Securitate files are inexplicably missing. Some reports suggest that Culianu had been threatened by anonymous phone calls in the days leading up to his killing.

Ultra-nationalist and neo-fascist involvement, as part of an Iron Guard revival in connection with the nationalist discourse of the late years of Ceauşescu's rule and the rise of the Vatra Românească and România Mare parties, was not itself excluded from the scenario; according to Vladimir Tismăneanu: "[Culianu] gave the most devastating indictment of the new union of far left and far right in Romania". As part of his criticism of the Iron Guard, Culianu had come to expose Mircea Eliade's connections with the latter movement during the interwar years (because of this, relations between the two academics had soured for the final years of Eliade's life).

Culianu was buried at Eternitatea Cemetery in Iași.

== Works ==
=== Scholarly works ===
- Mircea Eliade, Assisi, Cittadella Editrice, 1978; Roma, Settimo Sigillo, 2008(2); Mircea Eliade, București, Nemira, 1995, 1998(2); Iași, Polirom, 2004(3)
- Iter in Silvis: Saggi scelti sulla gnosi e altri studi, Gnosis, no. 2, Messina, EDAS, 1981
- Religione e accrescimento del potere, in G. Romanato, M. Lombardo, I.P. Culianu, Religione e potere, Torino, Marietti, 1981
- Psychanodia: A Survey of the Evidence Concerning the Ascension of the Soul and Its Relevance, Leiden, Brill, 1983
- Éros et Magie à la Renaissance. 1484, Paris, Flammarion, 1984; Eros and Magic in the Renaissance, Chicago, University of Chicago Press, 1987; Eros e magia nel Rinascimento: La congiunzione astrologica del 1484, Milano, Il Saggiatore – A. Mondadori, 1987; Eros şi magie în Renaştere. 1484, București, Nemira, 1994, 1999(2); Iaşi, Polirom, 2003(3), 2011, 2015; Eros y magia en el Renacimiento. 1484, Madrid, Ediciones Siruela, 1999
- Expériences de l'extase: Extase, ascension et récit visionnaire de l'hellénisme au Moyen Age, Paris, Payot, 1984; Experienze dell'estasi dall'Ellenismo al Medioevo, Bari, Laterza, 1986
- Gnosticismo e pensiero moderno: Hans Jonas, Roma, L'Erma di Bretschneider, 1985
- Recherches sur les dualismes d'Occident: Analyse de leurs principaux mythes, Lille, Lille-Thèses, 1986; I miti dei dualismi occidentali, Milano, Jaca Book, 1989
- Les Gnoses dualistes d'Occident: Histoire et mythes, Paris, Plon, 1990; The Tree of Gnosis, New York, HarperCollins, 1992; Gnozele dualiste ale Occidentului. Istorie si mituri, București, Nemira, 1995; Iaşi, Polirom, 2002(2), 2013
- Out of this World: Otherworldly Journeys from Gilgamesh to Albert Einstein, Boston, Shambhala, 1991; Mas alla de este mundo, Barcelona, Paidos Orientalia, 1993; Călătorii in lumea de dincolo, București, Nemira, 1994, 1999(2); Iași, Polirom, 2003(3), 2007, 2015; Jenseits dieser Welt, Munchen, Eugen Diederichs Verlag, 1995
- I viaggi dell'anima, Milano, Arnoldo Mondadori Editore, 1991
- The Tree of Gnosis : Gnostic Mythology from Early Christianity to Modern Nihilism, San Francisco, HarperCollins, 1992; Arborele gnozei. Mitologia gnostică de la creştinismul timpuriu la nihilismul modern, București, Nemira, 1999; Iasi, Polirom, 2005, 2015
- Experiences del extasis, Barcelona, Paidos Orientalia, 1994; Experienţe ale extazului, București, Nemira, 1997; Iași, Polirom, 2004(2)
- Religie şi putere, București, Nemira, 1996; Iași, Polirom, 2005
- Psihanodia, București, Nemira, 1997, Iași, Polirom, 2006
- Păcatul împotriva spiritului. Scrieri politice, București, Nemira, 1999; Iași, Polirom, 2005, 2013
- Studii româneşti I. Fantasmele nihilismului. Secretul Doctorului Eliade, București, Nemira, 2000; Iași, Polirom, 2006
- "Studii românești II. Soarele și Luna. Otrăvurile admirației", Iași, Polirom, 2009
- "Iter in silvis I. Eseuri despre gnoză și alte studii", Iași, Polirom, 2012
- "Iter in silvis II. Gnoză și magie", Iași, Polirom, 2013
- Jocurile minţii. Istoria ideilor, teoria culturii, epistemologie, Iaşi, Polirom, 2002
- Iocari serio. Ştiinţa şi arta în gîndirea Renaşterii, Iaşi, Polirom, 2003
- Cult, magie, erezii. Articole din enciclopedii ale religiilor, Iaşi, Polirom, 2003
- Marsilio Ficino (1433–1499) si problemele platonismului in Renastere, Iasi, Polirom, 2015
- Dialoguri intrerupte. Corespondenta Mircea Eliade-Ioan Petru Culianu, Iasi, Polirom, 2004, 2013 (2)

==== Co-author ====
- With Mircea Eliade and H.S. Wiesner: Dictionnaire des Religions, Avec la collaboration de H.S. Wiesner. Paris, Plon, 1990, 1992(2); The Eliade Guide to World Religions, Harper, San Francisco, 1991; Handbuch der Religionen, Zürich und München, Artemis-Winkler-Verlag, 1991; Suhrkamp-Taschenbuch, 1995; Diccionario de las religiones Barcelona, Paidos Orientalia, 1993; Dicţionarul religiilor, București, Humanitas, 1993, 1996(2); Iași, Polirom, 2007
- The Encyclopedia of Religion, Collier Macmillan, New York, 1987
- The HarperCollins Concise Guide to World Religions, Harper, San Francisco, 2000

=== Fiction ===
- La collezione di smeraldi. Racconti, Milano, Jaca Book, 1989
- Hesperus, București, Univers, 1992; București, Nemira, 1998(2); Iaşi, Polirom, 2003(3)
- Pergamentul diafan. Povestiri, București, Nemira, 1994
- Pergamentul diafan. Ultimele povestiri, București, Nemira, 1996(2); Iaşi, Polirom, 2002(3)
- Arta fugii. Povestiri, Iași, Polirom, 2002
- Jocul de smarald, Iași, Polirom, 2005, 2011(2)
- Tozgrec, Iași, Polirom, 2010

=== Other ===
- Dialoguri întrerupte. Corespondența Mircea Eliade – Ioan Petru Culianu, Iași, Polirom, 2004

== Works about Culianu ==
- A biography and an analysis of his death was published by Ted Anton under the title Eros, Magic, and the Murder of Professor Culianu, 2013, (alluding to Culianu's most influential work, Eros and Magic in the Renaissance).
- Saul Bellow alludes to Culianu's murder in his novella Ravelstein, 2000, with the protagonist (based on Bellow) and his friend Ravelstein (based on Allan Bloom) speculating that the murder was perpetrated by far-right activists.
- Elemire Zolla, Ioan Petru Culianu, Alberto Tallone Editore, 1994.
- Umberto Eco, Murder in Chicago, in The New York Review of Books, April 10, 1997
- Sorin Antohi (ed.), Religion, Fiction, and History. Essays in Memory of Ioan Petru Culianu, Volumes I-II, Bucharest, Nemira, 2001.
- Sorin Antohi (coordinator), Ioan Petru Culianu. Omul și opera, Iași, Polirom, 2003
- Matei Călinescu, Despre Ioan Petru Culianu și Mircea Eliade. Amintiri, lecturi, reflecții, Iași, Polirom, 2002, 2005(2).
- Andrei Oișteanu, Religie, politică şi mit. Texte despre Mircea Eliade și Ioan Petru Culianu, Polirom, Iași, 2007 (ediția a doua, revăzuta, adăugita și ilustrată, Polirom, Iași, 2014)
- Marcello De Martino, Mircea Eliade esoterico. Ioan Petru Culianu e i "non detti", Roma, Settimo Sigillo, 2008.
- Olga Gorshunova, Terra Incognita of Ioan Culianu, in Etnograficheskoe Obozrenie, 2008 № 6:94-110. ISSN 0869-5415
- Raul Popescu, Ioan Petru Culianu. Ipostazele unui eretic, Eikon, Bucuresti, 2017.

== See also ==
- List of homicides in Illinois
