= Dreamspell =

Esoteric calendar and game inspired, in part, by the Maya calendar

The Journey of Timeship Earth 2013
- The Dreamspell Logo
- Designers: José Argüelles; Lloydine Argüelles
- Illustrators: Heidi Mecklenburg
- Publishers: Chelsea Pacific 1990
- Years active: Perpetual Calendar
- Languages: English, Spanish
- Systems: Tzolkin, Haab, I Ching
- Players: 260
- Playing time: 26 years (1987-2013)

The Dreamspell is an esoteric calendar in part inspired by the Maya calendar by New Age spiritualist, Mayanist philosopher, and author José Argüelles and Lloydine Burris Argüelles. The Dreamspell calendar was initiated in 1987 and released as a board game in 1990.

== Description ==
=== General overview ===
This is loosely based on the 365-day solar calendar called the Haab, but most importantly focused on the 260-day sacred calendar called the Tzolkin, which Jose and Lloydine Argüelles claimed to be based on a fourth-dimensional pattern called a "galactic spin". Argüelles interprets this calendar as part of what he calls a 'radiogenetic game board' that relates to both the I-Ching, the 64-unit DNA code, and many other "divinatory" systems, including the cosmology of Ibn al-Arabi of the 28 lunar mansions and the 22 Major Arcana of the Tarot.

=== Significance of the number 13 ===
The number 13 in the Dreamspell calendar appears both as the "galactic tone" of the daily galactic signature, as well as in the 13 Moons of 28 days each are the "months" of the calendar. The 13 Moons are named after the 13 galactic tones. The names of the 13 galactic tones are: Magnetic, Lunar, Electric, Self-Existing, Overtone, Rhythmic, Resonant, Galactic, Solar, Planetary, Spectral, Crystal, and Cosmic.

=== Twenty solar seals representing the days ===
The names of the 20 solar seals used to name the days are Red Dragon, White Wind, Blue Night, Yellow Seed, Red Serpent, White World-Bridger, Blue Hand, Yellow Star, Red Moon, White Dog, Blue Monkey, Yellow Human, Red Skywalker, White Wizard, Blue Eagle, Yellow Warrior, Red Earth, White Mirror, Blue Storm, and Yellow Sun. These 20 solar seals are continually repeated in a 20-day cycle. The 20-day cycle repeated 13 times (20 × 13) equals 260 days or one Tzolkin or "galactic spin" as it is called in the Dreamspell: Journey of Timeship Earth 2013

=== 260 possible different names for the days ===
The name of the solar seal of the day (of 20 solar seals) and the name of the galactic tone (of 13 tones) combine to create a galactic signature for every day. This generates a list of 20 × 13 = 260 possible day names (galactic signatures).

=== Seven-day week ===
The calendar also uses the seven-day heptad. The seven day names are Dali, Seli, Gamma, Kali, Alpha, Limi, and Sillio.

Each day of the 7-day week of the 13-Moon calendar is assigned a glyph (distinct from the 20 solar seals for the dates) that is also one of four colors red, white, blue, or yellow — Dali's glyph is yellow, Seli's glyph is red, Gamma's glyph is white, Kali's glyph is blue, Alpha's glyph is yellow, Limi's glyph is red, and Sillio's glyph is white.

In the system of the 13-Moon calendar, these seven day energies also correspond to the seven chakras. However, the chakras each day represents are not in the same order as the placement of the chakras on the body, but according to a spiral pattern that Argüelles provides on his website: https://lawoftime.org

The glyph for Dali (yellow) symbolizes the sahasrara chakra (seventh chakra); the glyph for Seti (red) symbolized the muladhara chakra (first chakra); the glyph for Gamma (white) symbolizes the ajna (sixth chakra); the glyph for Kali (blue) symbolizes the svadhisthana (second chakra); the glyph for Alpha (yellow) symbolizes the vishuddha (fifth chakra); the glyph for Limi (red) symbolizes the manipura (third chakra); and the glyph for Sillio (white) symbolizes the anahata (fourth chakra).

Since seven is a factor of 28, the 1st of each month is always a Dali and the 28th of each month is always a Silio.

The intercalary day at the end of the year, since it is not part of any month, is also not part of any week either. Thus every date of every month always occurs on exactly the same day. This system of every date always occurring on the same day of the week and not including the year end day in any month or as any day of the week is standard for a 13-month calendar.

Of course the days of the week do not correlate with the days of the week named on the Gregorian calendar since the "day out of time" (25 July) is not assigned as being any day of the week.

=== Leap years ===
The 13 Moon calendar simply counts leap years as a "0.0 Hunab Ku" day – which is also no day of the week or month. Nor is it one of the 260 galactic signatures. This allows the mathematical system of the calendar, which Argüelles calls the "synchronic order", to remain intact. In short, this creates an even cycle which repeats perfectly every 52 years. For example, if today is Magnetic Moon Dali 1, Red Magnetic Dragon – 52 years from now it will be again, Magnetic Moon Dali 1, Red Magnetic Dragon. This allows every date in the Dreamspell calendar to always synchronize perfectly with a date in the Gregorian calendar – in other words, February 29 will always be 0.0 Hunab Ku. In the original Mesoamerican calendar, there were 13 days not part of any month at the end of a 52-year cycle to account for leap years.

The date called in the Gregorian calendar 29 February falls every four years between 22 Galactic and 23 Galactic. In the original Roman calendar, a lunisolar calendar, a 13th leap month called Mercedonius was periodically inserted between 23 February and 24 February to keep the calendar in line with the solar year. In most 13-month calendars, the leap year day is added every four years as an intercalary day between the year end day and the New Year's Day. However, doing this to the Dreamspell 13 Moon calendar would bring the calendar out of sync with the 52-year cycle where the galactic signature and day of the year return every 52 years.

If the Gregorian calendar weren't in existence at all, the 0.0 Hunab Ku would still be the necessary intercalary day to keep the 52-year cycle (of 18,980 days) intact.

=== Numbering of the years ===
So far there is no "official" numbering system for the years. The years are simply named after the first day of the year. For example, a year that begins with a "Blue Magnetic Storm" day is called "Blue Magnetic Storm Year". This creates a cycle of 52 years, made out of four cycles of 13 years each. The basis of the Dreamspell Calendar is that time is not linear, but cyclic, and so does not require a strict "numbering" of years.

However, Argüelles recently address this issue because many followers of the calendar inquired how to number the days. He explained a system, similar to the dating system of the Mayan calendar (for example, 13.0.0.0.0). The system simply counts from the first year of the Dreamspell (1987), with the initials "NS" – standing for "New Sirius" cycle, since the 52-year cycle of the Dreamspell calendar is the same as the 52 years it takes Sirius B to orbit Sirius A. For example, if it is 23 years after the beginning of the Dreamspell, moon 1, day 2, the date is "NS1.23.1.2"

This system, as mentioned above, is similar to the dating system of the "Mayan calendar" cycle which "ends" on December 21, 2012. However, there have recently been discovered dated Mayan artifacts which predict dates well into the future, far beyond 2012:

It is interesting that recent decodings of the hieroglyphs at Palenque, which are understood to have been made during the reign of Pacal the Great, refer to dates beyond the end of the Long Count calendar. On the Tablet of the Inscriptions at Palenque a date of 1.0.0.0.0.8 5 Lamat 1 Mol can be inferred – otherwise known as 21 October 4772, almost 3000 years in the future. Perhaps we can deduce from this that Pacal himself believed that the end of the fifth age did not represent the end of time or of the Earth, and that his name would be still mentioned in the sixth age.

== Purpose ==
According to José and Lloydine Argüelles, two of the main purposes of the Dreamspell calendar are:

1. To synchronize human beings with our "galactic roots" by tuning us in to the spiritual energy from Hunab Ku, a being Argüelles asserts is the governing deity of the Milky Way Galaxy.
2. To convert humanity from thinking that "Time is Money" to thinking that "Time is Art" and thus give human beings more scope for their creativity.

== Popularity ==
The anthropologist Will Black conducted research into José and Lloydine Argüelles’ Planet Art Network (PAN) for several years. In his 2010 book Beyond the End of the World – 2012 and Apocalypse, Black documented a general loss of interest in Dreamspell and in PAN.

Black points out that as general interest in the 2012 phenomenon increased as a result of the proximity of the "end date", the significance of PAN and the value placed on Argüelles’ ideas waned. Although the Argüelles' and their Dreamspell system was instrumental in encouraging people to consider the meaning of 2012, further investigation by individuals tended to cause people to look beyond Argüelles’ system, according to Black. In fact, interest in 2012 snowballed so rapidly that many of those who latterly became interested in 2012 may have been quite oblivious to the early contribution of Argüelles.

Following the world's failure to end in 2012, the calendar once again faded into obscurity.
