= Mayanism =

Collection of New Age beliefs

Mayanism is a non-codified eclectic collection of New Age beliefs, influenced in part by Pre-Columbian Maya mythology and some folk beliefs of the modern Maya peoples.

Contemporary Mayanism places less emphasis on contacts between the ancient Maya and lost lands than in the work of early writers such as Godfrey Higgins, Charles Étienne Brasseur de Bourbourg and Augustus Le Plongeon, alluding instead to possible contacts with extraterrestrial life. However, it continues to include references to Atlantis. Notions about extraterrestrial influence on the Maya can be traced to the book Chariots of the Gods? by Erich von Däniken, whose ancient astronaut theories were in turn influenced by the work of Peter Kolosimo and especially the team of Jacques Bergier and Louis Pauwels, authors of Le Matin des magiciens. These latter writers were inspired by the fantasy literature of H. P. Lovecraft and publications by Charles Fort. However, there remain elements of fascination with lost continents and lost civilizations, especially as popularized by 19th century science fiction and speculative fiction by authors such as Jules Verne, Edward Bulwer-Lytton, and H. Rider Haggard.

Mayanism experienced a revival in the 1970s through the work of Frank Waters, a writer on the subject of Hopi mythology. His Book of the Hopi is rejected "as largely ersatz by Hopi traditionalists". In 1970, Waters was the recipient of a Rockefeller Foundation grant to support research in Mexico and Central America. This resulted in his 1975 book Mexico Mystique: The Coming Sixth World of Consciousness, a discussion of Mesoamerican culture strongly colored by Waters' beliefs in astrology, prophecy, and the lost continent of Atlantis. It has gained new momentum in the context of the 2012 phenomenon, especially as presented in the work of New Age author John Major Jenkins, who asserts that Mayanism is "the essential core ideas or teachings of Maya religion and philosophy" in his 2009 book The 2012 Story: The Myths, Fallacies, and Truth Behind the Most Intriguing Date in History.

Mayanism has gained renewed vigor due to pseudoscientific nonfiction by authors such as Erich von Däniken, Zecharia Sitchin, and Graham Hancock, whose theories range from invoking ancient astronauts and other extraterrestrials from outer space to revivals of the idea that ancient peoples from lost lands brought wisdom and technology to the Mayas. The implication of this is that the Mayas had access to aspects of ancient knowledge, spiritualism, philosophy, and religion that are useful for coping with the modern world, whether by avoiding Armageddon, embracing a mystical Apocalypse, or constructing a future Utopia.

Mayanism has a complex history that draws from many different sources on the fringes of mainstream archaeology. It has gained growing attention through its influence on popular culture through pulp fiction, science fiction, fantasy literature, and more recently cinema, graphic novels, fantasy role-playing games, and video games. It has also drawn inspiration from the success of The Celestine Prophecy by James Redfield, a novel that refers to the fictional discovery of a Pre-Columbian self-help manuscript in South America.

Mayanism has been promoted by specific publishing houses, most notably Inner Traditions – Bear & Company, which has produced a number of books on the theme of 2012 by authors such as José Argüelles, John Major Jenkins, Carl Johan Calleman, and Barbara Hand Clow. Jeremy P. Tarcher, Inc. has published works by New Age authors Daniel Pinchbeck and John Major Jenkins that have further contributed to a growing interest in Mayanism.

== History ==
Mayanism can be traced to sources such as the sixteenth-century book Utopia by Thomas More, who developed the concept of a utopia in the New World (an idea first explored by Christopher Columbus in his 1501 Book of Prophecies). During the eighteenth century, speculations about the origins of ancient Maya civilization sought to associate Maya history with Biblical stories of Noah's Ark, the Tower of Babel, and the Ten Lost Tribes of Israel. This included speculation about legendary culture heroes such as Votan and Quetzalcoatl.

In the early nineteenth century, Alexander von Humboldt and Lord Kingsborough contributed further to such speculation. Humboldt and Kingsborough were in turn cited by Godfrey Higgins, whose Anacalypsis (1833) contributed to the emergence of perennial philosophy and claims that all religions had a common, ancient origin in a Golden Age of the distant past.

In the late nineteenth-century, Charles Étienne Brasseur de Bourbourg made significant academic contributions (including re-discovery of the Popol Vuh), but towards the end of his career became convinced that the ancient Maya culture could be traced to the lost continent of Atlantis. For example, in 1857 Brasseur identified Votan as a Phoenician ruler who founded Palenque and in an article published in 1872 attributed mythological Mesoamerican cataclysms to an early version of pole shift theory. Brasseur's work, some of which was illustrated by the talented but very inaccurate Jean-Frédéric Waldeck, influenced other works of pseudoscience and pseudohistory, such as the research of Désiré Charnay, Augustus Le Plongeon, Ignatius L. Donnelly, and James Churchward. Le Plongeon and Donnelly in turn influenced the work of writers such as Madame Blavatsky who brought misconceptions about the ancient Maya into early New Age circles. These ideas became part of a belief system fostered by psychic Edgar Cayce in the early twentieth century and later popularized in the 1960s by author Jess Stearn. One example of early Mayanism is the creation of a group called the Mayan Temple by Harold D. Emerson of Brooklyn, a self-proclaimed Maya priest who edited a serial publication titled The Mayan, Devoted to Spiritual Enlightenment and Scientific Religion between 1933 and 1941. Attempts at a synthesis of religion and science, a common theme in Mayanism, are one of the contributions from Theosophy while Emerson would be an early example of a plastic shaman in Mayanism.

== Basic beliefs ==
Mayanism has no central doctrine. However, a basic premise is that the ancient Maya understood aspects of the human experience and human consciousness that remain poorly understood in modern Western culture. This includes insights into cosmology and eschatology as well as lost knowledge of advanced technology and ecology that, when known, can be used to improve the human condition and create a future Utopia. However, as a New Age belief system, Mayanism scorns academic scholarship, giving preference to knowledge gained through revelation and prophecy and to traditional knowledge. The beliefs of Mayanism tend to be characterized by a combination of esotericism and syncretism, rather than being the result of either formal controlled field research or detailed scholarly research that has been based on a broad range of primary sources.

== December 21, 2012 ==
The significance of this date in Mayanism stems from the ending of the current baktun cycle of the Maya calendar in 2012, which many believed would create a global "consciousness shift" and the beginning of a new age. This has come to be known as the 2012 phenomenon. Speculation about this date can be traced to the first edition of The Maya (1966) by Michael D. Coe, in which he suggested the date of December 24, 2011 as one on which the Maya believed "Armageddon would overtake the degenerate peoples of the world and all creation." This date became the subject of speculation by Frank Waters, who devotes two chapters to its interpretation, including discussion of an astrological chart for this date and its association with Hopi prophecies in Mexico Mystique: The Coming Sixth World of Consciousness (1975). The significance of the year 2012 (but not a specific day) was mentioned briefly by José Argüelles in The Transformative Vision: Reflections on the Nature and History of Human Expression (1975) and (without reference to the ancient Maya) by Terence McKenna and Dennis McKenna in The Invisible Landscape: Mind, Hallucinogens, and the I Ching (1975).

Waters' book inspired further speculation in the mid-1980s, including revision of the date by the McKennas, Argüelles, and John Major Jenkins to one corresponding with the winter solstice in 2012. Interpretations of the date became the subject of further speculation by José Argüelles in The Mayan Factor: Path Beyond Technology (1987), promoted for the 1987 Harmonic Convergence. It received further elaboration in the Novelty theory of Terence McKenna. The supposed prediction of an astronomical conjunction of the black hole at the center of the Milky Way galaxy with the winter solstice Sun on December 21, 2012, referred to by Jenkins in Maya Cosmogenesis 2012: The True Meaning of the Maya Calendar End-Date (1998) and Galactic Alignment:The Transformation of Consciousness According to Mayan, Egyptian, and Vedic Traditions (2002) as having been predicted by the ancient Maya and others, is a much-anticipated event in Mayanism. Although Jenkins suggests that ancient Maya knowledge of this event was based on observations of the Dark Rift in the Milky Way as seen from Earth (this dark rift, it is said by some Mayan scholars, was believed by some Mayans to be one of the entrances to Xibalba), others see it as evidence of knowledge imparted via ancient contact with extraterrestrial intelligence. The relevance of modern Dark Rift observations to pre-Columbian and traditional Maya beliefs is strongly debated, and academic archaeologists reject all theories regarding extraterrestrial contact, but it is clear that the promotion of Mayanism through interest in 2012 is contributing to the evolution of religious syncretism in contemporary Maya communities. Psychonaut author Daniel Pinchbeck popularized New Age concepts about this date, linking it to beliefs about crop circles, alien abduction, and personal revelations based on the use of entheogens and mediumship in his 2006 book 2012: The Return of Quetzalcoatl.

Carl Johan Calleman differs in that he sees 28 October 2011 and not 21 December 2012 as the pivotal end date. Calleman does not see the date as an apocalypse but a slow transformation of consciousness with people beginning to experience a higher 'unity consciousness'.

== Mayanism, shamanism, and "Toltecs" ==
Shamanism has become a significant component of Mayanism, in part due to the scholarly interpretation of ancient Maya rulers as shamans and the popularity of Carlos Castaneda, whose books described his apprenticeship to a Yaqui sorcerer. However, Castaneda's work is seen as being fictional, inaccurate, misleading, and plagiaristic, and there is substantial evidence to support the interpretation that both "Carlos" (a character in Castaneda's books) and don Juan (the sorcerer) are fictional creations. Although the Yaqui are indigenous to the Sonoran Desert region of northern Mexico and southern Arizona, far from the Maya region, Mayanism often conflates the concept of Toltec (Castaneda) with the Toltec who interacted with the ancient Maya. This stems from 19th century speculations by Brasseur and Charnay about the Toltecs as a white, Aryan race that brought advanced civilization to the Americas either through a migration from Asia across the Bering Strait (according to Charnay) or emigration from the lost continent of Atlantis (according to Brasseur).

== See also ==
- David Icke
- Dreamspell is a calendar invented by José Argüelles that is a modern interpretation of the Maya calendar.
- List of topics characterized as pseudoscience
