= Alexander Argüelles =

American linguist (born 1964)

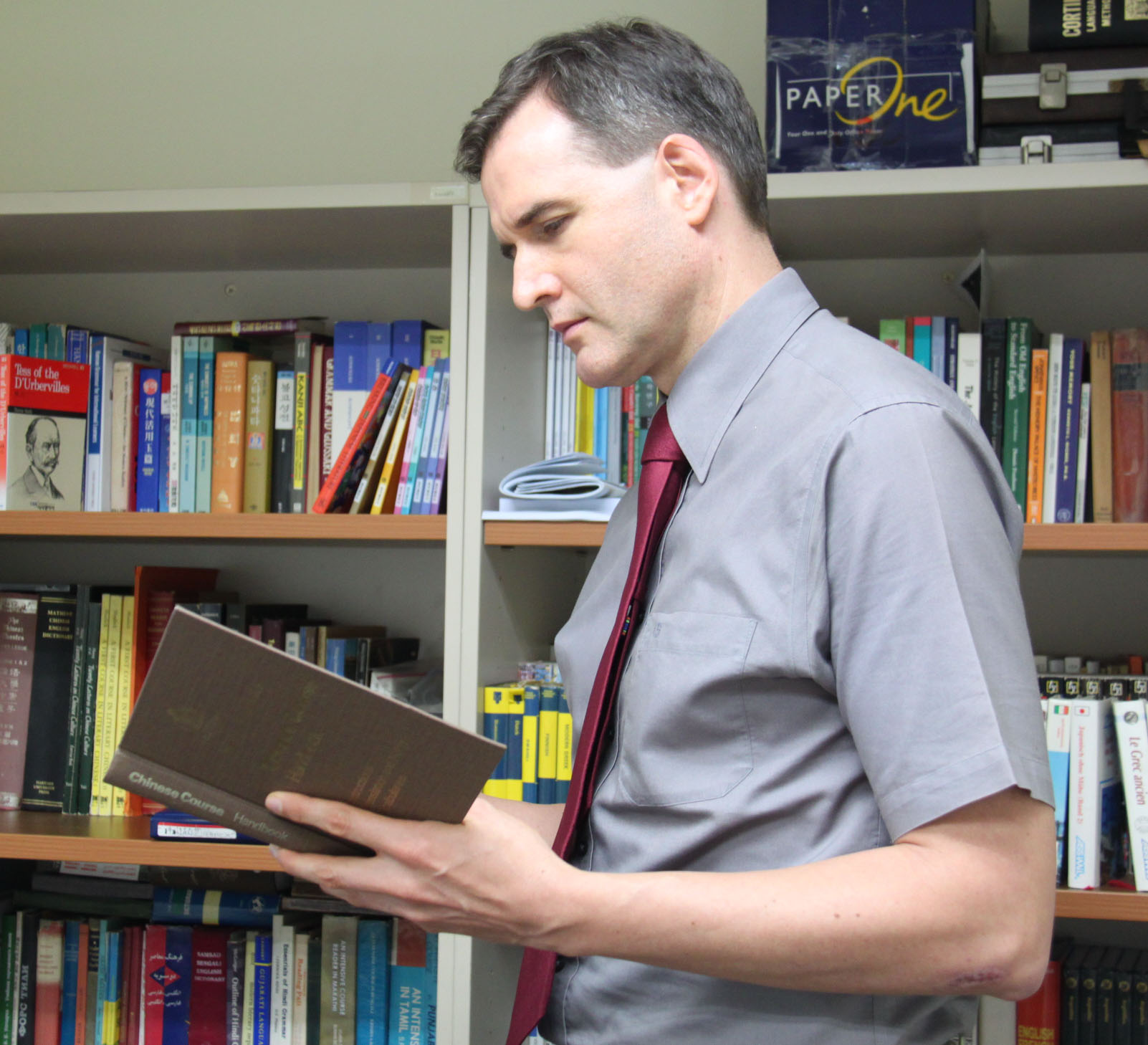
- Argüelles in 2011
- Born: 30 April 1964 (age 62); Chicago, Illinois, U.S.
- Spouse: Park Hyun-Kyung
- Children: 2

Academic background
- Education: Columbia University (B.A.); University of Chicago (M.A., Ph.D.); Freie Universität Berlin
- Thesis: Viking Dreams: Mythological and Religious Dream Symbolism in the Old Norse Sagas (1994)
- Doctoral advisor: Wendy Doniger
- Other advisor: Ioan P. Culianu

Academic work
- Discipline: Linguist
- Institutions: Handong University (1996–2004); American University of Science and Technology (2004–2006); New College of California (2006–2009); SEAMEO Regional Language Centre (2009–2012); American University in the Emirates (2012–2019); Concordia Language Villages (2019–2021)
- Main interests: Second-language acquisition; Language pedagogy; Korean language
- Website: alexanderarguelles.com

Alexander Sabino Argüelles (Note: The original Spanish pronunciation of Argüelles is [aɾˈɣweʎes].) (born 30 April 1964) is an American linguist notable for his work on the Korean language. An avid language learner, he was profiled in Michael Erard's Babel No More. He is one of the polyglots listed in Kenneth Hyltenstam's Advanced Proficiency and Exceptional Ability in Second Languages, and has been described by The New Yorker as "a legendary figure in the [polyglot] community".

Argüelles is highly proficient in 10 languages: English, Spanish, French, German, Italian, Portuguese, Dutch, Catalan, Swedish and Korean, and has a knowledge of more than 60 languages.

== Career ==
He has taught in South Korea, Lebanon, Singapore, and Dubai, and was a Group Director of Immersion Language Programs at Concordia Language Villages in Bemidji, Minnesota.

== Language learning ==
Argüelles reportedly devotes an average of nine hours a day to language learning, though he has stated that in his twenties he spent as much as sixteen hours per day. He advocates working on multiple languages daily for shorter periods (as little as 15 minutes), working on different areas in different languages, from reading novels, to writing grammatical exercises. He sets daily goals to language learning and has recorded his daily progress in logbooks going back over 20 years.

Argüelles is highly proficient in 10 languages: English, Spanish, French, German, Italian, Portuguese, Dutch, Catalan, Swedish and Korean, and is accomplished in many more, such as Latin, Greek and Sanskrit, which he had studied by the end of college. He has studied over 60 languages to various degrees of proficiency. He stated in late 2022 that he had learning resources in his library for 155 languages.

== Personal life ==
He is the son of the poet Ivan Argüelles and the nephew of the New Ageist José Argüelles.

== Notable works ==
=== On Korean ===
- Argüelles, Alexander, and Jong-Rok Kim (2000). A Historical, Literary and Cultural Approach to the Korean Language. Seoul: Hollym.
- Argüelles, Alexander, and Jong-Rok Kim (2004). A Handbook of Korean Verbal Conjugation. Hyattsville, Maryland: Dunwoody Press.
- Argüelles, Alexander (2007). Korean Newspaper Reader. Hyattsville, Maryland: Dunwoody Press.
- Argüelles, Alexander (2010). North Korean Reader. Hyattsville, Maryland: Dunwoody Press.

=== Other works ===
- Argüelles, Alexander (1994). Viking Dreams: Mythological and Religious Dream Symbolism in the Old Norse Sagas. Doctoral dissertation, University of Chicago.
- Argüelles, Alexander (1999). 프랑스동사변화안내: La Conjugaison des Verbes. Seoul: 신아사.
- Argüelles, Alexander (2006). English French Spanish German Dictionary. Beirut, Lebanon: Librairie du Liban.
