= Ivan Argüelles =

American poet (1939–2024)

- Born: January 24, 1939; Rochester, Minnesota, U.S.
- Died: April 28, 2024 (aged 85); Berkeley, California, U.S.
- Occupations: Poet; librarian
- Children: 2, including Alexander Argüelles
- Relatives: José Argüelles (twin brother)

Ivan Argüelles (January 24, 1939 – April 28, 2024) was an American poet whose work moved from early Beat- and surrealist-influenced forms to later epic-length poems. He received the Poetry Society of America's William Carlos Williams Award in 1989 as well as the Before Columbus Foundation's American Book Award in 2010.

Argüelles was the twin brother of the New Age writer José Argüelles and the father of the linguist Alexander Argüelles.

== Life and career ==
Ivan Argüelles, was born January 24, 1939, in Rochester, Minnesota, having been conceived nine months earlier in Mexico City where his parents, Enrique Argüelles, an artist and citizen of Mexico and Ethel Meyer Argüelles, of Minnesota, then lived. His mother returned with Ivan and his twin brother Jose to Mexico City, where they resided until 1944 when they moved to Mexicali and shortly thereafter to Los Angeles. Ivan was attending Playa Del Rey School in the first grade when his mother was diagnosed with tuberculosis. The family then uprooted again and went to Minnesota where his mother was placed in a sanitarium. After a stay with his maternal grandparents they got their own house in Rochester. There Ivan finished his elementary and high school education. Ivan's older sister Laurita was responsible for much of his upbringing and care while they lived in Mexico, and during the period their mother was in the sanitarium and convalescing.

While his father wanted Ivan and his brother Jose to become painters, Ivan decided to turn to poetry in his high school years. He received a national award for a poem he wrote in the 11th grade. While in college and during the decade of the 60s he continued to write however sporadically, chiefly efforts at experimental prose works on the model of James Joyce and William Burroughs. It was not until about 1970 that he turned seriously to writing poetry. At about the same time he became conscious of the Chicano movement and the work of Cesar Chavez. So it is no accident that much of his earlier poetry is infused both with the surrealistic style he then adopted and with themes relating to his own Mexican background.

After graduating from Rochester (Minn.) High School in 1956, Ivan then attended the University of Minnesota and the University of Chicago, where he received his BA in classics (1961). Later education includes a year at New York University (1962) and Vanderbilt University (1967–68) where he received an MLS in Library Science. He worked as a professional librarian at the New York Public Library, 1968–78 and at the University of California Berkeley, 1978–2001. Married since October 27, 1962, to Marilla Calhoun Elder, artist and activist, they have two sons, Alexander, a noted linguist, and Maximilian.

Argüelles's first poetry collection was Instamatic Reconditioning (1978), followed by The Invention of Spain (1978). During the late 70s and into the 80s his poems were frequently and widely published through many small press and poetry journals in the United States. In 1984 according to the Directory of Small Press Publishers he was ranked as the fourth most published poet in the country. This early period of his writing culminated in the book Looking for Mary Lou which received the 1989 William Carlos Williams Award from the Poetry Society of America (judge, June Jordan).

Beginning in 1990 he ceased writing what he refers to as "the daily poem" and turned to writing the long poem, the epic. He also founded, with Andrew Joron, Pantograph Press, which in 1992 published the first volume of his epic, the long poem "That" Goddess. While he continued to write during the next 10 years, sometimes collaborating with other poets, his published work continued to be in the vein of the book length poem. This creative direction culminated in the two-volume (867 pp.) poem Madonna Septet, published in 2000. Among works published since then of note is the collaboration with John M. Bennett, Chac Prostibulario, a multilingual experimental work. In 2009 he published a long poem formally based on Dante, titled Comedy, Divine, The. His selected early poems, The Death of Stalin, was published in 2010 (American Book Award Winner, Before Columbus Foundation). The unexpected death of his identical twin, José Argüelles, on March 22, 2011, prompted the rush of elegiac poems published in 2012, A Day in the Sun. In 2013 he received a Lifetime Achievement Award from the Before Columbus Foundation. He has been writing and getting books published with an almost annual regularity since 2010. Among these titles are: FIAT LUX, 2014; Orphic cantos, 2016; and Fragments from a gone world, 2017.

Argüelles died in Berkeley, California, on April 28, 2024, at the age of 85.

== Poetic style ==
As a young poet in the late fifties and early sixties, Argüelles felt the influence of the Beats, but also immersed himself in the literature of the Romance languages and High Modernism. Upon graduation from Vanderbilt, Argüelles was hired as a cataloger at the New York Public Library. It was there, in the library's poetry collection, that Argüelles discovered the poets of the New York School. As he later wrote in an autobiographical essay entitled "Asi Es la Vida,"."What was this idiom, this racy colloquial and yet often surreal mélange? I was still swinging with Dante and the troubadors. . . . And then there was the gateway to the French surrealists through Ashbery and O'Hara. . . . My mind was in flames, multiplying in all directions. . . . Between Vallejo and Breton my brain began to sunflower." But the turning point came with his discovery of the poetry of Philip Lamantia. As Argüelles stated, "Lamantia's mad, Beat-tinged American idiom surrealism had a very strong impact on me. Both intellectual and uninhibited, this was the dose for me." While Argüelles's early writings were rooted in neo-Beat bohemianism, surrealism, and Chicano culture, in the nineties he developed longer, epic-length forms, and eventually returned, after the first decade of the new millennium, to shorter, to often elegiac works exemplary of romantic modernism.

== List of books ==
- Instamatic Reconditioning, 1978
- The Invention of Spain, 1978
- Captive of the Vision of Paradise, 1982
- Tattooed Heart of the Drunken Sailor, 1983
- Manicomio, 1984
- What Are They Doing to My Animal?, 1984
- Nailed to the Coffin of Life, 1986
- The Structure of Hell, 1986
- Pieces of the Bone Text Still There, 1987
- Baudelaire's Brain, 1988
- Looking for Mary Lou: Illegal Syntax, 1989
- "That" Goddess, 1992
- Hapax Legomenon, 1993
- Tragedy of Momus (in the anthology Terminal Velocities), 1993
- Enigma & Variations, 1995
- Purisima Sex Addict II (with Jake Berry), 1997
- Dead/Requiem (with Jack Foley), 1998
- Saint James (with Jack Foley), 1998
- Madonna, a Poem, 1998
- Daya Karo, 1999
- City of Angels, 1999
- Madonna Septet, 2000
- Cosmic Karma Raga (with Peter Ganick), 2000
- Chac Prostibulario (with John M. Bennett), 2001
- Tri Loka, 2001
- Orientalia, 2003
- Inferno, 2005.
- Comedy, Divine, The, 2009
- The Death of Stalin: Selected Early Poems, 2010
- Ulterior Vision(s), 2011
- A Day in the Sun, 2012
- The Second Book, 2012
- Ars Poetica, 2013
- FIAT LUX, 2014
- Duo Poemata, 2015
- Orphic Cantos, 2016
- La Interrupcion conversacional, 2016
- Fragments from a gone world, 2017
- Lagarto de mi corazon, 2018
- Cien sonetos, 2019
- HOIL, 2019
- Twilight cantos, 2019
- The Rudiments of Poetry, 2020
- The Shape of air, Fragments, 2020
- The Last/lost epic, 2020
- Testamentum : two alphabets, 2020
- Diario di un ottogenario, 2020
- Secret poem, 2021
- Tamazunchale, 2021
- Field Hollers (with Solomon Rino), 2021
- The Blank Page, 2021
- Immobility—Poetry, 2022
- The Translation to Heaven, 2022
- Sintaxis ilegal, (selection and translation by Arturo Davila), 2022
- The Unfinished Breath (2 vols), 2023

== Blibliographical resources ==
https://faculty.ucmerced.edu/mmartin-rodriguez/index_files/vhArguellesIvan.htm
