= Jean-Frédéric Waldeck =

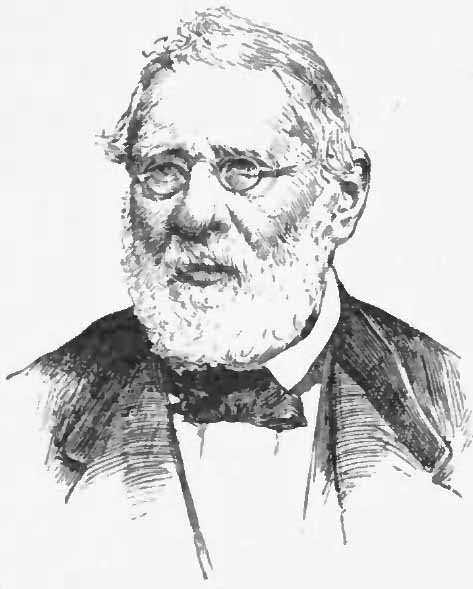
Jean-Frédéric Waldeck

Jean-Frédéric Maximilien de Waldeck (c. 1766 – c. 1875) was a French antiquarian, cartographer, artist and explorer. He was a man of talent and accomplishment, but his love of self-promotion and refusal to let the truth get in the way of a good story leave some aspects of his life in mystery.

At various times Waldeck said that he was born in Paris, Prague, or Vienna, and at other times claimed to be a German, Austrian or British citizen. He often claimed the title of count and occasionally that of duke or baron, but these cannot be verified.

Waldeck said he had traveled to southern Africa at age 19 and thereafter had begun a career in exploration. He claimed to have returned to France and studied art as a student of Jacques-Louis David. He said he had traveled to Egypt with Napoleon's expedition. None of this has been independently verified; indeed most of Waldeck's autobiography before about 1820 (including his given birthdate) is undocumented and his name is absent from records of various early expeditions he claimed to have been on.

Waldeck is remembered primarily for two actions. The first is publishing drawings based on the notorious set of erotic prints titled I Modi. The second is the exploration of Mexico and the publication of many examples of Maya and Aztec sculpture. Unfortunately, errors in his illustrations fostered misconceptions about Mesoamerican civilizations and contributed to Mayanism.

== I Modi ==
The I Modi drawings are highly pornographic and accompanied sonnets by Pietro Aretino. The original prints were published by the engraver Marcantonio Raimondi in the 16th century based on drawings by Giulio Romano. The publication caused a furor in Rome, and Pope Clement VII ordered that all copies be destroyed. As such, there is no known original printing of I Modi in existence. What has survived is a series of fragments in the British Museum, two copies of a single print, and a woodcut copy from the 16th century. Waldeck claimed to have found a set of tracings of the I Modi prints in a convent near Palenque in Mexico. His story is dubious because there is no such convent. However, we know that he saw the fragments now in the British Museum because the fragments can be matched to his drawings.

== Maya illustrations ==
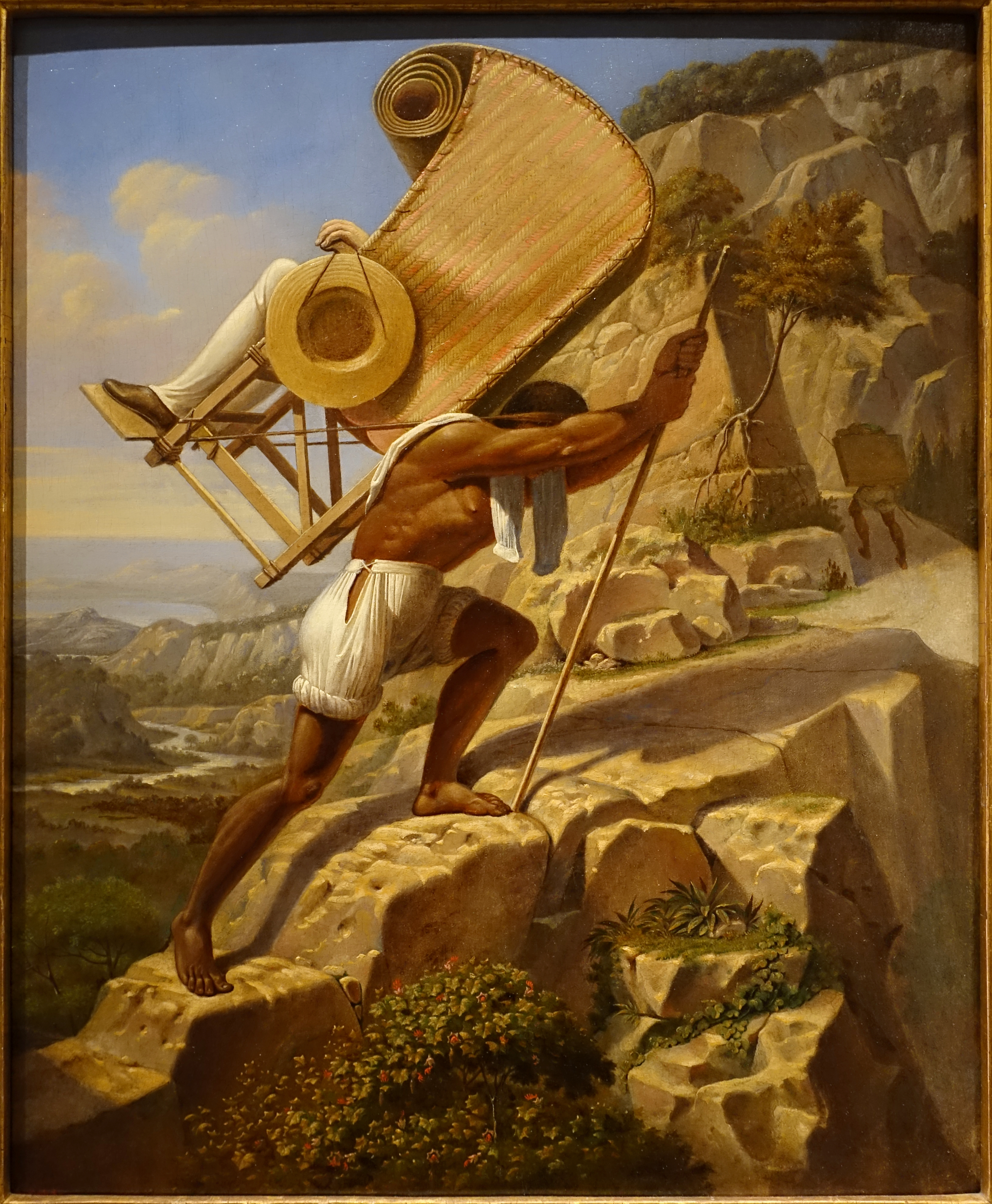
The artist carried by a sillero over the Chiapas from Palenque to Ocosingo, Mexico, by Jean-Frédéric Waldeck, c. 1833

Waldeck's first contact with the art of ancient Mesoamerica was when he was hired by the publisher Henry Berthoud to prepare some plates for an 1822 book entitled Description of the Ruins of an Ancient City. This book was an English translation of the 1787 report on Palenque by Antonio del Río which had been commissioned for Charles III of Spain and then sat unpublished in the National Archives of Spain. Waldeck's engravings were very different than the original drawings he worked from, and gave the monuments a decidedly Egyptian look, in line with his patron's views that the ancient Mesoamericans were the Lost Tribes of Israel.

In 1825, he was hired as a hydraulic engineer by an English mining company and went to Mexico. He did not last long at this job, and after his failure he explored the Pre-Columbian ruins of the country, living in the ruined Palenque between May 1832 and July 1833. After that, in 1834, he was hired by Lord Kingsborough to travel to Uxmal and make drawings and architectural reconstructions. Some of these were "fanciful in the extreme."

In 1838, Waldeck published Voyage pittoresque et archéologique dans la province d'Yucatan pendant les années 1834 et 1836 (Paris), a volume of illustrations of Mérida, Yucatán and Maya ruins, including those at Uxmal. Dedicated to Lord Kingsborough, this book provided what Waldeck believed was further support for connections between the ancient Maya and ancient Egypt. His illustration of the Pyramid of the Magician at Uxmal, for example, makes it look similar Egyptian pyramids. In 1839, he was elected a member of the American Antiquarian Society.

Waldeck's illustrations of Palenque were chosen to accompany Monuments anciens du Mexique (Palenque, et autres ruines de l'ancienne civilisation du Mexique) (1866) by Charles Étienne Brasseur de Bourbourg. However, just as his earlier illustrations had implied connections between the ancient Maya and ancient Egypt, the ones included with Brasseur de Bourbourg's text invoked the Classical antiquity of ancient Greece and Rome. His illustrations of panels of Maya script in the Temple of Inscriptions at Palenque included clear depictions of heads of elephants (now known to be erroneous embellishments). This fueled speculation about contact between the ancient Maya and Asia and the role of the mythical lost continent of Atlantis as a common link between ancient civilizations of the Old and New Worlds.

Waldeck published numerous lithographs of what he had come across. His last set of prints was published in 1866 when he celebrated his centennial.

== Death ==
Waldeck is alleged to have been active until his death, at the claimed age of 109 years 45 days. He supposedly died of a heart attack while eying a beautiful woman near the Champs-Élysées in Paris.

Waldeck has been described by historians as a "notorious fantasist" who stated he was 120 years old. It was alleged that he prolonged his life by consuming horseradish soaked in lemon juice. His birth and death date have not been verified.
