= Tony Shearer =

Tony Shearer (born Fred Anthony Shearer October 27, 1926, Colorado, d. May 2002) was an American Mayanism proponent and New Age author. His work contributed to the modern popularization of syncretic beliefs based on Maya calendrics and the purported significance of dates in August 1987 and December 2012.

Shearer withdrew from a promising career in conventional broadcast journalism in the 1960s in order to investigate the meaning of life, leading him to research and experience beliefs and practices of Mesoamericans, both ancient and modern.

== Publications ==
- Lord of the Dawn: Quetzalcoatl, the plumed serpent of Mexico, 1971
  - Lord of the Dawn : Quetzalcoatl and the tree of life, 1995 reprint
- The Story as Told, co-authored with Jalil Mahmoudi and Massood Mahmoudi, 1973
- Beneath the Moon and Under the Sun: A Poetic Reappraisal of the Sacred Calendar and the Prophecies of Ancient Mexico, 1975
- The Praying Flute: Song of the Earth Mother: A Bald Mountain Story, children's book published 1975, 1988, 1991, 2004
- The Sacred Calendar of Quetzalcoatl, 1976
- Spirit Song, 1981
- Boy and Tree and Poetic Myth, 1993
