= 2012: Time for Change =

- Directed by: João G. Amorim
- Release date: April 9, 2010
- Running time: 85 minutes
- Country: United States
- Language: English

2012: Time for Change is a 2010 feature-length documentary film directed by João G. Amorim. Based in part on the books of Daniel Pinchbeck, it premiered on April 9, 2010, at the Lumiere Theater in San Francisco. The film presents a positive alternative to apocalyptic doom and gloom, and features, among others, David Lynch, Sting, Elliot Page, Gilberto Gil, Barbara Marx Hubbard, Michael Dorsey and Paul Stamets.
