= Daniel Pinchbeck =

American author, journalist

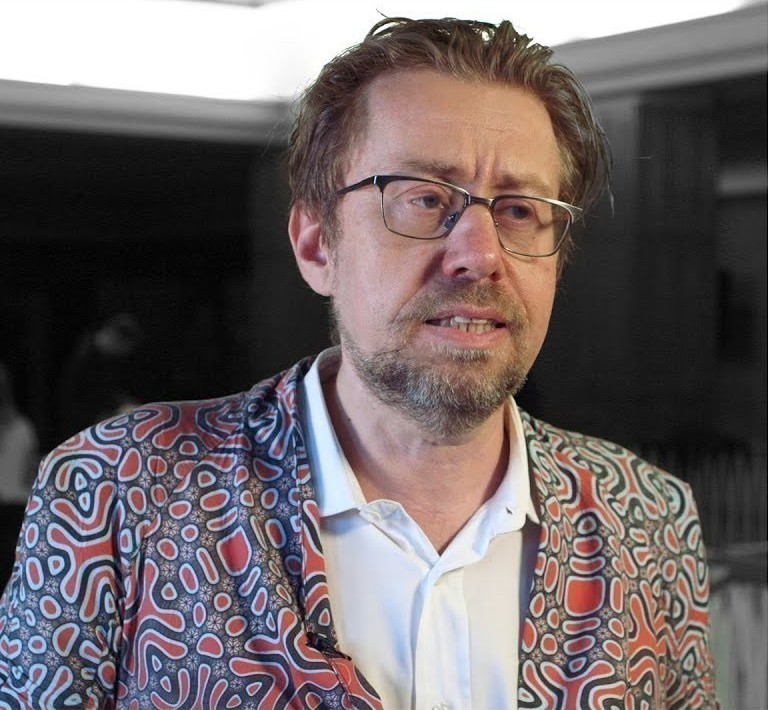
- Pinchbeck in 2018
- Born: June 15, 1966 (age 60)
- Occupations: Author, Journalist
- Relatives: Joyce Johnson (mother); Peter Pinchbeck (father)
- Writing career
- Subjects: Entheogens, Mayanism, New-age philosophy, ecology, technology
- Notable works: Breaking Open the Head: A Psychedelic Journey into the Heart of Contemporary Shamanism; 2012: The Return of Quetzalcoatl
- Website: www.pinchbeck.io

Daniel Pinchbeck (born June 15, 1966) is an American author and journalist. His books include Breaking Open the Head: A Psychedelic Journey into the Heart of Contemporary Shamanism, the New York Times best seller 2012: The Return of Quetzalcoatl, Notes from the Edge Times, How Soon is Now, and When Plants Dream. He has also written for the New York Times Magazine, The New York Times Book Review, Esquire, Harper's Bazaar, Rolling Stone, Art Forum, The Village Voice, and Esquire. He is a co-founder of the web magazine Reality Sandwich and of the website Evolver.net, and he edited the North Atlantic Books publishing imprint Evolver Editions. He was featured in the 2010 documentary 2012: Time for Change, directed by Joao Amorim and produced by Mangusta Films. He is the founder of the think tank Center for Planetary Culture, which produced the Regenerative Society Wiki.

== Family and background ==
Pinchbeck's father, Peter Pinchbeck, was an abstract painter, and his mother, writer and editor Joyce Johnson, was a member of the Beat Generation who dated Jack Kerouac as On the Road at the time was published in 1957 (chronicled in Johnson's book, Minor Characters).

Pinchbeck calls himself an "utterly nonreligious Jew."

== Works and activities ==
Pinchbeck was a founder of the 1990s literary magazine Open City with fellow writers Thomas Beller and Robert Bingham. He has written for many publications, including Esquire, The New York Times Magazine, The Village Voice, and Rolling Stone. In 1994 he was chosen by The New York Times Magazine as one of "Thirty Under Thirty" destined to change our culture through his work with Open City. He has been a regular columnist for a number of magazines, including Dazed & Confused.

In Breaking Open the Head, Pinchbeck explored shamanism via ceremonies with tribal groups such as the Bwiti of Gabon, who eat iboga, and the Secoya people in the Ecuadorean Amazon, who take the psychedelic tryptamine brew ayahuasca in their ceremonies. He also attended the Burning Man festival in Nevada, and looked at use of psychedelic substances in a de-sacralized modern context. Philosophically influenced by the work of anthroposophist Rudolf Steiner, through his direct experience and research Pinchbeck developed the hypothesis that shamanic and mystical views of reality have validity, and that the modern world had forfeited an understanding of intuitive aspects of being in its pursuit of rational materialism.

Drawing heavily, and somewhat controversially, from material shared on the Breaking Open the Head forums, Pinchbeck's second volume, 2012: The Return of Quetzalcoatl, chronicles Mayan and Hopi prophecies, and follows Pinchbeck's travels and travails as he responds to leads, both physical and intellectual, he receives via this forum. Examining the nature of prophecy during this period, Pinchbeck investigates the New Age hypothesis of Terence McKenna that humanity is experiencing an accelerated process of global consciousness transformation, leading to a new understanding of time and space. The book details the psi or extra-sensory perception research of Dean Radin, the theories of Terence McKenna, the phenomena of crop circles, and a visit to calendar reform advocate José Argüelles. Pinchbeck concludes with an account of receiving a transmission of prophetic material from the Mesoamerican deity Quetzalcoatl,. This claim was enough to get the book dropped by its planned publisher, delaying its release for the greater part of a year. While acknowledging that the validity of such an experience is unknown, Pinchbeck describes how a voice identifying itself as Quetzalcoatl began speaking to him during a 2004 trip to the Amazon. At the time, he was participating in the ceremonies of Santo Daime, a Brazilian religion that includes sacramental use of ayahuasca. Through its references to 2012 and the Maya calendar in the context of New Age beliefs, Pinchbeck's book has contributed to Mayanism.

In May 2007, Pinchbeck launched the website Reality Sandwich. He is the executive producer of Postmodern Times, a series of web videos presented on the iClips Network, and co-founder of Evolver.net, an online social network. His life and work are featured in the documentary 2012: Time for Change, featuring interviews with Sting, David Lynch, Barbara Marx Hubbard, and others.

In August 2013, Pinchbeck became the host of Mind Shift, a new talk show, filmed in New York City, produced by Gaiam TV.

Pinchbeck's How Soon Is Now? (2017) explores the idea that the ecological crisis is a rite of passage or initiation for humanity collectively, forcing us to reach the next level of our consciousness as a species. The book outlines the changes to our technical infrastructure - agriculture, energy, industry - and our social, political, and economic system that Pinchbeck believes necessary to avoid the worst consequences of global warming and species extinction.

== Appearances and interviews ==
In a 1973 article about the Wacky Packs parodies of consumer packaging, seven-year-old Pinchbeck told a reporter for New York Magazine, "I think they're bringing out the truth about foods."

On 14 December 2006, Pinchbeck appeared on the television program The Colbert Report to discuss his book, 2012: The Return of Quetzalcoatl.

Pinchbeck was featured in the 2006 video Entheogen: Awakening the Divine Within, a documentary about rediscovering an enchanted cosmos in the modern world.

Pinchbeck was also featured in the 2008 video 2012: Science or Superstition, a documentary describing how much of what we are hearing is science and how much is superstition.

He interviewed Alejandro Jodorowsky for the German/French art television network Arte (Durch die Nacht mit ...) in a very personal discussion, spending a night together in France, continuing the interview in different locations like in a park and in a hotel.

Pinchbeck appears in the documentary film 2012: Time for Change, directed by João G. Amorim, which was released in October 2010. He also appeared in the documentary film Electronic Awakening, directed by AC Johner, released in 2011.

Pinchbeck appeared on The Joe Rogan Experience podcast, recorded on 8 September 2011.

== Sexual misconduct admissions ==
In a Facebook post on October 22, 2017, Pinchbeck admitted to behavior he described as “sexually fixated, creepy, predatory.” In this post, he wrote that he had engaged in "pushing for sex without listening to why she was hesitant; seeking sexual contact with volunteers in an organization that I helped to start; the use of substances [drugs] as tools of seduction; being incredibly insensitive and tone-deaf to women’s wants and needs; making unwanted advances; focusing on much younger women."

== Books and publications ==
- Pinchbeck, Daniel (2002). Breaking Open the Head: A Psychedelic Journey into the Heart of Contemporary Shamanism (1st ed.). New York: Broadway Books. ISBN 978-0-767-90742-2.
- —— (2002). Jeff Koons Andy Warhol: Flowers. Essay by Daniel Pinchbeck. New York: Gagosian Gallery. ISBN 978-1-880-15485-4.
- —— (2006). 2012: The Return of Quetzalcoatl. New York: Jeremy P. Tarcher/Penguin. ISBN 978-1-585-42592-1.
- Pinchbeck, Daniel; Jordan, Ken, eds. (2009). Toward 2012: Perspectives on the Next Age. New York: Jeremy P. Tarcher/Penguin. ISBN 978-1-585-42700-0.
- —— (2010). Notes from the Edge Times. New York: Jeremy P. Tarcher/Penguin. ISBN 978-1-585-42837-3.
