= José Argüelles =

American writer and artist (1939–2011)

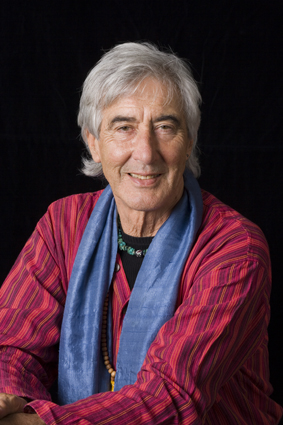
- Argüelles in 2009
- Born: Joseph Anthony Argüelles; January 24, 1939; Rochester, Minnesota, U.S.
- Died: March 23, 2011 (aged 72); Australia
- Occupations: Writer; artist
- Movement: New Age
- Relatives: Ivan Argüelles (twin brother); Laurita Ethel Kinsley (sister); Alexander Argüelles (nephew)

José Argüelles (/ɑːrˈɡweɪ.ɪs/; born Joseph Anthony Argüelles; January 24, 1939 – March 23, 2011) was an American New Age writer and artist. He was the co-founder, along with Lloydine Argüelles, of the Planet Art Network and the Foundation for the Law of Time. As one of the originators of the Earth Day concept, Argüelles founded the first Whole Earth Festival in 1970, at Davis, California.

He is best known for his leading role in organizing the 1987 Harmonic Convergence, for inventing (with the assistance of his wife Lloydine) the perpetual Dreamspell calendar in 1990, and for the central role that he played in the emergence of the 2012 phenomenon.

Towards the end of his life, Argüelles focused on issue of consciousness, elaborating the concept of a noosphere (based on the work of Teilhard de Chardin and Vladimir Vernadsky) as a global work of art. Specifically, he envisioned a "rainbow bridge" encircling the Earth.

== Early life and education ==
Argüelles' father, Enrique García Argüelles, was born in Guadalajara, Jalisco, Mexico to Sabino García Argüelles and María Gómez Márquez. His mother, Ethel Pearl Meyer, was born to Martin John Meyer and Laura Olga Hein in Potsdam, Minnesota. Joseph Anthony (Jose) Arguelles and his twin brother Ivan W. Arguelles were born in Rochester, Minnesota on January 24, 1939. José (born Joseph) was the twin brother of the poet Ivan Argüelles and the uncle of the linguist Alexander Argüelles.

He held a Ph.D. in Art History and Aesthetics from the University of Chicago and taught at numerous colleges, including Princeton University, the University of California, Davis, the San Francisco Art Institute, and Evergreen State College.

== Career ==
=== Artist ===
As a painter and visual artist, he provided illustrations for numerous books, as well as mural paintings at different universities. However, his scope as an artist included his education as an Art History Professor, and his views on art as a "psychophysical aesthetic" can be found in his doctoral dissertation Charles Henry and the Formation of a Psychophysical Aesthetic (Chicago University Press, 1972). When teaching as an untenured assistant professor at the University of California, Davis, one of his final exams to his students was to create "something they believed in" — this became a living art event which eventually became the basis for the annual Whole Earth Festival, still held today at the University of California, Davis.

After experimenting with LSD in the mid-1960s, Argüelles produced a series of psychedelic art paintings (Note: Argüelles 1972: The psychedelic mandala-like paintings of Jose Argüelles are reproduced on color plates in the back of the book.) that Humphrey Osmond—who originally coined the word "psychedelic"—named these "The Doors of Perception" (after Aldous Huxley's 1954 book of the same name, itself a title drawn from William Blake's early 19th-century work Milton a Poem). In a 2002 interview, Argüelles says of his artwork, "as fantastic as painting was, it was a limited medium in terms of audience."

Argüelles viewed his role as a visionary, saying "My job as a visionary is to envision the best possible outcome for humanity." He dedicated much of his life to promoting an alternative calendar based on a cycle of 13 months of 28 days each, which he believed would help bring about world peace. He and Lloydine coined the concept of "Time is Art" which became the slogan of the Planetary Art Network (PAN), suggesting that time is a vehicle for the human creative experience.

=== Spiritual leader ===
José Argüelles and his wife Lloydine were the principal organizers of the Harmonic Convergence event on August 16–17, 1987, said to have been the first globally synchronized meditation event. It focused on dates that had been identified by Tony Shearer in his book Lord of the Dawn (1971), a collection of poems in honor of the Aztec deity Quetzalcoatl (associated with the planet Venus) and describing major cycles of time. Argüelles' The Mayan Factor: Path Beyond Technology (1987), was published in conjunction with the Harmonic Convergence. In it, Argüelles described a numerological system combining elements taken from the pre-Columbian Maya calendar with the I Ching and elements of shamanism. These were interspersed with parallel concepts drawn from modern sciences such as "genetic codes" and "galactic convergences". The book popularized the concept of Hunab Ku, associating the Colonial Maya concept of "One God" with an Aztec design from a woven rug Argüelles had obtained in a marketplace in Oaxaca, Mexico.

Argüelles' modification of the Hunab Ku symbol.

Argüelles (who called himself Valum Votan), working together with his wife Lloydine (a.k.a. Bolon Ik), produced a calendar and divination system Dreamspell: The Journey of Timeship Earth 2013 and a game/tool Telektonon: The Talking Stone of Prophecy. The former, based on the Mesoamerican Long Count calendar with special emphasis on the 260-day tzolk'in count, was the source of the Argüelles' 13 Moon/28 Day Calendar. This calendar begins on July 26 (heliacal rising of the star Sirius) and runs for 364 days. The remaining date, July 25, is celebrated in some quarters as the "Day out of Time/Peace through Culture Festival".

Argüelles attributed the origins of the calendar to "Galactic Mayas," who he believed were ancient astronauts that had visited the ancient Mayas and taught them elements of civilization. One of their leaders was an individual he called Pacal Votan, known to Mayanists as K'inich Janaab' Pakal, who was buried in an elaborate tomb at the site of Palenque.

=== The Law of Time ===
In The Discovery of the Law of Time (1989-1996) José and Lloydine Argüelles devise and promote a notion that they call the "Law of Time", in part framed by their interpretation of how Maya calendrical mathematics functioned. In this notional framework, J. & L. Argüelles claim to have identified a "fundamental law" involving two timing frequencies: one they call "mechanised time" with a "12:60 frequency", and the other "natural [time] codified by the Maya [that is] understood to be the frequency 13:20". (Note: Terminology and statements in quotation marks taken from 2002 interview with Argüelles, as transcribed in Moynihan 2002, p.) To the Argüelles, "the irregular 12-month [Gregorian] calendar and artificial, mechanised 60-minute hour" is a construct that artificially regulates human affairs, and is out-of-step with the natural "synchronic order". José and Lloydine Argüelles propose the universal abandonment of the Gregorian calendar and its replacement with a thirteen moon, 28 day calendar, in order to "get the human race back on course" by the adoption of this calendar of perfect harmony so the human race could straighten its mind out again."

=== Planet Art Network ===
Argüelles co-founded the Planet Art Network (PAN) with Lloydine in 1983 as an autonomous, meta-political, worldwide peace organization engaging in art and spirituality. Active in over 90 countries, PAN identifies the Roerich Pact and has adopted its associated Banner of Peace as a symbol for "Peace Through Culture".

The Planet Art Network operates as a network of self-organized collectives, centralized by a shared focus of promoting the worldwide adoption of Argüelles' Dreamspell 13-Moon/28 day Calendar. The network upholds the slogan "Time is Art", suggesting that time is a vehicle for our creative experience, instead of the familiar saying "Time is Money".

The British anthropologist Will Black conducted research into Jose's Arguelles' Planet Art Network for several years. In his book Beyond the End of the World: 2012 and Apocalypse (2010), Black documents a general loss of interest in Dreamspell and in PAN in recent years. Black points out that, as general interest in the 2012 phenomenon increased as a result of the proximity of the supposed "end date," the significance of PAN and the value placed on Arguelles' ideas waned. Although Argüelles and his Dreamspell system were instrumental in encouraging people to consider the meaning of 2012, further investigation by individuals tended to provoke questioning of the Dreamspell.

=== First Noosphere World Forum ===
At the time of his death, he was the director of the Noosphere II project of the Galactic Research Institute of the Foundation for the Law of Time, inclusive of the First Noosphere World Forum, a project that involves creating a dialogue that unifies a network of organizations working to promote a positive shift of consciousness by 2012 with the vision of the whole Earth as a work of art.

== Influences ==
Argüelles' principal teacher and mentor was the unconventional Tibetan Buddhist and former monk Chögyam Trungpa, with whom he studied at Naropa University (then the Naropa Institute) in the mid-1970s. Argüelles' significant intellectual influences included Theosophy and the writings of Carl Jung and Mircea Eliade. Astrologer Dane Rudhyar was also one of Argüelles' most influential mentors.

Argüelles cited several Native American influences, among them Hopi elders Dan Katchongva and Thomas Banyacya and Lakota medicine man Arvol Looking Horse as well as part-Cheyenne author Frank Waters; part-Lakota, former Mormon, Beat Generation poet Tony Shearer; and Anishinaabe spiritual leader Vincent La Duke (a.k.a. Sun Bear).

New Age influences included Chuluaqui Quodoushka founder Harley Reagan, and Brooke "Medicine Eagle" Edwards.

Later in his life, Argüelles adopted the "Banner of Peace" from a design created by the Russian painter, explorer, and mystic Nicholas Roerich to accompany the adoption of the Roerich Pact for protecting cultural properties during wartime.

Two critics have pointed out that many of Dreamspell's influences come from non-Maya sources, such as the 13-month/28-day calendar, a magic square devised by Benjamin Franklin, the I Ching, numerology, and assorted mystical and pseudoarchaeological works such as Erich von Däniken's Chariots of the Gods? (1970), which emphasizes theories of ancient astronauts.

== Personal life ==
Argüelles married three times and was the father of two children, Josh and Tara, by his second wife, writer and artist Miriam Tarcov. He met and married his first wife, Elena Gustaitis, while pursuing his graduate degree at the University of Chicago in Art History. His third wife and main partner for 21 years was the dancer, choreographer and ceremonialist Lloydine Burris Argüelles (1981-2002).

After concluding his teaching career in California, Argüelles lived in Boulder, Colorado; Olympia, Washington; Hawaii; Australia; New Zealand; and Ashland, Oregon. In the year 1998, he met Stephanie South who became his biographer.

== Works ==
=== Books ===
- Argüelles, José (1972). Mandala. Shambhala Publications.
- Argüelles, José (1975). The Transformative Vision: Reflections on the Nature and History of Human Expression. Shambhala Publications.
- Argüelles, José (1984). Earth Ascending: An Illustrated Treatise on Law Governing Whole Systems. Shambhala Publications. ISBN 978-0877732631.
- Argüelles, José (1987). The Mayan Factor: Path Beyond Technology. United States: Inner Traditions/Bear & Company. ISBN 0-939680-38-6.
- Argüelles, José (1989). Surfers of the Zuvuya: Tales of Interdimensional Travel. Inner Traditions/Bear & Company. ISBN 0-939680-55-6.
- Argüelles, José; Arguelles, Miriam (1995). Mandala. Chogyam Trungpa (Foreword). Shambhala. ISBN 1-57062-120-9.
- Argüelles, José (1996). The Arcturus Probe: Tales and Reports of an Ongoing Investigation. Light Technology Publishing. ISBN 0-929385-75-6.
- Argüelles, José (1996). The Call of Pacal Votan: Time is the Fourth Dimension. Altea Publishing. ISBN 0-9524555-6-0.
- Argüelles, Jose (2002). Time and the Technosphere: The Law of Time in Human Affairs. Inner Traditions/Bear & Company. ISBN 1-879181-99-1.
- Argüelles, Jose (2011). Manifesto for the Noosphere: The Next Stage in the Evolution of Human Consciousness. North Atlantic Books. ISBN 978-1-58394-303-8.

=== Articles and anthologies ===
- Argüelles, Jose (1995). Galactic Human Handbook: Entering the New Time - Creating Planetary Groups, Part 2. Altea Publications. ISBN 0-9524555-5-2. (Part 1 was written by Sheldan Nidle, and a printing error resulted in some missing and duplicated pages in Part 1 of some early editions.)
- Argüelles, José; Argüelles, Lloydine (December 2017) [1997]. The Discovery of the Law of Time (PDF). Planet Art Network.

=== Calendar ===
- Argüelles, José; Argüelles, Lloydine (1990). Dreamspell: The Journey of Timeship Earth 2013. Hong Kong: Chelsea Pacific.

== See also ==
- List of peace activists
