= Harley Reagan =

American pretendian and New Age figure

Harley "Swiftdeer" Reagan (1941–2013) was an American pretendian and New Age spiritual leader. He is known for founding the Deer Tribe Metis Medicine Society and for developing Chulukua, a martial art, and Chuluaqui Quodoushka, a collection of sexual techniques and theories.

== Biography ==
Reagan was born in Texas, to an allegedly Cherokee parent and a white parent.

== Chuluaqui Quodoushka ==
According to Reagan and his followers, the "Quodoushka teachings" (also known as "the "Q" to adherents), guided exercises, and rituals allow a person to improve relationships and reach "higher levels" of orgasm and sexual ecstasy. Demonstrations at Chuluaqui Quodoushka retreats include male and female self-pleasuring techniques, close-up examinations to show variations in the shapes of genitalia, and participants having sexual intercourse while Reagan and other trainers watch and "coach" them.

=== Criticism ===
The sexual rites of passage Reagan said are drawn from spiritual practices of the Olmec, Mayan and Toltec cultures, and what he claimed are secret societies within the Cherokee Nation, have been denounced as fraudulent by the traditional teachers of these cultures. Many cultures contain rites of passage—usually social and spiritual ceremonies held as a child enters adulthood. Reagan claimed to take inspiration from these ceremonies. But his critics agree that his claims about these ceremonies starkly contrast with the teachings and beliefs of the cultures he claims to represent. The Cherokee Nation disavows Reagan's claims entirely, noting that Reagan was not an enrolled member of the Cherokee Nation or a member of any Cherokee community. After being denounced by the Cherokee Nation, Reagan abruptly changed his story and claimed the teachings are inspired by a variety of cultures.

=== Language ===
In the workshops a woman's genitalia are called "tupuli", which Reagan claimed is a Cherokee term for "sacred black hole of creation", and a man's genitalia are called "tipilli", which Reagan said is a Cherokee term meaning "like a tipi pole". According to Durbin Feeling, a linguistic specialist for the Cherokee Nation, there are no such words in the Cherokee language, and Cherokee do not and never have lived in tipis. In fact, the word "tipili" applied to genitals is likely taken from Gary Jennings's novel Aztec. Feeling said Chu-Lua-Qui refers to Cherokee people; he said the closest translation he could find for Quodoushka is "(a)qwv-tol u- ska", a graphic term for a male sexual organ that has nothing to do with Cherokee spirituality. "It's pretty ugly. I don't know if [Reagan] realizes what it means." Feeling added, "He probably does know what it means."

=== Credentials ===
There is no evidence that Chuluaqui Quodoushka is based on ancient traditions. Much of the ancient Maya religious tradition is still not understood by scholars and there is no surviving information about Mayan sex rituals. The Olmecs were a people in Mexico who predated the Aztecs. Their culture disappeared and the only clues left about them are some stone statues and hieroglyphic carvings. Olmec mythology has left no documents and therefore cannot have anything to do with modern-day sex rituals. Reagan also claimed without evidence that the teachings are also Toltec in origin.

The Cherokee Nation firmly denies any involvement in the Chuluaqui-Quodoushka. Reagan appeared on the HBO program "Real Sex in America" in 1992, promoting Quodoushka as a Cherokee ritual. The chief of the Cherokee Nation of Oklahoma at the time, Wilma Mankiller, threatened to sue HBO for misrepresentation, and the Cherokee passed a resolution condemning Reagan and other "plastic shamans". Some believe that in order to avoid a lawsuit, Reagan changed his story to the claim that Quodoushka is a blend of many ancient sexual traditions.

Richard Allen, a research and policy analyst of the Cherokee Nation, said of the Chuluaqui Quodoushka, "Reagan's made it up. We learn about sex like everyone else does, behind the barn."

=== Proponents ===
One of the fans of the "Q" is pornographic film actor Porsche Lynn, who studied with Reagan and has praised the "Q" workshops.

=== In film ===
The movie Quodoushka, Native American Love Techniques (or Quodoushka) came out in 1991, distributed by Vivid Video and starring such porn actors as Ashley Nicole, Heather Hart, Hyapatia Lee, and Madison. Lee was a student of Reagan's and claims to be of Cherokee descent. The film is a pornographic film made to look like a documentary. It depicts various women of supposedly Cherokee ancestry copulating in various ways, mostly with white men.

== Chulukua ==
Reagan also created and taught "Chulukua-ryu", a martial art he claimed combined Japanese and Native American fighting techniques "into an unbeatable system".
