= Michel Meslin =

French academic

Michel Meslin (29 September 1926 in Paris – 12 April 2010 in Paris) was a professor at and president of the Université de Paris-Sorbonne (Paris IV). He established the Institut de Recherche pour l'Etude des Religions (IRER). A specialist in late antiquity, the history of Christianity and anthropology of religion, he published several works on these and other subjects.

== Published works ==
- Les Ariens d'Occident (1967)
- Le Christianisme dans l'empire romain (1970)
- Pour une science des Religions, Le Seuil, (1973)
- L'Homme Romain (1978)
- Histoire de l'Eglise par elle-même Fayard, 1978, avec Jacques Loew.
- L'Expérience humaine du divin Paris, Le Cerf, 1988.
- Les Religions, la médecine, et l'origine de la vie Odile Jacob, 2001, avec Ysé Tardan-Masquelier et Alain Proust.
- Quand les Hommes parlent aux dieux, histoire de la prière dans les civilisations Bayard, 2003
- La Quête de guérison, Médecine et religions face à la souffrance Bayard, 2006 avec Ysé Tardan-Masquelier.
- Des mythes fondateurs pour notre humanité Complexe, 2007
- L'Homme et le religieux Honoré Champion, 2010
