= Votan =

Maya God

Votan is a legendary or mythological figure mentioned in early European accounts of the Maya civilization.

== Origins of the Votan story ==
The story of Votan in Mexico dates back to at least the late 17th century. It was first published in Constituciones diocesanas del obispado de Chiappa (1702) by Francisco Núñez de la Vega, Bishop of Chiapas. According to Francisco Javier Clavijero:

F. Núñez de la Vega, bishop of Chiapa, says, in the preface to his Synodal Constitutions, that in the visit which he made to his diocese towards the end of the last century [i.e. the late 1600s], he found many ancient calendars of the Chiapanese, and an old manuscript in the language of that country, made by the Indians themselves, in which it was said, according to their ancient tradition, that a certain person named Votan was present at that great building, which was made by order of his uncle, in order to mount up to heaven; that then every people was given its language, and that Votan himself was charged by God to make the division of the lands of Anahuac. The prelate adds afterwards, that there was in his time in Teopixca a great settlement of that diocese, a family of the surname of Votan, who were the reputed descendants of that ancient populator. We are not here endeavoring to give the antiquity to the populator of America on the faith of the Chiapanese, but merely to shew that the Americans conceived themselves the descendants of Noah.

In his account, Bishop Núñez de Vega also states that Votan belonged to the royal lineage of "Cham" (probably "chan" or snake) and that he established a kingdom called "Na Chan" (Snake House) on the Usumacinta River that eventually extended across Chiapas and Soconusco to the Pacific Coast. Additional information can be found in a 1786 publication by Antonio del Río that cites the same sources as Clavijero and speculates at length on Votan's identity and travels to the Old World.

At a time when the origins of pre-Columbian cultures were poorly understood, these clerics associated Votan with the Biblical stories of the Tower of Babel and Noah, speculating that he had come to Mexico from the Old World. This tradition has been perpetuated by additional fantastic speculations that have been sharply critiqued by subsequent scholarship. This includes the association of Votan with Palenque by Ramon de Ordoñez y Aguilar, a priest who had lived near the site and wrote one of the earliest descriptions of the ruins in 1773. Ordoñez apparently incorporated some of the information that had been collected earlier by Bishop Núñez de la Vega into a document called the Probanza de Votan. "This strange work contained some fragments from Ximénez and a confused account of Votan, culture hero of the Tzeltal people, who, according to Ordoñez, had built Palenque. Fantastic details described Votan's four trips back to the Middle East." The Tzeltal are an ethnic group that occupies the region that includes Teopisca, Chiapas, about 113 km southeast of Palenque. In the late 17th century, two hundred Tzeltal families "of Votan's ancestry" are said to have been living in Comitlan.

Assertion of a relationship between Votan and Odin is found in the work of the distinguished geographer Alexander von Humboldt, who wrote in Vues des Cordillères (1810):

We have fixed the special attention of our readers upon this Votan, or Wodan, an American who appears in the same family with the Wods or Odins of the Goths and of the people of Celtic origins. Since, according to the learned researches of Sir William Jones, Odin and Buddha are probably the same person, it is curious to see the names of Bondvar, Wodansdag, and Votan designating in India, Scandinavia, and in Mexico the day of a brief period.

In Histoire des nations civilisées du Mexique et de l'Amérique Centrale (1857), Charles Étienne Brasseur de Bourbourg claimed Votan was an ancient Phoenician legislateur who had migrated from the Middle East to the Maya area, defeated a race called the Quiname, built the city of Palenque, and established an empire called Xibalba that was postulated by Brasseur de Bourbourg to have once covered all of Mexico and part of the United States. Subsequent Mayanist scholarship has found little support for Phoenician contact with ancient Mesoamerica, and identifies Xibalba as a mythical place rather than a political entity.

== Influence on Mormonism ==
Extensive analysis of the story of Votan appeared as commentary on the work of Antonio del Río by Paul Felix Cabrera in 1822. Critics of the LDS church have claimed that Cabrera's work had a strong influence on Joseph Smith and Oliver Cowdery, founders of the Latter Day Saint movement. Smith reported having a vision in 1823 that eventually led him to the claimed discovery of golden plates that documented a group of ancient Israelites journey to the Americas, 960 years of their descendants history and their dealings with the god of the Israelites. These plates are the origin of the Book of Mormon.

== Similarity to Wotan ==
The similarity between the names Votan and Wotan has also been the source of much confusion. Chapter IV of Atlantis: The Antediluvian World (1882) by Ignatius L. Donnelly, titled "The God Odin, Woden, or Wotan", repeats Clavijero's reference in the context of speculation about Atlantis and (following Brasseur de Bourbourg) also suggests that Votan built Palenque. Donnelly quotes Clavijero as saying that Votan "conducted seven families from Valum-Votan to this continent, and assigned lands to them", and implies that "Valum-Votan" may have been a reference to Atlantis. The story of Votan was further associated with the Atlantis legend by Lewis Spence in Atlantis in America (1925), who identifies Votan as "a local name for Quetzalcoatl" and provides a synopsis of the account by Núñez de la Vega.

== Pacal Votan ==
Associations of Votan with Palenque have led New Age spiritual leader José Argüelles to identify Pacal the Great as "Pacal Votan" and to identify himself as an emanation of "Valum Votan". However, no mention of Votan has been found in the inscriptions of Palenque despite considerable progress in the decipherment of the extensive Maya inscriptions known for the site.

== Culture hero? ==
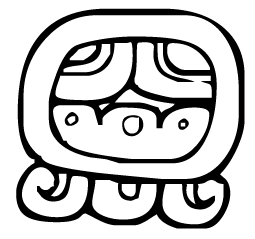
A glyph for the third day (Ak'b'al) in the Maya tzolk'in calendar, which among the Tzeltal and some other highland Chiapas groups was known/identified as votan

A more critical evaluation suggests that Votan was a culture hero of the Tzeltal whose story may be based on that of a ruler who lived in the vicinity of Teopisca, Chiapas during the Postclassic period. He was referred to as "Lord of the Horizontal Wooden Drum" and "jaguar god of darkness" (ak'bal), and his name was one of twenty day names in the Tzeltal calendar. Ritual objects associated with Votan were removed from a sanctuary and burned in the main square of Huehuetlán by Bishop Núñez de la Vega in 1691.

== Votan Zapata ==
Votan is often described as the "heart" of indigenous people in Chiapas. The qualities of both culture hero and deep sentiment are expressed in the persona of Votan Zapata, a legendary manifestation of the spirit of Emiliano Zapata honored by members of the Zapatista Army of National Liberation (EZLN).
