= Breaking Open the Head =

Book by Daniel Pinchbeck

- Author: Daniel Pinchbeck
- Language: English
- Subject: Psychedelics, Shamanism
- Publisher: Broadway Books
- Publication date: 2002
- Publication place: United States
- Pages: 336 pp
- ISBN: 978-0-7679-0742-2

Breaking Open the Head: A Psychedelic Journey into the Heart of Contemporary Shamanism is a 2002 book written by American writer Daniel Pinchbeck, founding editor of the literary journal Open City.

== Contents ==
Published in 2002, Breaking Open the Head covers, in Pinchbeck's words, the cultural history of psychedelic use, philosophical and critical perspectives on shamanism, and his personal transformation from a cynical New York litterateur to psychedelic acolyte.

Pinchbeck details his initiation with the Bwiti and their use of iboga. The account remains personal with Pinchbeck crediting the experience with an insight into his reliance on alcohol.

Later in the book, Pinchbeck describes his experiences with the psychedelic dipropyltryptamine (DPT).

== Editions ==
- Pinchbeck, Daniel (2002). Breaking Open the Head: A Psychedelic Journey into the Heart of Contemporary Shamanism. Broadway Books. ISBN 0-7679-0742-6.

== See also ==
- List of psychedelic literature
