= John Major Jenkins =

New Age writer

John Major Jenkins (4 March 1964 – 2 July 2017) was an American author and pseudoscientific researcher. He is best known for his works that theorize certain astronomical and esoteric connections of the calendar systems used by the Maya civilization of pre-Columbian Mesoamerica. His writings are particularly associated with 2012 millenarianism and the development of Mayanism in contemporary and popular culture, as an outgrowth from the New Age milieu. He is one of the principal figures who have promoted the idea that the ancient Maya calendar ends on 21 December 2012 and that this portended major changes for the Earth. He has self-published a number of books through his Four Ahau Press.

He died on 2 July 2017 from cancer of the kidney at the age of 53.

== Alternative view of cosmology ==
Jenkins considered scientific approaches to cosmology a byproduct of limited thinking. In Tzolkin: Visionary Perspectives and Calendar Studies, he writes, "I primarily wish to promote a visionary approach to these matters, as there is much more to the Sacred Calendar than can be seen with the rational intellect," and that these visionary perspectives "can more closely touch the spirit of the calendar" than does the anthropological literature.

Jenkins also maintained that, in order to accept and understand his cosmological theories, one must also accept the premise that the Mayan kings journeyed to “distant places,” and continuously “renewed” their kingdoms at specific points in the Maya calendar. Jenkins is also a supporter of “The Lost Star” theory which extrapolates the existence of a binary companion of the Earth’s sun based on a believed mathematical discrepancies in “earth wobble.”

== Appearances ==
In October of the year 2000, Jenkins work was featured on two episodes of Places of Mystery series on the Discovery Channel.

Jenkins was interviewed and appears in the film Manifesting the Mind a film by Andrew Rutajit.

Jenkins is featured speaking in the documentary 2012: Science or Superstition. The film explores the interpretations of the ancient Mayan predictions by researchers and scholars.

Jenkins is also featured in the documentary/film 2012: Startling New Secrets.

== Publications ==
- Journey to the Mayan Underworld (Four Ahau Press, Boulder, CO: 1989)
- Mirror in the Sky (Four Ahau Press, 1991)
- Tzolkin: Visionary Perspectives and Calendar Studies (Borderland Sciences Research Foundation, Garberville, CA: 1992/1994)
- Mayan Sacred Science (Four Ahau Press, Boulder, CO: 1994)
- Maya Cosmogenesis 2012 (Bear & Company, Santa Fe, NM: 1998)
- Galactic Alignment: The Transformation of Consciousness According to Mayan, Egyptian, and Vedic Traditions (Inner Traditions International (Rochester, VT) 2002)
- Pyramid of Fire, co-authored with Marty Matz, Bear & Company, 2004
- The 2012 Story: The Myths, Fallacies, and Truth Behind the Most Intriguing Date in History (Tarcher/Penguin 2009)
- Three Plumes of Judas (fiction) self-published, 2017
