= Harmonic Convergence =

World's first synchronized global peace meditation, observed August 1987

The Harmonic Convergence was the world's first synchronized global peace meditation, coinciding with an exceptional alignment of Solar System planets on August 16–17, 1987. The event was organized by spouses José Argüelles and Lloydine Burris Argüelles, via the Planet Art Network (PAN), a peace movement they founded in 1983. Timing of the Harmonic Convergence allegedly marked a significant celestial alignment of the Sun, Moon, and six planets as "part of the grand trine."

== Origins ==
Though Arguelles eventually connected the timing of the Harmonic Convergence with his understanding of the significance of Maya calendrics, the dates themselves were derived not from Maya cosmology but from the reconstructed Aztec prophecies of Tony Shearer in his 1971 book Lord of the Dawn. Shearer introduced the dates and the prophecy to Arguelles, who eventually co-opted them and coined the term "Harmonic Convergence" to promote the event.

According to Shearer's interpretation of the Aztec calendar, the selected date marked the end of twenty-two cycles of 52 years each, or 1,144 years in all. The twenty-two cycles were divided into thirteen "heaven" cycles, which began in AD 843 and ended in 1519, when the nine "hell" cycles began, ending 468 years later in 1987. The very beginning of the nine "hell" cycles was precisely the day that Hernán Cortés landed in Mexico, April 22, 1519 (coinciding with "1 Reed" on the Aztec/Mayan calendar, the day sacred to Mesoamerican cultural hero Quetzalcoatl). The 9 hell cycles of 52 years each, ended precisely on August 16–17, 1987.

== Astrological alignment ==
According to the astrologer Neil Michelsen's "The American Ephemeris," on 24 August 1987 there was an exceptional alignment of planets in the Solar System. Eight primary celestial bodies were aligned in an unusual configuration called a grand trine.

The Sun, Moon and six out of nine planets (note: Astrology continues to consider Pluto as a “planet.”) formed part of the grand trine, that is, they were aligned at the apexes of an equilateral triangle when viewed from the Earth.

The Sun, Moon, Mars, and Venus were in exact alignment, astrologically called a conjunction at the first degree of Virgo in Tropical Astrology. Mercury was in the fourth degree of Virgo which most astrologers count as part of the same conjunction being within the "orb" of influence. Jupiter was in Aries, and Saturn and Uranus in Sagittarius completing the grand trine. However some believe that this is an Earth grand trine with Sun/Moon/Mars/Venus/Mercury in the initial degrees of Virgo, Neptune at 5 degrees of Capricorn, and Jupiter in the last degree of Aries (anaretic degree), on the cusp of Taurus. Uranus, and especially Saturn are on the edge of this trine.

There is disagreement regarding this occurrence being a unique event. Grand trines, where planets share 120 degree positions forming an equilateral triangle, are not uncommon or particularly noteworthy. Traditional astrology does not consider trines to be action points, and would not regard such an occurrence to be significant.

== Astrological interpretations ==
The convergence is purported to have "corresponded with a great shift in the earth’s energy from warlike to peaceful." Believers of this esoteric prophecy maintain that the Harmonic Convergence ushered in a five-year period of Earth's "cleansing", where many of the planet's "false structures of separation" would collapse.

Adherents deemed the event as beginning a new age of universal peace, with signs indicating a "major energy shift" was about to occur, a turning point in Earth's collective karma and dharma, and that this energy was powerful enough to change the global perspective of man from one of conflict to one of co-operation. Actress and author Shirley MacLaine called it a "window of light," allowing access to higher realms of awareness.

According to Argüelles, the Harmonic Convergence also began the final 25-year countdown to the end of the Mayan Long Count in 2012, which would be the so-called end of history and the beginning of a new 5,125-year cycle. Evils of the modern world (war, materialism, violence, abuses, injustice, oppression, etc.) would have ended with the birth of the 6th Sun and the 5th Earth on December 21, 2012.

== Power centers ==
An important part of the Harmonic Convergence observances was the idea of congregating at "power centers." Power centers were places, such as Mount Shasta, California, Mount Fuji, Mount Yamnuska, and Grasshopper Hill Farm, Maine where the spiritual energy was held to be particularly strong. The belief was that if 144,000 people assembled at these power centers and meditated for peace, that the arrival of the new era would be facilitated.

== See also ==
- Big Generator, 1987 album by the band Yes including the song "Holy Lamb (Song for Harmonic Convergence)"
- Harmonic Convergence (The Legend of Korra)
- Planetary alignment
- World Contact Day
