= Wolf Creek =

Wolf Creek may refer to:

== Bodies of water ==
=== Missouri ===
- Wolf Creek (Beaver Creek tributary)
- Wolf Creek (Cane Creek tributary)
- Wolf Creek (Cave Creek tributary)
- Wolf Creek (Elkhorn Creek tributary)
- Wolf Creek (Nodaway River tributary)
- Wolf Creek (South Grand River tributary)
- Wolf Creek (St. Francis River tributary)
- Wolf Creek (Taney County, Missouri)
- Wolf Creek (Thompson River tributary)
- Wolf Creek (Tuque Creek tributary)

=== Montana ===
- Wolf Creek (Lewis and Clark County, Montana), a tributary of the Missouri River
- Wolf Creek (McCone County, Montana), a tributary of the Redwater River in McCone County
- Wolf Creek (Roosevelt County, Montana), a tributary of the Missouri River in Roosevelt County

=== Ohio ===
- Wolf Creek (Great Miami River tributary), a tributary of the Great Miami River
- Wolf Creek (Muskingum River tributary), a tributary of the Muskingum River
- Wolf Creek (Sandusky River)

=== Other states ===
- Wolf Creek (Nevada County, California), a tributary of the Bear River
- Wolf Creek (Mineral County, Colorado), a tributary of the West Fork San Juan River
- Wolf Creek (Rocky Creek tributary), a stream in Georgia
- Wolf Creek (Iowa), a tributary of the Cedar River in Grundy and Black Hawk Counties
- Wolf Creek (Minnesota), a tributary of the Cedar River in Mower County
- Wolf Creek (southern Minnesota), a tributary of the Cannon River in Rice County
- Wolf Creek (New York), a tributary of Genesee River
- Wolf Creek (Oklahoma), a tributary of the North Canadian River in Oklahoma and Texas
- Wolf Creek (Northkill Creek), a tributary of Northkill Creek in Berks County, Pennsylvania
- Wolf Creek (Slippery Rock Creek tributary), west Pennsylvania
- Wolf Creek (Beech River tributary), Tennessee
- Wolf Creek (Duck River), in Hickman County, Tennessee
- Wolf Creek (New River tributary), in Virginia
- Wolf Creek (Virginia), a tributary of the North Fork of the Holston River in Virginia
- Wolf Creek (Greenbrier River), a stream in West Virginia

=== Canada ===
- Wolf Creek (Timiskaming District), a stream in Ontario
- Wolf Creek Research Basin, Yukon River Basin, northwestern Canada

== Populated places ==
- Wolf Creek, Illinois, an unincorporated community
- Wolf Creek, Louisville, Jefferson County, Kentucky
- Wolf Creek, Montana, an unincorporated community
- Wolf Creek, Ohio, an unincorporated community
- Wolf Creek, Oregon, a town
- Wolf Creek, South Dakota, a community in Pine Ridge, South Dakota
- Wolf Creek, Utah
- Wolf Creek, Wisconsin, an unincorporated community
- Wolfcreek, West Virginia, an unincorporated community

== Film and television ==
- Wolf Creek (film), a 2005 independent Australian horror film
- Wolf Creek 2, a 2013 sequel Australian horror film
- Wolf Creek (TV series), a 2016 Australian television series

== Other uses ==
- Wolf Creek Dam, on the Cumberland River in Kentucky
- Wolf Creek Nuclear Generating Station near Burlington, Kansas
- Wolf Creek Pass, a mountain pass in Colorado
- Wolf Creek State Park in Illinois
- Wolf Creek ski area in Colorado
- Wolf Creek Reservoir, within the Elkhorn Mountains, Oregon
- Wolf Mountain, Wolf Creek Utah Ski Resort

== See also ==
- Wolfe Creek, Western Australia
