= Cave (disambiguation) =

A cave is a subterranean chamber.

Cave or Caves may also refer to:

== People ==
- Cave (name)
- Cave baronets, two baronetcies

== Places ==
- Cave, Lazio, Italy
- Cave, Missouri, United States
- Cave, New Zealand
- Cave, West Virginia, United States
- Cave City (disambiguation)
- Cave Cove, a cove in South Georgia
- Cave Creek (disambiguation)
- Cave Hill (disambiguation)
- Cave Junction, Oregon
- Cave Nebula, in outer space
- Cave Spring (disambiguation)
- Cave Township, Franklin County, Illinois
- Caves, Aude, France
- The Caves, Queensland, Australia

== Technology ==
- Cave (company), a Japanese video game company
- Cave automatic virtual environment, a projection-based immersive virtual reality system
- CAVE-based authentication, used to secure some mobile phone systems
- Cave, an alternate name for the text-based computer game Colossal Cave Adventure

== Entertainment ==
- "C*A*V*E", a season 7 episode of the television show M*A*S*H
- Cave (band), a psych-drone band from Chicago
- Caves (band), an English melodic punk band
- Caves (album), a 2023 album by Needtobreathe
- "Cave" (Muse song), 1999
- "Caves" (Star Trek: Lower Decks), a 2023 television episode
- "Cave" (Dom Dolla and Tove Lo song), 2024

== Other ==
- Caves (beer), a dark Belgian beer
- CAVE people, citizens against virtually everything
- Cave Research Foundation, an American non-profit group dedicated to the preservation of caves, and its affiliate, Cave Books
- Commission for the Promotion of Virtue and Prevention of Vice, sometimes abbreviated CAVES

== See also ==
- Allegory of the cave, by Plato
- The Cave (disambiguation)
