= Bages, Aude =

Commune in Occitanie, France

Bages
- Commune
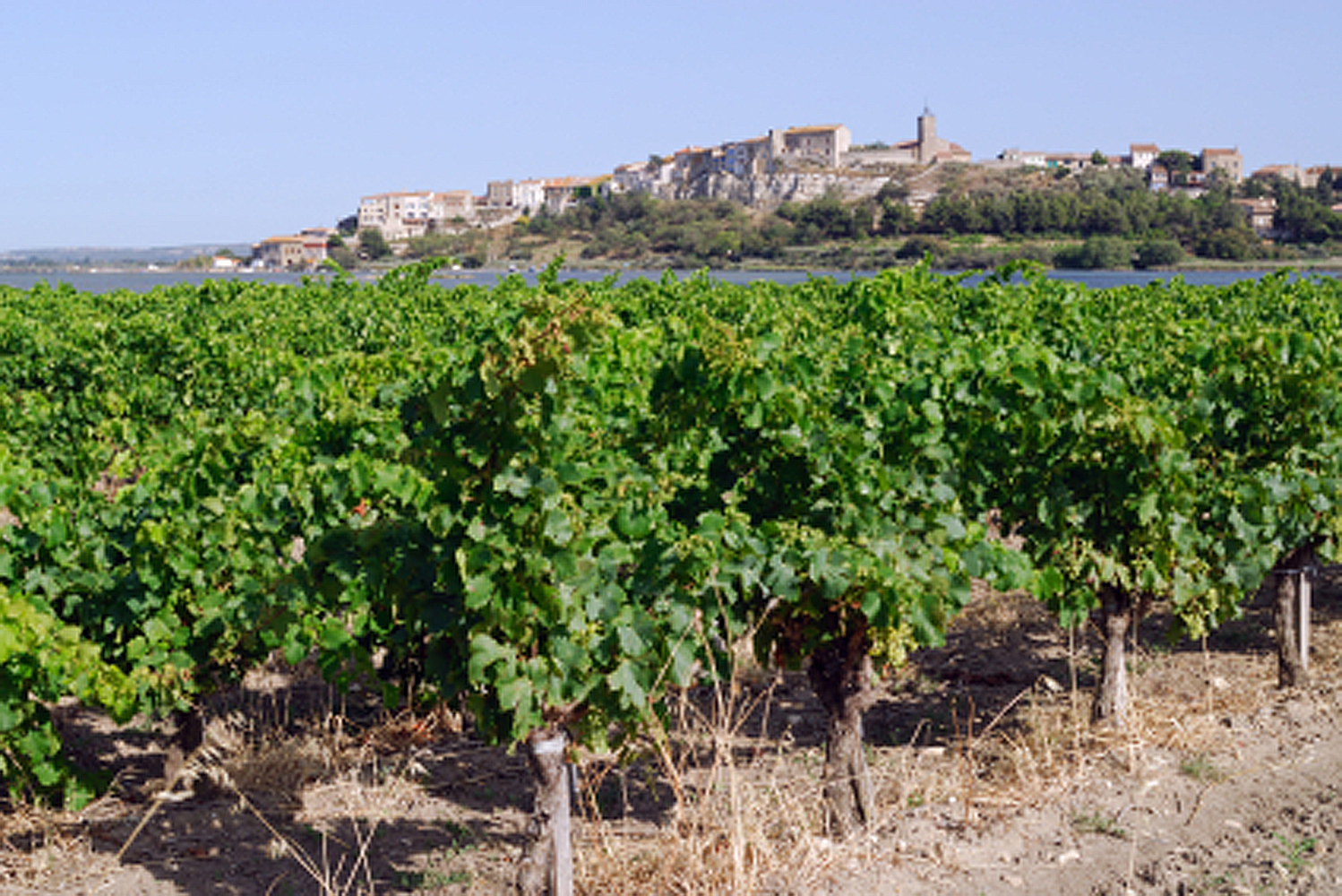
- A general view of Bages, seen from a vineyard

- Coat of arms
- Location of Bages
- Location within France Location within Occitanie
- Coordinates: 43°07′27″N 2°59′30″E
- Country: France
- Region: Occitania
- Department: Aude
- Arrondissement: Narbonne
- Canton: Narbonne-2
- Intercommunality: Grand Narbonne

Government
  - Mayor (2020–2026): Jean-Louis Rio
- Area^{1}: 12.53 km^{2} (4.84 sq mi)
- Elevation: 36 m (118 ft)
- Highest elevation: 190 m (620 ft)
- Lowest elevation: 0 m (0 ft)
- Population (2023): 720
  - Density: 57/km^{2} (150/sq mi)
- Time zone: UTC+01:00 (CET)
  - Summer (DST): UTC+02:00 (CEST)
- INSEE/Postal code: 11024 /11100
- ^{1} French Land Register data, which excludes lakes, ponds, glaciers > 1 km^{2} (0.386 sq mi or 247 acres) and river estuaries.

Bages (French pronunciation: [baʒ]; Occitan: Bajas) is a commune in the Aude department in the Occitanie region of southern France.

== Geography ==
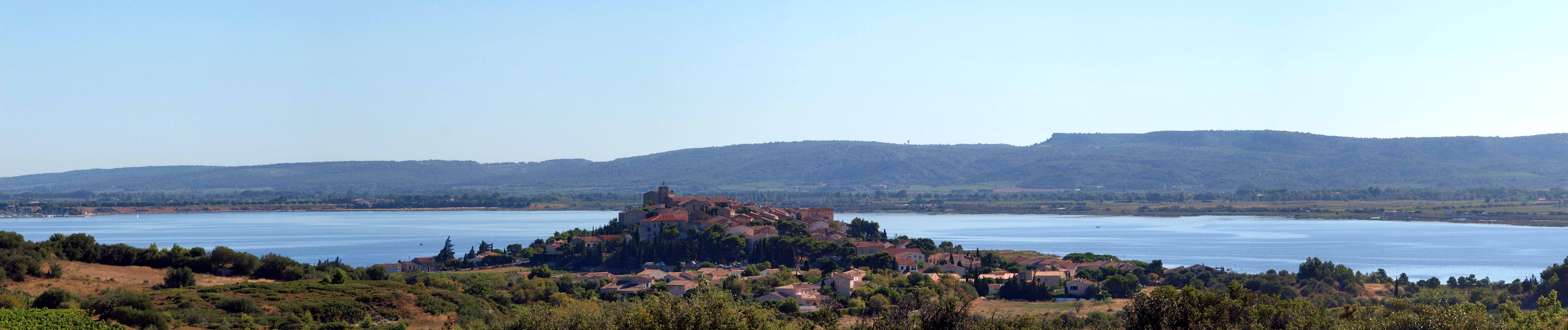
Panorama of Bages

Bages is located in the urban area of Narbonne on the Canal de la Robine and the Étang de Bages-Sigean (Bages-Sigean Lake) some 6 km south-west of Narbonne and 9 km north of Portel-des-Corbières. Access to the commune is by the D6009 road from Narbonne which passes through the centre of the commune and continues south to Salses-le-Château. Access to the village in the east of the commune is by road D105 which branches from the D6009 just north of the commune and goes to the village before continuing south to Peyriac-de-Mer. The A9 autoroute passes through the commune from north to south but has no exit in the commune. The nearest exit is Exit 38 some 4 km north of the commune which links to the D6009. Apart from the village there are the hamlets of Les Pesquis, Domaine de Java, and Prat de Cest.

The Étang de Bages-Sigean forms the entire eastern border of the commune with numerous streams flowing from the commune into it such as the Ruisseau Mairal, the Ruisseau de Boutoubouli, and the Ruisseau des Potences. A smaller Lake - the Étang de Saint-Paul - is on the southern border of the commune linked to the much larger Étang de Bages-Sigean with a dam forming the border of the commune.

== History ==
The origins of the site of the present commune date back to prehistoric times. According to historians tools found in Bages attest the presence of man from the Lower Paleolithic (80,000 years ago). Undoubtedly Neanderthal then Cro-Magnon men stayed on the shores of the Narbonne Gulf (sea at the time). The discovery of Neolithic sites proves the existence of significant human communities at that time.

It was under Roman occupation that a real settlement emerged. Many plots of land were distributed to senior army veterans and there were numerous luxurious villae. The origin of the current name is thought to have come from this period: BAÏA or BAÏES in Latin meaning "place of pleasure". Few traces remain of this period and they are often covered by vegetation. The most important are those of "Castellas" and "Monadières" - important Villae from the beginning of that era.

The population of the time left the flat areas to shelter from the wind by moving to the rocky outcrop seen today. This was a slightly dominant defensive position but also the climate and exposure allowed them to live without encroaching on arable land. The Cadran Solaire (Sundial) (11th century ) marks the entrance of the old village. A corner of the Lake can be seen from the narrow and steep streets.

The village of Bages is on the edge of the lake although agriculture, especially the vineyards, forms the core of its economy (the main square of the village dates to the Revolt of the Winemakers in 1907). Bages village is mostly considered as a fishing village.

=== Heraldry ===
Arms of Bages	The official status of the blazon remains to be determined. Blazon: Gules, a fesse fusilly of Or and Vert.

== Administration ==
List of Successive Mayors

From	To	Name
1870	1877	Louis Daude
1877	1878	Guilhaume Alberny
1878	1888	Louis Daude
1888	1891	Jean Daude
1891	1892	Auguste Gayraud
1892	1944	Gabriel Cros-Mayrevieille
1944	1945	Joseph Martin
1945	1977	Louis Alberny
1977	1983	René Chevrier
1983	1995	Georges Arcis
1995	2008	Claude Mulero
2008	2020	Marie Bat
2020	2026	Jean-Louis Rio

== Demography ==
The inhabitants of the commune are known as Bageois or Bageoises in French.

Historical population

Year	Pop.	±% p.a.
1793	716	—
1800	699	−0.34%
1806	698	−0.02%
1821	742	+0.41%
1831	875	+1.66%
1836	900	+0.57%
1841	864	−0.81%
1846	864	+0.00%
1851	876	+0.28%
1856	805	−1.68%
1861	881	+1.82%
1866	924	+0.96%
1872	1,018	+1.63%
1876	1,146	+3.01%
1881	1,193	+0.81%
1886	1,163	−0.51%
1891	1,137	−0.45%
1896	1,136	−0.02%
1901	1,124	−0.21%

Year	Pop.	±% p.a.
1906	1,022	−1.88%
1911	1,030	+0.16%
1921	917	−1.16%
1926	799	−2.72%
1931	791	−0.20%
1936	711	−2.11%
1946	542	−2.68%
1954	549	+0.16%
1962	559	+0.23%
1968	558	−0.03%
1975	572	+0.35%
1982	547	−0.64%
1990	694	+3.02%
1999	755	+0.94%
2007	826	+1.13%
2012	864	+0.90%
2017	803	−1.45%
2023	720	−1.80%

Source: EHESS and INSEE

== Economy ==
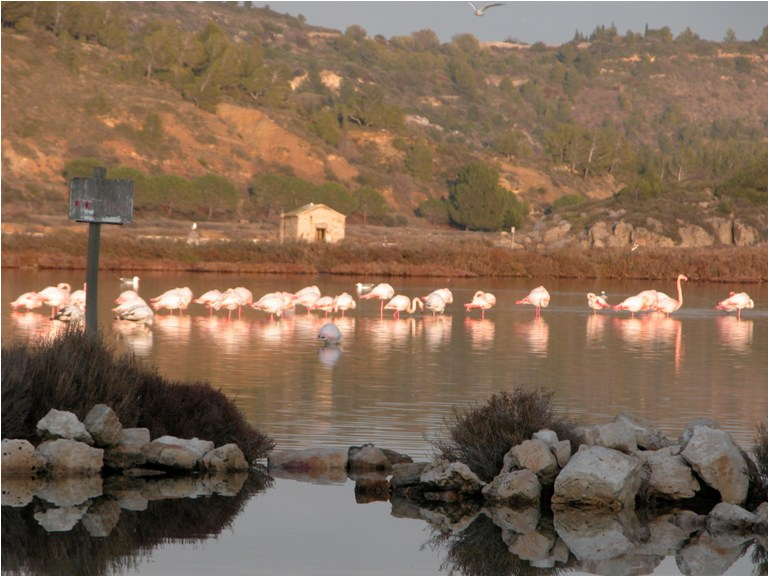
Flamingos at Bages

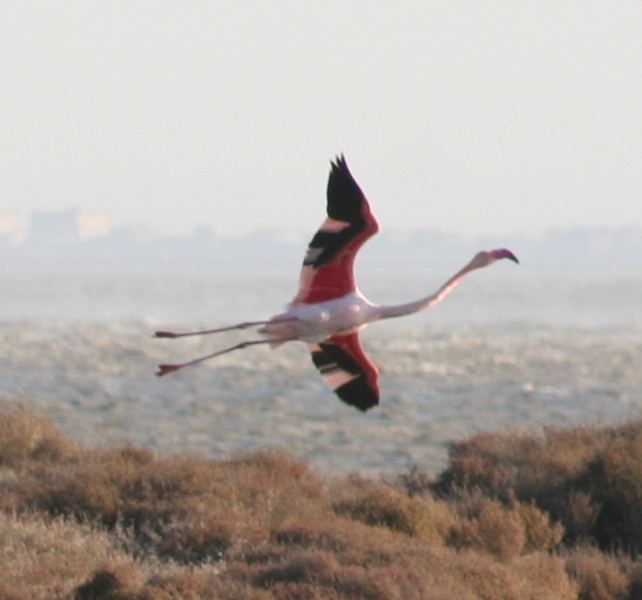
A Flamingo at Bages

Art is prominent in the commune with Painters, sculptors, visual artists, musicians, storytellers, and cabinet makers drawing inspiration. There are four permanent Art galleries: La Maison des Arts, L'Etang Art (which also has publishing activity through Les Temps d'Art Graphique), Latuvu and NullepArt.

The commune is in the zone of the Vin de pays des Coteaux du Littoral Audois (Local wine of Coteaux du Littoral Audois)

In the fishing village the main produce is eel which is prepared in bouillabaisse style.

== Culture and heritage ==
=== Civil heritage ===
- The Monument of the Republic in the Place de Juin 1907 (1888) is registered as an historical object.

=== Religious heritage ===
The Church contains several items that are registered as historical objects:

- A Statue: Saint Delphine of Sabran (19th century)
- 2 Statues: Saints Martin of Tours and Paul of Narbonne
- A Painting: Christ on the cross between Saints Paul of Narbonne and Martin of Tours (17th century)
- A Thurible (19th century)

== Notable people linked to the commune ==
- Pierre Dumayet (1923-2011), writer, journalist, scriptwriter, and French producer, was buried in the cemetery at Bages.
- Gianfredo Camesi, Swiss artist who lived in Bages in 1975.
- Jean-Pierre Serre, mathematician who was born in Bages.
- Pierrette Bloch, artist who had a second home in Bages.
- Jean-Michel Meurice, painter who lives in Bages, cofounder of ARTE.
- Matias Spescha, paintre, sculpteur, graveur suisse who lived in Bages.

== See also ==
- Corbières AOC
- Communes of the Aude department

== Bibliography ==
- Jean Guiffan, History of Bages and its inhabitants, Éditions Élysiques, 2007, 233 pages, paperback, ISBN 2-9528777-0-X, ISBN 978-2952877701 (in French)
