= Cave Creek =

Cave Creek may refer to:

- Cave Creek, Arizona, a town in Arizona
- Cave Creek, Tennessee, an unincorporated community in Tennessee
- Cave Creek, Texas, an unincorporated area in Texas north of Fredericksburg
- Cave Creek / Kotihotiho, a stream on the West Coast of New Zealand
  - The Cave Creek disaster in New Zealand's Paparoa National Park, in which fourteen people died
- Cave Creek (Boone County), a stream in Missouri
- Cave Creek (Petite Saline Creek), a stream in Missouri
- Cave Creek School, Gillespie County, Texas
- Cave Creek (PCH), the codename for an Intel chipset
