= The Cave =

The Cave may refer to:

== Literature ==
- "The Cave", a 1943 short story by P. Schuyler Miller
- The Cave, a 1959 novel by Robert Penn Warren
- The Cave (novel), a 2001 novel by José Saramago
- The Cave (play), a 2010 play written by Mervyn Peake in the mid-1950s
- Al-Kahf ('The Cave'), the eighteenth sura of the Qur'an

== Film ==
- The Cave (2005 film), a thriller film
- The Cave (2009 film), a Canadian short science fiction film,
- The Cave (2019 Syrian film), a Syrian-Danish documentary film
- The Cave (2019 Thai film), a Thai thriller film

== Music ==
- The Cave (opera), a 1994 multimedia opera by Steve Reich
- "The Cave" (song), a 2009 song by Mumford & Sons
- The Cave, 2019-2024 video series by Kenny Beats

== Other uses ==
- H2 (Canada), a Canadian television channel previously known as The Cave
- The Cave (video game), a 2013 video game by Double Fine Productions
- The Cave (pub), a student pub at Carleton College

== See also ==
- Cave (disambiguation)
- Allegory of the cave, Plato
