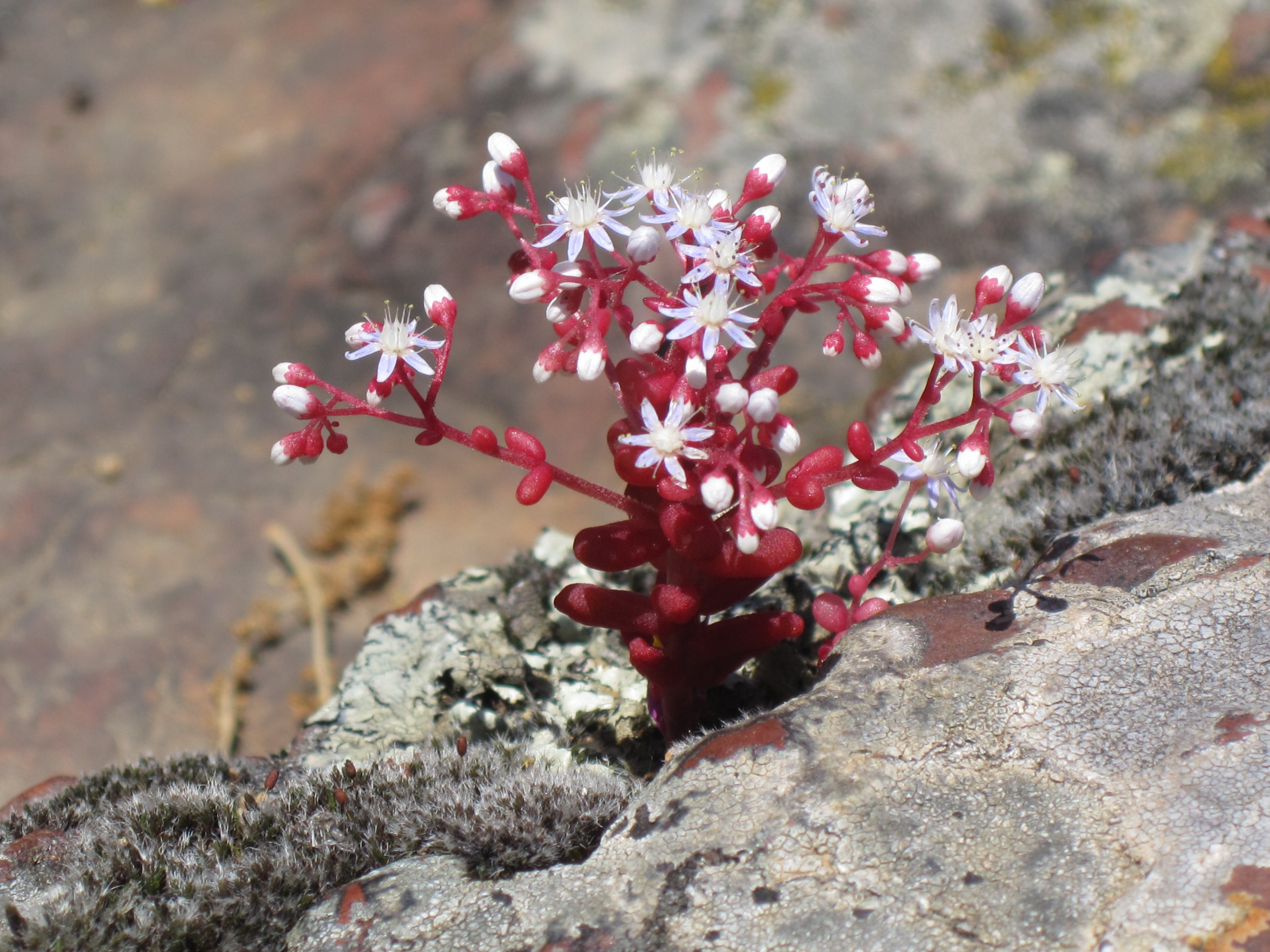
- S. caeruleum photographed on Corsica

Scientific classification
- Kingdom: Plantae
- Clade: Tracheophytes
- Clade: Angiosperms
- Clade: Eudicots
- Order: Saxifragales
- Family: Crassulaceae
- Genus: Sedum
- Species: S. caeruleum

Binomial name
- Sedum caeruleum L.

Synonyms
- Anacampseros caerulescens Timb.-Lagr.; Oreosedum caeruleum (L.) Grulich; Sedum azureum Desf.; Sedum caeruleum var. pusillum Maire; Sedum coeruleum Vahl; Sedum heptapetalum Poir.; Sedum hexapetalum Haw.

= Sedum caeruleum =

Species of succulent

Sedum caeruleum, commonly known as the azure stonecrop, sky stone-crop, baby-blue stone-crop or red-leaf, is a species of Sedum from the family Crassulaceae. It is native to Algeria, Morocco, Tunisia, Sardinia, Corsica, and Sicily. The plant is a short, bushy annual with pale blue flowers. The leaves are succulent, narrowly oblong, and usually tinted red.
