= Lagrave (disambiguation) =

Lagrave is a commune in the Tarn department in southern France.

Lagrave may also refer to:

- LaGrave Field, an abandoned baseball park in Fort Worth, Texas
- Édouard Timbal-Lagrave (1819-1888), French pharmacist and botanist
- Frédéric Labadie-Lagrave (1844-1917), French physician
- Maxime Vachier-Lagrave (born 1990), French chess grandmaster

== See also ==
- Ambarès-et-Lagrave, a commune in the Gironde department in the Nouvelle-Aquitaine region of southwestern France
- La Grave, a commune in the Hautes-Alpes department in southeastern France
