= Fitou AOC =

French wine appellation

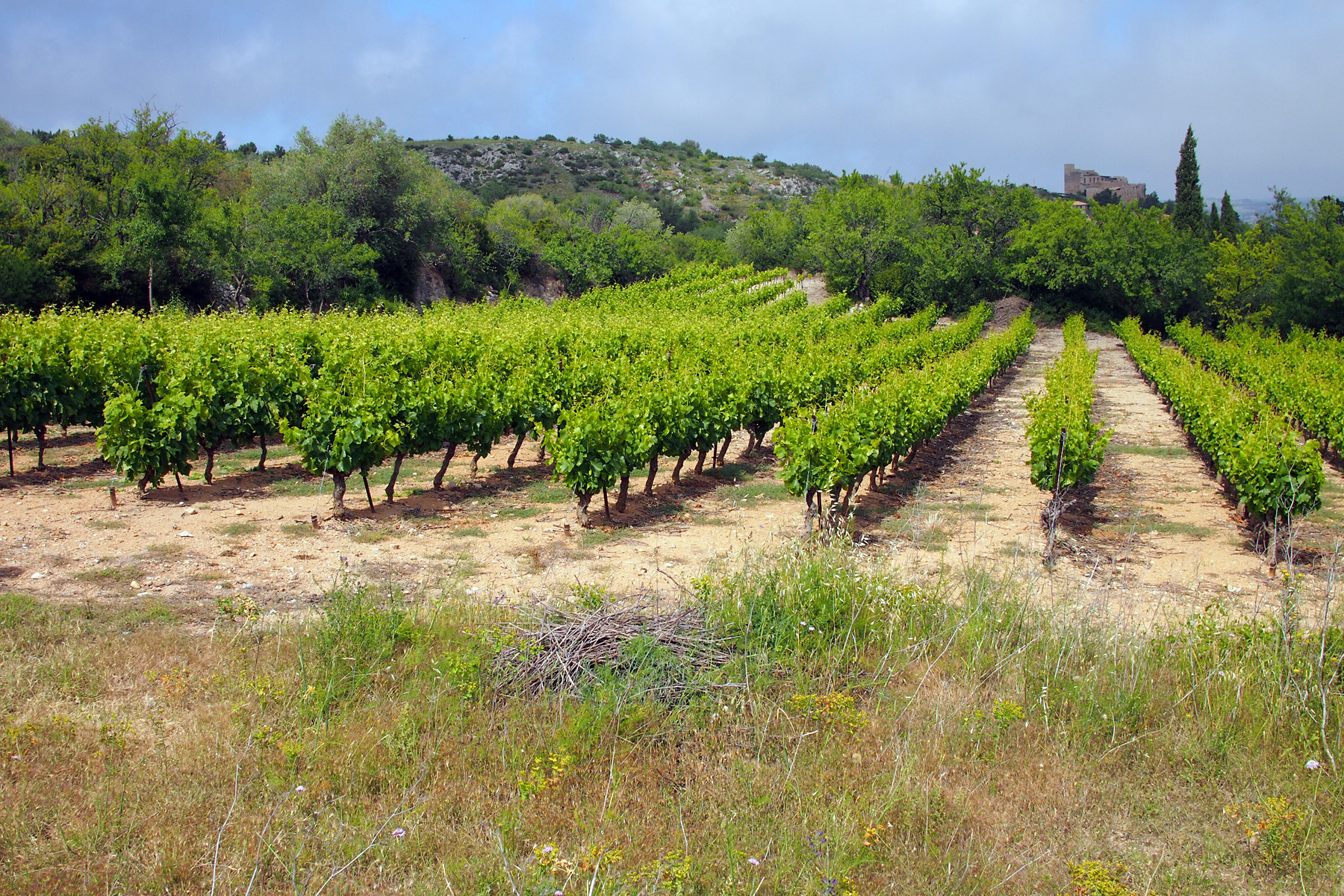
Winegrowing in Fitou

Fitou (French pronunciation: [fitu]; Occitan: Fiton) is a large French wine appellation in Languedoc-Roussillon, France. The dominant vine variety is Carignan which has to constitute 40% of any blend for that to qualify for the appellation. Grenache, Lladoner Pelut (the 'hairy' Grenache), Mourvèdre and Syrah are often blended with it. Muscat de Rivesaltes AOC, a vin doux naturel, also comes from the region.

== Production area ==
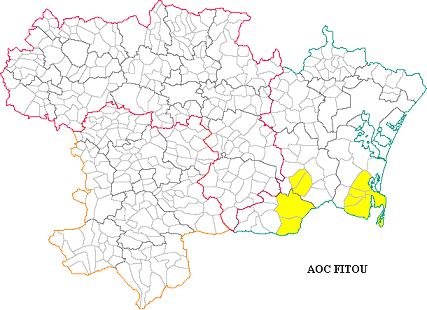
Area of AOC Fitou

The production area covers the following communes of the Aude department:

- Canton of Durban-Corbières : Cascastel-des-Corbières and Villeneuve-les-Corbières
- Canton of Tuchan : Paziols and Tuchan
- Canton of Sigean : Caves, Fitou, La Palme, Leucate and Treilles

== See also ==
- List of appellations in Languedoc-Roussillon
