= Wolf Creek (Greenbrier River tributary) =

Stream in West Virginia, U.S.

Coordinates: 37°36′20″N 80°48′19″W

Wolf Creek is a stream in the U.S. state of West Virginia. It is a tributary of Greenbrier River.

Wolf Creek was so named for the fact the creek was a favorite trapping ground of wolves.

Hardy Run flows into this creek.

== See also ==
- List of rivers of West Virginia
