= Paziols =

Commune in Occitanie, France

- Commune
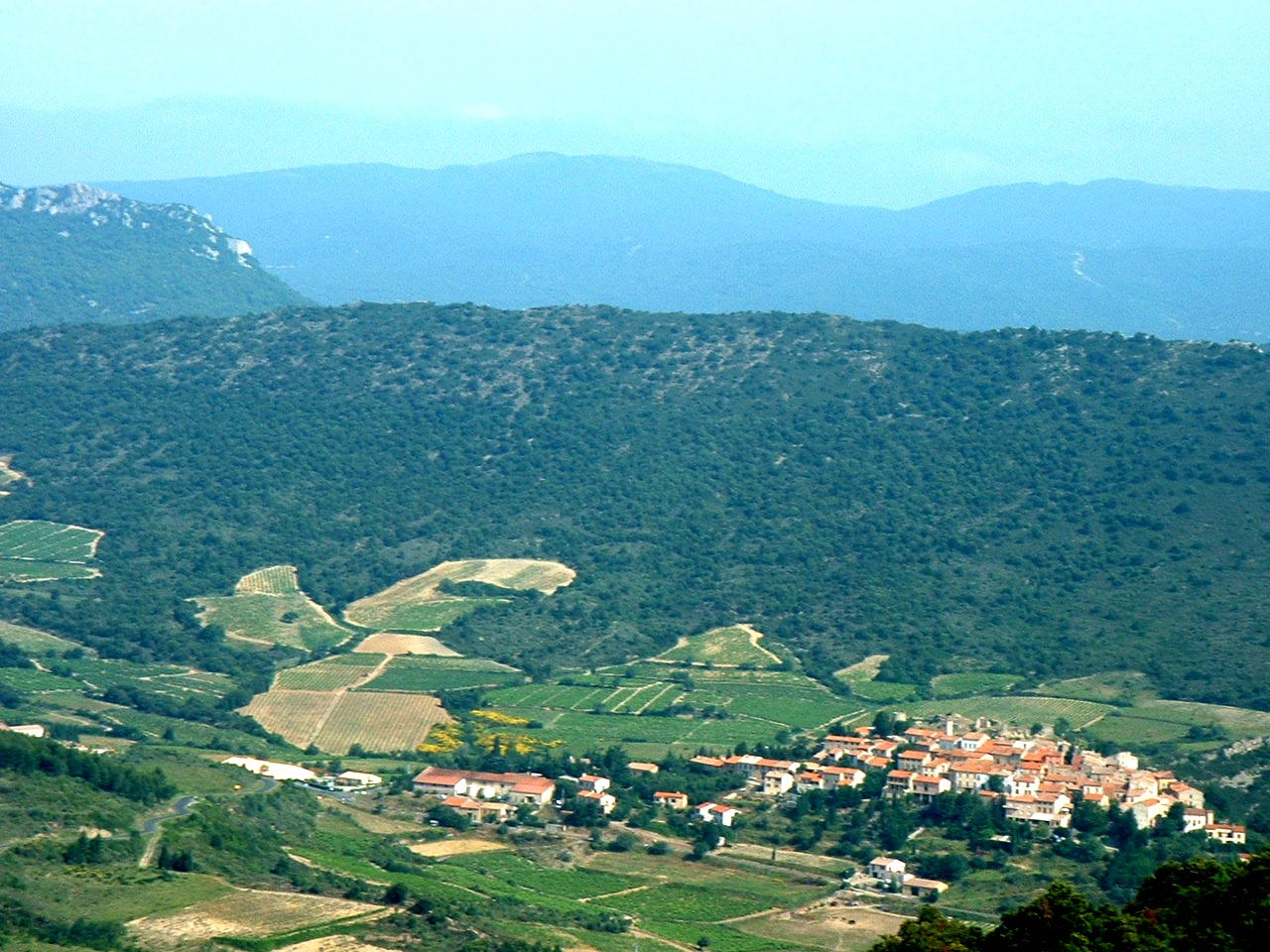
- A general view of Paziols

- Coat of arms
- Location of Paziols
- Location within France Location within Occitanie
- Coordinates: 42°51′32″N 2°43′15″E
- Country: France
- Region: Occitania
- Department: Aude
- Arrondissement: Narbonne
- Canton: Les Corbières
- Intercommunality: Corbières Salanque Méditerranée

Government
  - Mayor (2020–2026): Jonathan Oakes
- Area^{1}: 28.02 km^{2} (10.82 sq mi)
- Elevation: 136 m (446 ft)
- Highest elevation: 560 m (1,840 ft)
- Lowest elevation: 110 m (360 ft)
- Population (2023): 526
  - Density: 18.8/km^{2} (48.6/sq mi)
- Time zone: UTC+01:00 (CET)
  - Summer (DST): UTC+02:00 (CEST)
- INSEE/Postal code: 11276 /11350
- ^{1} French Land Register data, which excludes lakes, ponds, glaciers > 1 km^{2} (0.386 sq mi or 247 acres) and river estuaries.

Paziols (French pronunciation: [pazjɔl]; Occitan: Pasiòls) is a commune in the Aude department in southern France.

== Population ==
Historical population
Year	Pop.	±% p.a.
1968	676	—
1975	601	−1.67%
1982	610	+0.21%
1990	562	−1.02%
1999	512	−1.03%
2007	519	+0.17%
2012	520	+0.04%
2017	528	+0.31%
2023	526	−0.06%
Source: INSEE

== See also ==
- Fitou AOC
- Corbières AOC
- Communes of the Aude department
