= La Palme, Aude =

Commune in Occitanie, France

La Palme
- Commune
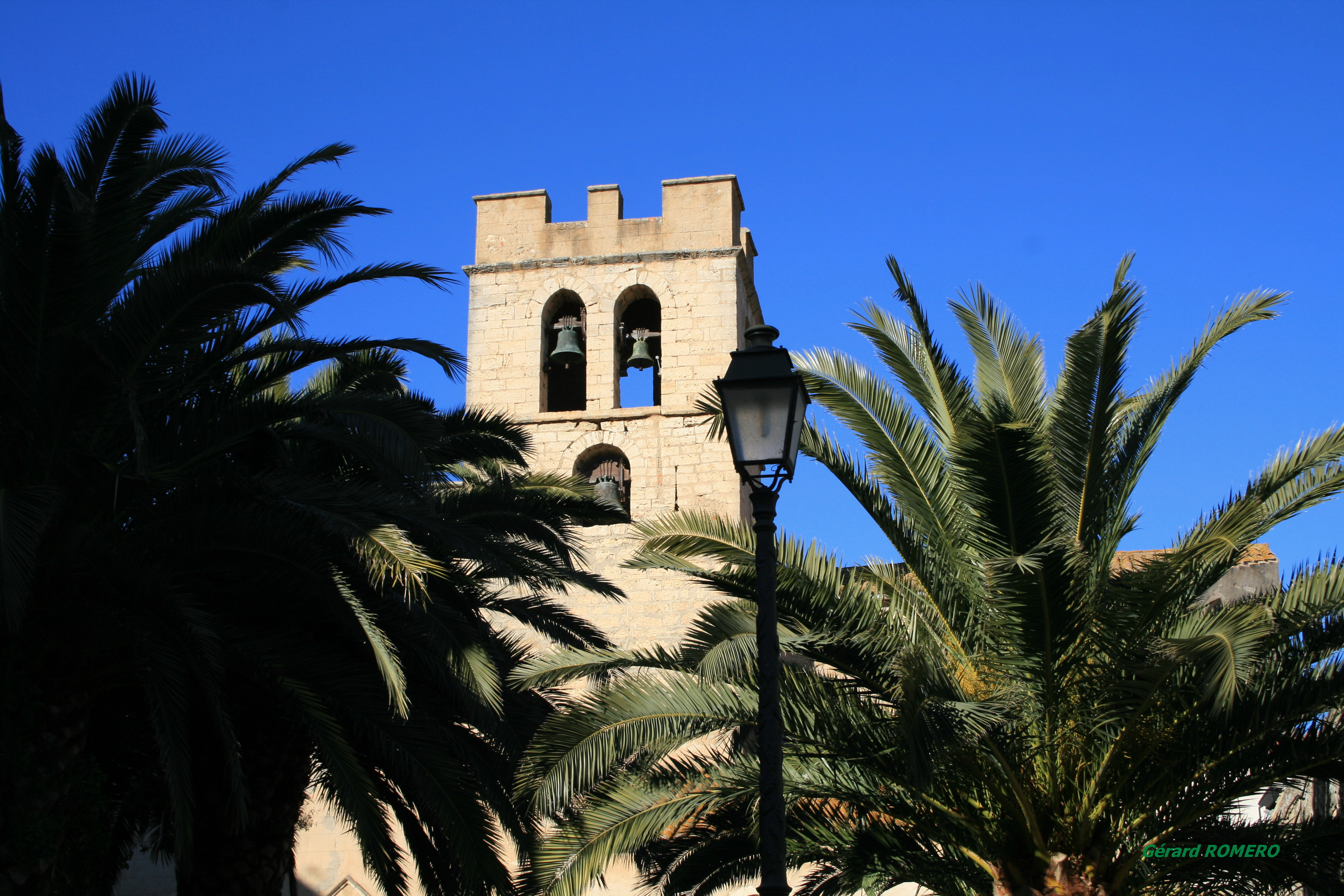
- The church in La Palme

- Coat of arms
- Location of La Palme
- Location within France Location within Occitanie
- Coordinates: 42°58′32″N 2°59′37″E
- Country: France
- Region: Occitania
- Department: Aude
- Arrondissement: Narbonne
- Canton: Les Corbières Méditerranée
- Intercommunality: Grand Narbonne

Government
  - Mayor (2020–2026): Jean-Paul Fauran
- Area^{1}: 27.47 km^{2} (10.61 sq mi)
- Elevation: 10 m (33 ft)
- Highest elevation: 201 m (659 ft)
- Lowest elevation: 0 m (0 ft)
- Population (2023): 1,995
  - Density: 72.62/km^{2} (188.1/sq mi)
- Time zone: UTC+01:00 (CET)
  - Summer (DST): UTC+02:00 (CEST)
- INSEE/Postal code: 11188 /11480
- ^{1} French Land Register data, which excludes lakes, ponds, glaciers > 1 km^{2} (0.386 sq mi or 247 acres) and river estuaries.

La Palme (French pronunciation: [la palm]; Occitan: La Pauma, before 1995: Lapalme) is a commune in the Aude department in southern France. Its origins date at least to 805 AD, when the priory was given to the Abbey of La Grasse by Charlemagne.

== Population ==
Historical population
Year	Pop.	±% p.a.
1968	851	—
1975	865	+0.23%
1982	935	+1.12%
1990	1,009	+0.96%
1999	1,151	+1.47%
2007	1,469	+3.10%
2012	1,586	+1.54%
2017	1,693	+1.31%
2023	1,995	+2.77%
Source: INSEE

== See also ==
- Fitou AOC
- Corbières AOC
- Communes of the Aude department
