= Treilles =

Commune in Occitanie, France

- Commune
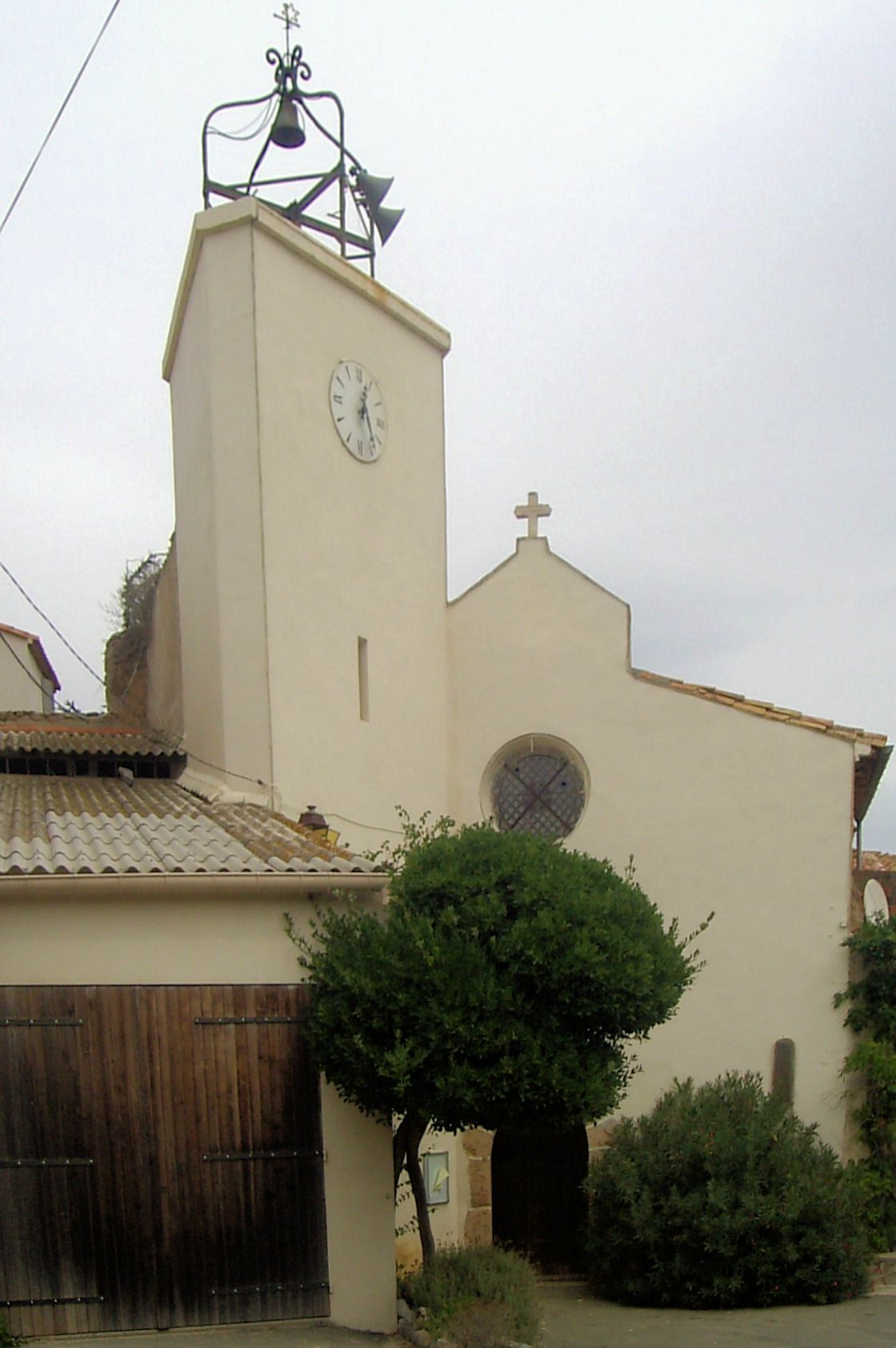
- The church in Treilles

- Coat of arms
- Location of Treilles
- Location within France Location within Occitanie
- Coordinates: 42°55′27″N 2°56′41″E
- Country: France
- Region: Occitania
- Department: Aude
- Arrondissement: Narbonne
- Canton: Les Corbières Méditerranée
- Intercommunality: Grand Narbonne

Government
  - Mayor (2020–2026): Gérard Lucien
- Area^{1}: 12.42 km^{2} (4.80 sq mi)
- Elevation: 29 m (95 ft)
- Highest elevation: 305 m (1,001 ft)
- Lowest elevation: 20 m (66 ft)
- Population (2023): 271
  - Density: 21.8/km^{2} (56.5/sq mi)
- Time zone: UTC+01:00 (CET)
  - Summer (DST): UTC+02:00 (CEST)
- INSEE/Postal code: 11398 /11510
- ^{1} French Land Register data, which excludes lakes, ponds, glaciers > 1 km^{2} (0.386 sq mi or 247 acres) and river estuaries.

Treilles (French pronunciation: [tʁɛj]; Occitan: Trelhas) is a commune in the Aude department in southern France.

== Population ==
Historical population
Year	Pop.	±% p.a.
1968	137	—
1975	104	−3.86%
1982	108	+0.54%
1990	135	+2.83%
1999	163	+2.12%
2007	180	+1.25%
2012	223	+4.38%
2017	247	+2.07%
2023	271	+1.56%
Source: INSEE

== See also ==
- Fitou AOC
- Corbières AOC
- Communes of the Aude department
