= Émile Raunié =

French historian (1854–1911)

Marie-André-Alfred-Émile Raunié, (18 November 1854 in Gruissan – 28 September 1911) was a French historian.

A graduate ès lettres, Raunié passed the archivist-paleographer diploma in 1878 with his thesis, Les Institutions municipales de Narbonne au Moyen-âge (1229-1508).

Later on, he was redactor at the ministry of public instruction.

== Bibliography ==
- 1879 - Études administratives : le dépôt légal.
- 1879–1884 - Chansonnier historique du XVIIIe siècle. (Recueil Clairambault-Maurepas), 10 volumes. Read vol. 1, 2, 3, 4, 5, 6, 7, 8, 9, and 10
- 1881 - Souvenirs et correspondance de Madame de Caylus. Read online, Prix Archon-Despérouses of the Académie française
- 1884 - Mémoires et réflexions sur les principaux évènements du règne de Louis XIV, par le marquis de La Fare.
- 1888 - La réforme de l'instruction nationale et le surmenage intellectuel. Read online
- 1890–1899 - Épitaphier du vieux Paris Read online. 3 volumes, dans l'Histoire générale de Paris.

== Sources ==
- Chronique Bibliothèque de l'École des chartes. Volume 72, 1911, (pp. 725–726)
