= Feuilla =

Commune in Occitanie, France

Feuilla Fulhan
- Commune
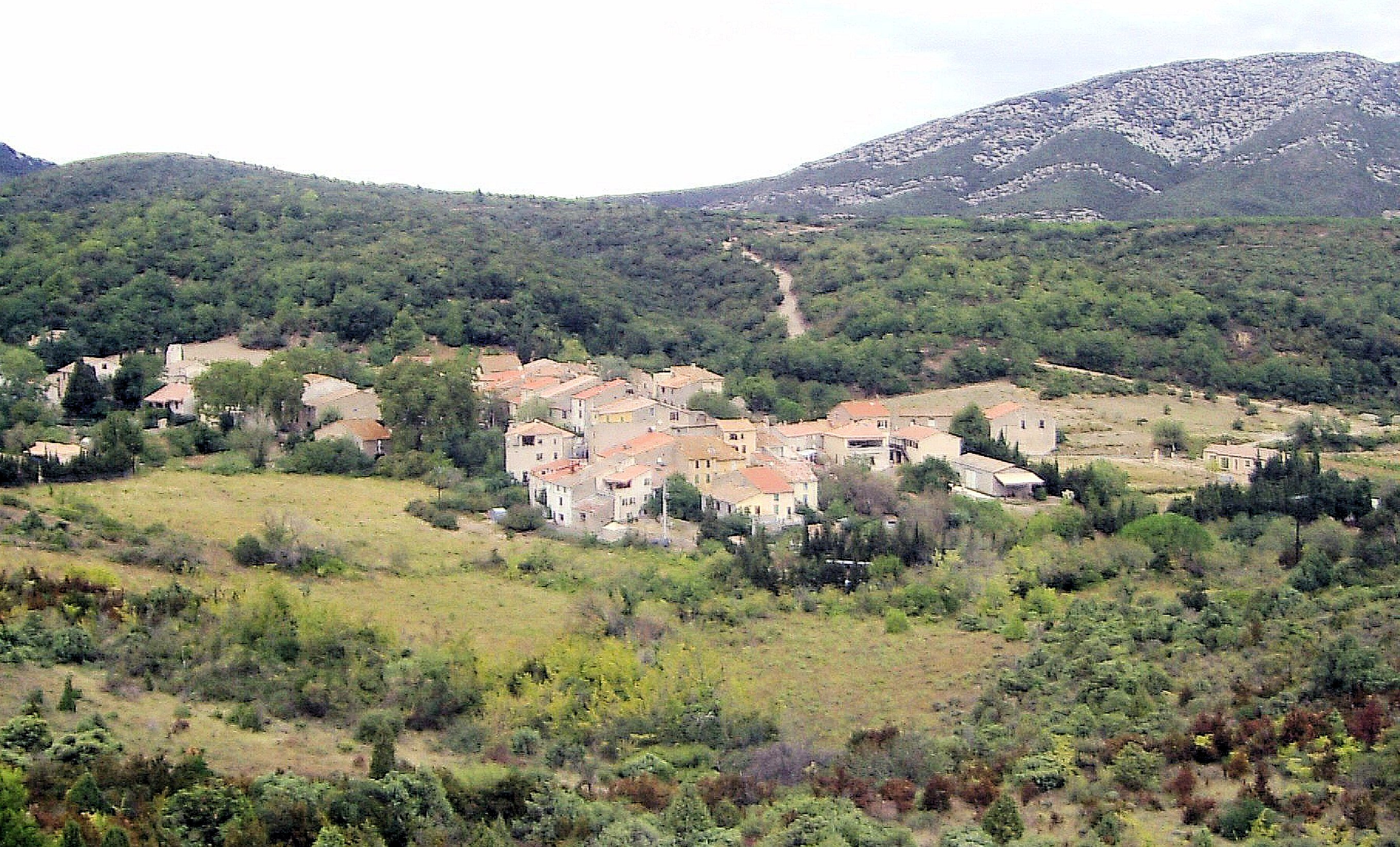
- A general view of Feuilla

- Coat of arms
- Location of Feuilla
- Location within France Location within Occitanie
- Coordinates: 42°55′59″N 2°54′40″E
- Country: France
- Region: Occitania
- Department: Aude
- Arrondissement: Narbonne
- Canton: Les Corbières Méditerranée

Government
  - Mayor (2024–2026): Marie-Jose Gleizes
- Area^{1}: 24.12 km^{2} (9.31 sq mi)
- Elevation: 167 m (548 ft)
- Highest elevation: 709 m (2,326 ft)
- Lowest elevation: 100 m (330 ft)
- Population (2023): 107
  - Density: 4.44/km^{2} (11.5/sq mi)
- Time zone: UTC+01:00 (CET)
  - Summer (DST): UTC+02:00 (CEST)
- INSEE/Postal code: 11143 /11510
- ^{1} French Land Register data, which excludes lakes, ponds, glaciers > 1 km^{2} (0.386 sq mi or 247 acres) and river estuaries.

Feuilla (French pronunciation: [fœja]; Occitan: Fulhan) is a commune in the Aude department in southern France.

== Population ==
Historical population
Year	Pop.	±% p.a.
1968	106	—
1975	81	−3.77%
1982	70	−2.06%
1990	68	−0.36%
1999	78	+1.54%
2007	98	+2.89%
2012	95	−0.62%
2017	104	+1.83%
2023	107	+0.48%
Source: INSEE

== See also ==
- Corbières AOC
- Communes of the Aude department
