= Roquefort-des-Corbières =

Commune in Occitanie, France

- Commune
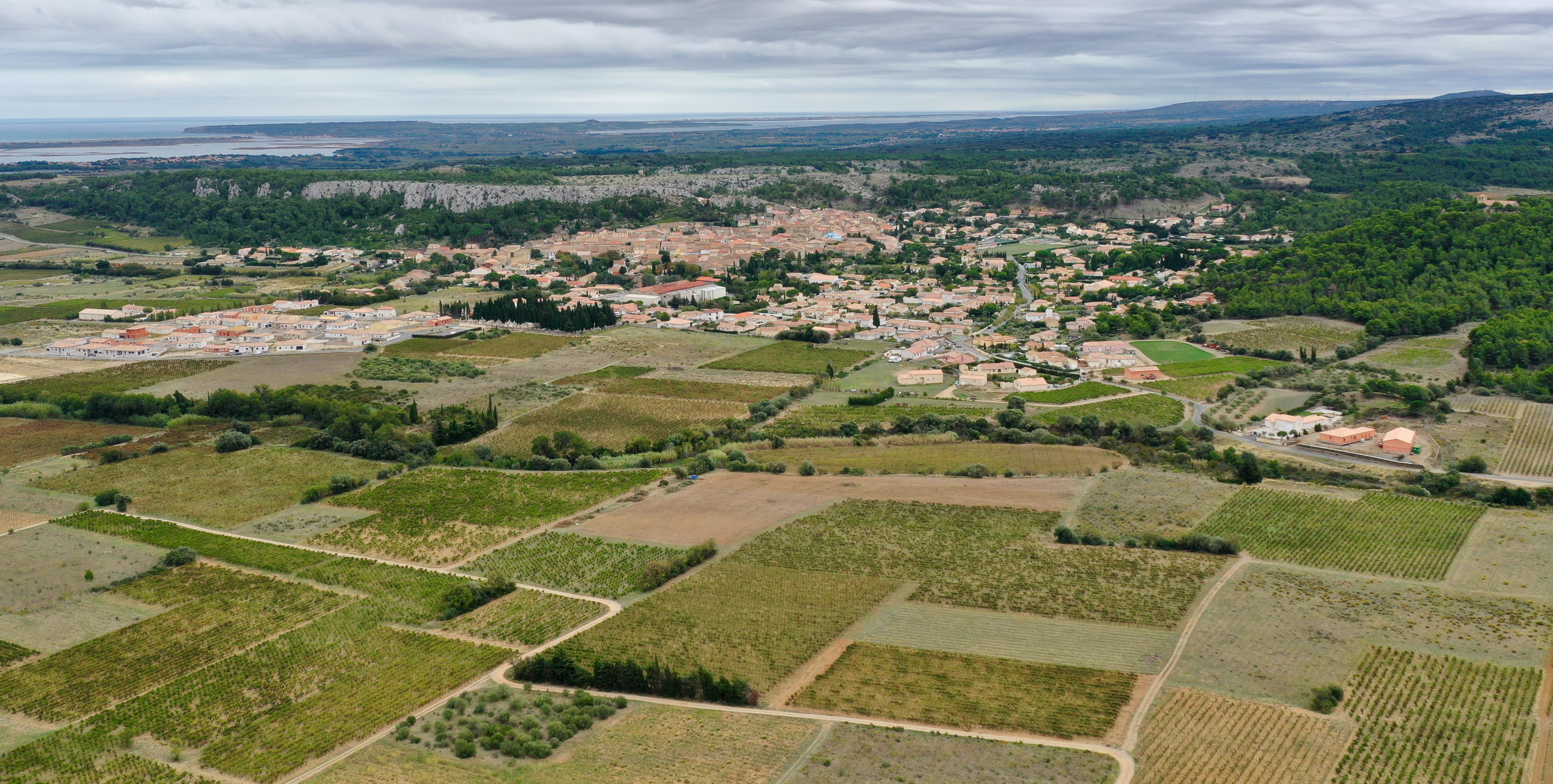
- Aerial view

- Coat of arms
- Location of Roquefort-des-Corbières
- Location within France Location within Occitanie
- Coordinates: 42°59′30″N 2°57′15″E
- Country: France
- Region: Occitania
- Department: Aude
- Arrondissement: Narbonne
- Canton: Les Corbières Méditerranée
- Intercommunality: Grand Narbonne

Government
  - Mayor (2021–2026): Luc Castan
- Area^{1}: 45.44 km^{2} (17.54 sq mi)
- Elevation: 117 m (384 ft)
- Highest elevation: 540 m (1,770 ft)
- Lowest elevation: 10 m (33 ft)
- Population (2023): 1,051
  - Density: 23.13/km^{2} (59.90/sq mi)
- Time zone: UTC+01:00 (CET)
  - Summer (DST): UTC+02:00 (CEST)
- INSEE/Postal code: 11322 /11540
- ^{1} French Land Register data, which excludes lakes, ponds, glaciers > 1 km^{2} (0.386 sq mi or 247 acres) and river estuaries.

Roquefort-des-Corbières is a commune in the Aude department in southern France.

== Population ==
Historical population
Year	Pop.	±% p.a.
1968	621	—
1975	657	+0.81%
1982	560	−2.26%
1990	616	+1.20%
1999	664	+0.84%
2007	912	+4.05%
2012	1,004	+1.94%
2017	1,024	+0.40%
2023	1,051	+0.43%
Source: INSEE

== See also ==
- Corbières AOC
- Communes of the Aude department
