= Fitou =

Commune in Occitanie, France

- Commune
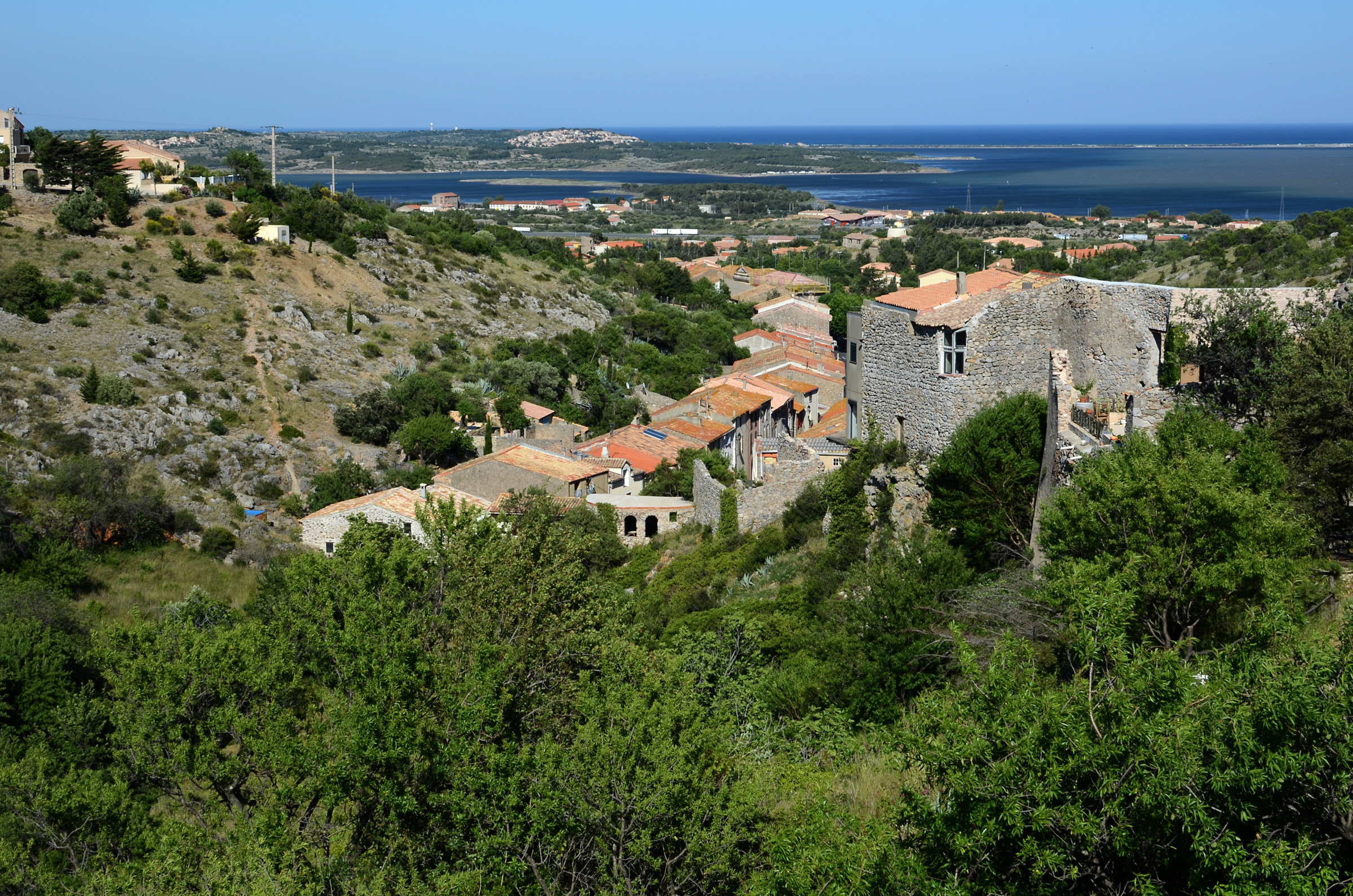
- A general view of Fitou

- Coat of arms
- Location of Fitou
- Location within France Location within Occitanie
- Coordinates: 42°53′40″N 2°58′46″E
- Country: France
- Region: Occitania
- Department: Aude
- Arrondissement: Narbonne
- Canton: Les Corbières Méditerranée

Government
  - Mayor (2020–2026): Alexis Armangau
- Area^{1}: 30.25 km^{2} (11.68 sq mi)
- Elevation: 33 m (108 ft)
- Highest elevation: 318 m (1,043 ft)
- Lowest elevation: 0 m (0 ft)
- Population (2023): 1,158
  - Density: 38.28/km^{2} (99.15/sq mi)
- Time zone: UTC+01:00 (CET)
  - Summer (DST): UTC+02:00 (CEST)
- INSEE/Postal code: 11144 /11510
- ^{1} French Land Register data, which excludes lakes, ponds, glaciers > 1 km^{2} (0.386 sq mi or 247 acres) and river estuaries.

Fitou (French pronunciation: [fitu]; Occitan: Fitor) is a commune in the Aude department in southern France.

== Population ==
Historical population
Year	Pop.	±% p.a.
1968	555	—
1975	537	−0.47%
1982	542	+0.13%
1990	579	+0.83%
1999	676	+1.74%
2007	840	+2.75%
2012	1,013	+3.82%
2017	1,060	+0.91%
2023	1,158	+1.48%
Source: INSEE

== Wine ==
Fitou has a red wine appellation; see Fitou AOC.

== See also ==
- Corbières AOC
- Communes of the Aude department
