= Gruissan =

Commune in Occitanie, France

- Commune
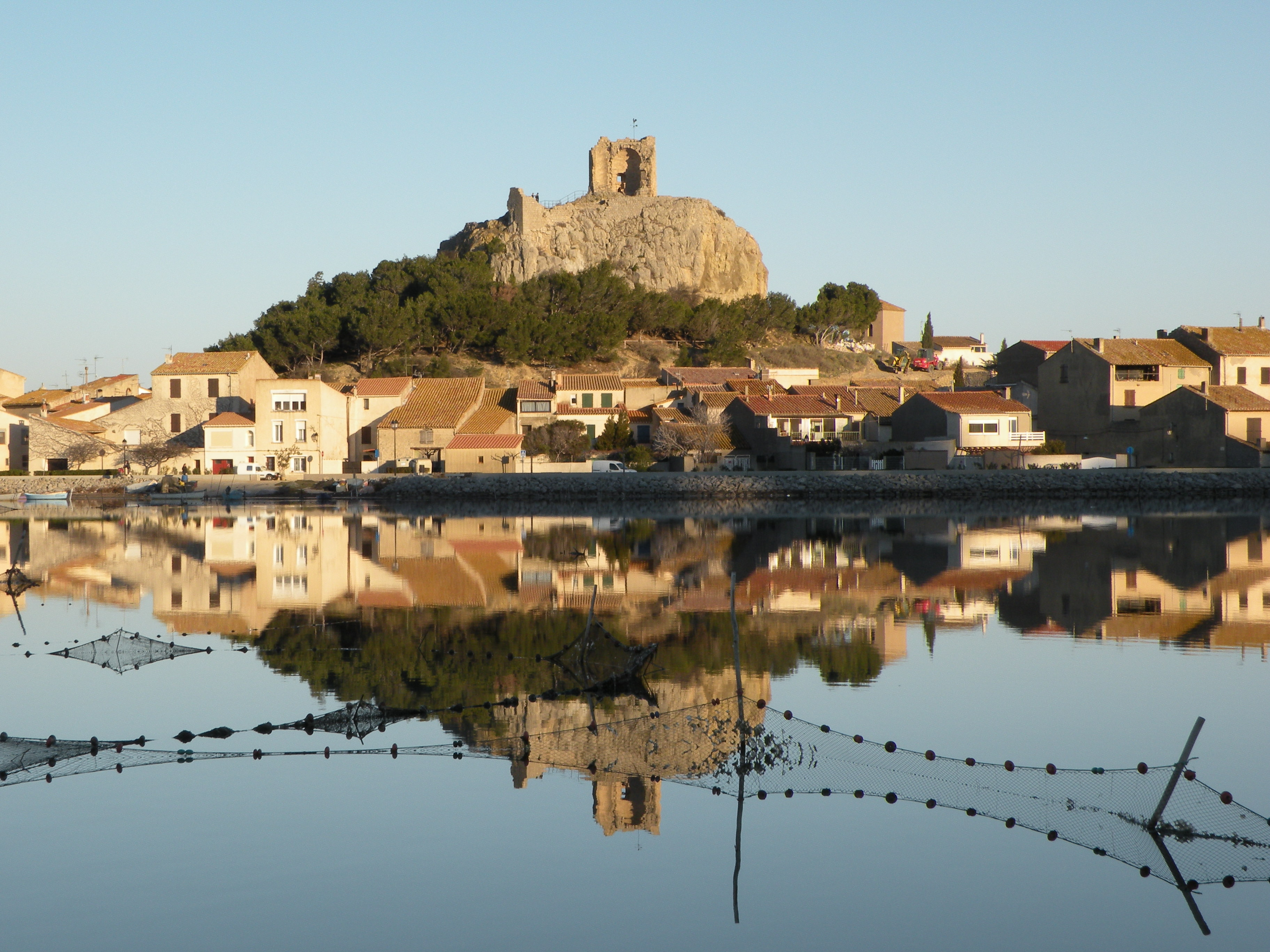
- Historical city centre with the ruin of the Barberousse tower

- Coat of arms
- Location of Gruissan
- Location within France Location within Occitanie
- Coordinates: 43°06′28″N 3°05′20″E
- Country: France
- Region: Occitania
- Department: Aude
- Arrondissement: Narbonne
- Canton: Narbonne-2
- Intercommunality: Grand Narbonne

Government
  - Mayor (2020–2026): Didier Codorniou
- Area^{1}: 43.65 km^{2} (16.85 sq mi)
- Elevation: 2 m (6.6 ft)
- Highest elevation: 200 m (660 ft)
- Lowest elevation: 0 m (0 ft)
- Population (2023): 5,032
  - Density: 115.3/km^{2} (298.6/sq mi)
- Time zone: UTC+01:00 (CET)
  - Summer (DST): UTC+02:00 (CEST)
- INSEE/Postal code: 11170 /11430
- ^{1} French Land Register data, which excludes lakes, ponds, glaciers > 1 km^{2} (0.386 sq mi or 247 acres) and river estuaries.

Gruissan (French pronunciation: [ɡʁɥisɑ̃]; Occitan: Grussan) is a commune in the Aude department in southern France. The historian Émile Raunié (1854–1911) was born in Gruissan.

== Population ==
Historical population
Year	Pop.	±% p.a.
1968	1,258	—
1975	1,269	+0.12%
1982	1,594	+3.31%
1990	2,170	+3.93%
1999	3,061	+3.90%
2007	4,272	+4.25%
2012	4,631	+1.63%
2017	5,000	+1.55%
2023	5,032	+0.11%
Source: INSEE

== The town ==
Situated on the Mediterranean coast of Southern France, Gruissan is situated in the Parc naturel régional de la Narbonnaise en Méditerranée. Traditionally a fishing village, the circular town is built around the former castle; a 10th-century château of which only the Tour Barberousse (Redbeard Tower) remains.

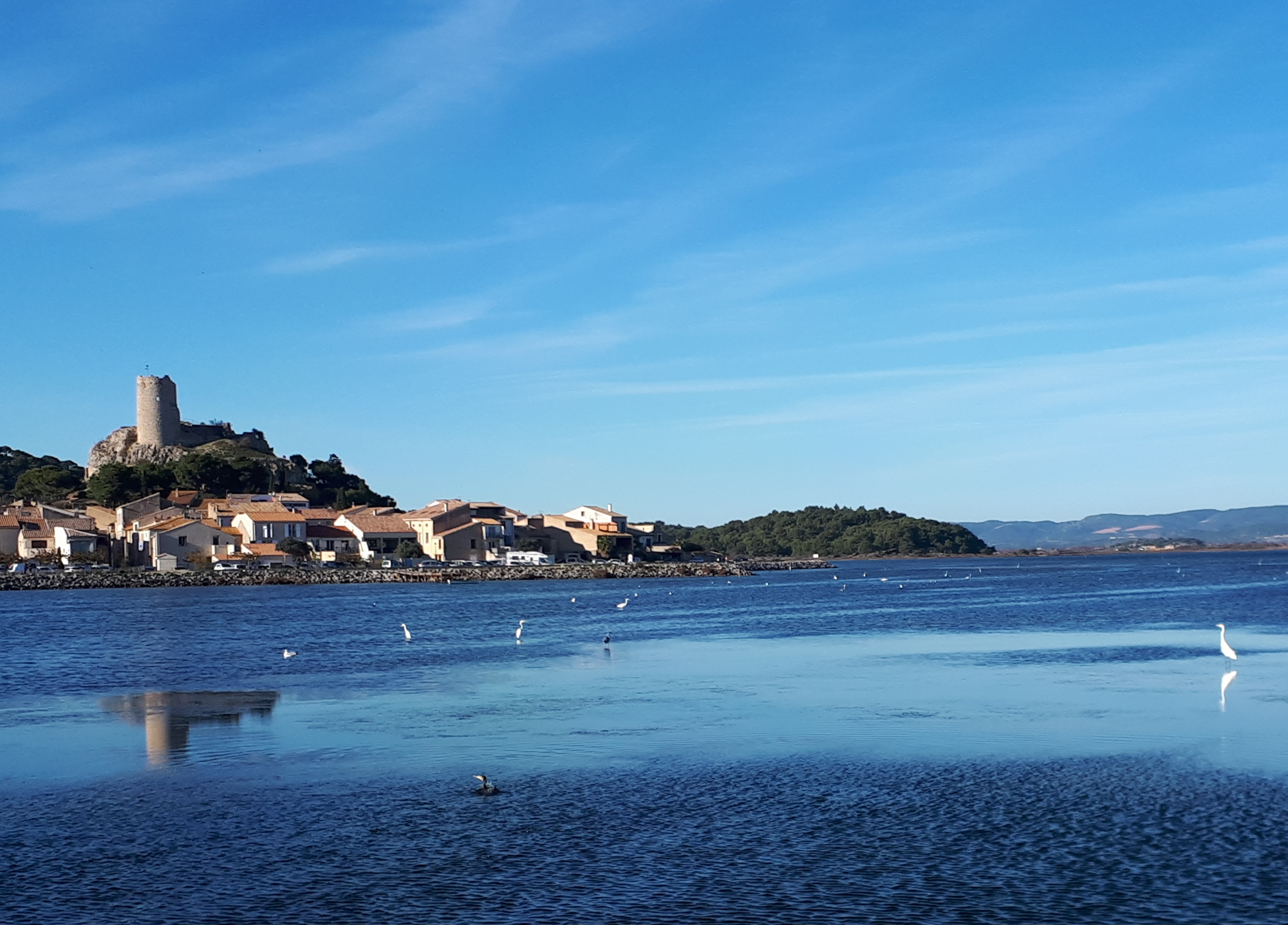
Egrets on the Étang de Gruissan.

== See also ==
- Corbières AOC
- Communes of the Aude department
