= Tour Barberousse =

Tower in village of Gruissan, France

Coordinates: 43°6′28″N 3°5′4″E

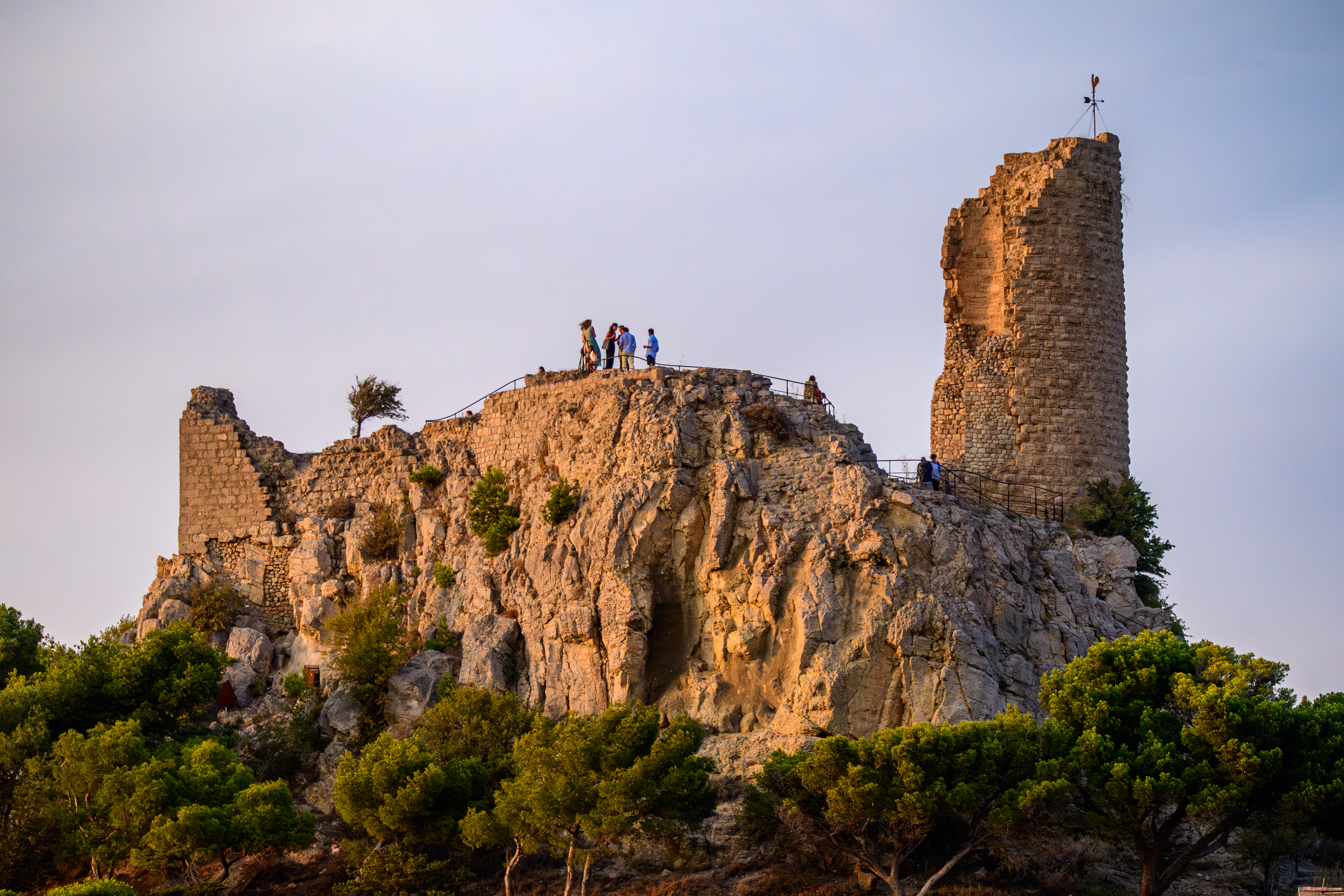

The Tour Barberousse (in English, Redbeard Tower) is in the coastal village of Gruissan in the Aude département of France.

The tower is all that remains of a castle built at the end of the 10th century to observe the approaches to the harbour at Narbonne and to guard against seaborne invasions of the city. Built on a steep, rocky hill, the castle was enlarged in the 12th century by the Archbishop of Narbonne, Guillaume de Broa.

In the 16th century it was dismantled on the orders of Richelieu and has been left neglected since then.

Today, the village of Gruissan surrounds the castle remains. The view from the castle site over the village and surrounding coastline is quite spectacular. The tower and the ruins of the castle are listed as a monument historique by the French Ministry of Culture.

== See also ==
- List of castles in France
