= Blue Elephant Theatre =

Community theatre in Camberwell, London

Coordinates: 51°28′48″N 0°5′54″W

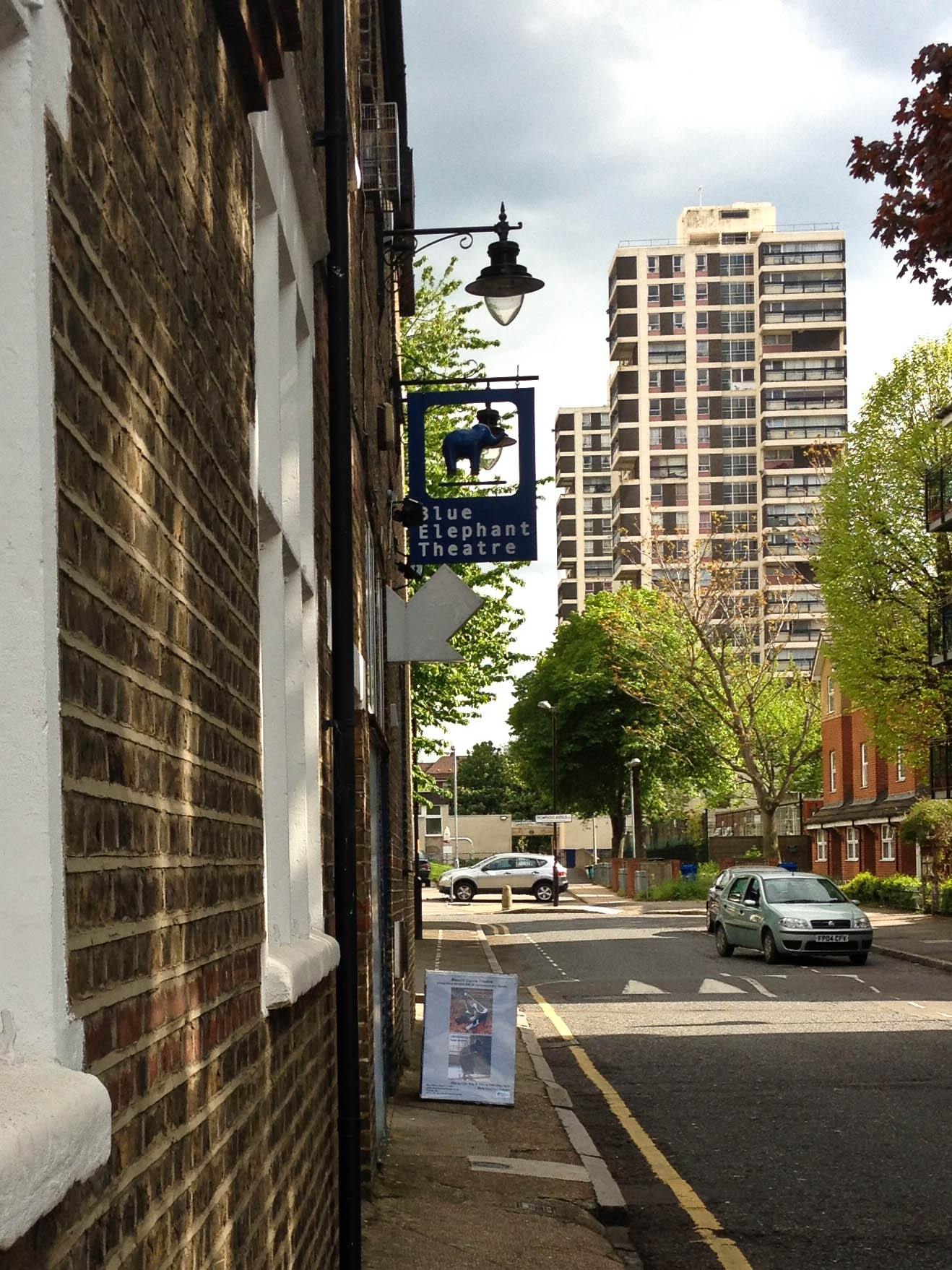
Blue Elephant Theatre

The Blue Elephant Theatre was a 50-seat fringe theatre situated in the borough of Southwark in London. It was established in 1999 by Antonio Ribeiro.

Niamh de Valera and Jo Sadler-Lovett are co-Artistic Directors of Blue Elephant Theatre, jointly programming the theatre's seasons since 2013. The theatre has an eclectic programme, promoting cross-art-form work and all forms of theatre from physical and dance theatre to new writing and classics. Its aim is to nurture new and emerging artists across the performing arts. These have included Mamoru Iriguchi (Evening Standard Best Design Award-winner 2009), Levantes Dance Theatre (Oxford Samuel Beckett Theatre Trust Award-Winner 2009), George Mann received the 2009 Offie for "Best Solo Performer" (''The Stage'') and Paul Morris received the 2009 Off West End Adopt A Playwright award. and Carlos Pons Guerra (nominated for Emerging Artist Award, National Dance Awards 2015).

Jasmine Cullingford preceded de Valera and Sadler-Lovett as artistic director of the theatre. In 2009 Cullingford won the Best Venue Manager award from Fringe Report and in October 2013 the Blue Elephant won the inaugural Southwark Arts Forum Performing Arts Award for work that 'exemplifies the genre'.

== Works by Mervyn Peake ==
The Blue Elephant has forged a reputation for staging little-known works by Mervyn Peake. On Wednesday 4 June 2008 the theatre hosted a talk by Sebastian Peake, son of Mervyn Peake. A script by Mervyn Peake, The Cave, was given a rehearsed reading at the theatre by Flat Pack Productions on 21 June 2009. Following this the Blue Elephant staged the world premiere production of The Cave in October 2010, directed by Aaron Paterson. As part of the Mervyn Peake centenary celebrations (2011) the theatre held a rehearsed reading of Peake's play, Noah's Ark (26 April), a rehearsed reading – a premiere – of his play, Mr Loftus, or A Horse of Air (27 April) and a reading of a selection of poems by Peake (28 April). Following the success of these readings the theatre staged the Theatre Premiere of Noah's Ark which had previously been produced on BBC radio in the 1970s. This production was directed by Mhairi Grealis, who had also staged its rehearsed reading, and it was one of three productions nominated for the 2009 Offie for "Best Production for Young People". On 10 May 2013, the Blue Elephant presented a scratch work-in-progress theatre adaptation of Peake's novella Boy in Darkness, performed by Gareth Murphy.

== Boy in Darkness ==
Following a successful scratch performance, and a work in progress one-hour showing co-directed by Aaron Patterson, Murphy worked upon adapting a further version of Peake's novella Boy in Darkness into a full stage performance, which ran from 11 March to 4 April 2015. The piece adapted and performed by Gareth Murphy, in which he played the Boy, goat, hyena and lamb, as well as a central storytelling character, was at this stage in its process directed by John Walton. It was well received, achieving four stars and being described as "a physical theatre gem" by The Stage, while A Younger Theatre said "Physical eloquence and bold storytelling do justice to Peake's fantasy realm." The production was set to tour the UK in 2016.

== Children in Need Celebrity Choir ==
In 2014, BBC Children in Need approached the Blue Elephant, offering places for eleven young people from the theatre to join the celebrity choir formed by Gareth Malone to record a cover of Avicii's "Wake Me Up". The single was recorded at Abbey Road Studios, and went straight to number one in the UK singles chart when it was released on 9 November. The single achieved a combined chart sales tally of over 120,000 in the seven days following, as well as being the most physically purchased single that week.
