= Wolf Creek (Cave Creek tributary) =

Stream in the American state of Missouri

Coordinates: 38.890587°N 92.586854°W

Wolf Creek is a stream in Cooper County in the U.S. state of Missouri. It is a tributary of Cave Creek.

Wolf Creek was named after an early settler with the last name Wolf.

== See also ==
- List of rivers of Missouri
