= Cave Spring =

Cave Spring or Cave Springs may refer to a location in the United States:

- Cave Springs, Arkansas
- Cave Spring, Georgia
  - Cave Spring Commercial Historic District, Cave Spring, GA, listed on the NRHP in Georgia
  - Cave Spring Residential Historic District, Cave Spring, GA, listed on the NRHP in Georgia
- Cave Springs, Kansas
- Cave Spring (Lexington, Kentucky), listed on the NRHP in Kentucky
- Cave Spring (Kansas City, Missouri), listed on the NRHP in Missouri
- Cave Spring, Oklahoma
- Cave Spring, Virginia

== See also ==
- Subterranean river
