= Caves (beer) =

Dark Belgian beer

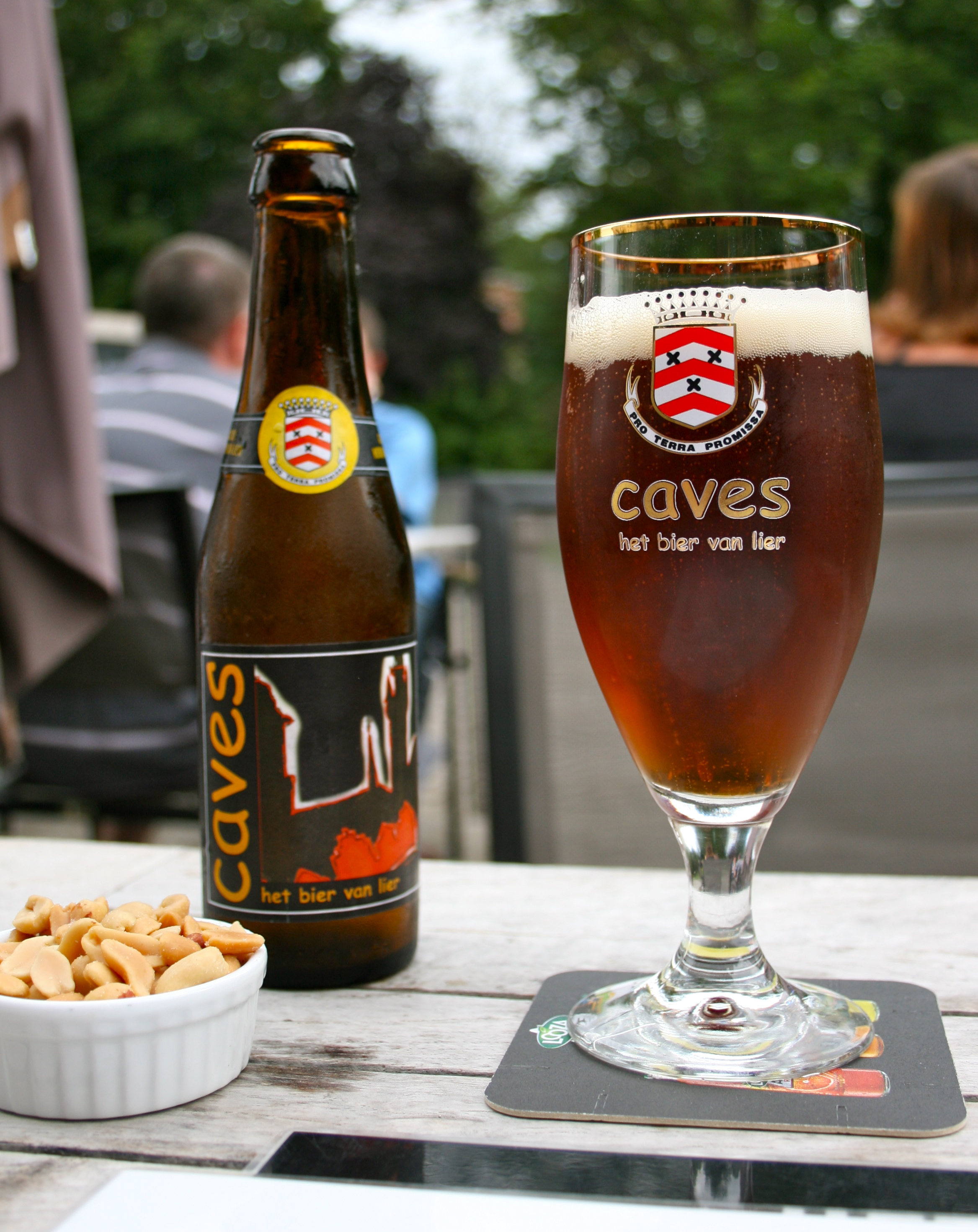
- Type: Dark beer
- Manufacturer: De Heren van Lier
- Country of origin: Belgium
- Introduced: 16th Century
- Ingredients: Grain, malt, hops

Caves is a dark Belgian beer, available around the cities of Lier and Ghent.

Caves has a long history of success and decline. From the 16th century onwards, it was brewed by several breweries around the city of Lier, but when the last brewery Cuykens disappeared in 1967 it seemed that this was also the end of the beer tradition of Caves.

However, in 1976 the cultural organization 'De Heren van Lier' decided to start brewing the beer again.

Caves is a beer of high fermentation, based on grain, malt and hops. No preservatives or sugars are used during the brewing process.
