= Wolf Creek (Duck River tributary) =

Stream in Hickman County, Tennessee, U.S.

Coordinates: 35.8200655°N 87.6880766°W

Wolf Creek is a stream in Hickman County, Tennessee, in the United States. It is a tributary of Duck River.

Wolf Creek was so named from the numerous wolves seen near it by pioneer settlers.

== See also ==
- List of rivers of Tennessee
