= Canton of Les Corbières Méditerranée =

Coordinates: 43.03°N 2.98°E

- Canton
- Situation of the canton of Les Corbières Méditerranée in the department of Aude
- Country: France
- Region: Occitania
- Department: Aude
- No. of communes: {{{nbcomm}}}
- Population (2023): 23,994
- INSEE code: 1117

The canton of Les Corbières Méditerranée (French: canton des Corbières Méditerranée, formerly known as the canton of Sigean) is an administrative division of the Aude department, southern France. Its borders were not modified at the French canton reorganisation which came into effect in March 2015. Its seat is in Sigean.

It consists of the following communes:

1. Caves
2. Feuilla
3. Fitou
4. Leucate
5. La Palme
6. Peyriac-de-Mer
7. Port-la-Nouvelle
8. Portel-des-Corbières
9. Roquefort-des-Corbières
10. Sigean
11. Treilles
