= Portel-des-Corbières =

- Commune
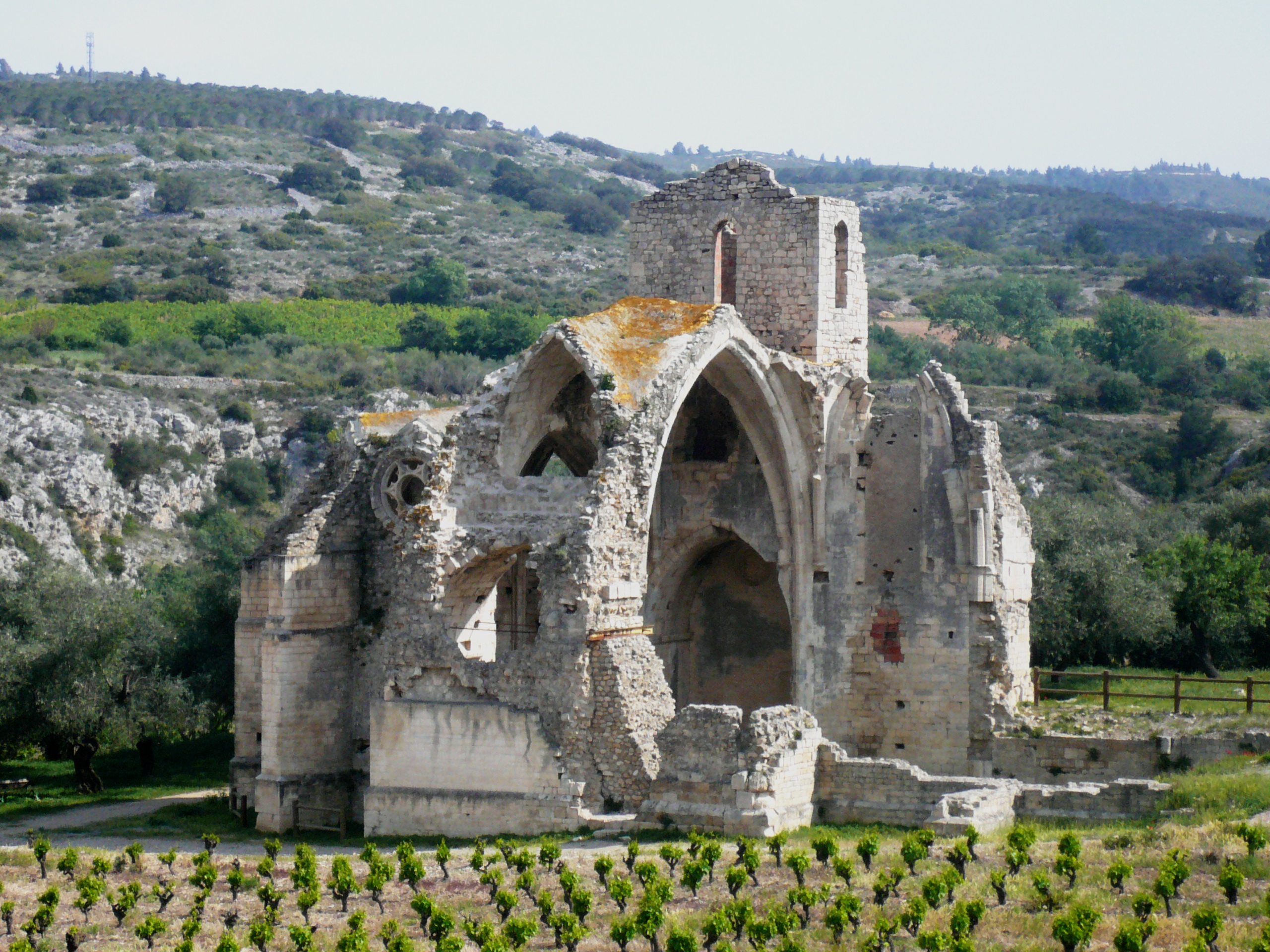
- The church of Notre-Dame des Oubiels in Portel-des-Corbières

- Coat of arms
- Location of Portel-des-Corbières
- Location within France Location within Occitanie
- Coordinates: 43°03′19″N 2°55′22″E
- Country: France
- Region: Occitania
- Department: Aude
- Arrondissement: Narbonne
- Canton: Les Corbières Méditerranée
- Intercommunality: Grand Narbonne

Government
  - Mayor (2020–2026): Bruno Texier
- Area^{1}: 35.1 km^{2} (13.6 sq mi)
- Elevation: 32 m (105 ft)
- Highest elevation: 301 m (988 ft)
- Lowest elevation: 5 m (16 ft)
- Population (2023): 1,279
  - Density: 36.4/km^{2} (94.4/sq mi)
- Time zone: UTC+01:00 (CET)
  - Summer (DST): UTC+02:00 (CEST)
- INSEE/Postal code: 11295 /11490
- ^{1} French Land Register data, which excludes lakes, ponds, glaciers > 1 km^{2} (0.386 sq mi or 247 acres) and river estuaries.

Portel-des-Corbières is a commune in the Aude department in southern France.

== Population ==
Historical population
Year	Pop.	±% p.a.
1968	881	—
1975	836	−0.75%
1982	889	+0.88%
1990	971	+1.11%
1999	1,053	+0.90%
2007	1,125	+0.83%
2012	1,251	+2.15%
2017	1,357	+1.64%
2023	1,279	−0.98%
Source: INSEE

== See also ==
- Corbières AOC
- Communes of the Aude department
