= Wolf Creek (Beech River tributary) =

Stream in Tennessee, U.S.

Coordinates: 35.634237°N 88.415047°W

Wolf Creek is a stream in the U.S. state of Tennessee. It is a tributary to the Beech River.

Wolf Creek was named for the wolves along its course.
