= Édouard Timbal-Lagrave =

French pharmacist and botanist

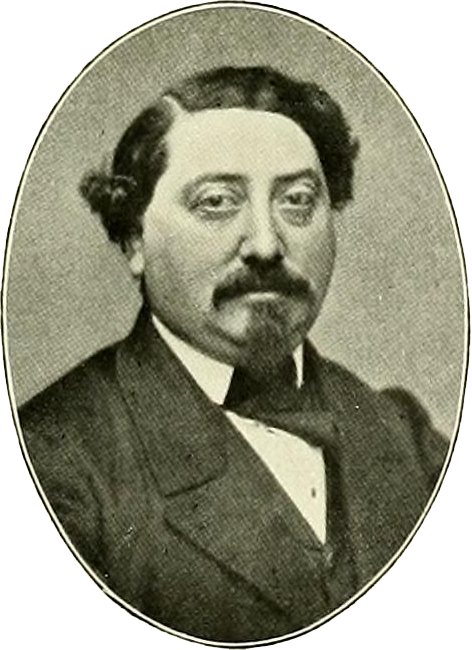
Édouard Timbal-Lagrave

Édouard-Pierre-Marguerite Timbal-Lagrave (4 March 1819, Grisolles – 17 March 1888, Toulouse) was a French pharmacist and botanist. He specialized in the flora of southwestern France, including the Pyrénées and Corbières Massif.

He studied chemistry and pharmacy in Toulouse and Montpellier, subsequently obtaining the degree of pharmacist 1st class. During his career he worked as a pharmacist in Toulouse and served as a substitute professor at the local École de médecine et de pharmacie. In 1854 he became a member of the Société botanique de France.

In 1871 the plant genus Timbalia (family Rosaceae) was named in his honor by Dominique Clos. Reportedly, many of the plants that he described were based on minor local differences, and as such, were later reduced to intraspecific rankings. His herbarium, as well as specimens collected by his son Albert Timbal-Lagrave, is housed at the Jardin botanique Henri Gaussen (TL) in Toulouse.

== Selected works ==
- Recherches sur les cépages cultivés dans les départements de la Haute-Garonne, du Lot, de Tarn-et-Garonne, de l'Aude, de l'Hérault et des Pyrénées Orientales (with Édouard Filhol), 1863 – Research on grapes grown in the departments of Haute-Garonne, Lot, Tarn-et-Garonne, Aude, Hérault and Pyrénées Orientales.
- Précis des herborisations faites par la Société d'histoire naturelle de Toulouse pendant l'année 1870, 1871 – Specific herborizations made by the Natural History Society of Toulouse during the year 1870.
- Une excursion botanique à Cascastel, Durban, et Villeneuve dans les Corbières, 1874 – A botanical excursion in Cascastel, Durban, and Villeneuve in Corbières.
- Deuxième excursion dans les Corbières orientales, Saint-Victor, le col d'Ostrem, Tuchan, Vingrau, 1875 – Second excursion in the eastern Corbières Massif, Saint-Victor, the col of Ostrem, Tuchan, Vingrau.
- Exploration scientifique du massif d'Arbas (Haute-Garonne); with Édouard Filhol and Ernest-Jules-Marie Jeanbernat, 1875 – Scientific exploration of the massif of Arbas.
- Reliquiæ Pourretianæ, 1875.
- Le massif du Laurenti, Pyrénées française : géographie, géologie, botanique (with Ernest Jules Marie Jeanbernat), 1879 – The Laurenti massif, French Pyrénées.
- Essai monographique sur les Dianthus des Pyrénées françaises, 1881 – Monograph on Dianthus of the French Pyrénées.
- Essai monographique sur les espèces françaises du genre Héracleum, 1889 – Monograph on French species within the genus Heracleum.
