= Wolf Creek (Sandusky River tributary) =

Stream in Ohio, U.S.

Coordinates: 41°16′49″N 83°10′05″W

Wolf Creek is a stream in the U.S. state of Ohio. It is a tributary of the Sandusky River.

Wolf Creek was named for the frequent wolves seen by early settlers.

== See also ==
- List of rivers of Ohio
