= The Cave (play) =

Play by Mervyn Peake

- Original language: English
- Written by: Mervyn Peake
- Subject: A family is disturbed by the arrival of an unknown girl.
- Genre: Drama
- Setting: A cave in south west England from the Neolithic period to the "modern day or very near future".

Premiere
- Date: 2010
- Place: London, UK

The Cave is a play written by English novelist and artist Mervyn Peake in the mid-1950s. The play is a three-act drama, which takes place in one cave over three time periods; from the Neolithic period, through medieval to modern day or "the very near future".

In one cave, thousands of years of history are played out. A history marked by conformity and the persecution of anyone who dares to speak out. One family struggles to live their day-to-day lives. Then one day a young girl enters the cave and throws their belief system into question.

This unsettling and powerful play, from the author of Gormenghast, is a dark, inquisitive look at the role of the artist in society, the nature of authority and its effect on the human condition.

The Cave will be published by Methuen in a Mervyn Peake collection in 2011 to celebrate the centenary of Peake's birth.

== Plot ==
=== Act One ===
An ice-age family of moon-worshipping cave dwellers fight off the constant threat of wolves at their cave mouth. When they expect the moon to smite them a girl enters their cave instead. First they mistake her for the body of the moon and offer to worship her; then they decide she is a blasphemer, for she challenges the moon to strike her down. The father and younger son attempt to kill her but she is saved at the last minute by the elder son.

=== Act Two ===
The second act, set in medieval times, opens with the actors in exactly the same positions as at the end of Act I. The elder son, now named Harry, pushes his younger brother, Miles, to the floor and releases his father from his grip. Harry, who drew on the wall of the cave in act one, is now a master sculptor, at work on a gargoyle for the local cathedral. The girl reveals that she is Mary Gray, a suspected witch from a neighbouring village. Soon a witch-hunter, Tom Carter, enters the cave in search of her. Harry knocks her out and hides her behind the carving. Together they conspire to send Tom off on a false trail, but Miles (with his eye on the reward) slips out and brings Tom back. They hear Harry declaring his love to Mary; a fight ensues and the act ends with Harry killing Tom.

=== Act Three ===
In a time when nuclear war is imminent, the cave becomes a bomb-proof shelter. The action takes up where it left off: Harry has just killed an informer, and he struggles to cope with what he has done. Mary now appears to prefer Miles, offering whatever he wants if he will help her hide the body. He asks her to marry him. When their mother enters, they quickly blindfold her, as though for a game, and hide the body. But Harry feels obliged to confess and reveals the corpse in the cocktail cabinet. This breaks down the family ties, and he ends by shooting them all, and himself. Then from the pile of dead bodies Mary rises to pronounce the final words: “O world of strange beliefs innumerable, I cannot die … I cannot die. Death will not have me.”

== Cast of characters ==
- Father/Charles: The father is a figure of authority in the first two acts. His position in act three and with the presence of Tom Carter is more questionable. He is scared of Mary and is immune to her effects until, perhaps, the very end of act three.
- First Son/Harry: Harry is the artist son. He is inspired by and falls in love with Mary. He is her main supporter in the cave. He goes on a long journey of self-discovery in the play as Mary expands his mind and understanding.
- Second Son/Miles: Miles seeks to discover things, inventing tools and weapons for the benefit of mankind, believing them to be cleaner than the creations of art because they are devoid of emotion. But he fails to see how they can be misused.
- Mother: In Act I, she leads the spiritual life of her family; by Act III she is mourning the loss of her younger self and of all faith. “After all we are not in the Stone Age, are we? There are no wolves at the door. But [cavemen] had something to worship. What have I – to take the place of the spirit?” she asks.
- Girl/Mary: Mary embodies the power of the imagination that fires the artist and enables him to create things that have no other use but to move us – but it also leads him to break with social conventions. She is eternal.
- Tom Carter: Tom is a witch-hunter in Act II and an informer in Act III. He represents the perverse pleasure of repressive authority, resisting change and individuality.

== Productions ==
FlatPack Productions staged a dramatic reading of the unpublished play in June 2009 at the Blue Elephant Theatre in Camberwell.

The world premiere of The Cave was directed by Aaron Paterson, also at the Blue Elephant Theatre in October 2010. It starred Sebastian Aguirre as Harry, Diane Axford as Mother, Nick Hoad as Father, Matthew Wade as Tom, Emily Wallis as Mary and Guy Warren-Thomas as Miles.

Reviews were generally positive., with Libby Purves writing of it in The Times that:

It has streaks of the angry postwar nihilism of Anouilh and Sartre: the hopeful theme of rejecting fear and social coercion leads only to amoral fragmentation in the last act. But it is extraordinary: a howl, an imperfect and painful philosophical struggle, part of a remarkable artist's testament. Honour to the little theatre.

== See also ==
- http://www.express.co.uk/posts/view/207711/Review-The-Cave-Blue-Elephant-Theatre#
- thestage.co.uk
- http://www.peakestudies.com/backish.htm
