= Wolf Creek (Beaver Creek tributary) =

Stream in the Ozarks of Missouri, U.S.

Wolf Creek is a stream in Phelps County in the Ozarks of Missouri. It is a tributary of Beaver Creek.

The stream headwaters are at 37°54′56″N 91°46′48″W and the confluence with Beaver Creek is at 37°53′55″N 91°50′26″W.

Wolf Creek was so named on account of wolves in the area.

== See also ==
- List of rivers of Missouri
