= Wolf Creek (Tuque Creek tributary) =

Stream in the American state of Missouri

Coordinates: 38.643662°N 91.019032°W

Wolf Creek is a stream in St. Charles and Warren Counties in the U.S. state of Missouri. It is a tributary of Tuque Creek.

Wolf Creek has the name of Gus Wolf, the original owner of the site.

== See also ==
- List of rivers of Missouri
