= Gianfredo Camesi =

Swiss painter (1940–2025)

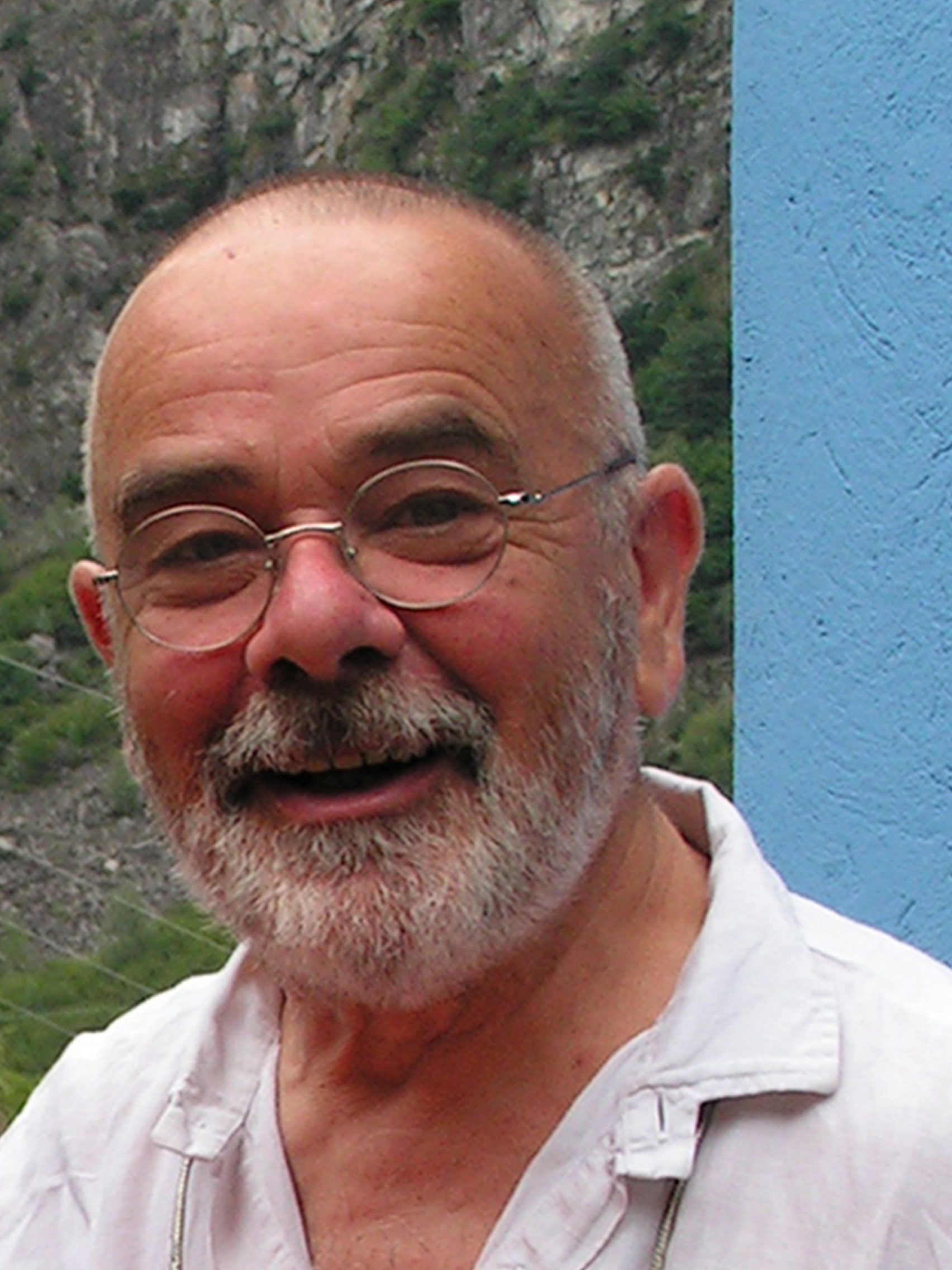
Camesi in 2005

Gianfredo Camesi (24 March 1940 – 18 November 2025) was a Swiss painter.

Camesi moved to Geneva in 1960 where he started experimenting with painting and sculpture. Towards the end of the 1960s, he started his association with the gallery of Renée Ziegler in Zurich and Jan Runnqvist from Galerie Bonnier in Geneva. In 1973, he represented Switzerland at the 12th São Paulo Art Biennial with a series of 400 watercolours and 15 paintings. In 1975, he moved to France before returning to Switzerland where he settled in his native Ticino.

Twenty-seven of his works are part of the collection of the Museo d'Arte della Svizzera Italiana (MASI) in Lugano.

Camesi died on 18 November 2025, at the age of 85.
