= Wolf Creek (Rocky Creek tributary) =

Stream in Georgia, U.S.

Coordinates: 32°50′23.50″N 83°42′33.66″W

Wolf Creek is a stream in the U.S. state of Georgia. It is a tributary to Rocky Creek.

Wolf Creek, most likely named by a surveyor for wolves in the area.
