= Wolf Creek (South Grand River tributary) =

Stream in the U.S. state of Missouri

Wolf Creek is a stream in Cass County in the U.S. state of Missouri. It is a tributary of the East Branch South Grand River. The stream headwaters arise approximately one mile west of Peculiar at 38°43′25″N 94°28′37″W and it flows southeast for about four miles to its confluence with the East Branch just north of Missouri Route 2 about 2.5 miles west of Harrisonville at 38°40′34″N 94°25′31″W.

Wolf Creek was named due to the presence of wolves along its course.

== See also ==
- List of rivers of Missouri
