= Wolf Creek Research Basin =

Wolf Creek is in the Yukon Territory, Canada.

== Research station ==
A research station at Wolf Creek Research Basin has been providing continuous data since 1992 for hydrological data. There are three meteorological stations, a groundwater monitoring well since 2003, as well as specialized instrumentation running continuously for specific projects.

It is an important location for the study of snow and climate in the region.
