= Peyriac-de-Mer =

Commune in Occitanie, France

- Commune
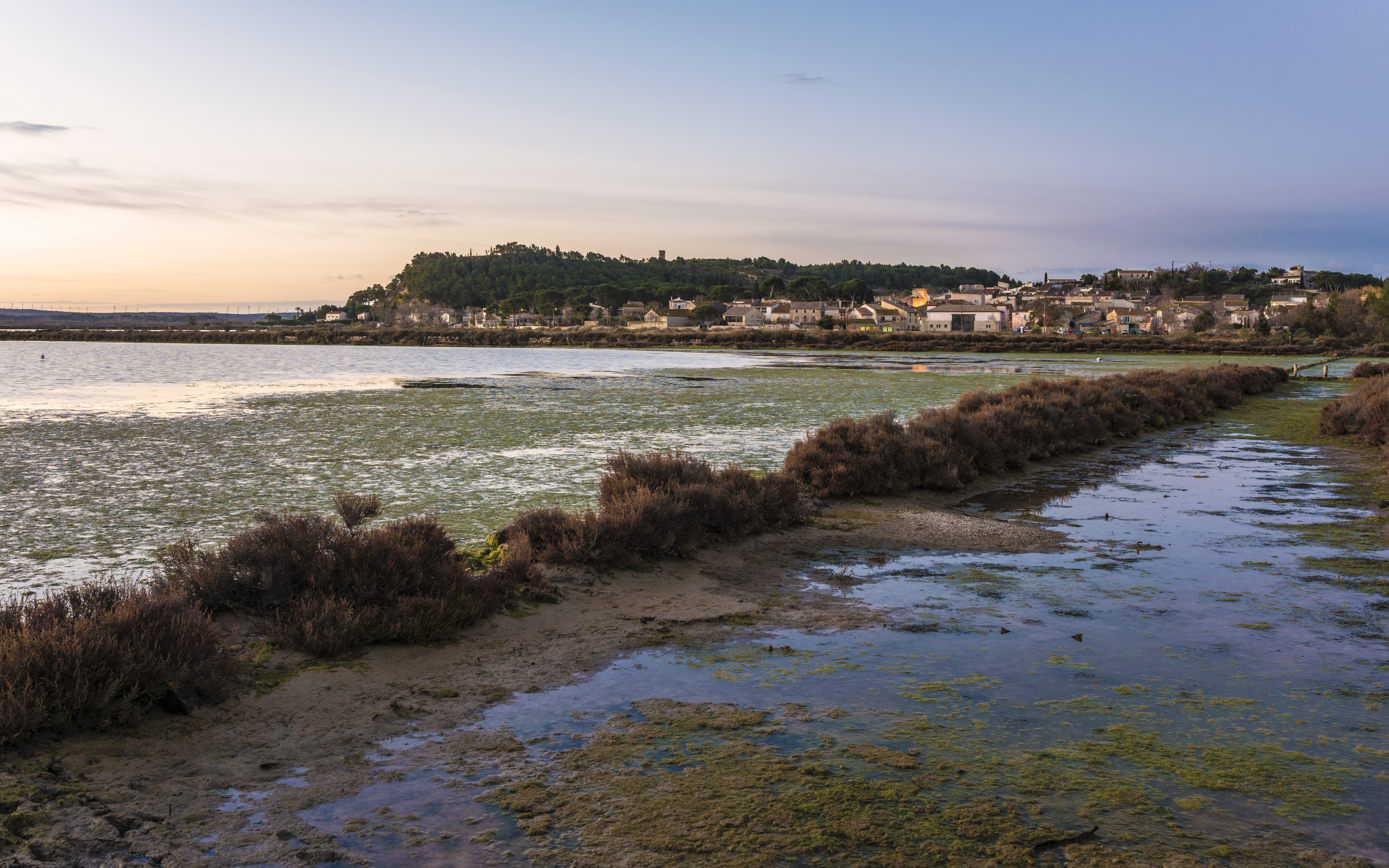
- A general view of Peyriac-de-Mer

- Coat of arms
- Location of Peyriac-de-Mer
- Location within France Location within Occitanie
- Coordinates: 43°05′16″N 2°57′31″E
- Country: France
- Region: Occitania
- Department: Aude
- Arrondissement: Narbonne
- Canton: Les Corbières Méditerranée
- Intercommunality: Grand Narbonne

Government
  - Mayor (2020–2026): Catherine Gouiry
- Area^{1}: 26.92 km^{2} (10.39 sq mi)
- Elevation: 5 m (16 ft)
- Highest elevation: 285 m (935 ft)
- Lowest elevation: 0 m (0 ft)
- Population (2023): 1,187
  - Density: 44.09/km^{2} (114.2/sq mi)
- Time zone: UTC+01:00 (CET)
  - Summer (DST): UTC+02:00 (CEST)
- INSEE/Postal code: 11285 /11440
- ^{1} French Land Register data, which excludes lakes, ponds, glaciers > 1 km^{2} (0.386 sq mi or 247 acres) and river estuaries.

Peyriac-de-Mer (French pronunciation: [peʁjak də mɛʁ], literally Peyriac of Sea; Occitan: Peiriac de Mar) is a commune in the Aude department in southern France.

== Population ==
Historical population
Year	Pop.	±% p.a.
1968	829	—
1975	765	−1.14%
1982	727	−0.73%
1990	822	+1.55%
1999	828	+0.08%
2007	1,025	+2.70%
2012	1,076	+0.98%
2017	1,113	+0.68%
2023	1,187	+1.08%
Source: INSEE

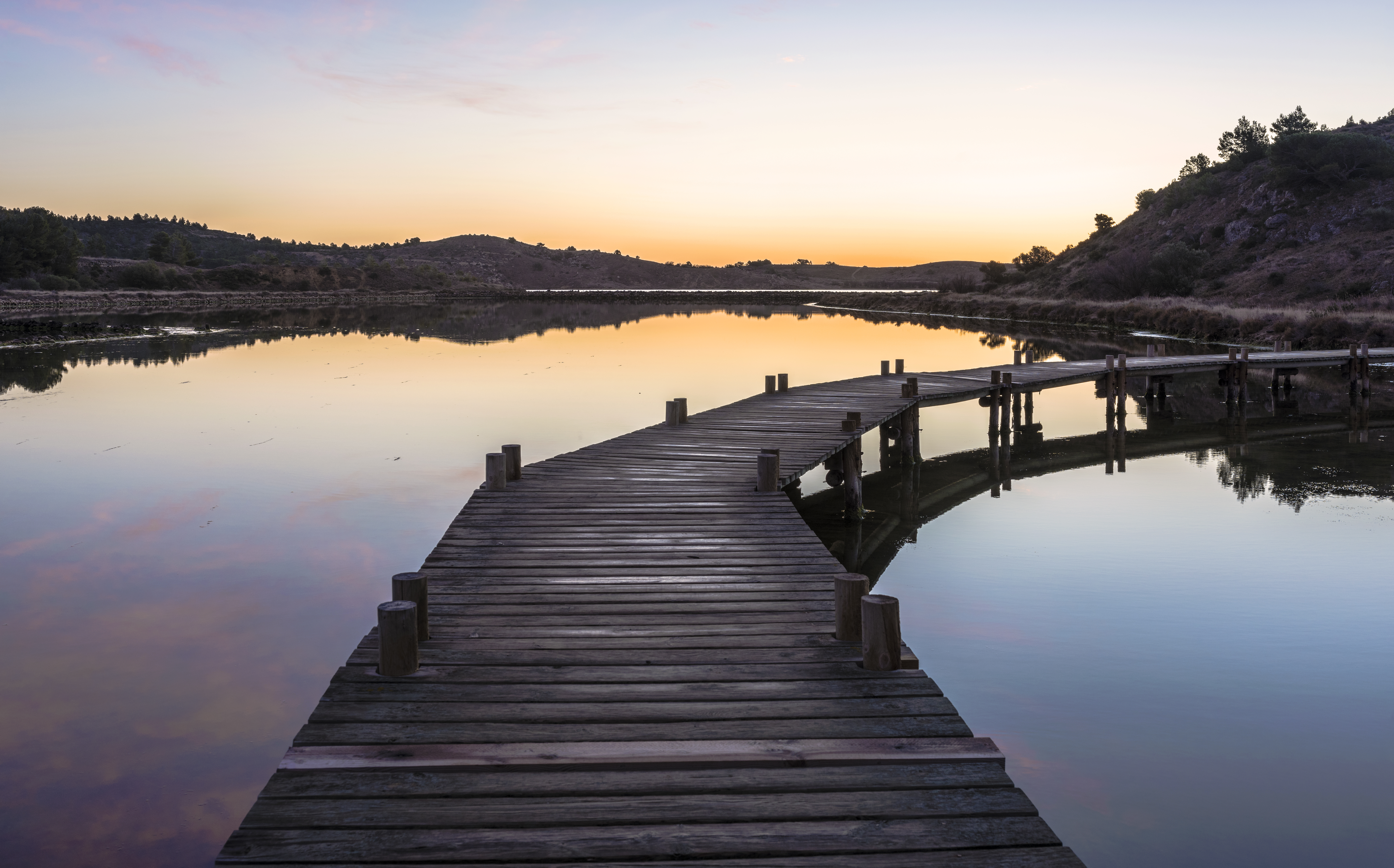
Landscape in the former salt ponds of the commune

== See also ==
- Corbières AOC
- Communes of the Aude department
