= Wolf Creek Reservoir =

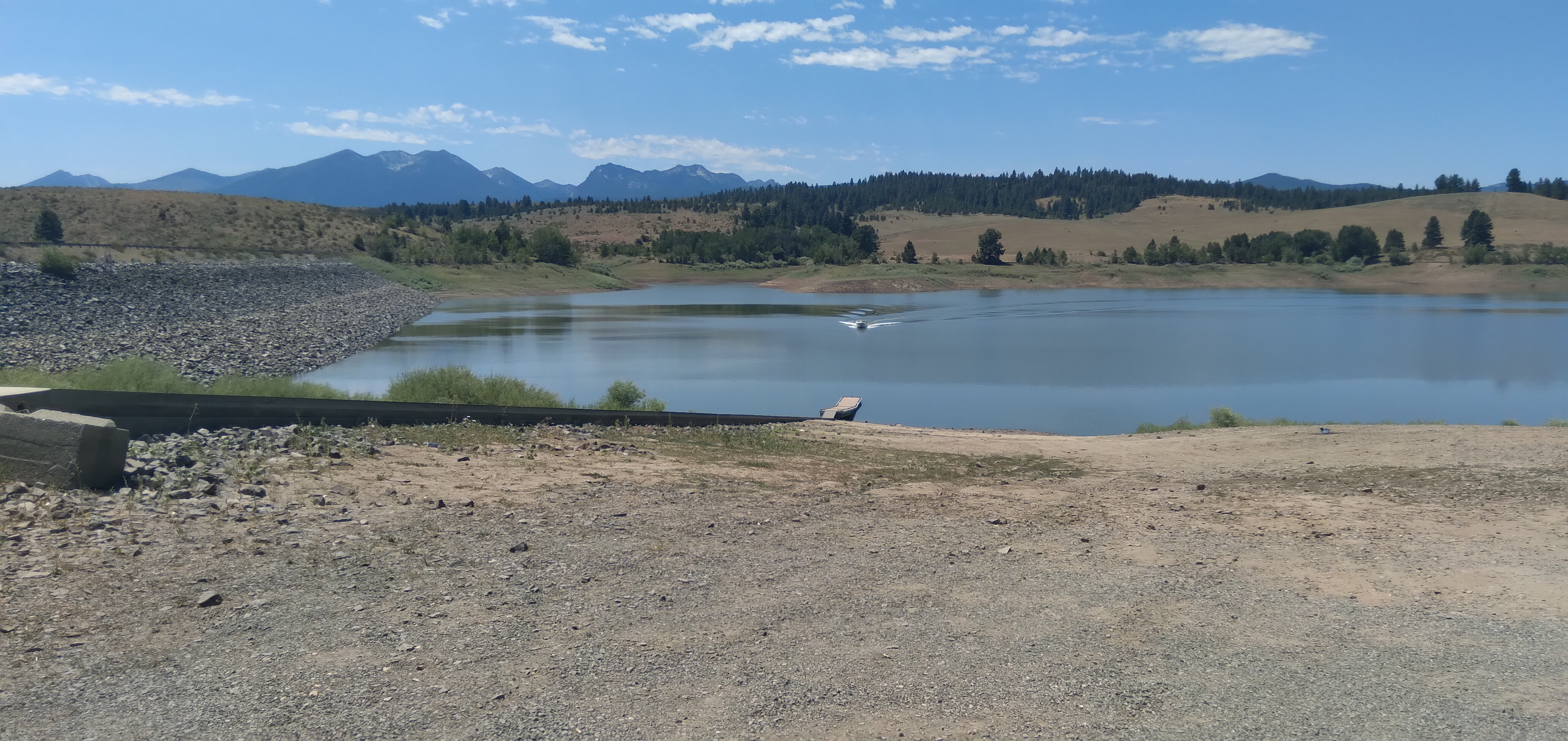
- Wolf Creek Reservoir at dam location

- Location within Oregon Location within the United States Location within North America
- Location: Union Co. Oregon, United States
- Coordinates: 45.0568019°N 118.0250428°W
- Type: Reservoir

Wolf Creek Reservoir is a 230-acre (93 ha) impoundment located within the Elkhorn Mountains in eastern Oregon. The water is relatively clear and provides good trout fishing. The reservoir is located north of Haines and is fed by Wolf Creek from the Elkhorn Mountains in the Powder River basin. It is one of two existing water storage sites of the North Powder River with a storage capacity of 10,800 acre-feet.
