= Hardy Run =

Stream in West Virginia, US

Coordinates: 37°39′07″N 80°37′24″W

Hardy Run is a stream in the U.S. state of West Virginia.

Hardy Run bears the name of an early settler.

== See also ==
- List of rivers of West Virginia
