= Cave Hill =

The names Cave Hill and Cavehill refer to a number of places:

== Barbados ==
- Cave Hill, Saint Lucy, Barbados
- Cave Hill, Saint Michael, Barbados
  - University of the West Indies at Cave Hill

== Northern Ireland ==
- Cave Hill or Cavehill, a basaltic hill overlooking the city of Belfast in Northern Ireland

== United States ==
=== Kentucky ===
- Cave Hill Cemetery in Louisville, Kentucky

=== South Dakota ===
- Cave Hills National Forest, in Harding County, South Dakota

=== Virginia ===
- Cave Hill Natural Area Preserve in Augusta County, Virginia
- Cave Hill, Page County, Virginia, site of Luray Caverns
- Cave Hill, Wythe County, Virginia, near Speedwell, Virginia
- Cave Hill Farm, in McGaheysville, Virginia
