= Caves, Aude =

Commune in Occitanie, France

Caves
- Commune
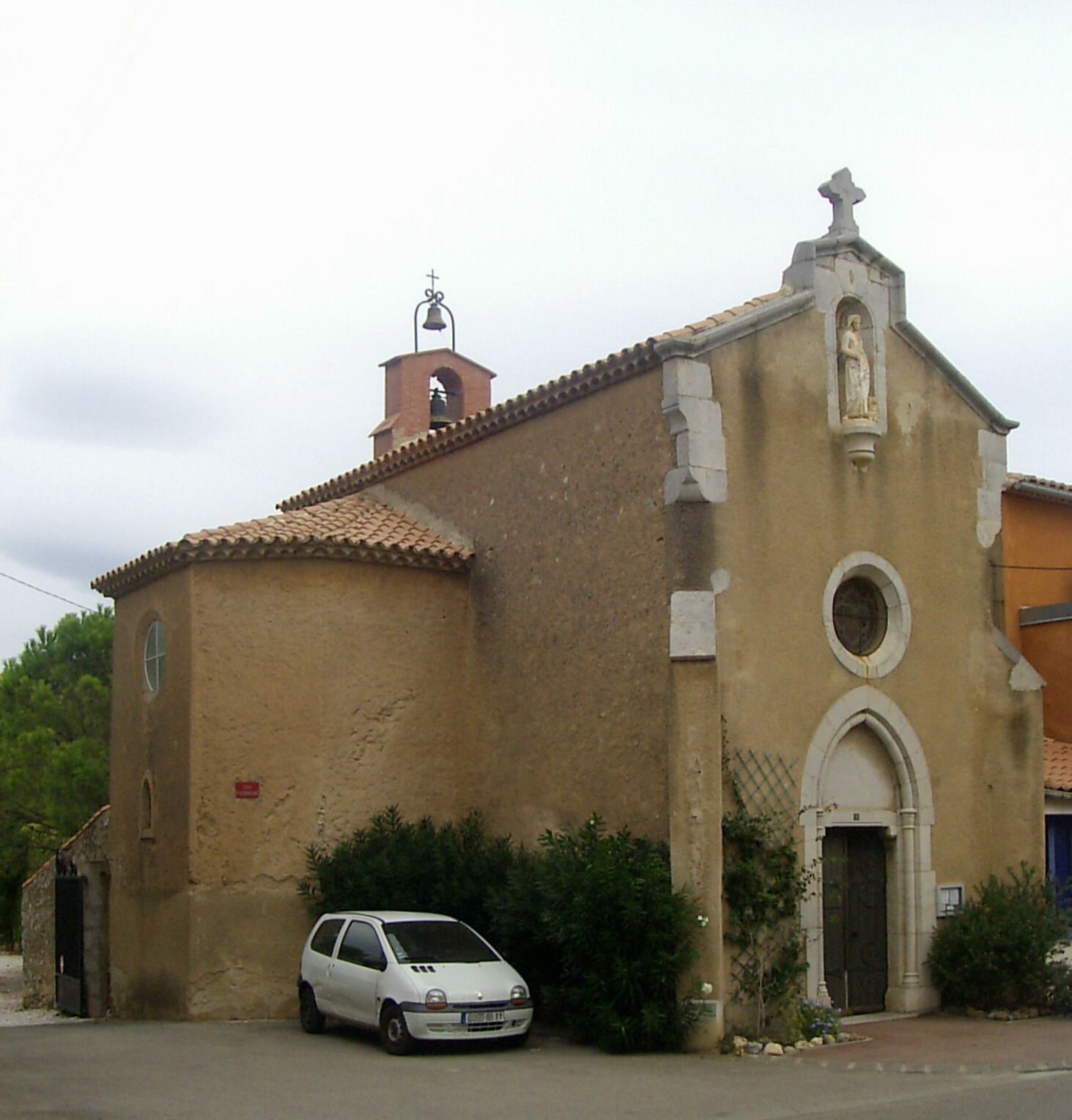
- The church in Caves

- Coat of arms
- Location of Caves
- Location within France Location within Occitanie
- Coordinates: 42°55′55″N 2°58′38″E
- Country: France
- Region: Occitania
- Department: Aude
- Arrondissement: Narbonne
- Canton: Les Corbières Méditerranée
- Intercommunality: Grand Narbonne

Government
  - Mayor (2020–2026): Bernard Devic
- Area^{1}: 9.13 km^{2} (3.53 sq mi)
- Elevation: 29 m (95 ft)
- Highest elevation: 209 m (686 ft)
- Lowest elevation: 13 m (43 ft)
- Population (2023): 875
  - Density: 95.8/km^{2} (248/sq mi)
- Time zone: UTC+01:00 (CET)
  - Summer (DST): UTC+02:00 (CEST)
- INSEE/Postal code: 11086 /11510
- ^{1} French Land Register data, which excludes lakes, ponds, glaciers > 1 km^{2} (0.386 sq mi or 247 acres) and river estuaries.

Caves (French pronunciation: [kav]; Occitan: Las Cavas) is a commune in the Aude department in southern France, it extends over an area of 9.13 km^{2}.

== Population ==
Historical population
Year	Pop.	±% p.a.
1968	252	—
1975	231	−1.24%
1982	228	−0.19%
1990	280	+2.60%
1999	357	+2.74%
2007	588	+6.44%
2012	780	+5.81%
2017	875	+2.33%
2023	875	+0.00%
Source: INSEE

== See also ==
- Fitou AOC
- Corbières AOC
- Communes of the Aude department
