= Wolf Creek (Taney County, Missouri) =

Stream in the American state of Missouri

Wolf Creek is a stream in Taney County, Missouri. The headwaters are in the Mark Twain National Forest on the southwest flank of Lime Kiln Mountain. The stream flows northwest and enters Bull Shoals Lake adjacent to Cedar Creek.

The stream source is at 36°35′08″N 92°59′01″W and the confluence is at 36°37′30″N 93°01′53″W.

A variant name was "Wolfs Branch". The creek has the name of the local Wolf family.

== See also ==
- List of rivers of Missouri
