= Wolf Creek (Thompson River tributary) =

Stream in the U.S. state of Missouri

Coordinates: 40.021402°N 93.631884°W

Wolf Creek is a stream in Grundy County in the U.S. state of Missouri. It is a tributary of the Thompson River.

Wolf Creek most likely was named for the wolves encountered there by pioneers.

== See also ==
- List of rivers of Missouri
