= Villeneuve-les-Corbières =

Commune in Occitanie, France

- Commune
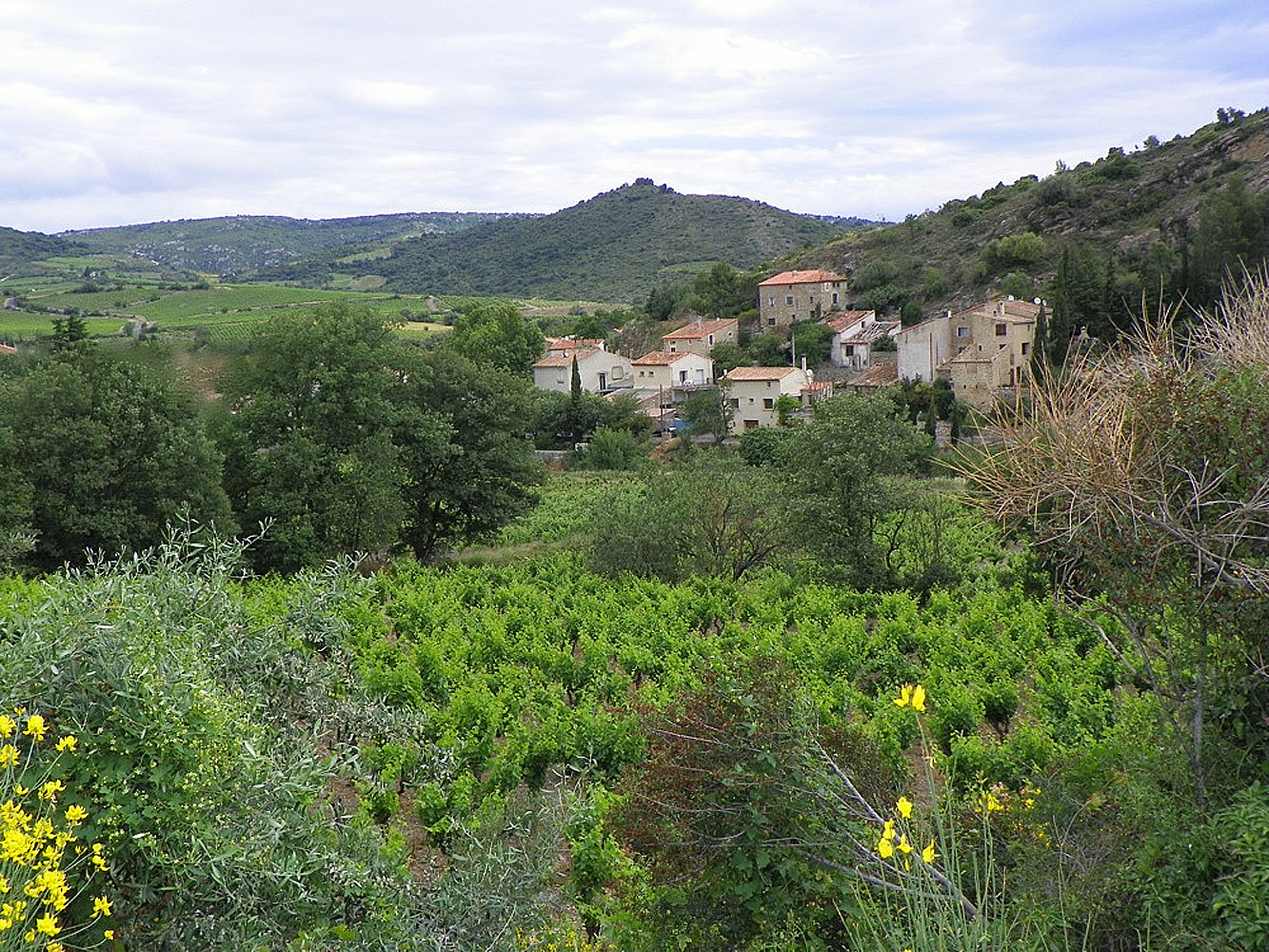
- A general view of Villeneuve-les-Corbières

- Coat of arms
- Location of Villeneuve-les-Corbières
- Location within France Location within Occitanie
- Coordinates: 42°58′42″N 2°46′34″E
- Country: France
- Region: Occitania
- Department: Aude
- Arrondissement: Narbonne
- Canton: Les Corbières

Government
  - Mayor (2020–2026): Alain Izard
- Area^{1}: 24.31 km^{2} (9.39 sq mi)
- Elevation: 130 m (430 ft)
- Highest elevation: 418 m (1,371 ft)
- Lowest elevation: 109 m (358 ft)
- Population (2023): 253
  - Density: 10.4/km^{2} (27.0/sq mi)
- Time zone: UTC+01:00 (CET)
  - Summer (DST): UTC+02:00 (CEST)
- INSEE/Postal code: 11431 /11360
- ^{1} French Land Register data, which excludes lakes, ponds, glaciers > 1 km^{2} (0.386 sq mi or 247 acres) and river estuaries.

Villeneuve-les-Corbières (French pronunciation: [vilnœv le kɔʁbjɛʁ]; Occitan: Vilanava de las Corbièras) is a commune in the Aude department in southern France.

== Geography ==
It is on the scenic road D611, between Durban-Corbières and Tuchan, in the hills of the Corbières Massif.

== Population ==
Historical population
Year	Pop.	±% p.a.
1968	276	—
1975	249	−1.46%
1982	219	−1.82%
1990	231	+0.67%
1999	240	+0.43%
2007	275	+1.72%
2012	276	+0.07%
2017	242	−2.59%
2023	253	+0.74%
Source: INSEE

== Wines of Villeneuve-les-Corbières ==
- Cave Pilote Gerard Ploy
- Château l'Espigne
- Chateau Lahore-Bergez Earl
- Domaine Lerys

== See also ==
- Fitou AOC
- Corbières AOC
- Communes of the Aude department
