= Cave City =

Cave City can refer to some places in the United States:

- Cave City, Arkansas
- Cave City, California
- Cave City, Kentucky
- Cave City, Missouri
