= Cave Spring Commercial Historic District =

Historic district in Georgia, United States

- U.S. National Register of Historic Places
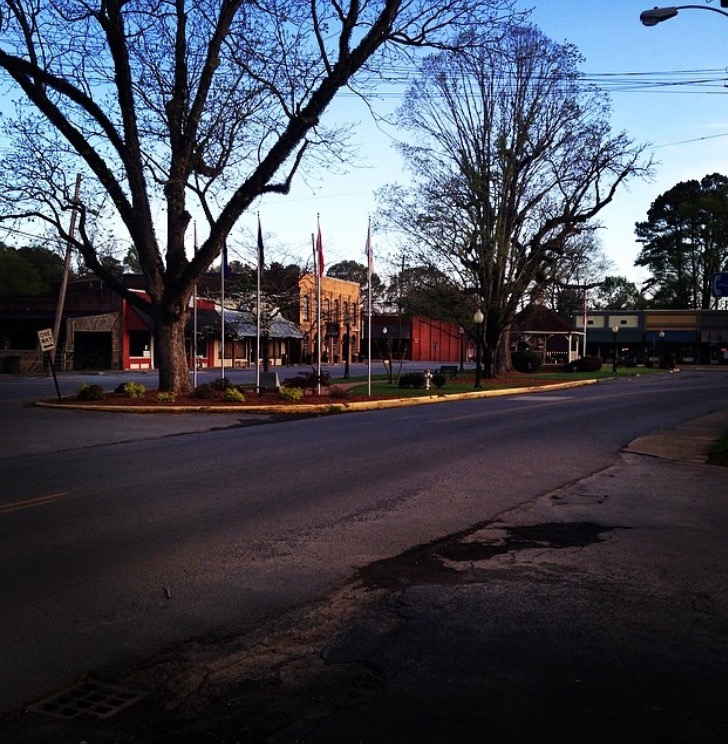

- Location within Georgia
- Location: Alabama, Rome and Cedartown Rds., Broad and Padlock Sts., Cave Spring, Georgia
- Coordinates: 34°06′27″N 85°20′11″W
- Area: 6 acres (2.4 ha)
- Architectural style: Early Commercial, Greek Revival
- MPS: Cave Spring MRA
- NRHP reference No.: 80001028
- Added to NRHP: June 19, 1980

The Cave Spring Commercial Historic District in Cave Spring, Georgia is a 6 acres (2.4 ha) historic district which was listed on the National Register of Historic Places in 1980. The listing included 12 contributing buildings and a contributing site.

It includes the intersections of Alabama Road, Broad Street, Rome Road, Cedartown Road, and Padlock Street, and extends about a block in each direction.
