= Wolf Creek, Ohio =

Unincorporated community in Ohio, U.S.

Coordinates: 39°28′46″N 81°43′55″W

Wolf Creek is an unincorporated community in Washington County, in the U.S. state of Ohio.

== History ==
An old variant name was Wolf Creek Mills. The namesake Wolf Creek mill was a gristmill built in 1789 on Wolf Creek. A post office called Wolf Creek was established in 1888, and remained in operation until 1903.
