= Cave Creek (Boone County) =

Subterranean river in the U.S. state of Missouri

Coordinates: 38°52′04″N 92°19′16″W

Cave Creek is a subterranean river in Boone County in the U.S. state of Missouri. The area of the stream is just west of Missouri Route 163 and about one half mile northwest of Pierpont.

Cave Creek was named for the fact it flows through a cave. It is located in Rock Bridge State Park.

== See also ==
- List of rivers of Missouri
