= Cave Creek (Petite Saline Creek tributary) =

Stream in the U.S. state of Missouri

Cave Creek is a stream in Cooper County in the U.S. state of Missouri. It is a tributary of Petite Saline Creek.

The stream headwaters arise at 38°49′23″N 92°35′27″W at an elevation of 870 feet and approximately one-half mile north of Prairie Home. The stream flows to the north-northwest for about four miles and then turns to the northeast. It continues to the northeast for about three miles to its confluence with the Petite Saline Creek near Gooch Mill. The confluence is at 38°53′45″N 92°34′53″W and an elevation of 577 feet.

Cave Creek was named for a cave on a bluff above its course.

== See also ==
- List of rivers of Missouri
