= 2012 phenomenon =

Eschatological beliefs about the year

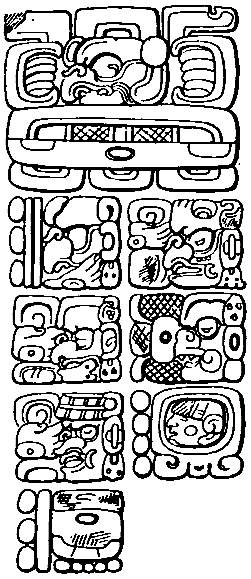
A date inscription in the Maya Long Count on the east side of Stela C from Quirigua showing the date for the last Creation. It is read as 13.0.0.0.0 4 Ahau 8 Kumku and is usually correlated as 11 or 13 August, 3114 BC on the Proleptic Gregorian calendar. The date of 13.0.0.0.0 4 Ahau 3 Kʼankʼin is usually correlated as 21 or 23 December 2012.

The 2012 phenomenon was a range of eschatological beliefs that cataclysmic or transformative events would occur on or around 21 December 2012. This date was regarded as the end-date of a 5,126-year-long cycle in the Mesoamerican Long Count calendar, and festivities took place on 21 December 2012 to commemorate the event in the countries that were part of the Maya civilization (Mexico, Belize, Guatemala, Honduras and El Salvador), with main events at Chichén Itzá in Mexico and Tikal in Guatemala.

Various astronomical alignments and numerological formulae were proposed for this date. A New Age interpretation held that the date marked the start of a period during which Earth and its inhabitants would undergo a positive physical or spiritual transformation, and that 21 December 2012 would mark the beginning of a new era. Others suggested that the date marked the end of the world or a similar catastrophe. Scenarios suggested for the end of the world included the arrival of the next solar maximum; an interaction between Earth and Sagittarius A*, the supermassive black hole at the center of the Milky Way Galaxy; the Nibiru cataclysm, in which Earth would collide with a mythical planet called Nibiru; or even the heating of Earth's core.

Scholars from various disciplines quickly dismissed predictions of cataclysmic events as they arose. Mayan scholars stated that no classic Mayan accounts forecast impending doom, and the idea that the Long Count calendar ends in 2012 misrepresented Mayan history and culture. Astronomers rejected the various proposed doomsday scenarios as pseudoscience, having been refuted by elementary astronomical observations.

== Mesoamerican Long Count calendar ==
December 2012 marked the conclusion of a bʼakʼtun—a time period in the Mesoamerican Long Count calendar, used in Mesoamerica prior to the arrival of Europeans. Although the Long Count was most likely invented by the Olmec, it has become closely associated with the Maya civilization, whose classic period lasted from 250 to 900 AD. The writing system of the classic Maya has been substantially deciphered, meaning that a text corpus of their written and inscribed material has survived from before the Spanish conquest of Yucatán.

Unlike the 260-day tzolkʼin which is still used today among the Maya, the Long Count was linear rather than cyclical, and kept time roughly in units of 20: 20 days made a uinal, 18 uinals (360 days) made a tun, 20 tuns made a kʼatun, and 20 kʼatuns (144,000 days or roughly 394 years) made up a bʼakʼtun. Thus, the Maya date of 8.3.2.10.15 represents 8 bʼakʼtuns, 3 kʼatuns, 2 tuns, 10 uinals and 15 days.

=== Apocalypse ===
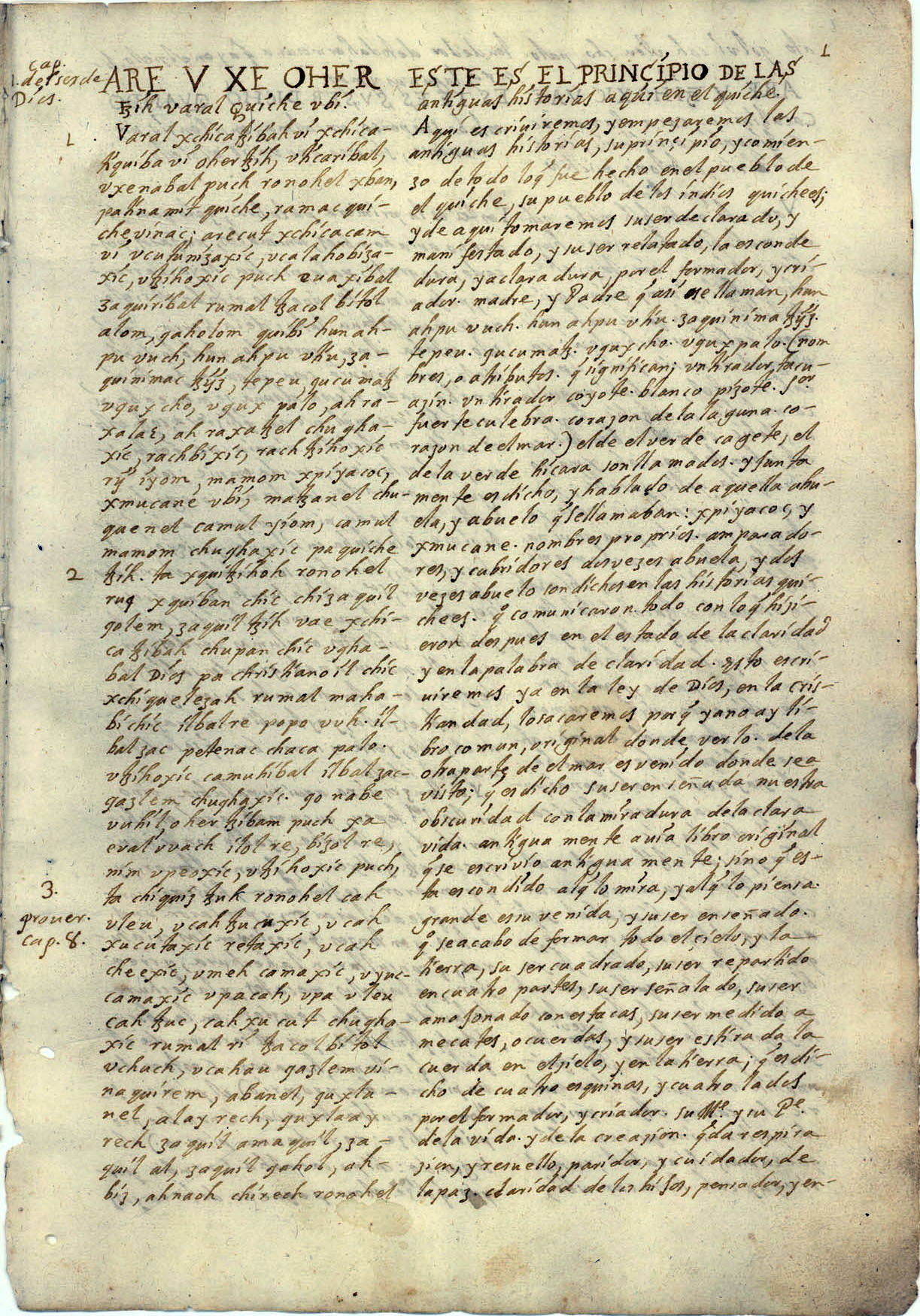
The oldest surviving manuscript of the Popol Vuh, dated to 1701

There is a strong tradition of "world ages" in Maya literature, but the record has been distorted, leaving several possibilities open to interpretation. According to the Popol Vuh, a compilation of the creation accounts of the Kʼicheʼ Maya of the Colonial-era highlands, the current world is the fourth. The Popol Vuh describes the gods first creating three failed worlds, followed by a successful fourth world in which humanity was placed. In the Maya Long Count, the previous world ended after 13 bʼakʼtuns, or roughly 5,125 years. (Note: The number 13 plays an important role in Mesoamerican calendrics; the tzolkʼin, or sacred calendar, was divided into 13 months of 20 days each. The Mayan may cycle consisted of 13 kʼatuns. The reason for the number's importance is uncertain, though correlations to the phases of the moon and to the human gestation period have been suggested.) The Long Count's "zero date" (Note: The Mayan calendar, unlike the Western calendar, used a zero.) (Note: Rather than "0.0.0.0.0", the Mayan Long Count represented the date of creation as "13.0.0.0.0") was set at a point in the past marking the end of the third world and the beginning of the current one, which corresponds to 11 August 3114 BC in the proleptic Gregorian calendar. This means that the fourth world reached the end of its 13th bʼakʼtun, or Maya date 13.0.0.0.0, on 21 December 2012. (Note: Most Mayanist scholars, such as Mark Van Stone and Anthony Aveni, adhere to the "GMT (Goodman-Martinez-Thompson) correlation" with the Long Count, which places the start date at 11 August 3114 BC and the end date of bʼakʼtun 13 at 21 December 2012. This date was also the overwhelming preference of those who believed in 2012 eschatology, arguably, Van Stone suggests, because it was a solstice, and was thus astrologically significant. Some Mayanist scholars, such as Michael D. Coe, Linda Schele and Marc Zender, adhere to the "Lounsbury/GMT+2" correlation, which sets the start date at 13 August and the end date at 23 December. Which of these is the precise correlation has yet to be conclusively settled.) In 1957, Mayanist and astronomer Maud Worcester Makemson wrote that "the completion of a Great Period of 13 bʼakʼtuns would have been of the utmost significance to the Maya." In 1966, Michael D. Coe wrote in The Maya that "there is a suggestion ... that Armageddon would overtake the degenerate peoples of the world and all creation on the final day of the 13th [bʼakʼtun]. Thus ... our present universe [would] be annihilated ... when the Great Cycle of the Long Count reaches completion." (Note: Coe's initial date was "24 December 2011". He revised it to "11 January AD 2013" in the 1980 2nd edition of his book, not settling on 23 December 2012 until the 1984 3rd edition. The correlation of bʼakʼtun 13 as 21 December 2012 first appeared in Table B.2 of Robert J. Sharer's 1983 revision of the 4th edition of Sylvanus Morley's book The Ancient Maya. (Morley 1983, p. 603, Table B2).)

=== Objections ===
Coe's interpretation was repeated by other scholars through the early 1990s. In contrast, later researchers said that, while the end of the 13th bʼakʼtun would perhaps be a cause for celebration, it did not mark the end of the calendar. "There is nothing in the Maya or Aztec or ancient Mesoamerican prophecy to suggest that they prophesied a sudden or major change of any sort in 2012," said Mayanist scholar Mark Van Stone. "The notion of a 'Great Cycle' coming to an end is completely a modern invention." In 1990, Mayanist scholars Linda Schele and David Freidel argued that the Maya "did not conceive this to be the end of creation, as many have suggested". Susan Milbrath, curator of Latin American Art and Archaeology at the Florida Museum of Natural History, stated that, "We have no record or knowledge that [the Maya] would think the world would come to an end" in 2012. Sandra Noble, executive director of the Foundation for the Advancement of Mesoamerican Studies, said, "For the ancient Maya, it was a huge celebration to make it to the end of a whole cycle," and, "The 2012 phenomenon is a complete fabrication and a chance for a lot of people to cash in." "There will be another cycle," said E. Wyllys Andrews V, director of the Tulane University Middle American Research Institute. "We know the Maya thought there was one before this, and that implies they were comfortable with the idea of another one after this." Commenting on the new calendar found at Xultún, one archaeologist said "The ancient Maya predicted the world would continue—that 7,000 years from now, things would be exactly like this. We keep looking for endings. The Maya were looking for a guarantee that nothing would change. It's an entirely different mindset."

Several prominent individuals representing Maya of Guatemala decried the suggestion that the world would end with the 13th bʼakʼtun. Ricardo Cajas, president of the Colectivo de Organizaciones Indígenas de Guatemala, said the date did not represent an end of humanity but that the new cycle "supposes changes in human consciousness". Martín Sacalxot, of the office of Guatemala's Human Rights Ombudsman (Procurador de los Derechos Humanos), said that the end of the calendar has nothing to do with the end of the world or the year 2012.

=== Prior associations ===
The European association of the Maya with eschatology dates back to the time of Christopher Columbus, who was compiling a work called Libro de las profecías during the voyage in 1502 when he first heard about the "Maia" on Guanaja, an island off the north coast of Honduras. Influenced by the writings of Bishop Pierre d'Ailly, Columbus believed that his discovery of "most distant" lands (and, by extension, the Maya themselves) was prophesied and would bring about the Apocalypse. End-times fears were widespread during the early years of the Spanish Conquest as the result of popular astrological predictions in Europe of a second Great Flood for the year 1524.

In the 1900s, German scholar Ernst Förstemann interpreted the last page of the Dresden Codex as a representation of the end of the world in a cataclysmic flood. He made reference to the destruction of the world and an apocalypse, though he made no reference to the 13th bʼakʼtun or 2012 and it was not clear that he was referring to a future event. His ideas were repeated by archaeologist Sylvanus Morley, who directly paraphrased Förstemann and added his own embellishments, writing, "Finally, on the last page of the manuscript, is depicted the Destruction of the World ... Here, indeed, is portrayed with a graphic touch the final all-engulfing cataclysm" in the form of a great flood. These comments were later repeated in Morley's book, The Ancient Maya, the first edition of which was published in 1946.

== Maya references to bʼakʼtun 13 ==
It is not certain what significance the classic Maya gave to the 13th bʼakʼtun. Most classic Maya inscriptions are strictly historical and do not make any prophetic declarations. Two items in the Maya classical corpus do mention the end of the 13th bʼakʼtun: Tortuguero Monument 6 and La Corona Hieroglyphic Stairway 12.

=== Tortuguero ===
The Tortuguero site, which lies in southernmost Tabasco, Mexico, dates from the 7th century AD and consists of a series of inscriptions mostly in honor of the contemporary ruler Bahlam Ahau. One inscription, known as Tortuguero Monument 6, is the only inscription known to refer to bʼakʼtun 13 in any detail. It has been partially defaced; Sven Gronemeyer and Barbara MacLeod have given this translation:

tzuhtzjo꞉m uy-u꞉xlaju꞉n pik
chan ajaw u꞉x uni꞉w
uhto꞉m il[?]
yeʼni/ye꞉n bolon yokte'
ta chak joyaj

Translation:

It will be completed the 13th bʼakʼtun.
It is 4 Ajaw 3 Kʼankʼin
and it will happen a 'seeingʼ[?].
It is the display of Bʼolon-Yokte'
in a great "investiture".

The Tortuguero monument connects the end of the 13th bʼakʼtun with the appearance of Bʼolon Yokteʼ Kʼuh, shown here on the Vase of Seven Gods.

Very little is known about the god Bʼolon Yokteʼ. According to an article by Mayanists Markus Eberl and Christian Prager in British Anthropological Reports, his name is composed of the elements "nine", ʼOK-teʼ (the meaning of which is unknown), and "god". Confusion in classical period inscriptions suggests that the name was already ancient and unfamiliar to contemporary scribes. He also appears in inscriptions from Palenque, Usumacinta, and La Mar as a god of war, conflict, and the underworld. In one stele he is portrayed with a rope tied around his neck, and in another with an incense bag, together signifying a sacrifice to end a cycle of years.

Based on observations of modern Maya rituals, Gronemeyer and MacLeod claim that the stela refers to a celebration in which a person portraying Bolon Yokteʼ Kʼuh was wrapped in ceremonial garments and paraded around the site. They note that the association of Bolon Yokteʼ Kʼuh with bʼakʼtun 13 appears to be so important on this inscription that it supersedes more typical celebrations such as "erection of stelae, scattering of incense" and so forth. Furthermore, they assert that this event was indeed planned for 2012 and not the 7th century. Mayanist scholar Stephen Houston contests this view by arguing that future dates on Maya inscriptions were simply meant to draw parallels with contemporary events, and that the words on the stela describe a contemporary rather than a future scene.

=== La Corona ===
In April–May 2012, a team of archaeologists unearthed a previously unknown inscription on a stairway at the La Corona site in Guatemala. The inscription, on what is known as Hieroglyphic Stairway 12, describes the establishment of a royal court in Calakmul in 635 AD, and compares the then-recent completion of 13 kʼatuns with the future completion of the 13th bʼakʼtun. It contains no speculation or prophecy as to what the scribes believed would happen at that time.

=== Dates beyond bʼakʼtun 13 ===
Maya inscriptions occasionally mention predicted future events or commemorations that would occur on dates far beyond the completion of the 13th bʼakʼtun. Most of these are in the form of "distance dates"; Long Count dates together with an additional number, known as a Distance Number, which when added to them makes a future date. On the west panel at the Temple of Inscriptions in Palenque, a section of text projects forward to the 80th 52-year Calendar Round from the coronation of the ruler Kʼinich Janaabʼ Pakal. Pakal's accession occurred on 9.9.2.4.8, equivalent to 27 July 615 AD in the proleptic Gregorian calendar. The inscription begins with Pakal's birthdate of 9.8.9.13.0 (24 March, 603 AD Gregorian) and then adds the Distance Number 10.11.10.5.8 to it, arriving at a date of 21 October 4772 AD, more than 4,000 years after Pakal's time.

Another example is Stela 1 at Coba which marks the date of creation as 13.13.13.13.13.13.13.13.13.13.13.13.13.13.13.13.13.13.13.13.0.0.0.0, or nineteen units above the bʼakʼtun. According to Linda Schele, these 13s represent "the starting point of a huge odometer of time", with each acting as a zero and resetting to 1 as the numbers increase. Thus this inscription anticipates the current universe lasting at least 20^{21}×13×360 days, or roughly 2.687×10^{28} years; a time span equal to 2 quintillion times the age of the universe as determined by cosmologists. Others have suggested that this date marks creation as having occurred after that time span.

In 2012, researchers announced the discovery of a series of Maya astronomical tables in Xultún, Guatemala which plot the movements of the Moon and other astronomical bodies over the course of 17 bʼakʼtuns.

== New Age beliefs ==
Many assertions about the year 2012 form part of Mayanism, a non-codified collection of New Age beliefs about ancient Maya wisdom and spirituality. The term is distinct from "Mayanist", used to refer to an academic scholar of the Maya. Archaeoastronomer Anthony Aveni says that while the idea of "balancing the cosmos" was prominent in ancient Maya literature, the 2012 phenomenon did not draw from those traditions. Instead, it was bound up with American concepts such as the New Age movement, 2012 millenarianism, and the belief in secret knowledge from distant times and places. Themes found in 2012 literature included "suspicion towards mainstream Western culture", the idea of spiritual evolution, and the possibility of leading the world into the New Age by individual example or by a group's joined consciousness. The general intent of this literature was not to warn of impending doom but "to foster counter-cultural sympathies and eventually socio-political and 'spiritual' activism". Aveni, who has studied New Age and search for extraterrestrial intelligence (SETI) communities, describes 2012 narratives as the product of a "disconnected" society: "Unable to find spiritual answers to life's big questions within ourselves, we turn outward to imagined entities that lie far off in space or time—entities that just might be in possession of superior knowledge."

=== Origins ===
In 1975, the ending of bʼakʼtun 13 became the subject of speculation by several New Age authors, who asserted it would correspond with a global "transformation of consciousness". In Mexico Mystique: The Coming Sixth Age of Consciousness, Frank Waters tied Coe's original date of 24 December 2011 to astrology and the prophecies of the Hopi, while both José Argüelles (in The Transformative Vision) and Terence McKenna (in The Invisible Landscape) discussed the significance of the year 2012 without mentioning a specific day. Some research suggests that both Argüelles and McKenna were heavily influenced in this regard by the Mayanism of American author William S. Burroughs, who first portrayed the end of the Mayan Long Count as an apocalyptic shift of human consciousness in 1960's The Exterminator.

In 1983, with the publication of Robert J. Sharer's revised table of date correlations in the 4th edition of Morley's The Ancient Maya, each became convinced that 21 December 2012 had significant meaning. By 1987, the year in which he organized the Harmonic Convergence event, Argüelles was using the date 21 December 2012 in The Mayan Factor: Path Beyond Technology. He claimed that on 13 August 3113 BC the Earth began a passage through a "galactic synchronization beam" that emanated from the center of our galaxy, that it would pass through this beam during a period of 5200 tuns (Maya cycles of 360 days each), and that this beam would result in "total synchronization" and "galactic entrainment" of individuals "plugged into the Earth's electromagnetic battery" by 13.0.0.0.0 (21 December 2012). He believed that the Maya aligned their calendar to correspond to this phenomenon. Anthony Aveni has dismissed all of these ideas.

In 2001, Robert Bast wrote the first online articles regarding the possibility of a doomsday in 2012. In 2006, author Daniel Pinchbeck popularized New Age concepts about this date in his book 2012: The Return of Quetzalcoatl, linking bʼakʼtun 13 to beliefs in crop circles, alien abduction, and personal revelations based on the use of hallucinogenic drugs and mediumship. Pinchbeck claims to discern a "growing realization that materialism and the rational, empirical worldview that comes with it has reached its expiration date ... [w]e're on the verge of transitioning to a dispensation of consciousness that's more intuitive, mystical and shamanic".

=== Galactic alignment ===
There is no significant astronomical event tied to the Long Count's start date. Its supposed end date was tied to astronomical phenomena by esoteric, fringe, and New Age literature that placed great significance on astrology, especially astrological interpretations associated with the phenomenon of axial precession. Chief among these ideas is the astrological concept of a "galactic alignment".

==== Precession ====
In the Solar System, the planets and the Sun lie roughly within the same flat plane, known as the plane of the ecliptic. From our perspective on Earth, the ecliptic is the path taken by the Sun across the sky over the course of the year. The twelve constellations that line the ecliptic are known as the zodiacal constellations, and, annually, the Sun passes through all of them in turn. Additionally, over time, the Sun's annual cycle appears to recede very slowly backward by one degree every 72 years, or by one constellation approximately every 2,160 years. This backward movement, called "precession", is due to a slight wobble in the Earth's axis as it spins, and can be compared to the way a spinning top wobbles as it slows down. Over the course of 25,800 years, a period often called a Great Year, the Sun's path completes a full, 360-degree backward rotation through the zodiac. In Western astrological traditions, precession is measured from the March equinox, one of the two annual points at which the Sun is exactly halfway between its lowest and highest points in the sky. At the end of the 20th century and beginning of the 21st, the Sun's March equinox position was in the constellation Pisces moving back into Aquarius. This signaled the end of one astrological age (the Age of Pisces) and the beginning of another (the Age of Aquarius).

Similarly, the Sun's December solstice position (in the northern hemisphere, the lowest point on its annual path; in the southern hemisphere, the highest) was in the constellation of Sagittarius, one of two constellations in which the zodiac intersects with the Milky Way. Every year, on the December solstice, the Sun and the Milky Way, appear (from the surface of the Earth) to come into alignment, and every year precession caused a slight shift in the Sun's position in the Milky Way. Given that the Milky Way is between 10° and 20° wide, it takes between 700 and 1,400 years for the Sun's December solstice position to precess through it. In 2012 it was about halfway through the Milky Way, crossing the galactic equator. In 2012, the Sun's December solstice fell on 21 December.

==== Mysticism ====
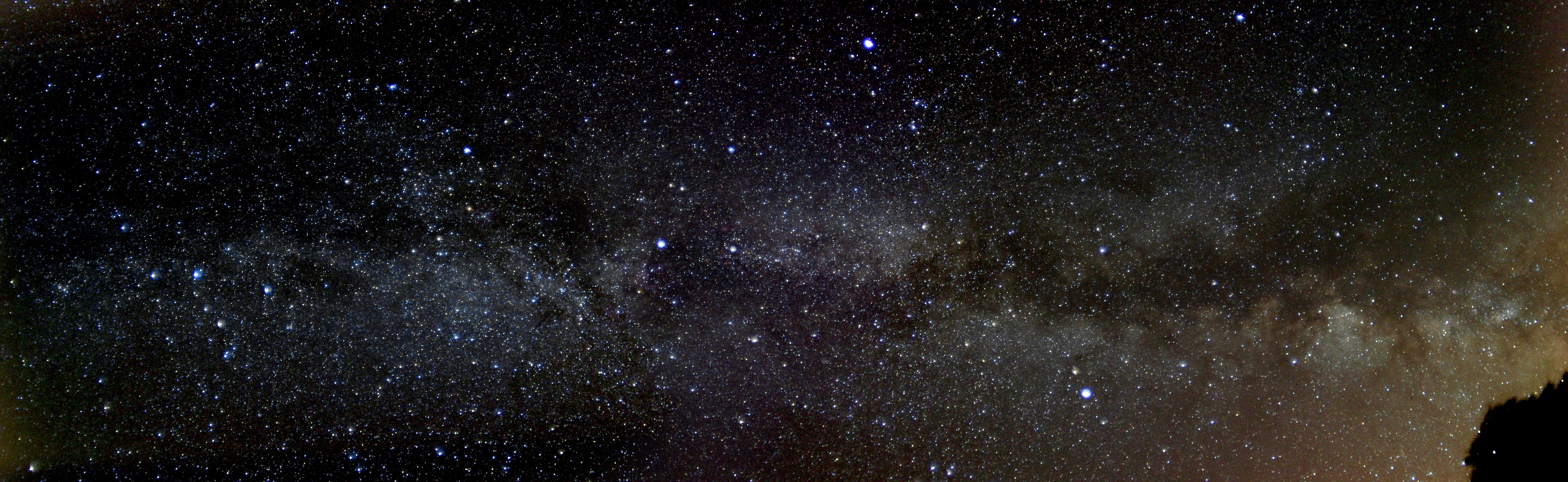
The Milky Way near Cygnus showing the lane of the Dark Rift, which the Maya called the Xibalba be or "Black Road"

Mystical speculations about the precession of the equinoxes and the Sun's proximity to the center of the Milky Way appeared in Hamlet's Mill (1969) by Giorgio de Santillana and Hertha von Deschend. These were quoted and expanded upon by Terence and Dennis McKenna in The Invisible Landscape (1975).

Adherents to the idea, following a theory first proposed by Munro Edmonson, alleged that the Maya based their calendar on observations of the Great Rift or Dark Rift, a band of dark dust clouds in the Milky Way, which, according to some scholars, the Maya called the Xibalba be or "Black Road". John Major Jenkins claims that the Maya were aware of where the ecliptic intersected the Black Road and gave this position in the sky a special significance in their cosmology. Jenkins said that precession would align the Sun precisely with the galactic equator at the 2012 winter solstice. Jenkins claimed that the classical Maya anticipated this conjunction and celebrated it as the harbinger of a profound spiritual transition for mankind. New Age proponents of the galactic alignment hypothesis argued that, just as astrology uses the positions of stars and planets to make claims of future events, the Maya plotted their calendars with the objective of preparing for significant world events. Jenkins attributed the insights of ancient Maya shamans about the Galactic Center to their use of psilocybin mushrooms, psychoactive toads, and other psychedelics. Jenkins also associated the Xibalba be with a "world tree", drawing on studies of contemporary (not ancient) Maya cosmology.

==== Criticism ====
Astronomers such as David Morrison argue that the galactic equator is an entirely arbitrary line and can never be precisely drawn, because it is impossible to determine the Milky Way's exact boundaries, which vary depending on clarity of view. Jenkins claimed he drew his conclusions about the location of the galactic equator from observations taken at above 11,000 feet (3,400 m), an altitude that gives a clearer image of the Milky Way than the Maya had access to. Furthermore, since the Sun is half a degree wide, its solstice position takes 36 years to precess its full width. Jenkins himself noted that even given his determined location for the line of the galactic equator, its most precise convergence with the center of the Sun already occurred in 1998, and so asserts that, rather than 2012, the galactic alignment instead focuses on a multi-year period centered in 1998.

There is no clear evidence that the classic Maya were aware of precession. Some Maya scholars, such as Barbara MacLeod, Michael Grofe, Eva Hunt, Gordon Brotherston, and Anthony Aveni, have suggested that some Mayan holy dates were timed to precessional cycles, but scholarly opinion on the subject remains divided. There is also little evidence, archaeological or historical, that the Maya placed any importance on solstices or equinoxes. It is possible that only the earliest among Mesoamericans observed solstices, (Note: Aveni 2009, pp. 54–55, citing Aveni & Hartung 2000.) but this is also a disputed issue among Mayanists. There is also no evidence that the classic Maya attached any importance to the Milky Way; there is no glyph in their writing system to represent it, and no astronomical or chronological table tied to it.

=== Timewave zero and the I Ching ===
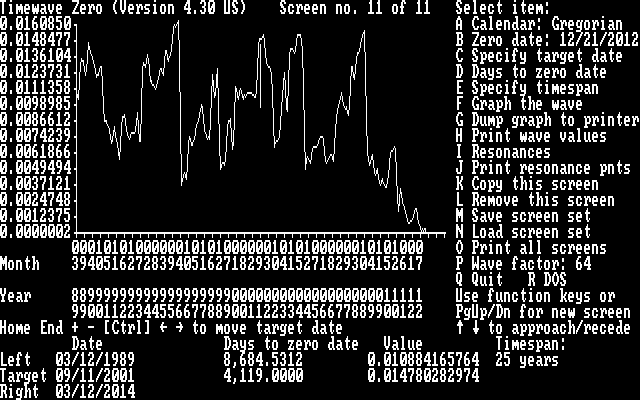
A screenshot of the "Timewave Zero" software

"Timewave zero" is a numerological formula that purports to calculate the ebb and flow of "novelty", defined as increase over time in the universe's interconnectedness, or organized complexity. Terence McKenna claimed that the universe has a teleological attractor at the end of time that increases interconnectedness. He believed this which would eventually reach a singularity of infinite complexity in 2012, at which point anything and everything imaginable would occur simultaneously. He conceived this idea over several years in the early to mid-1970s whilst using psilocybin mushrooms and DMT. The scientific community considers novelty theory to be pseudoscience.

McKenna expressed "novelty" in a computer program which produces a waveform known as "timewave zero" or the "timewave". Based on McKenna's interpretation of the King Wen sequence of the I Ching, an ancient Chinese book on divination, the graph purports to show great periods of novelty corresponding with major shifts in humanity's biological and sociocultural evolution. He believed that the events of any given time are resonantly related to the events of other times, and chose the atomic bombing of Hiroshima as the basis for calculating his end date of November 2012. When he later discovered this date's proximity to the end of the 13th bʼakʼtun of the Maya calendar, he revised his hypothesis so that the two dates matched.

The 1975 first edition of The Invisible Landscape referred to 2012 (but no specific day during the year) only twice. In the 1993 second edition, McKenna employed Sharer's date of 21 December 2012 throughout.

Novelty theory has been criticized for "rejecting countless ideas presumed as factual by the scientific community", depending "solely on numerous controversial deductions that contradict empirical logic", and encompassing "no suitable indication of truth", with the conclusion that novelty theory is a pseudoscience.

== Doomsday theories ==
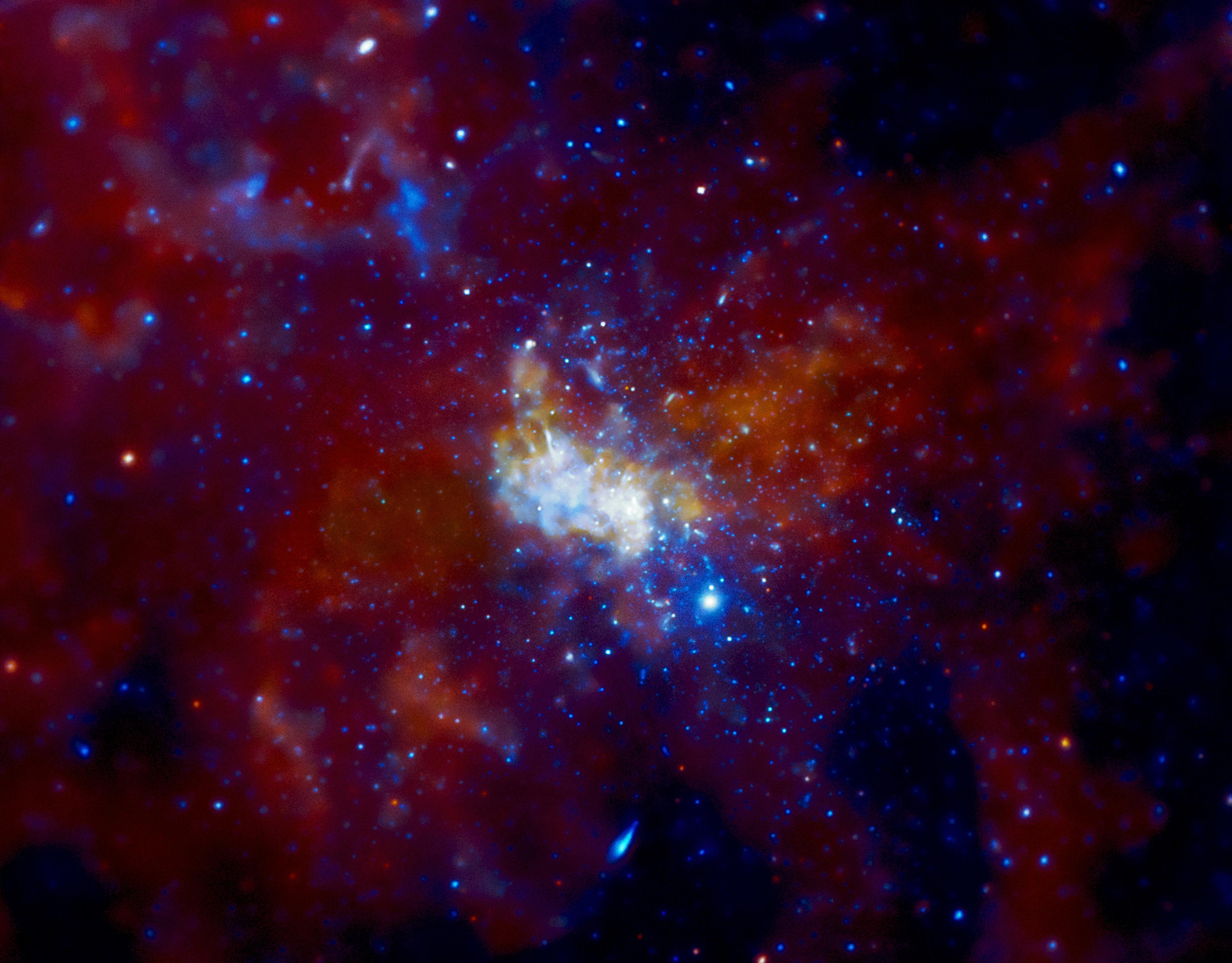
Sagittarius A*, taken by the Chandra X-Ray Observatory

The idea that the year 2012 presaged a world cataclysm, the end of the world, or the end of human civilization, became a subject of popular media speculation as the date of 21 December 2012 approached. This idea was promulgated by many pages on the Internet, particularly on YouTube. The Discovery Channel was criticized for its "quasi-documentaries" about the subject that "sacrifice[d] accuracy for entertainment".

=== Other alignments ===
Some people interpreted the galactic alignment apocalyptically, claiming that its occurrence would somehow create a combined gravitational effect between the Sun and the supermassive black hole at the center of our galaxy (known as Sagittarius A*), creating havoc on Earth. Apart from the "galactic alignment" already having happened in 1998, the Sun's apparent path through the zodiac as seen from Earth did not take it near the true galactic center, but rather several degrees above it. Even were this not the case, Sagittarius A* is 30,000 light years from Earth; it would have to have been more than 6 million times closer to cause any gravitational disruption to Earth's Solar System. This reading of the alignment was included on the History Channel documentary Decoding the Past. John Major Jenkins complained that a science fiction writer co-authored the documentary, and he went on to characterize it as "45 minutes of unabashed doomsday hype and the worst kind of inane sensationalism".

Some believers in a 2012 doomsday used the term "galactic alignment" to describe a different phenomenon proposed by some scientists to explain a pattern in mass extinctions supposedly observed in the fossil record. According to the Shiva hypothesis, mass extinctions are not random, but recur every 26 million years. To account for this, it was suggested that vertical oscillations made by the Sun on its 250-million-year orbit of the galactic center cause it to regularly pass through the galactic plane. When the Sun's orbit takes it outside the galactic plane which bisects the galactic disc, the influence of the galactic tide is weaker. When re-entering the galactic disc—as it does every 20–25 million years—it comes under the influence of the far stronger "disc tides", which, according to mathematical models, increase the flux of Oort cloud comets into the inner Solar System by a factor of 4, thus leading to a massive increase in the likelihood of a devastating comet impact. This "alignment" takes place over tens of millions of years, and could never be timed to an exact date. Evidence shows that the Sun passed through the plane bisecting the galactic disc three million years ago and in 2012 was moving farther above it.

A third suggested alignment was some sort of planetary conjunction occurring on 21 December 2012; there was no conjunction on that date. Multi-planet alignments did occur in both 2000 and 2010, each with no ill result for the Earth. Jupiter is the largest planet in the Solar System, being larger than all other planets combined. When Jupiter is near opposition, the difference in gravitational force that the Earth experiences is less than 1% of the force that the Earth feels daily from the Moon.

=== Geomagnetic reversal ===
Another idea tied to 2012 involved a geomagnetic reversal (often referred to as a pole shift by proponents), possibly triggered by a massive solar flare, that would release an energy equal to 100 billion atomic bombs. This belief was supposedly supported by observations that the Earth's magnetic field was weakening, which could precede a reversal of the north and south magnetic poles, and the arrival of the next solar maximum, which was expected sometime around 2012.

Most scientific estimates say that geomagnetic reversals take between 1,000 and 10,000 years to complete, and do not start on any particular date. The U.S. National Oceanic and Atmospheric Administration predicted that the solar maximum would peak in late 2013 or 2014, and that it would be fairly weak, with a below-average number of sunspots. There was no scientific evidence linking a solar maximum to a geomagnetic reversal, which is driven by forces entirely within the Earth.

A solar maximum does affect satellite and cellular phone communications. David Morrison attributed the rise of the solar storm idea to physicist and science popularizer Michio Kaku, who claimed in an interview with Fox News that a solar peak in 2012 could be disastrous for orbiting satellites, and to NASA's headlining a 2006 webpage as "Solar Storm Warning", a term later repeated on several doomsday pages.

On 23 July 2012, a massive, potentially damaging, solar storm came within nine days of striking Earth.

=== Planet X/Nibiru ===
Some believers in a 2012 doomsday claimed that a planet called Planet X, or Nibiru, would collide with or pass by the Earth. This idea, which had appeared in various forms since 1995, initially predicted Doomsday in May 2003, but proponents abandoned that date after it passed without incident. The idea originated from claims of channeling alien beings and is widely ridiculed. Astronomers calculated that such an object so close to Earth would be visible to anyone looking up at the night sky.

=== Other catastrophes ===
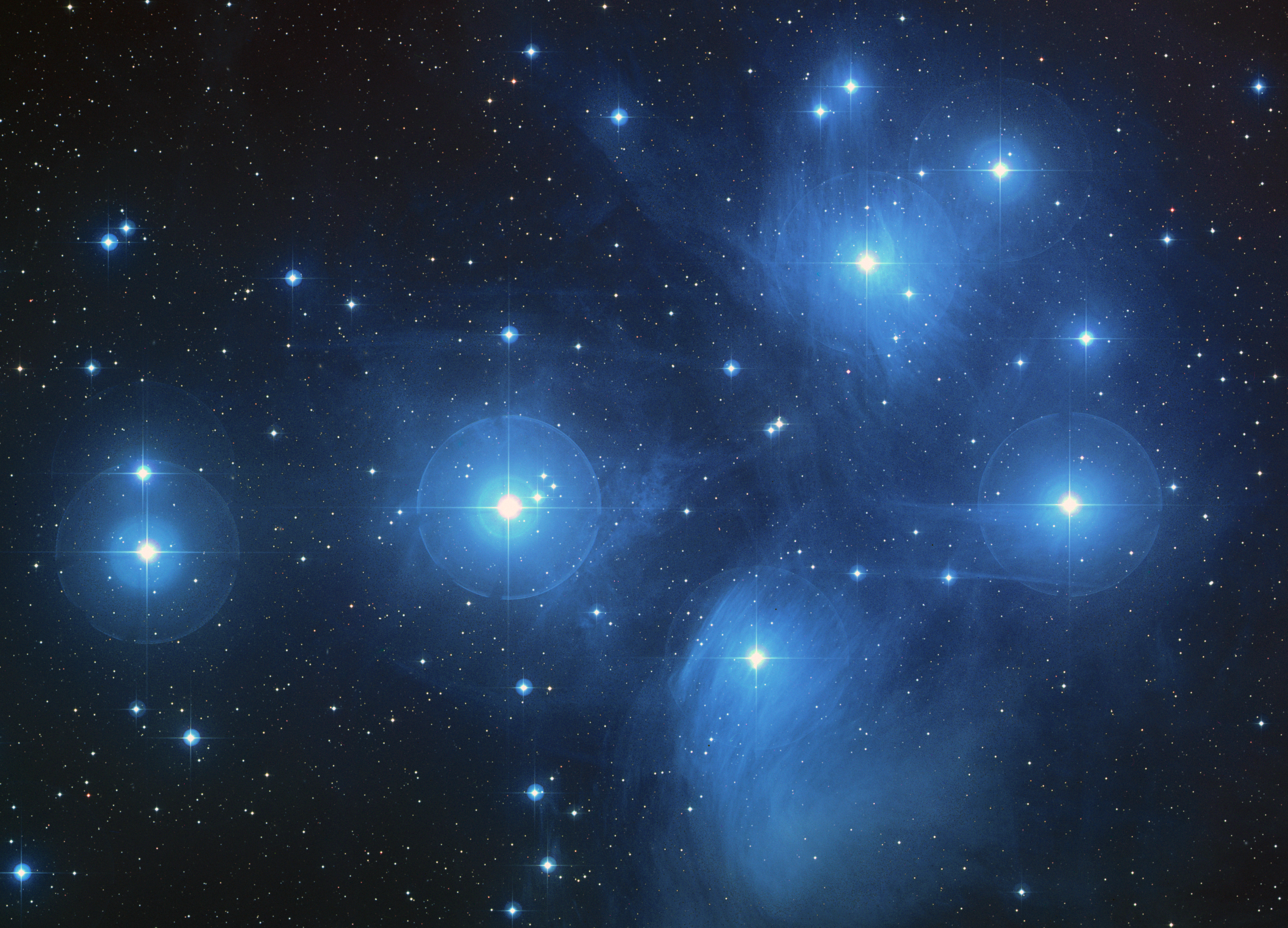
The Pleiades, a star cluster with supposed influence sometimes tied to the 2012 event

Author Graham Hancock, in his book Fingerprints of the Gods, interpreted Coe's remarks in Breaking the Maya Code as evidence for the prophecy of a global cataclysm. Filmmaker Roland Emmerich later credited the book with inspiring his 2009 disaster film 2012.

Other speculations regarding doomsday in 2012 included predictions by the Web Bot project, a computer program that purports to predict the future by analyzing Internet chatter. Commentators have rejected claims that the bot is able to predict natural disasters, as opposed to human-caused disasters like stock market crashes.

The 2012 date was also loosely tied to the long-running concept of the photon belt, which predicted a form of interaction between Earth and Alcyone, the largest star of the Pleiades cluster. Critics argued that photons cannot form belts, that the Pleiades, located more than 400 light years away, could have no effect on Earth, and that the Solar System, rather than getting closer to the Pleiades, was in fact moving farther away from it.

Some media outlets tied the fact that the red supergiant star Betelgeuse would undergo a supernova at some point in the future to the 2012 phenomenon. While Betelgeuse was certainly in the final stages of its life, and would die as a supernova, there was no way to predict the timing of the event to within 100,000 years. To be a threat to Earth, a supernova would need to be no further than 25 light years from the Solar System. Betelgeuse is roughly 600 light years away, and so its supernova would not affect Earth. In December 2011, NASA's Francis Reddy issued a press release debunking the possibility of a supernova occurring in 2012.

Another claim involved alien invasion. In December 2010, an article, first published in examiner.com and later referenced in the English-language edition of Pravda claimed, citing a Second Digitized Sky Survey photograph as evidence, that SETI had detected three large spacecraft due to arrive at Earth in 2012. Astronomer and debunker Phil Plait noted that by using the small-angle formula, one could determine that if the object in the photo were as large as claimed, it would have had to be closer to Earth than the Moon, which would mean it would already have arrived. In January 2011, Seth Shostak, chief astronomer of SETI, issued a press release debunking the claims.

== Public reaction ==
The phenomenon spread widely after coming to public notice, particularly on the Internet, and hundreds of thousands of websites made reference to it. "Ask an Astrobiologist", a NASA public outreach website, received over 5,000 questions from the public on the subject from 2007, some asking whether they should kill themselves, their children or their pets. In May 2012, an Ipsos poll of 16,000 adults in 21 countries found that 8 percent had experienced fear or anxiety over the possibility of the world ending in December 2012, while an average of 10 percent agreed with the statement "the Mayan calendar, which some say 'ends' in 2012, marks the end of the world", with responses as high as 20 percent in China, 13 percent in Russia, Turkey, Japan and Korea, and 12 percent in the United States. At least one suicide was directly linked to fear of a 2012 apocalypse, with others anecdotally reported. Jared Lee Loughner, the perpetrator of the 2011 Tucson shooting, followed 2012-related predictions. A panel of scientists questioned on the topic at a plenary session at the Astronomical Society of the Pacific contended that the Internet played a substantial role in allowing this doomsday date to gain more traction than previous similar panics.

=== Europe ===
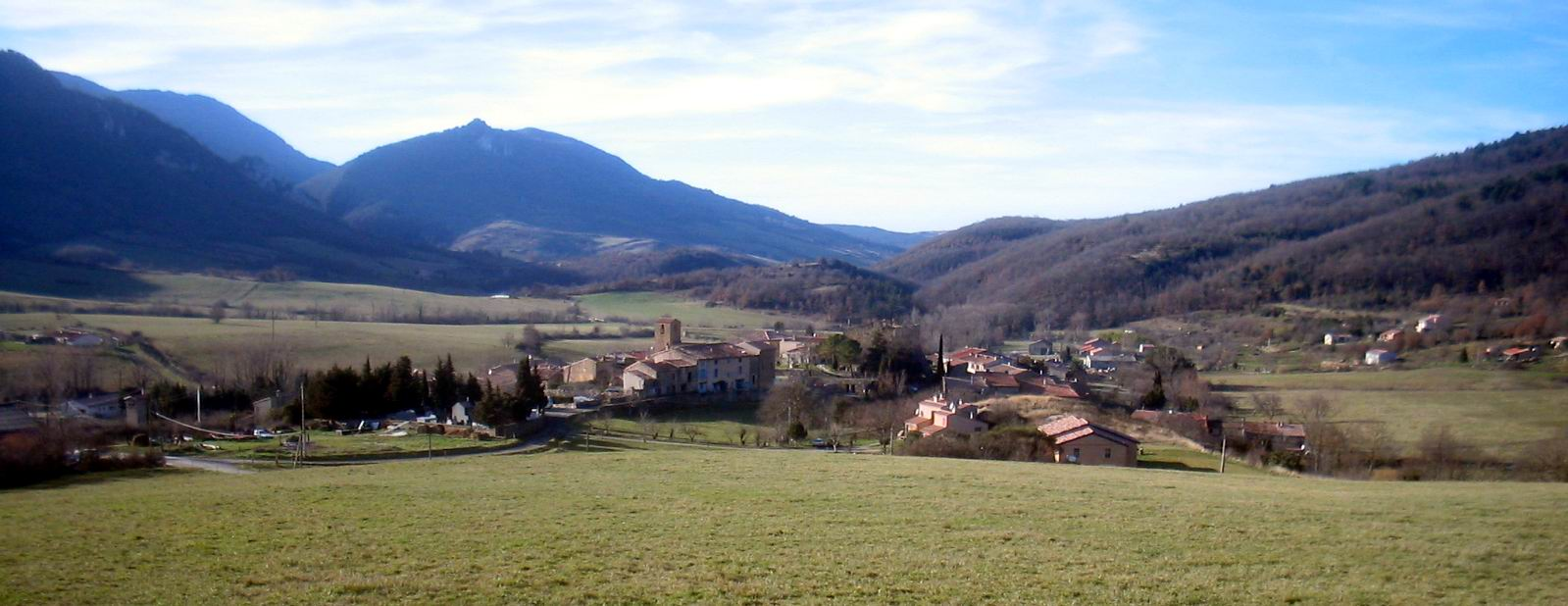
Pic de Bugarach, Camps-sur-l'Agly, France; a target of "esoterics" who believed that some great transition would occur in 2012

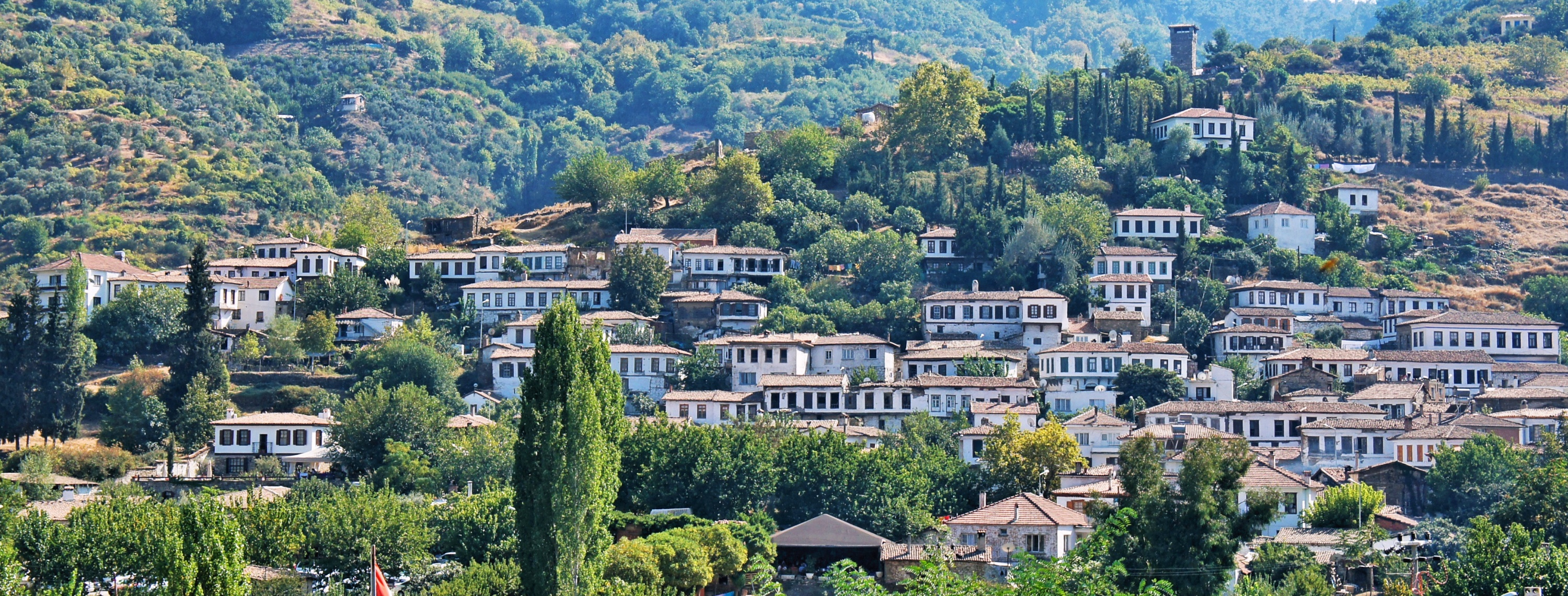
Şirince, İzmir Province, Turkey, a village of around 560 inhabitants, has a "positive energy" according to some doomsday cultists, who say that it is close to an area where Catholics believe the Virgin Mary was assumed into Heaven.

Beginning in 2000, the small French village of Bugarach, population 189, began receiving visits from "esoterics"—mystic believers who had concluded that the local mountain, Pic de Bugarach, was the ideal location to weather the transformative events of 2012. In 2011, the local mayor, Jean-Pierre Delord, began voicing fears to the international press that the small town would be overwhelmed by an influx of thousands of visitors in 2012, even suggesting he might call in the army. "We've seen a huge rise in visitors", Delord told The Independent in March 2012. "Already this year more than 20,000 people have climbed right to the top, and last year we had 10,000 hikers, which was a significant rise on the previous 12 months. They think Pic de Bugarach is 'un garage à ovnis' [a garage for UFOs]. The villagers are exasperated: the exaggerated importance of something which they see as completely removed from reality is bewildering. After 21 December, this will surely return to normal." In December 2012, the French government placed 100 police and firefighters around both Bugarach and Pic de Bugarach, limiting access to potential visitors. Ultimately, only about 1,000 visitors appeared at the height of the "event". Two raves were foiled, 12 people had to be turned away from the peak, and 5 people were arrested for carrying weapons. Jean-Pierre Delord was criticised by members of the community for failing to take advantage of the media attention and promote the region.

The Turkish village of Şirince, near Ephesus, expected to receive over 60,000 visitors on 21 December 2012, as New Age mystics believed its "positive energy" would aid in weathering the catastrophe. Only a fraction of that number actually arrived, with a substantial component being police and journalists, and the expected windfall failed to materialise.

Similarly, the pyramid-like mountain of Rtanj, in the Serbian Carpathians, attracted attention, due to rumors that it would emit a powerful force shield on the day, protecting those in the vicinity. Hotels around the base were full.

In Russia, inmates of a women's prison experienced "a collective mass psychosis" in the weeks leading up to the supposed doomsday, while residents of a factory town near Moscow reportedly emptied a supermarket of matches, candles, food and other supplies. The Minister of Emergency Situations declared in response that according to "methods of monitoring what is occurring on the planet Earth", there would be no apocalypse in December. When asked when the world would end in a press conference, Russian President Vladimir Putin said, "In about 4.5 billion years."

In December 2012, Vatican astronomer Rev. José Funes wrote in the Vatican newspaper L'Osservatore Romano that apocalyptic theories around 2012 were "not even worth discussing".

=== Asia and Australia ===
In May 2011, 5,000–7,000 Hmong ethnic people in Dien Bien province, Vietnam held a protest on the grounds that the end of the world was coming, and the Hmong people would be evacuated to their own Hmong country by "supernatural force". The Vietnamese media and government believe that this is a trick of the Hmong ethnic separatist forces.

In China, up to a thousand members of the Christian cult Almighty God were arrested after claiming that the end of bʼakʼtun 13 marked the end of the world, and that it was time to overthrow Communism. Shoppers were reported to be hoarding supplies of candles in anticipation of coming darkness, while online retailer Taobao sold tickets to board Noah's Ark to customers. Bookings for wedding ceremonies on 21 December 2012 were saturated in several cities. On 14 December 2012, a man in Henan province attacked and wounded twenty-three children with a knife. Authorities suspected the man had been "influenced" by the prediction of the upcoming apocalypse. Academics in China attributed the widespread belief in the 2012 doomsday in their country to a lack of scientific literacy and a mistrust of the government-controlled media.

On 6 December 2012, Australian Prime Minister Julia Gillard delivered a hoax speech for the radio station triple J in which she declared "My dear remaining fellow Australians; the end of the world is coming. Whether the final blow comes from flesh-eating zombies, demonic hell-beasts or from the total triumph of K-Pop, if you know one thing about me it is this—I will always fight for you to the very end." Radio announcer Neil Mitchell described the hoax as "immature" and pondered whether it demeaned her office.

Jasper Tsang, president of Hong Kong's Legislative Council, adjourned the legislature's sitting on 20 December 2012 by announcing that he "would not permit the world to end" as the legislature had to meet again in January 2013, to the laughter of MPs.

=== Mexico and Central America ===
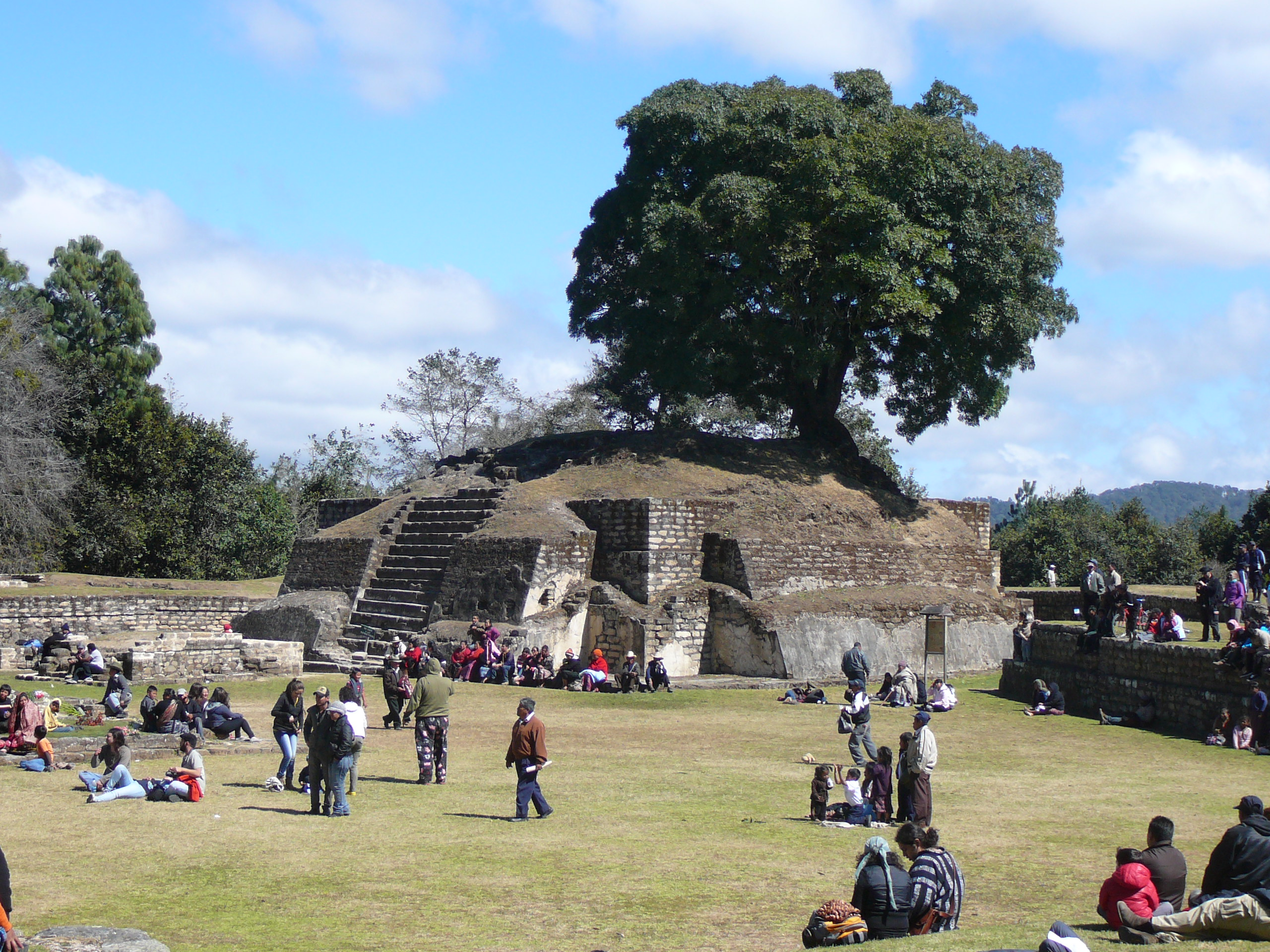
The Mayan Ruins of Iximche in Tecpán Guatemala on 21 December 2012

Mesoamerican countries that once formed part of the Maya civilization—Mexico, Belize, Guatemala, Honduras, and El Salvador—all organized festivities to commemorate the end of bʼakʼtun 13 at the largest Maya sites. On 21 December 2011, the Maya town of Tapachula in Chiapas activated an eight-foot digital clock counting down the days until the end of bʼakʼtun 13. On 21 December 2012, major events took place at Chichén Itzá in Mexico and Tikal in Guatemala. In El Salvador, the largest event was held at Tazumal, and in Honduras, at Copán. In all of these archaeological sites, Maya rituals were held at dawn led by shamans and Maya priests.

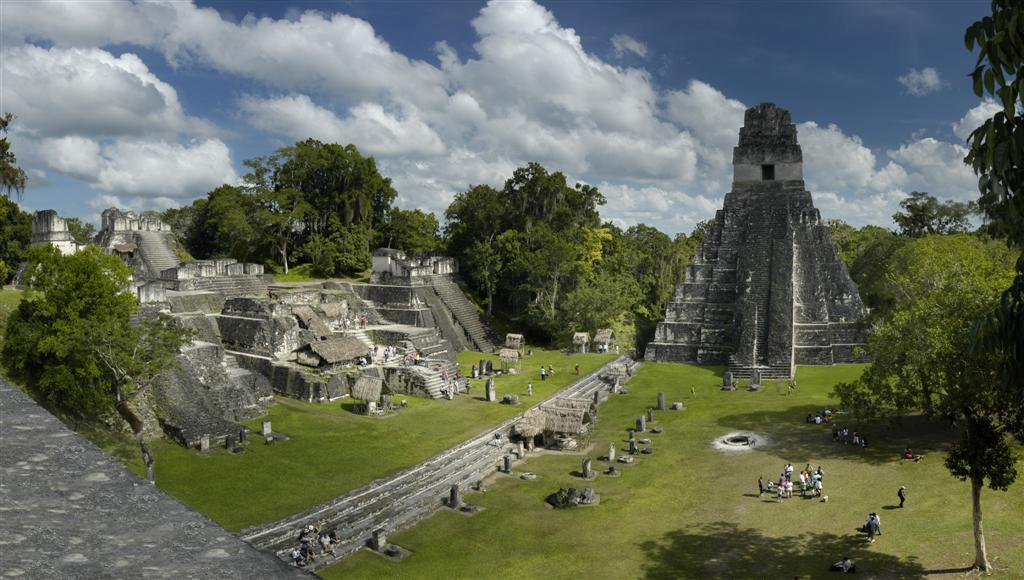
The Mayan fire ceremony held at dawn in Tikal on 21 December 2012, took place in the main plaza in front of the Temple of the Great Jaguar.

On the final day of bʼakʼtun 13, residents of Yucatán and other regions formerly dominated by the ancient Maya celebrated what they saw as the dawn of a new, better era. According to official figures from Mexico's National Institute of Anthropology and History (INAH), about 50,000 people visited Mexican archaeological sites on 21 December 2012. Of those, 10,000 visited Chichén Itzá in Yucatán, 9,900 visited Tulum in Quintana Roo, and 8,000 visited Palenque in Chiapas. An additional 10,000 people visited Teotihuacan near Mexico City, which is not a Maya site. The main ceremony in Chichén Itzá was held at dawn in the plaza of the Temple of Kukulkán, one of the principal symbols of Maya culture. The archaeological site was opened two hours early to receive thousands of tourists, mostly foreigners who came to participate in events scheduled for the end of bʼakʼtun 13.

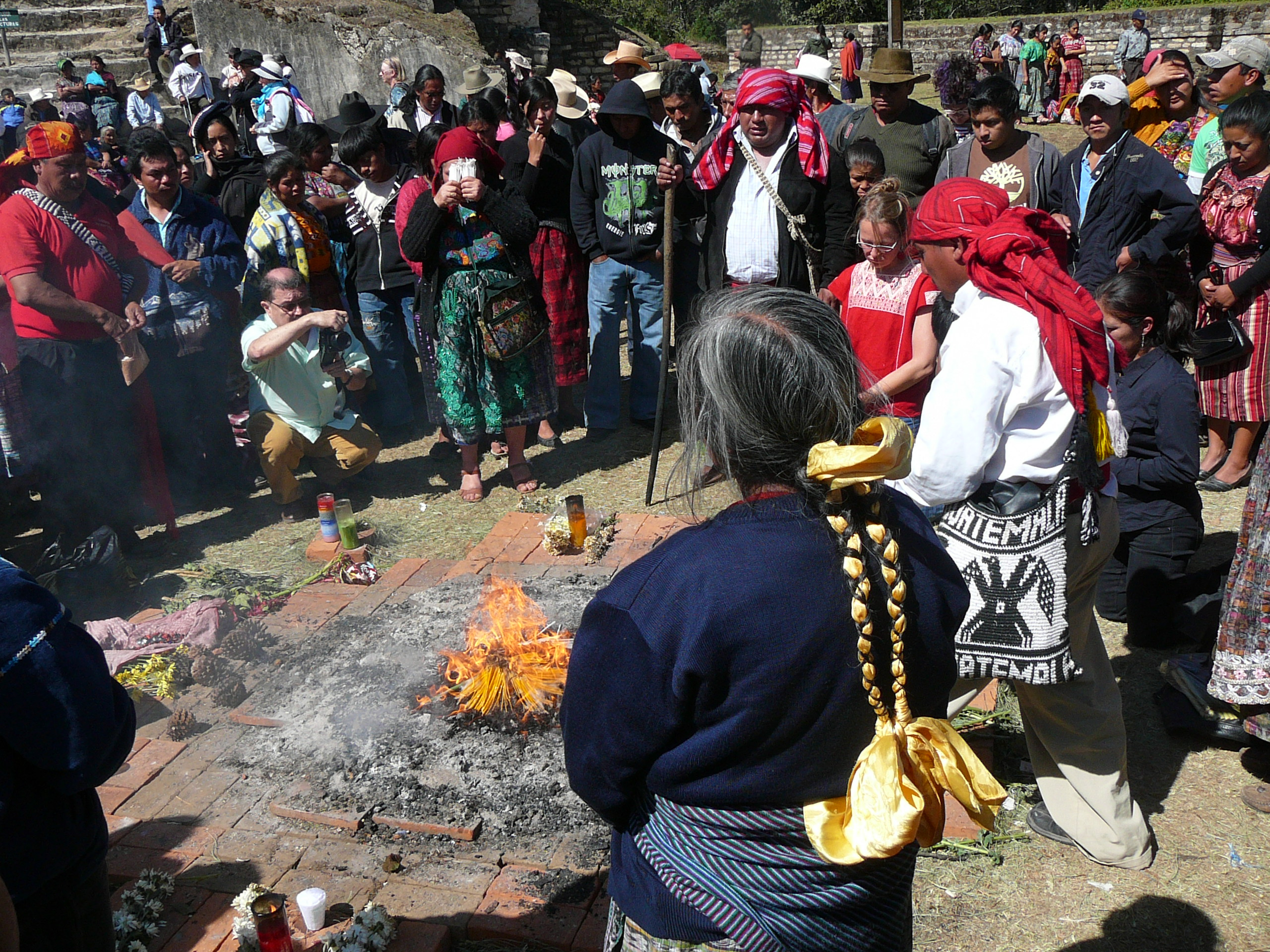
A fire ceremony and indigenous peoples' civil rights rally at Iximche on 21 December 2012

The fire ceremony at Tikal was held at dawn in the main plaza of the Temple of the Great Jaguar. The ceremony was led by Guatemalan and foreign priests. The President of Guatemala, Otto Pérez, and of Costa Rica, Laura Chinchilla, participated in the event as special guests. During the ceremony the priests asked for unity, peace and the end of discrimination and racism, with the hope that the start of a new cycle will be a "new dawn". About 3,000 people participated in the event.

Most of these events were organized by agencies of the Mexican and Central American governments, and their respective tourism industries expected to attract thousands of visitors. Mexico is visited by about 22 million foreigners in a typical year. In 2012, the national tourism agency expected to attract 52 million visitors just to the regions of Chiapas, Yucatán, Quintana Roo, Tabasco and Campeche. A Maya activist group in Guatemala, Oxlaljuj Ajpop, objected to the commercialization of the date. A spokesman from the Conference of Maya Ministers commented that for them the Tikal ceremony is not a show for tourists but something spiritual and personal. The secretary of the Great Council of Ancestral Authorities commented that living Maya felt they were excluded from the activities in Tikal. This group held a parallel ceremony, and complained that the date has been used for commercial gain. In addition, before the main Tikal ceremony, about 200 Maya protested the celebration because they felt excluded. Most modern Maya were indifferent to the ceremonies, and the small number of people still practising ancient rites held solemn, more private ceremonies.

Osvaldo Gomez, a technical advisor to the Tikal site, complained that many visitors during the celebration had illegally climbed the stairs of the Temple of the Masks, causing "irreparable" damage.

=== South America ===
In Brazil, Décio Colla, the Mayor of the City of São Francisco de Paula, Rio Grande do Sul, mobilized the population to prepare for the end of the world by stocking up on food and supplies. In the city of Corguinho, in the Mato Grosso do Sul, a colony was built for survivors of the expected tragedy. In Alto Paraíso de Goiás, the hotels also made specific reservations for prophetic dates.

In Bolivia, President Evo Morales participated in Quechua and Aymara rituals, organized with government support, to commemorate the Southern solstice that took place in Isla del Sol, in the southern part of Lake Titicaca. During the event, Morales proclaimed the beginning of "Pachakuti", meaning the world's wake up to a culture of life and the beginning of the end to world capitalism, and he proposed to dismantle the International Monetary Fund and the World Bank.

On 21 December 2012, the Uritorco mountain in Córdoba, Argentina was closed, as a mass suicide there had been proposed on Facebook.

=== United States ===
In the United States, sales of private underground blast shelters increased noticeably after 2009, with many construction companies' advertisements calling attention to the 2012 apocalypse. In Michigan, schools were closed for the Christmas holidays two days early, in part because rumours of the 2012 apocalypse were raising fears of repeat shootings similar to that at Sandy Hook. American reality TV stars Heidi Montag and Spencer Pratt revealed that they had spent most of their $10 million of accumulated earnings by 2010 because they believed the world would end in 2012.

== Cultural influence ==
The 2012 phenomenon was discussed or referenced by several media outlets. Several TV documentaries, as well as some contemporary fictional references to the year 2012, referred to 21 December as the day of a cataclysmic event.

The TV series The X-Files cited 22 December 2012 as the date for an alien colonization of the Earth, and mentioned the Mayan calendar "stopping" on this date. The History Channel aired a handful of special series on doomsday that included analysis of 2012 theories, such as Decoding the Past (2005–2007), 2012, End of Days (2006), Last Days on Earth (2006), Seven Signs of the Apocalypse (2009), and Nostradamus 2012 (2008). The Discovery Channel also aired 2012 Apocalypse in 2009, suggesting that massive solar storms, magnetic pole reversal, earthquakes, supervolcanoes, and other drastic natural events could occur in 2012. In 2012, the National Geographic Channel launched a show called Doomsday Preppers, a documentary series about survivalists preparing for various cataclysms, including the 2012 doomsday.

Hundreds of books were published on the topic. The bestselling book of 2009, Dan Brown's The Lost Symbol, featured a coded mock email number (2456282.5) that decoded to the Julian date for 21 December 2012.

In the Ubisoft video game franchise Assassin's Creed, the overarching plotline of the games starring the first protagonist, Desmond Miles, was also inspired by the phenomenon. After escaping capture by the Knights Templar, Desmond rejoins the Assassins Brotherhood to help them fight the Templars and prevent the predicted end of the world, in this case caused by a cyclical solar flare.

In cinema, Roland Emmerich's 2009 science fiction disaster film 2012 was inspired by the phenomenon, and advance promotion prior to its release included a stealth marketing campaign in which television commercials and websites from the fictional "Institute for Human Continuity" called on people to prepare for the end of the world. As these promotions did not mention the film itself, many viewers believed them to be real and contacted astronomers in panic. Although the campaign was criticized, the film became one of the most successful of its year, grossing nearly $770 million worldwide. An article in The Daily Telegraph attributed the widespread fear of the phenomenon in China to the film, which was a hit in the country as it depicted the Chinese building "survival arks". Lars von Trier's 2011 film Melancholia featured a plot in which a planet emerges from behind the Sun on a collision course with Earth.

The phenomenon also inspired several rock and pop music hits. As early as 1997, "A Certain Shade of Green" by Incubus referred to the mystical belief that a shift in perception would arrive in 2012 ("Are you gonna stand around till 2012 A.D.? / What are you waiting for, a certain shade of green?"). More recent hits include "Time for Miracles" (2009) performed by Adam Lambert, "2012 (It Ain't the End)" (2010) performed by Jay Sean featuring Nicki Minaj, "Till the World Ends" (2011) performed by Britney Spears and "2012 (If The World Would End)" (2012) performed by Mike Candys featuring Evelyn & Patrick Miller. Towards mid-December 2012, an internet hoax related to South Korean singer Psy being one of the Four Horsemen of the Apocalypse was widely circulated around social media platforms. The hoax purported that once Psy's "Gangnam Style" YouTube video amassed a billion views, the world would end. Indian composer A. R. Rahman, known for Slumdog Millionaire, released his single "Infinite Love" to "instill faith and optimism in people" prior to the hypothesized doomsday. The artwork for All Time Low's 2012 album Don't Panic satirizes various cataclysmic events associated with the phenomenon. The phenomenon was also satirized in Brian M. Clark's 2010 novelty book What Will Really Happen In 2012?: Mysteries Of The 13 B'aktun Paradox Decoded, which consisted of 200 pages each only containing the sentence, "Nothing special is going to happen in 2012, you jackass."

A number of brands ran commercials tied to the phenomenon in the days and months leading to the date. In February 2012, American automotive company General Motors aired an advertisement during the annual Super Bowl football game in which a group of friends drove Chevrolet Silverados through the ruins of human civilization following the 2012 apocalypse. On 17 December 2012, Jell-O ran an ad saying that offering Jell-O to the Mayan gods would appease them into sparing the world. John Verret, Professor of Advertising at Boston University, questioned the utility of tying large sums of money to such a unique and short-term event.

== See also ==
- List of dates predicted for apocalyptic events
- 13 (number)
- 2011 end times prediction
- Doomsday cult
- Dreamspell
- List of topics characterized as pseudoscience
- Triskaidekaphobia
