= Désix =

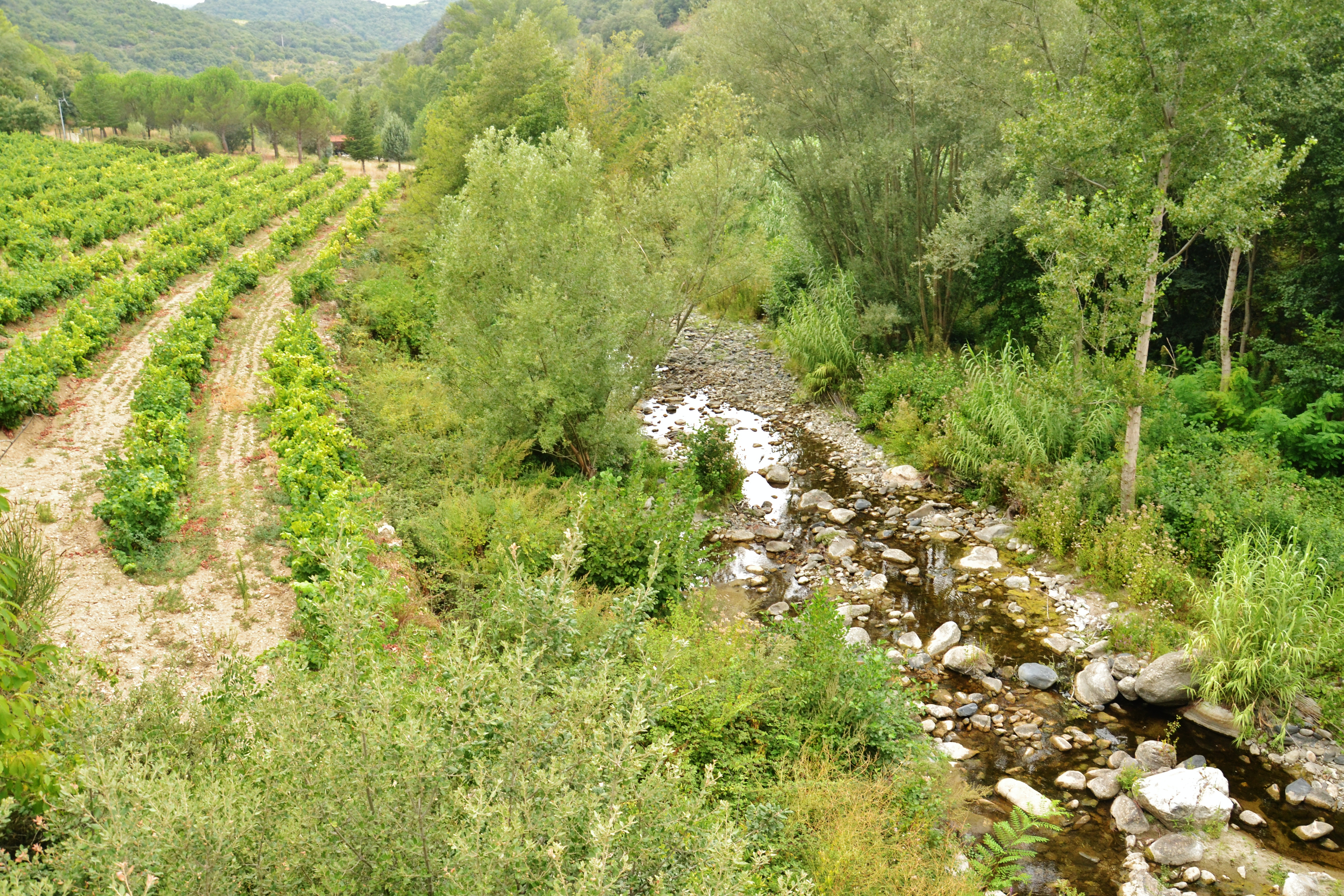

- Location within France Location within Occitanie

Location
- Country: France

Physical characteristics
- Source
  - location: Fenolheda
- Mouth: Agly
  - coordinates: 42.7587°N 2.5282°E
- Length: 32.3 km (20.1 mi)

Basin features
- Progression: Agly→ Mediterranean Sea

The Désix is a river in the south of France. It is 32.3 km (20.1 mi) long. Its source is in Fenolheda, near Aussières peak. It flows through Rabouillet, Sournia, Pézilla-de-Conflent, Felluns and Trilla before it empties into the Agly near Ansignan .

== Tributaries ==
- Matassa
