= Agly =

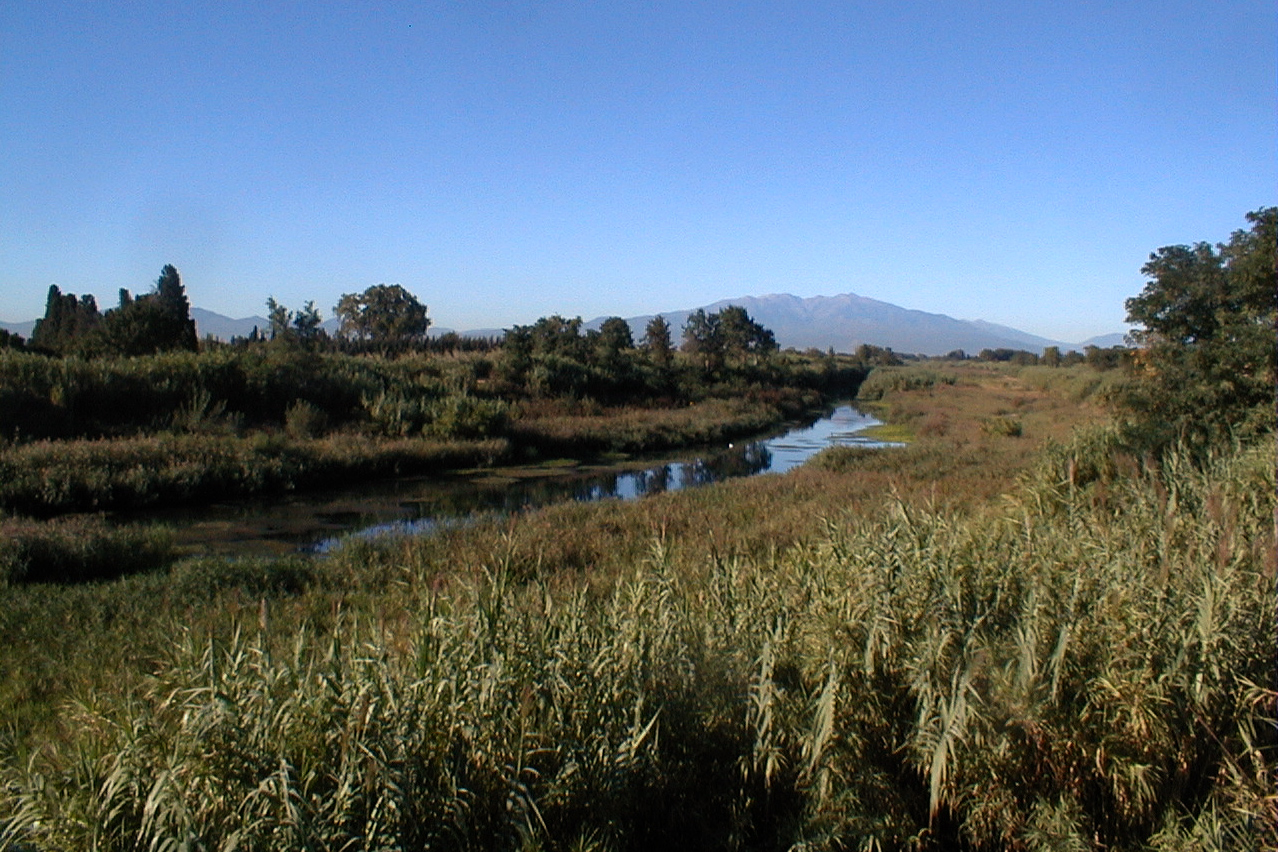

Location
- Country: France

Physical characteristics
- Source
  - location: Corbières Massif
- Mouth
  - location: Mediterranean Sea
  - coordinates: 42°46′44″N 3°2′20″E
- Length: 80 km (50 mi)
- Basin size: 903 km^{2} (349 mi^{2})
- Discharge
  - average: 6.31 m^{3}/s (223 cu ft/s)

The Agly (French pronunciation: [aɡli]; Catalan: Aglí; Occitan: Aglin) is a river located in southern France.With a length of 79.9 km (49.6 mi), it originates in the hills of the Corbières Massif near Camps-sur-l'Agly. The river passes through various towns and villages including Saint-Paul-de-Fenouillet, Estagel, Rivesaltes and Saint-Laurent-de-la-Salanque before it flows into the Mediterranean Sea near Le Barcarès.

== Tributaries ==
- Boulzane
- Désix
- Verdouble
