= Bugarach =

Commune in Occitanie, France

Bugarach Burgarag
- Commune
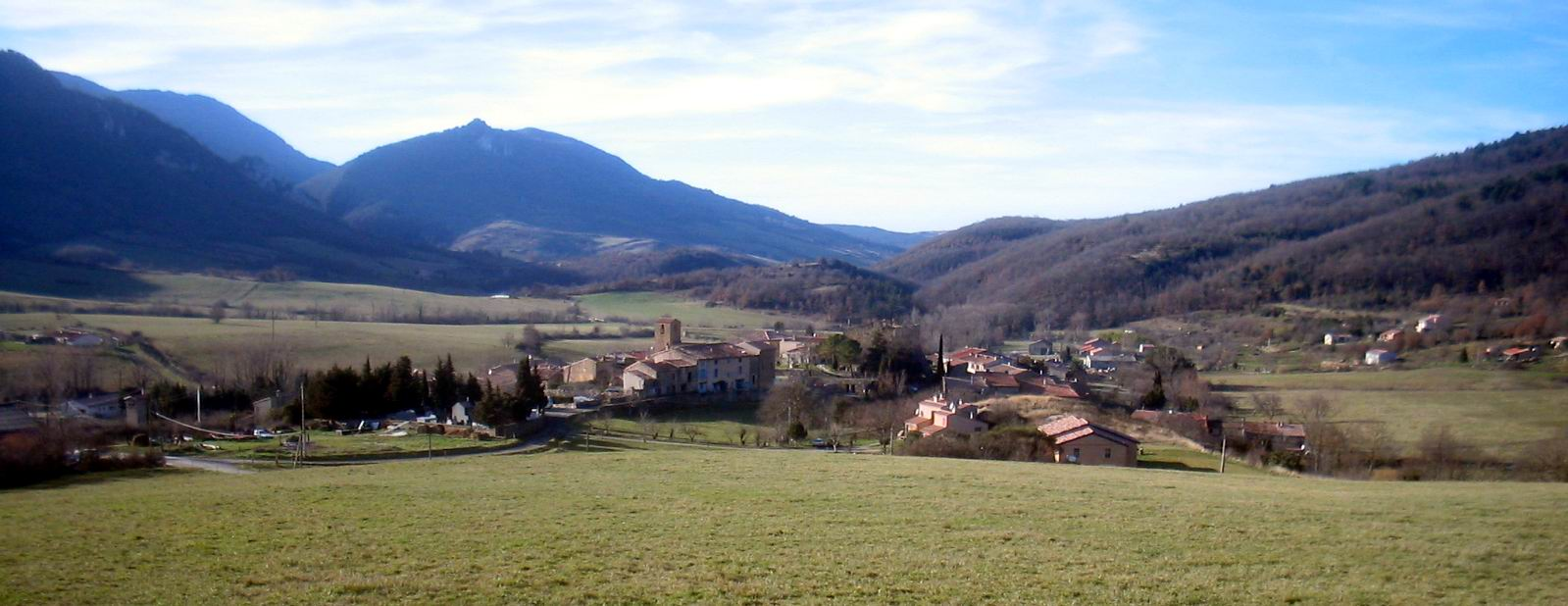
- A general view of Bugarach

- Coat of arms
- Location of Bugarach
- Location within France Location within Occitanie
- Coordinates: 42°52′41″N 2°21′07″E
- Country: France
- Region: Occitania
- Department: Aude
- Arrondissement: Limoux
- Canton: La Haute-Vallée de l'Aude

Government
  - Mayor (2020–2026): Jean-Pierre Delord
- Area^{1}: 26.62 km^{2} (10.28 sq mi)
- Elevation: 427 m (1,401 ft)
- Highest elevation: 1,231 m (4,039 ft)
- Lowest elevation: 340 m (1,120 ft)
- Population (2023): 250
  - Density: 9.4/km^{2} (24/sq mi)
- Time zone: UTC+01:00 (CET)
  - Summer (DST): UTC+02:00 (CEST)
- INSEE/Postal code: 11055 /11190
- ^{1} French Land Register data, which excludes lakes, ponds, glaciers > 1 km^{2} (0.386 sq mi or 247 acres) and river estuaries.

Bugarach (French pronunciation: [byɡaʁaʃ]; Occitan: Bugarag) is a commune in the Aude department in southern France, around 35 km south of Carcassonne. The economy is based on agriculture and tourism, attracting many New Age adherents.

== Geography ==
Bugarach is at the foot of Pic de Bugarach, a 1,230 metres (4,040 ft) mountain peak and the highest summit in the Corbières Massif. The peak is also called the "upside down mountain" as the top layers of rock are older than the lower layers due to uplift of the Pyrenees.

It is also located on the Green Meridian.

== History ==
The development of Bogomillism

The location is mentioned for the first time as Villa Burgaragio in 889 AD; it derives from the name "Bugari" of the Bulgarian Bogomilis in medieval France. In the 18th century the village became known for manufacturing wooden tools and hats. In modern times many esoteric and UFO legends have been connected to this place.

== Economy ==
The major economic activity of the village and surrounding region is agriculture and tourism. Demand for holiday cottages and popularity with New Age followers led to a rise in real estate prices.

== Cult settlements ==
In the 1960s and 70s Pic de Bugarach became popular with the hippie movement. Later in the 20th century it became popular with New Age followers who believed the "upside down mountain" had mystical powers, spreading to the belief that the village would be spared in the forecast 2012 apocalypse.

Cult followers believed aliens resided inside the mountain and would spare any humans that decide to leave the planet with them in the coming apocalypse. In 2011, the number of visitors doubled to over 20,000 and France's cult watchdog, Miviludes, placed the village under scrutiny due to concern over possible mass suicides. The mayor even considered calling the army over concerns caused by this issue.

== Population ==
Historical population
Year	Pop.	±% p.a.
1968	156	—
1975	125	−3.12%
1982	144	+2.04%
1990	153	+0.76%
1999	176	+1.57%
2007	189	+0.89%
2012	210	+2.13%
2017	228	+1.66%
2023	250	+1.55%
Source: INSEE

== See also ==
- Communes of the Aude department
