= Pic de Bugarach =

Mountain in the Corbières Massif in the French Midi

- Pech de Bugarach
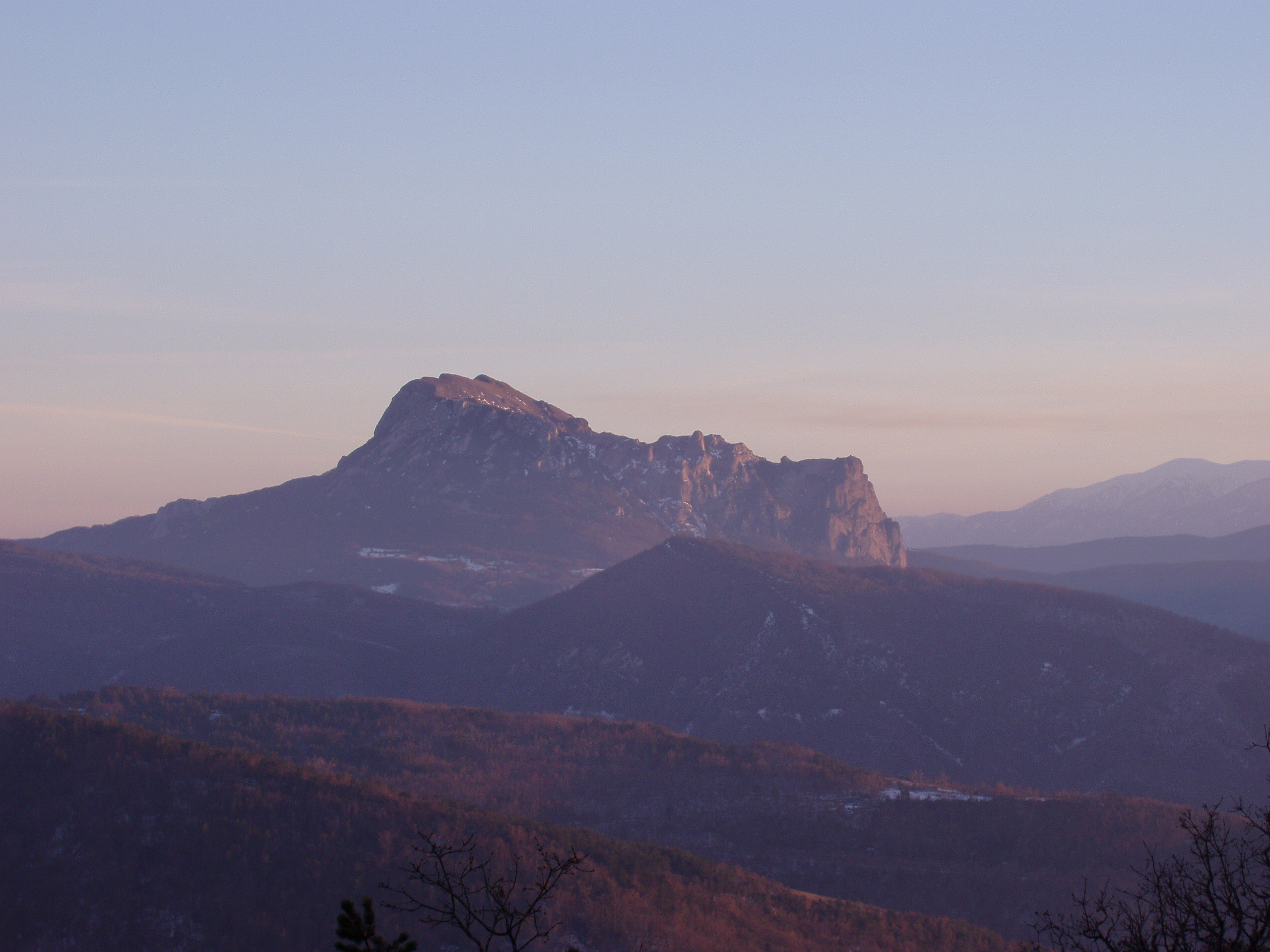

Highest point
- Elevation: 1,230 m (4,040 ft)
- Coordinates: 42°51′49″N 02°22′45″E

Naming
- Native name: Puèg de Bugarag (Occitan)

Geography
- Location within France
- Location: Aude, France
- Parent range: Corbières Massif

The Pic de Bugarach (French: [pik də byɡaʁaʃ]) or Pech de Bugarach (French: [pɛʃ -]; Occitan: Puèg de Bugarag [ˈpɥɛdʒ ðe βyɣaˈɾatʃ]; "Peak of Bugarag") is the highest summit (1230 m) in the Corbières Massif in the French Midi.

The western part of the mountain is located on the territory of the commune of Bugarach. Its eastern part is on the territory of Camps-sur-l'Agly.

The geology of the Pic de Bugarach is striking. Its top layer is an overthrust from the Iberian plate and is older than the bottom ones. This has given rise to its description as an "upside-down mountain".

It is possible to climb up the Bugarach: a classical route called "Voie de la fenêtre" because of a big hole in a cliff, climbs the South face. One may go down via the easiest route, North, and join the "Col de Linas". Climbing still requires a good physical condition, and the mountain has claimed the life of at least one unprepared tourist.

== Esoterics ==
Due to the mountain's unusual geology, a number of New Agers (called "esoterics" by local residents) believed that the mountain contained aliens living in a spacecraft. This group also believed that the upcoming end to the Mesoamerican Long Count calendar would result in some form of apocalypse. They believed that on 21 December 2012, the aliens supposedly living in the mountain would emerge to save them.

As a result, some members of the group had taken to living on or near the mountain, and The Independent reported that up to 100,000 people might have been planning a trip prior to the believed apocalypse date. The mayor of the nearest town, Bugarach, said that over 20,000 visitors had arrived between January and July 2011, a significant increase over previous years. He also reported that a number of groups have been taking part in what he called strange rituals. A French parliamentary committee expressed concerns that the esoterics may be planning a mass suicide or other significant events. French police then blocked access to the mountain.
