= 2025 Corbières Massif wildfire =

Wildfire in Aude, France

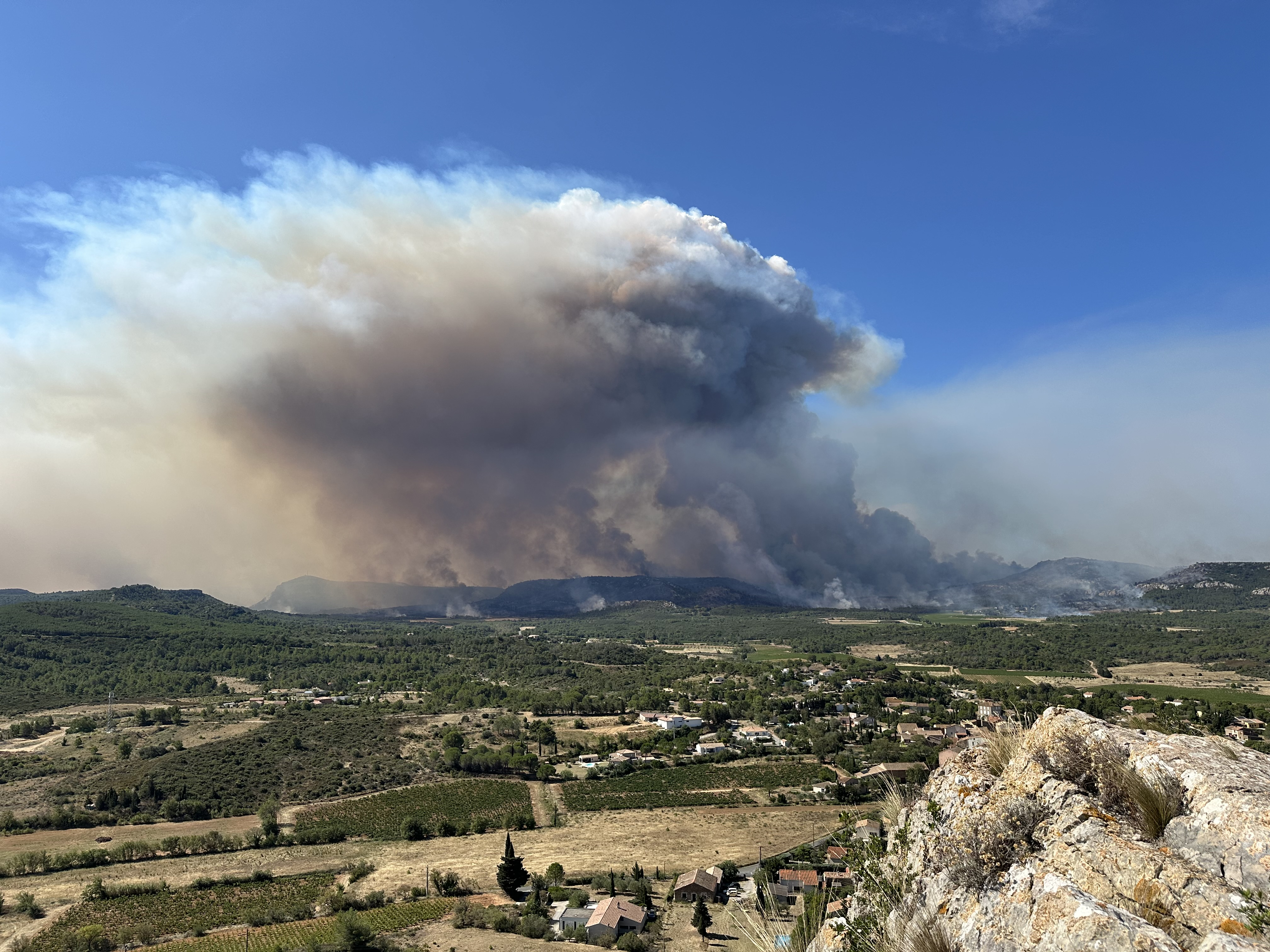
- View of the 2025 Corbières Massif Wildfire from the village of Montséret during the morning of August 6, 2025
- Location: Aude, France

Statistics
- Burned area: 17,000 ha (42,000 acres)

Impacts
- Deaths: 1

The 2025 Massif des Corbières wildfire was a major wildfire that began on August 5, 2025. It affected sixteen municipalities in the Corbières Massif, southwest of Narbonne, in the department of Aude, France.

== Context ==
On August 5, 2025, the department of Aude was placed on "red alert" by Météo-France due to the "very high" risk of fire. Météo-France forecasted temperatures of 35 °C (95 °F) and winds of 60 km/h (37 mph), warning that "in a hot and dry atmosphere, with the tramontane wind, the danger of fires will be very high in Aude this Tuesday."

This was the worst fire in over 50 years on the French Mediterranean coast according to a government database that lists wildfires in France since 1973. It was also the second-largest wildfire in France since the 1949 Landes forest fire.

== Chronology ==
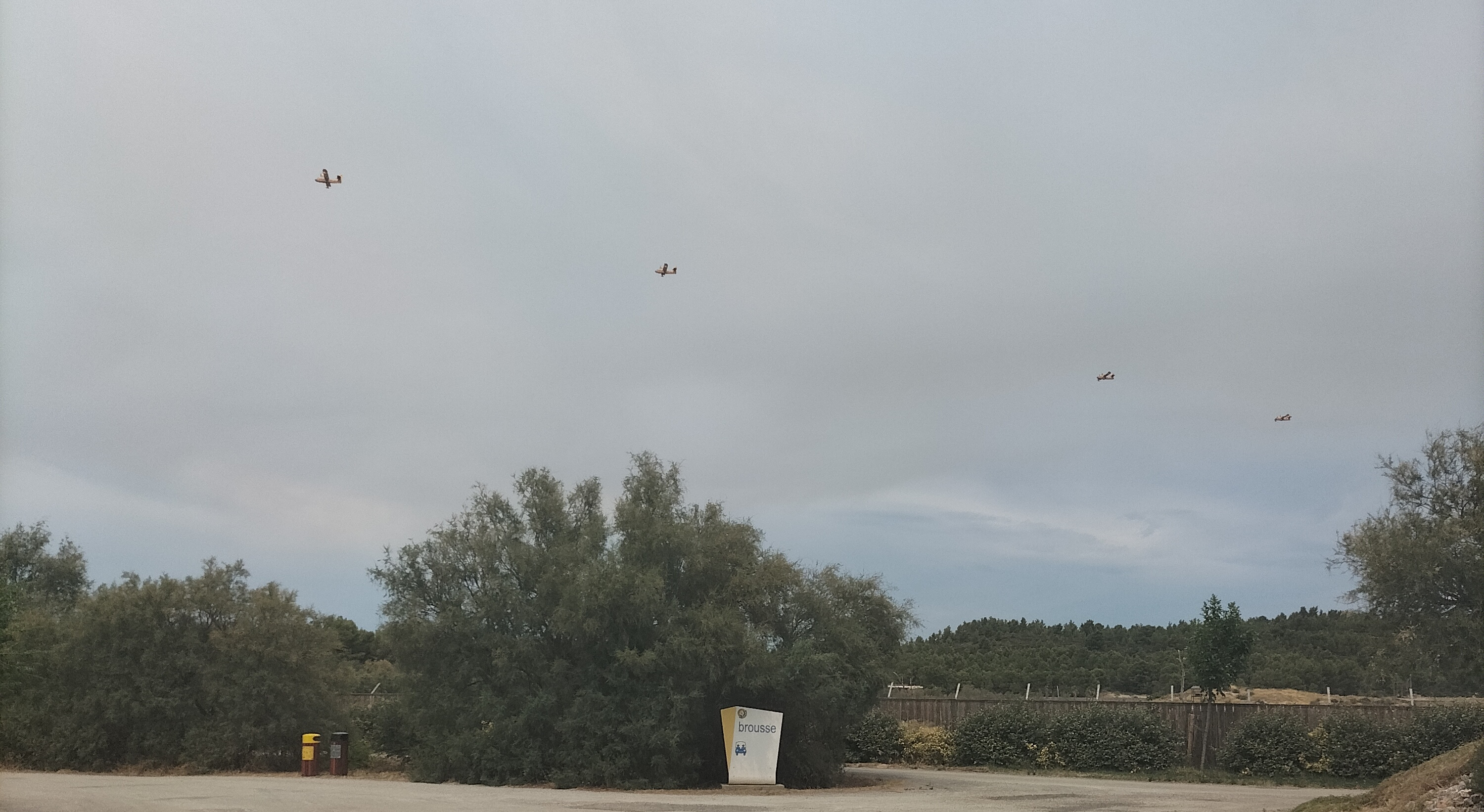
French Civil Security Canadair water bombers, on August 6, 2025, above the Réserve Africaine de Sigean going to fight the fire.

The fire started around 4 p.m. on 5 August 2025 in the commune of Ribaute. The gendarmerie estimates that it is likely of human origin. It then spread very rapidly to the southeast, fueled by a strong tramontane wind. Significant firefighting resources were deployed, including thirteen water bomber aircraft, specifically nine Bombardier CL-415s and four Bombardier Dash 8s belonging to the French state. It continued progressing, albeit slower, throughout the night.

The fire was officially declared entirely extinguished by the Aude Prefecture on August 28, 2025.

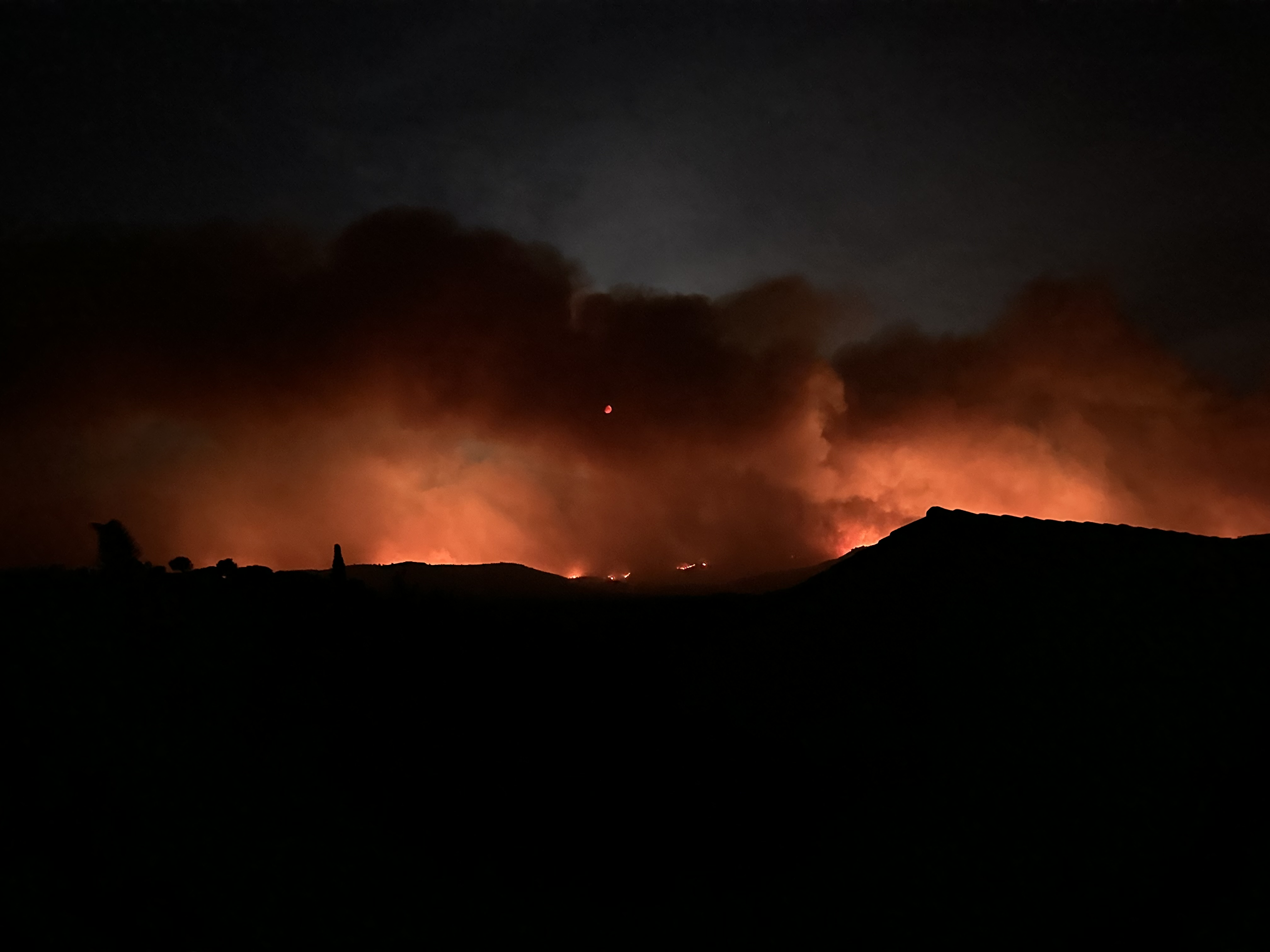
View of the 2025 Corbières Massif Wildfire from the village of Montséret during the night of August 5, 2025.

== Damage Assessment ==
The final toll of the fire is of 17,000 hectares burned. 36 houses were destroyed, and one woman in Saint-Laurent-de-la-Cabrerisse was killed.

== Investigation ==
Shortly after the fire, investigators leaned towards the fire having been started in an intentional and criminal manner, with the fire's suspected point of origin being in the woods above the road, and thus away from the immediate roadside where accidental fires typically initiate.

On June 2nd 2026, three National Forests Office officers were put into police custody in connection to the investigation on the causes of the wildfire. On June 4th 2026, one of those officers was indicted for "Involuntary destruction by aggravated arson," and the other two were released. Investigators suspect the officer accidentally started the fire by throwing a lit cigarette bud from his vehicle.

== External links & internet documents etc. ==
- «Incendie dans l’Aude : les facteurs à l’origine d’un sinistre hors norme, en cartes et en graphiques», Geographical Analysis of the Causes and Dynamics of the Fire Event Based on Cartography and Geomatics by the French Newspaper Le Monde (in French/paywall) « Le Monde »
- «Personal perception of the 2025 august wildfire in the Corbières (Aude/Mediterranean France)», Critical reflections on the Corbières Wildfire 2025 including a short bibliography of regional fire ecology & geography in « Paysages: paysages et livres – Landschaften und Bücher – Landscapes and Books », 8 August 2025
