= Montfort-sur-Boulzane =

Commune in Occitanie, France

- Commune
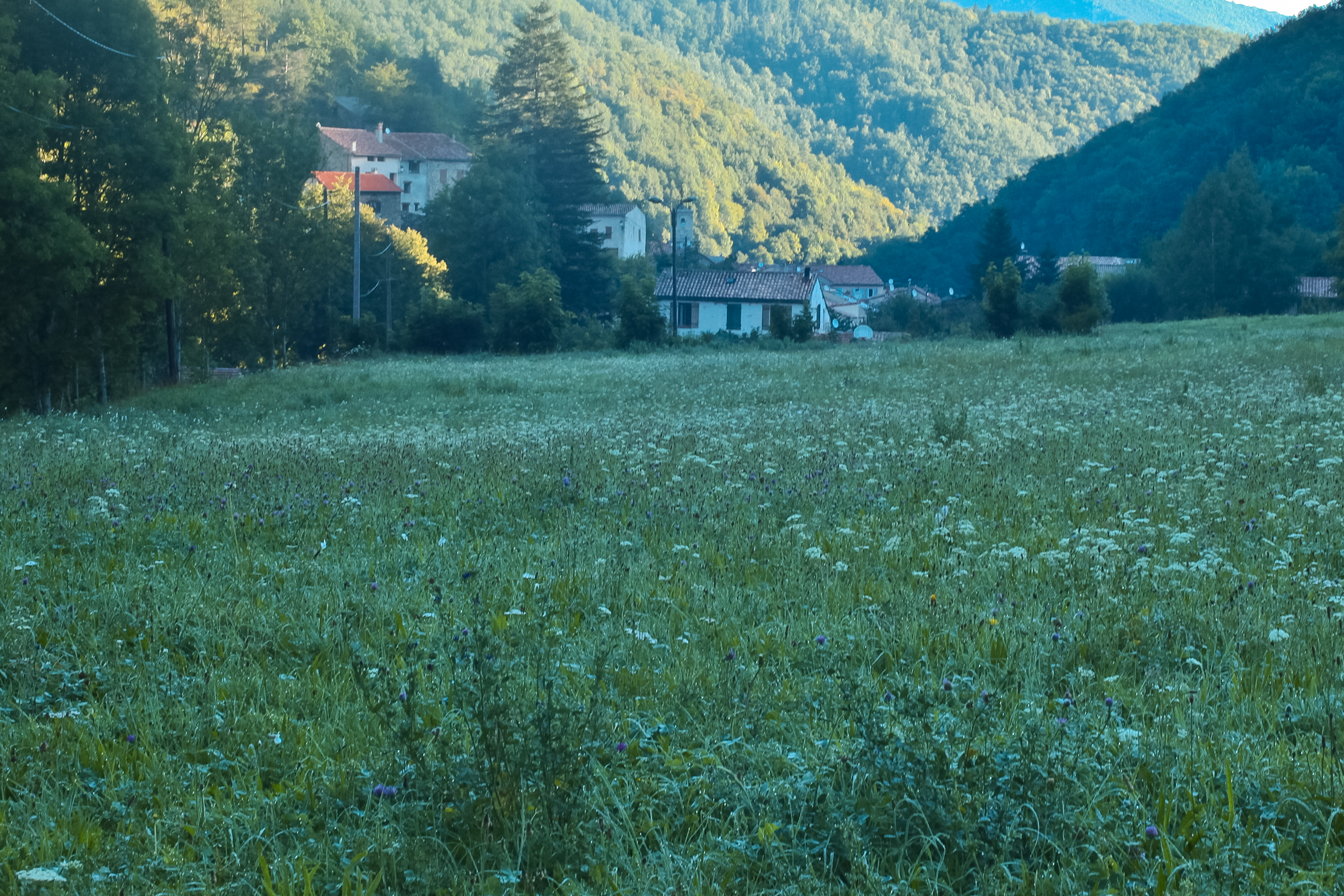
- A general view of Montfort-sur-Boulzane

- Coat of arms
- Location of Montfort-sur-Boulzane
- Location within France Location within Occitanie
- Coordinates: 42°44′37″N 2°18′31″E
- Country: France
- Region: Occitania
- Department: Aude
- Arrondissement: Limoux
- Canton: La Haute-Vallée de l'Aude
- Intercommunality: Pyrénées Audoises

Government
  - Mayor (2020–2026): Alain Renon
- Area^{1}: 33.32 km^{2} (12.86 sq mi)
- Elevation: 780 m (2,560 ft)
- Highest elevation: 1,841 m (6,040 ft)
- Lowest elevation: 639 m (2,096 ft)
- Population (2023): 87
  - Density: 2.6/km^{2} (6.8/sq mi)
- Time zone: UTC+01:00 (CET)
  - Summer (DST): UTC+02:00 (CEST)
- INSEE/Postal code: 11244 /11140
- ^{1} French Land Register data, which excludes lakes, ponds, glaciers > 1 km^{2} (0.386 sq mi or 247 acres) and river estuaries.

Montfort-sur-Boulzane (French pronunciation: [mɔ̃fɔʁ syʁ bulzan], literally Montfort on Boulzane; Occitan: Montfòrt) is a commune in the Aude department in southern France.

== Population ==
Historical population
Year	Pop.	±% p.a.
1968	112	—
1975	84	−4.03%
1982	72	−2.18%
1990	82	+1.64%
1999	65	−2.55%
2007	101	+5.66%
2012	71	−6.81%
2017	88	+4.39%
2023	87	−0.19%
Source: INSEE

== See also ==
- Communes of the Aude department
