= Boulzane =

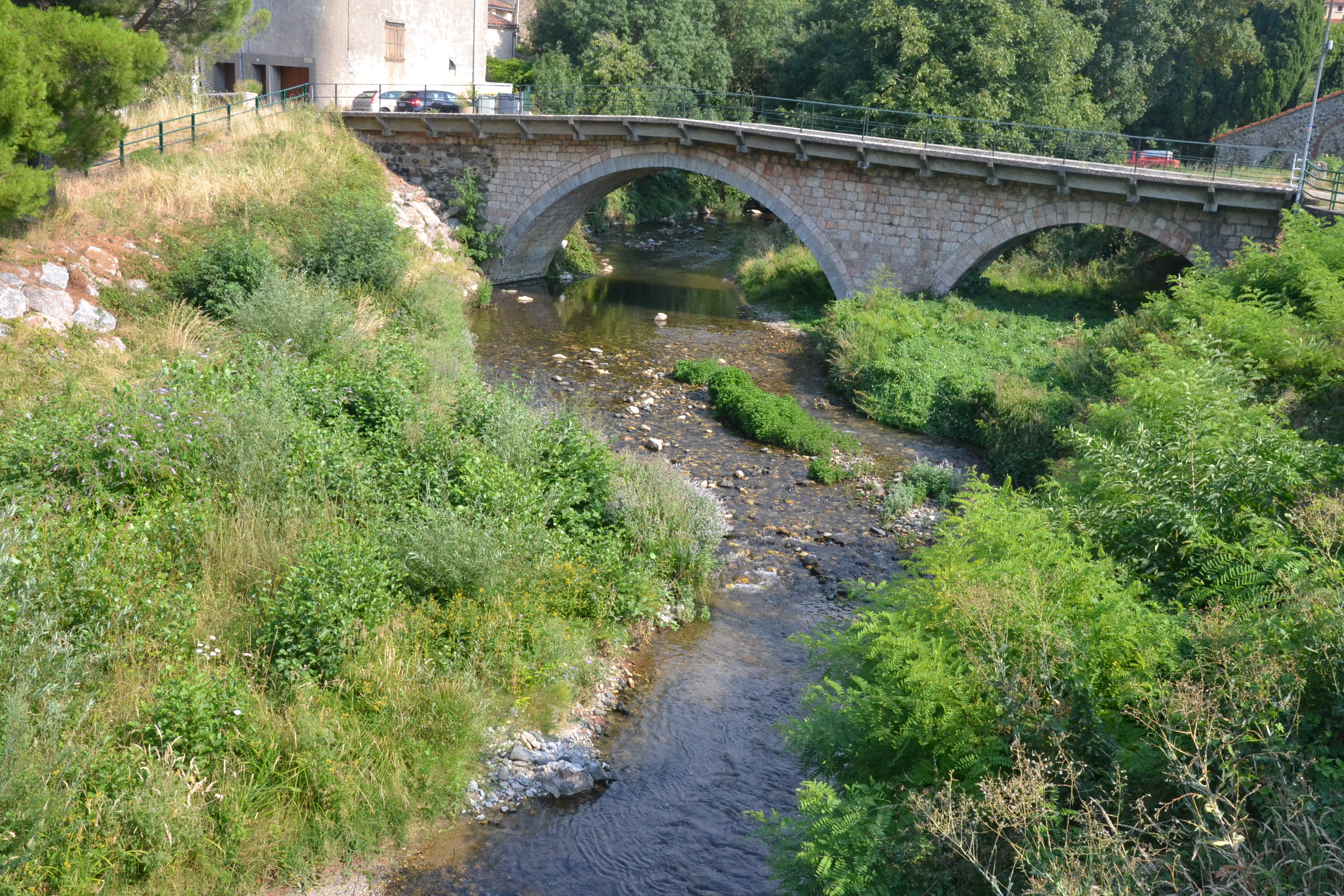

- Location within France Location within Occitanie

Location
- Country: France

Physical characteristics
- Source
  - location: Aude
- Mouth: Agly
  - coordinates: 42.802°N 2.4974°E
- Length: 34 km (21 mi)

Basin features
- Progression: Agly→ Mediterranean Sea

The Boulzane (French pronunciation: [bulzan]; Occitan: Bulzane) is a river in the south of France. It is 33.9 km (21.1 mi) long. Its source is in Aude, near Montfort-sur-Boulzane. It flows through Lapradelle-Puilaurens, Gincla, Caudiès-de-Fenouillèdes before it empties into the Agly near Saint-Paul-de-Fenouillet.

== Tributaries ==
- Babils
- Ginnesta
