= Marc Zender =

Academic background
- Education: University of British Columbia (BA); University of Calgary (MA, PhD)
- Thesis: A Study of Classic Maya Priesthood (2004)

Academic work
- Discipline: Anthropologist, epigrapher, linguist
- Sub-discipline: Anthropological linguistics; Historical linguistics
- Main interests: Comparative writing systems; Archaeological decipherment; Mesoamerican linguistics

Marc Zender is an anthropologist, epigrapher, and linguist noted for his work on Maya hieroglyphic writing. He is associate professor in the Department of Anthropology at Tulane University and a research affiliate at the Middle American Research Institute. His research interests include anthropological and historical linguistics, comparative writing systems, and archaeological decipherment, with a regional focus on Mesoamerica (particularly Mayan, Ch'orti', and Nahuatl/Aztec). He is the author of several books and dozens of articles touching on these themes.

== Education ==
Zender obtained a BA in anthropology from the University of British Columbia in 1997, and his MA (1999) and PhD (2004) from the University of Calgary. His dissertation was entitled A Study on Classic Maya Priesthood.

== Lecture series ==
Marc Zender presents a 24 lecture series entitled "Writing and Civilization: Ancient Worlds to Modernity" where he covers the anthropologic history of language reduced to writing. This The Great Courses college level course traces the origin and development of writing.

== Distinctions ==
- Peabody Museum Research Grant, Peabody Museum, Harvard University, 2010–2011
- Certificate of Distinction for Excellence in Teaching, Harvard University, 2007, 2008, 2009, 2010
- Ralph Steinhauer Award of Distinction, Alberta Heritage Scholarship Fund, 2002

== Publications ==
- 1999 Diacritical Marks and Underspelling in the Classic Maya Script : Implications for Decipherment. M.A. Thesis, Department of Archaeology, University of Calgary.
- 2004 On the Morphology of Intimate Possession in Mayan Languages and Classic Mayan Glyphic Nouns. In The Linguistics of Maya Writing (édited by Søren Wichmann, University of Utah Press, Salt Lake City).
