= Corbières Massif =

Mountain range in the Pre-Pyrenees in France

Corbières Range
- Massif des Corbières
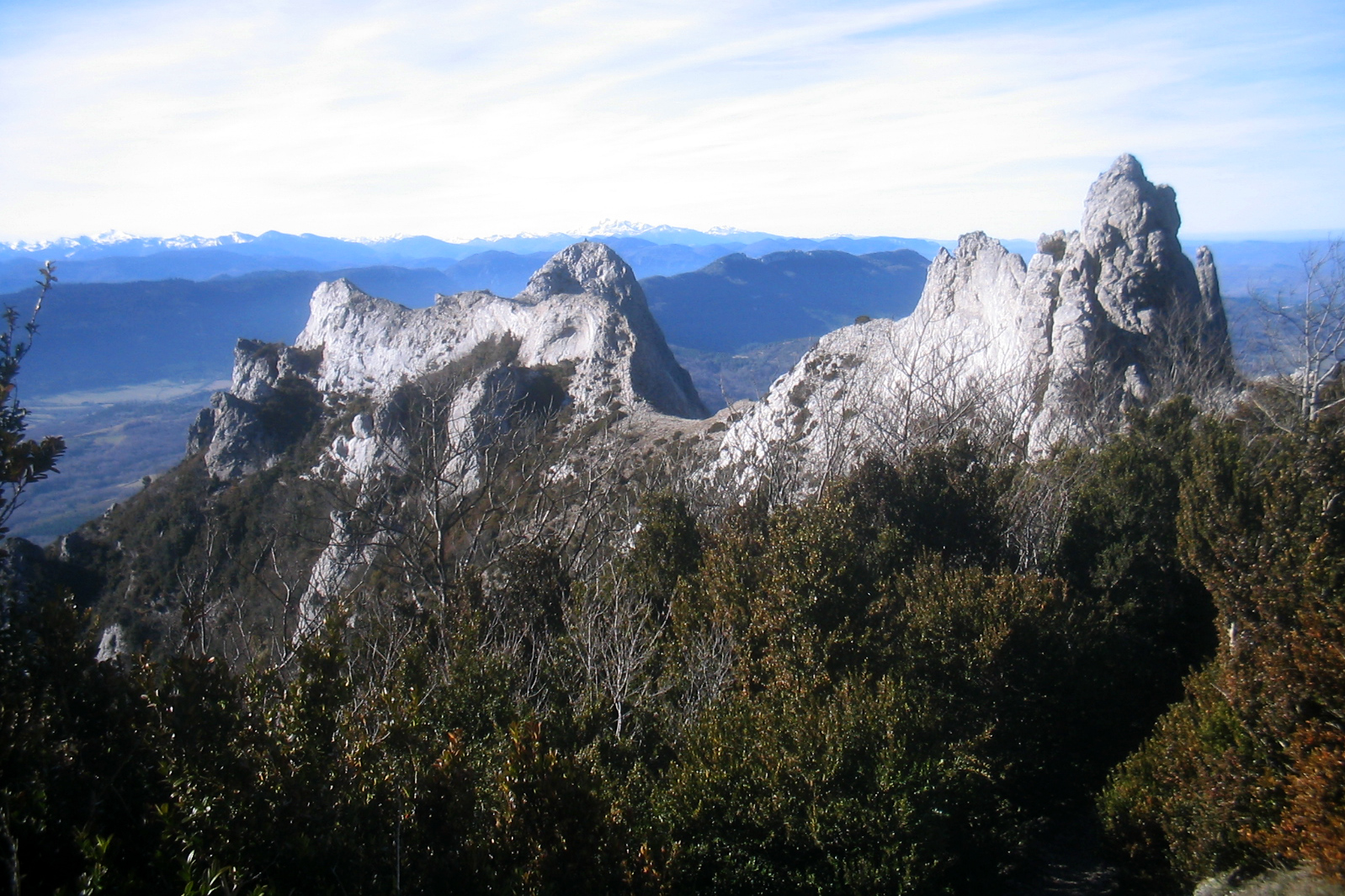
- Puig de Bugarag, highest point in the range

Highest point
- Elevation: 1,230 m (4,040 ft)
- Coordinates: 42°50′27″N 2°45′8″E

Naming
- Native name: Corberes (Catalan); Corbièras (Occitan)

Geography
- Location within Pyrenees
- Location: Languedoc-Roussillon, France
- Parent range: Pre-Pyrenees

Climbing
- Easiest route: Drive from Villerouge-Termenès, Mouthoumet, Caudiès-de-Fenouillèdes, Saint-Paul-de-Fenouillet, Quillan, Espéraza, Rennes-les-Bains or Limoux

The Corbières Massif (French: Massif des Corbières [masif de kɔʁbjɛʁ]; Catalan: Corberes; Occitan: Corbièras) is a mountain range in the Pre-Pyrenees. It is the only true foothill of the Pyrenees on their northern side.

== Geography ==
The Corbières are a mountain region in the Languedoc-Roussillon in southeastern France, located in the departements of Aude and Pyrénées-Orientales.

The river Aude borders the Corbières to the west and north, and the river Agly more or less to the south. The eastern border is the Mediterranean Sea. The eastern part of the Corbières bordering the Mediterranean and the Etangs is also known as the Corbières Maritimes; its climate and vegetation (thermo-mediterranean vegetation) are distinct from those in the western part.

The highest point of the Corbières is the 1,230 m high Pic de Bugarach.

Map of the Corbières Massif

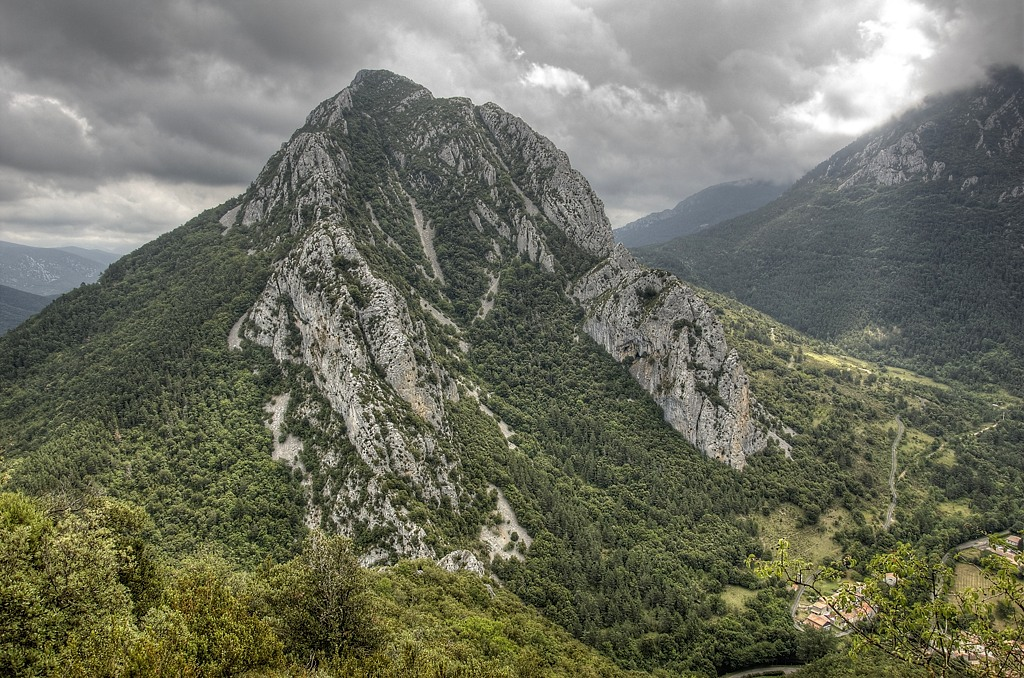
Serre de la Quière, Corbières

== History ==
In August 2025, a wildfire started in the Corbières, thought to be the worst fire in over 50 years on the French Mediterranean coast.

== See also ==
- Geology of the Pyrenees
- Pre-Pyrenees
