= Ansignan =

- Commune
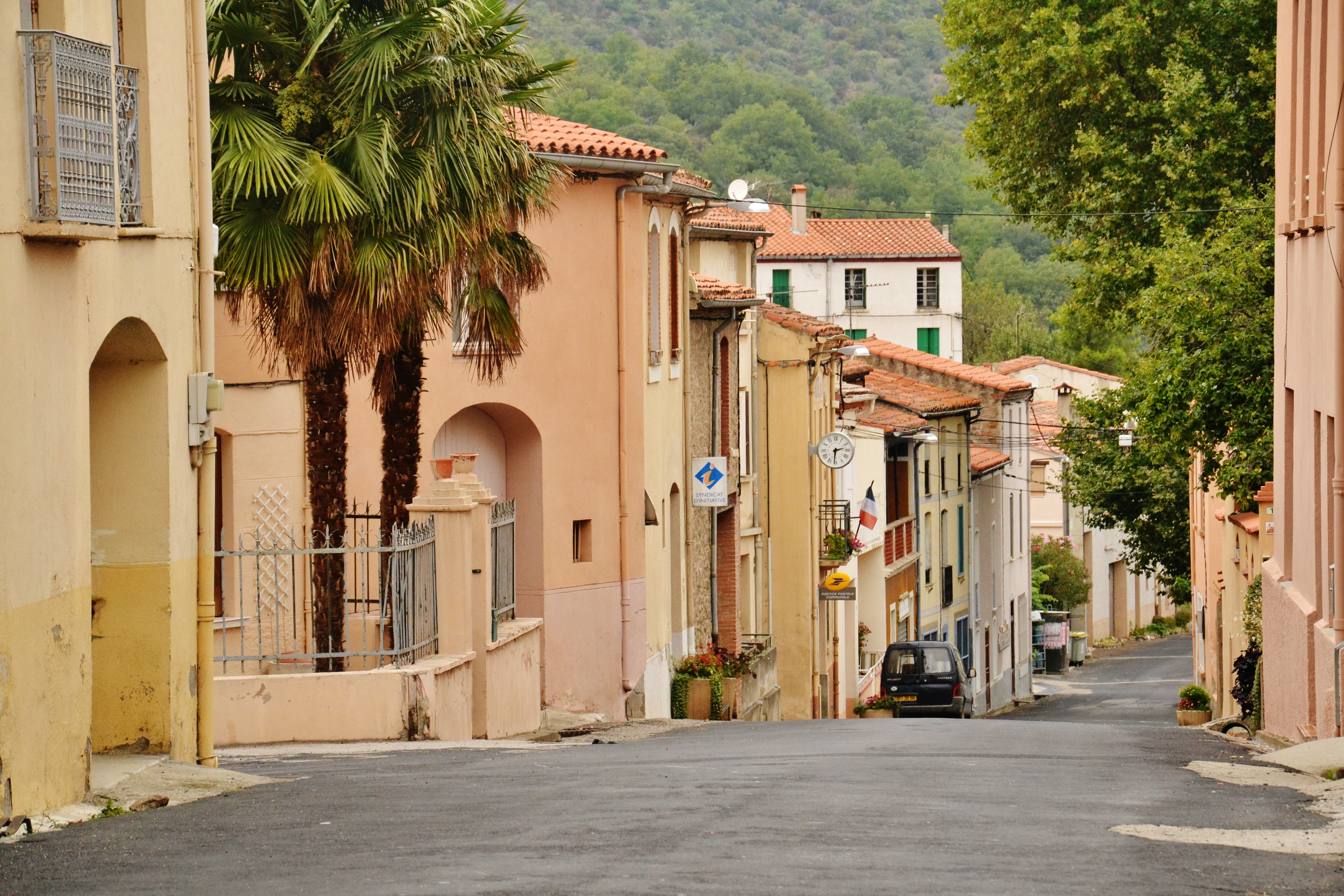
- The main road in Ansignan

- Coat of arms
- Location of Ansignan
- Location within France Location within Occitanie
- Coordinates: 42°45′43″N 2°30′59″E
- Country: France
- Region: Occitania
- Department: Pyrénées-Orientales
- Arrondissement: Prades
- Canton: La Vallée de l'Agly
- Intercommunality: Agly Fenouillèdes

Government
  - Mayor (2024–2026): David Groult
- Area^{1}: 7.84 km^{2} (3.03 sq mi)
- Elevation: 235 m (771 ft)
- Highest elevation: 583 m (1,913 ft)
- Lowest elevation: 155 m (509 ft)
- Population (2023): 164
  - Density: 20.9/km^{2} (54.2/sq mi)
- Time zone: UTC+01:00 (CET)
  - Summer (DST): UTC+02:00 (CEST)
- INSEE/Postal code: 66006 /66220
- ^{1} French Land Register data, which excludes lakes, ponds, glaciers > 1 km^{2} (0.386 sq mi or 247 acres) and river estuaries.

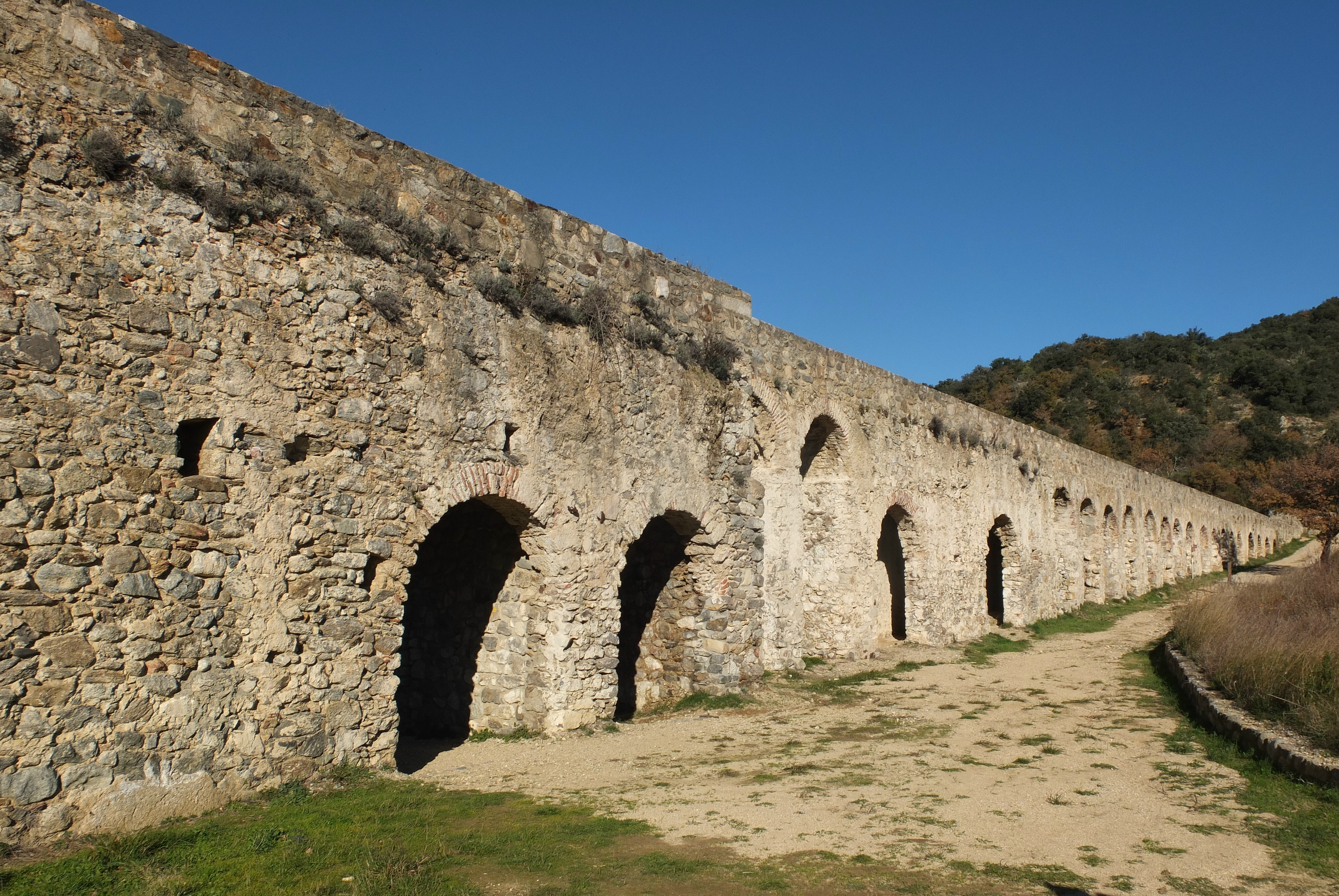
Roman Aqueduct of Ansignan

Ansignan (French pronunciation: [ɑ̃siɲɑ̃]; Occitan: Ansinhan; Catalan: Ansinyà) is a commune in the Pyrénées-Orientales département in southern France.

== Geography ==
=== Localisation ===
Ansignan is located in the canton of La Vallée de l'Agly and in the arrondissement of Prades.

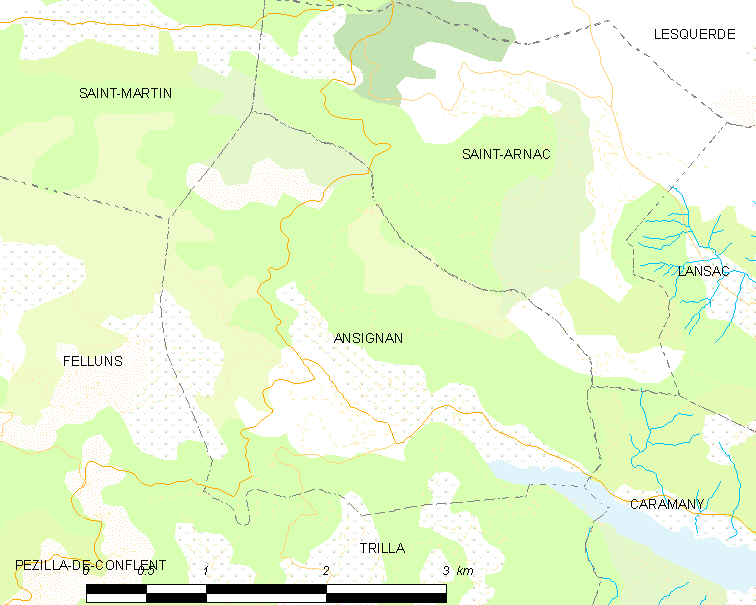
Map of Ansignan and its surrounding communes

== Government and politics ==
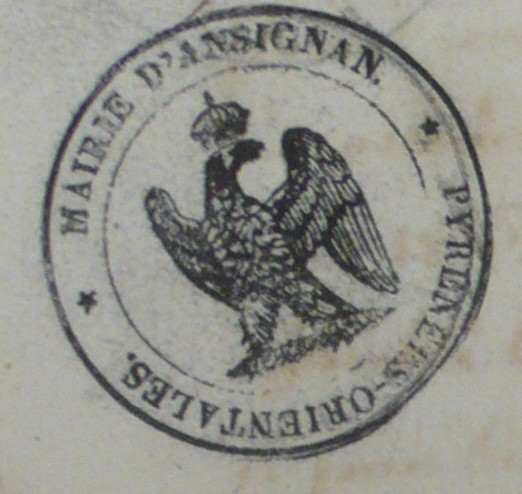
Seal of Ansignan in 1815

=== Communal administration ===
The town council of Ansignan is composed in 2014 of eleven councilors : seven men (the mayor, two deputy mayors and four councilors) and four women (four councilors).

=== Mayors ===
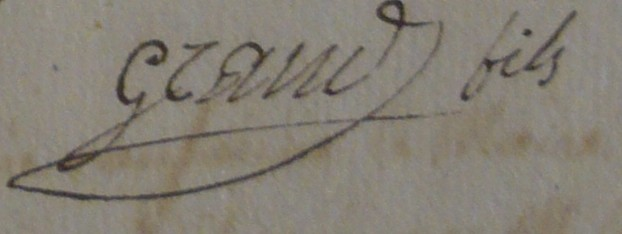
Signature of mayor Joseph Grand (Jr.) in 1815

Mayors before 1935
Mayor	Term start	Term end
Joseph Grand	1792	1795
Pierre Grand	1795	1799
Marc Babulet	1799	1801
Joseph Grand	1801	1813
Joseph Grand Jr.	1813	1815
Jean Raspaud	1815	1816
Pierre Barbaza	1816	1835
Jacques Gandou	1835	1841
Jean-BaptisteFage	1841	1846
Joseph Pratx	1846	1850
Saturnin Carol	1850	1850
Joseph Merou	1850	1850
Pierre Estève	1850	1851
Joseph Barbaza	1851	1852
Pierre Estève	1852	1856
François Bascou	1856	1865
Pierre Vaysse	1865	1876
JosephBarbaza	1876	1884
André Gelly	1884	1888
Jean-François Dauliac	1888	1895
Pierre Pech	1895	1908
Célestin Calvet	1908	1912
Jacques-Louis Pech	1912	1929

Mayors after 1935
Mayor	Term start	Term end
Etienne Bascou	1935	1977
Guy Barbaza	1977	1999
Guy Audouy	1999	2001
Mauricette Pelissier	2001	2014
Jean-Pierre Pilart	2014	2020
Jean-Philippe Struillou	2020	incumbent

== Population ==
Historical population
Year	Pop.	±% p.a.
1968	259	—
1975	225	−1.99%
1982	194	−2.10%
1990	212	+1.12%
1999	198	−0.76%
2007	184	−0.91%
2012	195	+1.17%
2017	166	−3.17%
2023	164	−0.20%
Source: INSEE

== See also ==
- Communes of the Pyrénées-Orientales department
