= Camps-sur-l'Agly =

Commune in Occitanie, France

- Commune
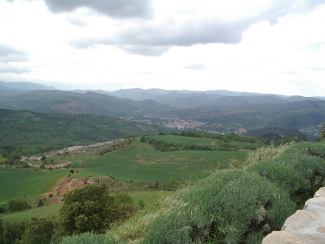
- The Plana de l'Aglin

- Coat of arms
- Location of Camps-sur-l'Agly
- Location within France Location within Occitanie
- Coordinates: 42°51′38″N 2°26′04″E
- Country: France
- Region: Occitania
- Department: Aude
- Arrondissement: Limoux
- Canton: La Haute-Vallée de l'Aude

Government
  - Mayor (2020–2026): Rolande Alibert
- Area^{1}: 26.35 km^{2} (10.17 sq mi)
- Elevation: 540 m (1,770 ft)
- Highest elevation: 1,227 m (4,026 ft)
- Lowest elevation: 445 m (1,460 ft)
- Population (2023): 66
  - Density: 2.5/km^{2} (6.5/sq mi)
- Time zone: UTC+01:00 (CET)
  - Summer (DST): UTC+02:00 (CEST)
- INSEE/Postal code: 11065 /11190
- ^{1} French Land Register data, which excludes lakes, ponds, glaciers > 1 km^{2} (0.386 sq mi or 247 acres) and river estuaries.

Camps-sur-l'Agly (Languedocien: Camps d’Aglin) is a commune in the Aude department in southern France.

== Population ==
Historical population
Year	Pop.	±% p.a.
1968	38	—
1975	37	−0.38%
1982	46	+3.16%
1990	56	+2.49%
1999	60	+0.77%
2007	83	+4.14%
2012	64	−5.07%
2017	55	−2.99%
2023	66	+3.09%
Source: INSEE

== See also ==
- Pic de Bugarach
- Communes of the Aude department
