= French Great South-West =

Region of France

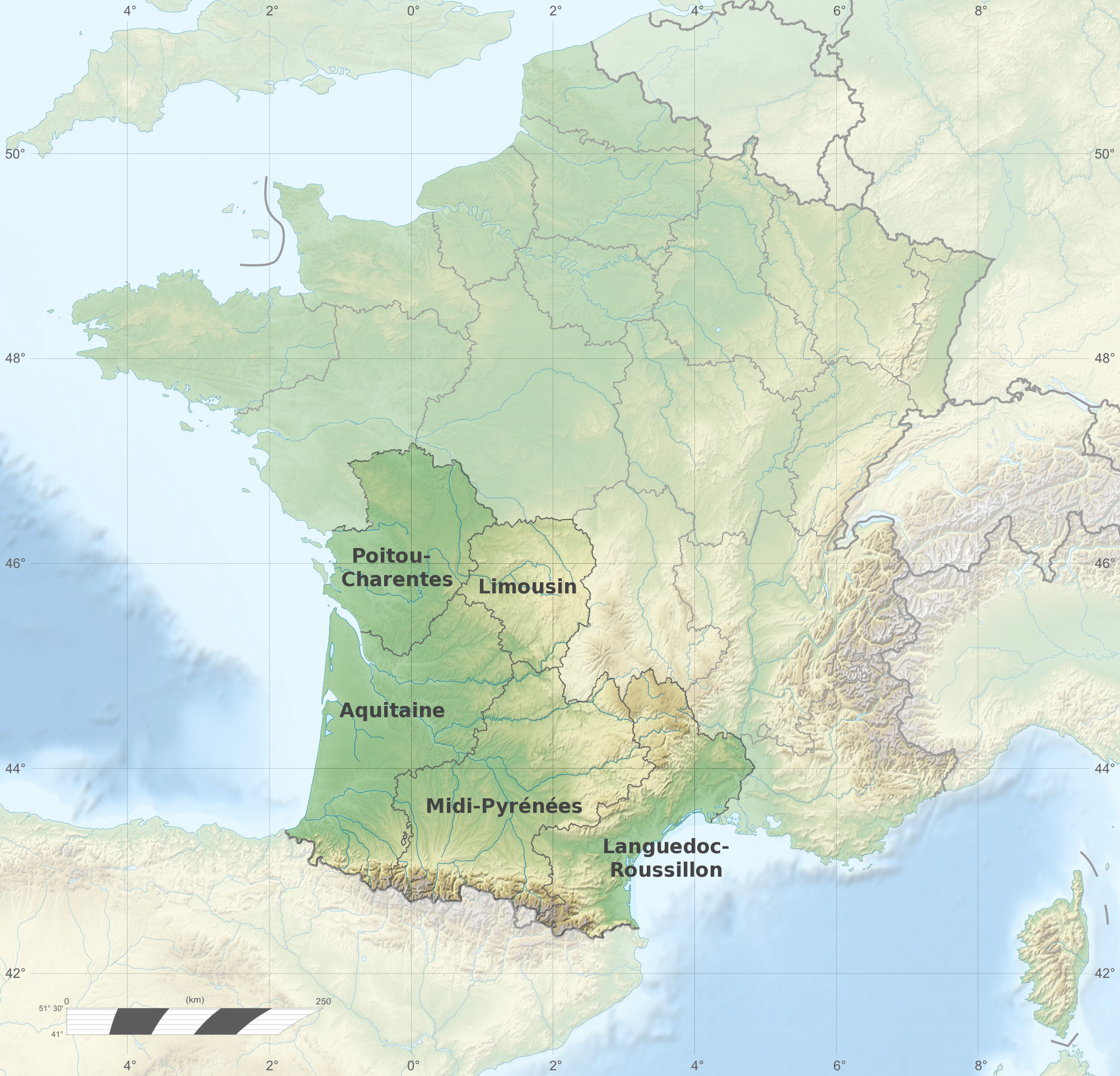
Topographic map of the five regions forming the French Great South-West before the 2016 mergers.

The French Great South-West (Occitan: Gran Sud-Oèst francés) is a geographical, sociological, economic and cultural entity bringing together the administrative regions of Nouvelle-Aquitaine and Occitanie, resulting from the merger on January 1, 2016, of five previous regions; in these two regions combined, it covers 156,000 km2, or 29% of the territory of metropolitan France. It is a grouping devoid of its own political or administrative structures, set up, with the objective of an interregional reflection on spatial planning at the level of new European issues, at the initiative of the Interministerial Delegation at territory planning and regional attractiveness.

== History ==
As Bernard Morel points out in the Revue de géographie de Lyon « territorial constructions of land use planning are inventions of "geographic objects" which are part of political strategies. »

The French Great South-West in the light of Europe.

The study programs for the French Great South-West and the French Great South-East were launched on the decision of the Interministerial Committee for Land Use Planning and Development, which met on April 10, 1997, in Auch2. An interministerial and interregional spatial planning mission coordinated by the prefect of the Midi-Pyrénées region was created at the initiative of the Delegation for spatial planning and regional action (DATAR), whose order was the study of a network of State services on the scale of the Great South-West.

This space is then made up of the two regions Aquitaine and Midi-Pyrénées, federated, on both sides of the river, by the valley of the Garonne, and associates, according to the themes, the conterminous regions of Auvergne, Languedoc-Roussillon, Limousin and Poitou-Charentes. A socio-economic diagnosis was carried out and published by the two Aquitaine and Midi-Pyrénées regional offices of the National Institute for Statistics and Economic Studies (Insee) in 1999.

Topographic map of the Great South-West.

In 2003, the Interministerial Delegation for Regional Planning and Regional Attractiveness (new name of DATAR), entrusted the revision of this study to an enlarged body in a European perspective, the study and development mission. interregional and European cooperation for the French Great South-West. The result of this reflection, carried out along three main lines:

- space and population
- economy
- space structuring

Topographic map of the Great South-West.

under the supervision of the Regional Directorate of Insee Midi-Pyrénées in collaboration with the directorates of the other four regions and in association with the State services, the prefectures of the five regions and the five regional councils of Aquitaine, Languedoc-Roussillon, Limousin, Midi-Pyrénées and Poitou-Charentes, resulted in a new publication by INSEE in March 2006.

== Geography entity ==
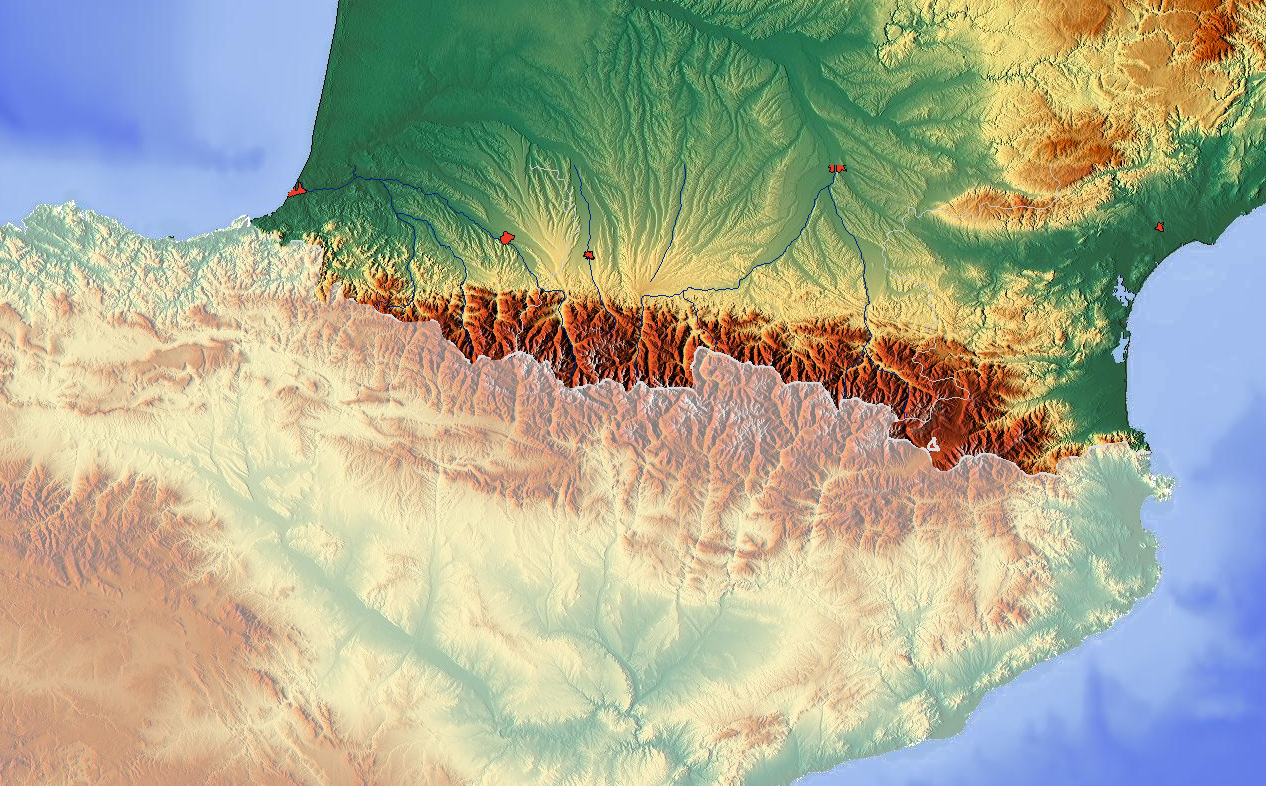
Relief map of the Pyrenees (The area belonging to the Great South-West is highlighted)

The French Great South-West, spread over 156,000 km2, i.e. 29% of the surface area of metropolitan France represented by the two regions of Nouvelle-Aquitaine and Occitanie, brings together on its territory a diversity of reliefs, hydrography and natural spaces of a great diversity. From the peaks of the Pyrenees or Massif Central to the beaches of the Côte d'Argent or the Côte d'Améthyste, passing by the fluvial plain of the Garonne or that of the Poitevin marsh or by the hilly terrain of the Gascony hillsides, its landscape is representative of the hexagonal relief.

=== Contrasting reliefs ===
==== Two mountain ranges ====
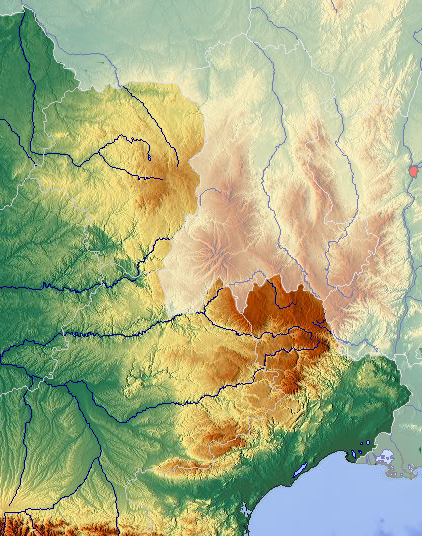
Relief map of the Massif Central.

The entire 430 km of the French side of the Pyrenees chain borders the south of the Great South-West, with several peaks over 3,000 meters: Balaïtous (3,144 m), Vignemale (3,298 m), Mont Perdu (3 248 m), La Munia (3,133 m), Pic long (3,192 m), Grand Batchimale (3,177 m), Pic Perdiguère (3,222 m), Pique d'Estats (3,144 m). The Piémont pyrénéen gradually softens its relief to merge into the Landes de Gascogne plain beyond the occidentales (western) Pyrenees. The slopes of Gascony downstream of the central Pyrenees retain some inclinations for heights, advancing the softness of their hilly landscape as far as the valley of the middle Garonne. Carved out by the Têt, the orientales (eastern) Pyrenees plunge more steeply towards the Côte Vermeille and extend towards the Aude valley stretching between Corbières and the Montagne Noire.

The western foothills and the south of the Massif Central occupy a large part of the Great South-West, of which they constitute the eastern edge. Here the altitudes are more modest (between 300 and 1,600 m): Sommet de Finiels (1,699 m), Mont Aigoual (1,567 m), Truc de Fortunio (1,550 m), Signal de Mailhebiau (1,469 m), Pic de Nore (1,211 m), Pic du Pal (1,155 m), Caroux-Espinouse (1,124 m), Merdelou (1,100 m), Mont Caroux (1,091 m), Mont Bessou (977 m), but the landscapes nonetheless remain particularly contrasted. The Limousin plateaus are hilly uplands which notably carry the plateau de Millevaches at an altitude of 900 m. In the south, the massif rises significantly in the Montagne Noire or in the monts de Lacaune, with important summits at Mont Lozère or Mont Aigoual. It ends abruptly above the plains of Languedoc. The plateaus of the Grands Causses constitute vast spaces cut by the deep canyons of Tarn, Jonte or Dourbie to the south of the massif, between Rouergue and Cévennes. The Quercy plateaus to the west are also made up of karstic surfaces, sometimes hollowed out by chasms, but are lower on the approach to Aquitaine. The plains are often narrow, like around the Causses, or form small periphery basins.

==== Two coastal areas ====
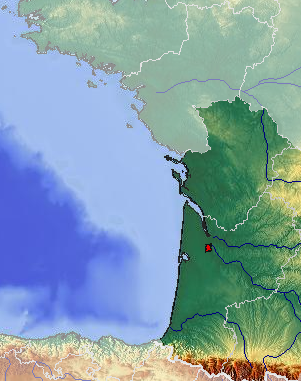
Atlantic coast.

==== Sedimentary and hydrographic basins ====
The French Great South-West includes all of the Aquitaine Basin and almost all of the Adour-Garonne Basin. On the hydrographic level, there are also certain tributaries of the Loire or the Rhône, and the basins of coastal rivers (Charente, Aude, Hérault, etc.).To the north, the Charentes are separated from Poitou by the Poitou threshold which is at the interface of the Aquitaine Basin and the Paris Basin.To the east, the seuil de Naurouze (or Lauragais) is located on the border of the departments of Haute-Garonne and Aude, on the watershed between the Atlantic Ocean and the Mediterranean Sea.

=== Climates ===
They are influenced by the relief, and the proximity to the Atlantic Ocean or the Mediterranean Sea. The Aquitaine Basin is subject to an oceanic climate. The Pyrenees and the Massif Central have a mountain climate. The former Languedoc-Roussillon region (except Lozère) mainly has a Mediterranean climate.

== Cultural entity ==
=== Languages ===
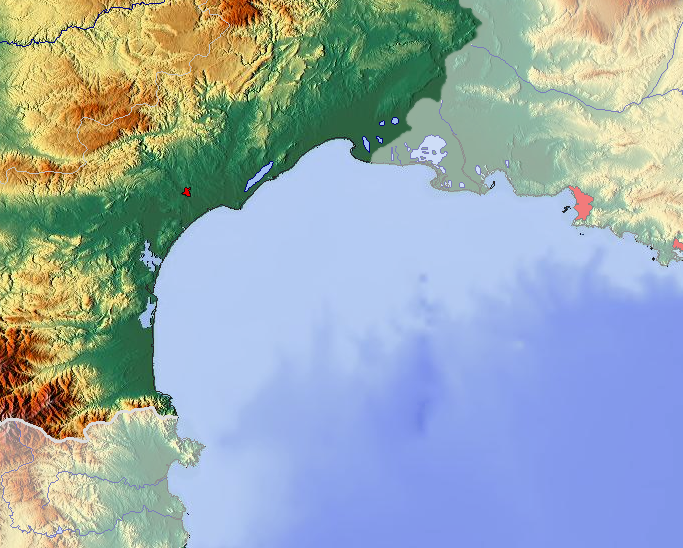
Gulf of Lion.

Several languages are spoken in the South-West. They belong to four linguistic families: Euskarian (Basque), Occitano-Roman (Occitan and Catalan) and the Oïl languages (Poitevin and Saintongeais). Basque is spoken in the western half of the Pyrénées-Atlantiques. Catalan in almost all of the Pyrénées-Orientales (a small northern fringe, bordering on Aude, speaking Occitan Languedoc); Occitan or Langue d'oc covering most of the territory (for almost all of the Occitanie region, most of the Nouvelle-Aquitaine region, namely almost all of the respective areas of Gascon, Limousin and Languedocien, part of that of Auvergne).Saintongeais is an Oïl language used in the departments of Charente and Charente-Maritime as well as in a small part of the Gironde. Poitevin is spoken in the Vienne, Deux-Sèvres, and the north of Charente and Charente-Maritime. These two languages are sometimes grouped together under the name of 'poitevin-saintongeais'. Additionally, we find certain idiomatic expressions common to a large part of the South West.

=== Sports ===
Rugby union is almost a religion in the South-West. 3 cities have won the European Rugby Champions Cup, Brive-la-Gaillarde, La Rochelle, and Toulouse. Teams like those from Perpignan, Biarritz, Bayonne, Montpellier, Castres, Bordeaux-Bègles, Pau, Auch, or Agen are very popular. Basketball is also well established, Pau-Orthez and Limoges have compiled 18 French championship titles between them.

== Economic entity ==
In the field of oncology (research, diagnosis and treatment of cancers), the Cancéropôle Great South-West aims to bring together teams (researchers and clinicians) located in the former Aquitaine, Limousin, Languedoc-Roussillon and Midi-Pyrénées regions. . The former Poitou-Charentes region is part of the Cancéropôle Great West (with the Brittany, Centre-Val de Loire and Pays de la Loire regions). Poitou-Charentes is also part of other entities (not all) of the French West: this duality may reflect the respective attraction exerted on the south and the north of this former region by different metropolises: Bordeaux in the south for the Charentes, Nantes and Tours for Deux-Sèvres and Vienne.

== Annexes ==
=== Related French articles ===
- Grand Sud-Ouest français (French Great South-West)
- Grand Sud-Est français (French Great South-East)
- Grand Ouest français (French Great West)
- Grand Est français (French Great East)

== Bibliography ==
- Le Grand Sud-Ouest, Préfecture de la région Aquitaine, INSEE Aquitaine, Préfecture de la région Midi-Pyrénées, INSEE Midi-Pyrénées, DATAR, Christiane Petibon, Catherine Meunier, Paul Ahmed Michaux, INSEE Aquitaine, Bordeaux, INSEE Midi-Pyrénées, Toulouse, 1999, collection Le Dossier, n^{o} 31, 76 p. ISBN 2-11-050106-5
- Robert Marconis, « La Revue Géographique des Pyrénées et du Sud-Ouest, de 1930 au début des années 1970 », Géocarrefour, vol. 86/3-4, 2011 (read the article online in French [archive]).

== Webography ==
- Le Grand Sud-Ouest, Insee, Directions régionales Aquitaine, Languedoc-Roussillon, Limousin, Midi-Pyrénées, Poitou-Charentes, collection Dossiers, Études, n° 133, mars 2006, document téléchargeable (document papier de 125 p.)

== Notes and references ==
- Bernard Morel, L'interrégionalité, stratégie de redéploiement territorial dans l'Europe, in Revue de géographie de Lyon, numéro 72-3, pp. 191-199, on the site persee.fr
- Communiqué des services du Premier ministre, 4 - Renforcement des partenariats, p. 2
- Le Grand Sud-Ouest, dossier n° 31, mars 1999, Insee Aquitaine
- Avant-propos par Jean Daubigny, préfet de la région Midi-Pyrénées
- Grand Sud Ouest-Français (original French Wikipedia article)

== Sources ==
- Insee
