= Lozac'h =

- Pronunciation: pronounced [loːzax]

Origin
- Origin: Breton
- Meaning: husband, patriarch, married man, head of family, farm owner.
- Region of origin: Brittany

Other names
- Variant forms: Lozach, Lozac, Lozachmeur, Lozac'hmeur, Lozech, Lozec'h, Lozec, Lozarc'h, Lozeach

Lozac'h or Lozach is a surname, and may refer to:

Lozac'h derives from ozac'h which means head of household in Breton. (cf. Ozhac'h)

- Jean Lozach - French actor featured in The Damned (1947 film)
- Pierre Lozach - French writer and actor featured in Le Boulanger de Valorgue
- Gurvan Lozac'h - French audio collector and archivist of Breton native speakers and author of Diksionêr kreis-Breizh dictionary of local Breton spoken in the region between the Monts d'Arrée and the Montagnes Noires
- SonaOne (born Mikael Lozac’h on November 30, 1988) - French-Malaysian rapper
- Véronique Salze-Lozac'h - French economist and lecturer working for The Asia Foundation
- Jean-Jacques Lozach - French politician
- Alain Lozac'h - French writer
- Pierre-Yves Lozach - virologist
- Jean-Yves Lozac'h - French pedal steel guitar player
- Jean-Marc Lozach - New York City Executive Chef
