= Côte d'Améthyste =

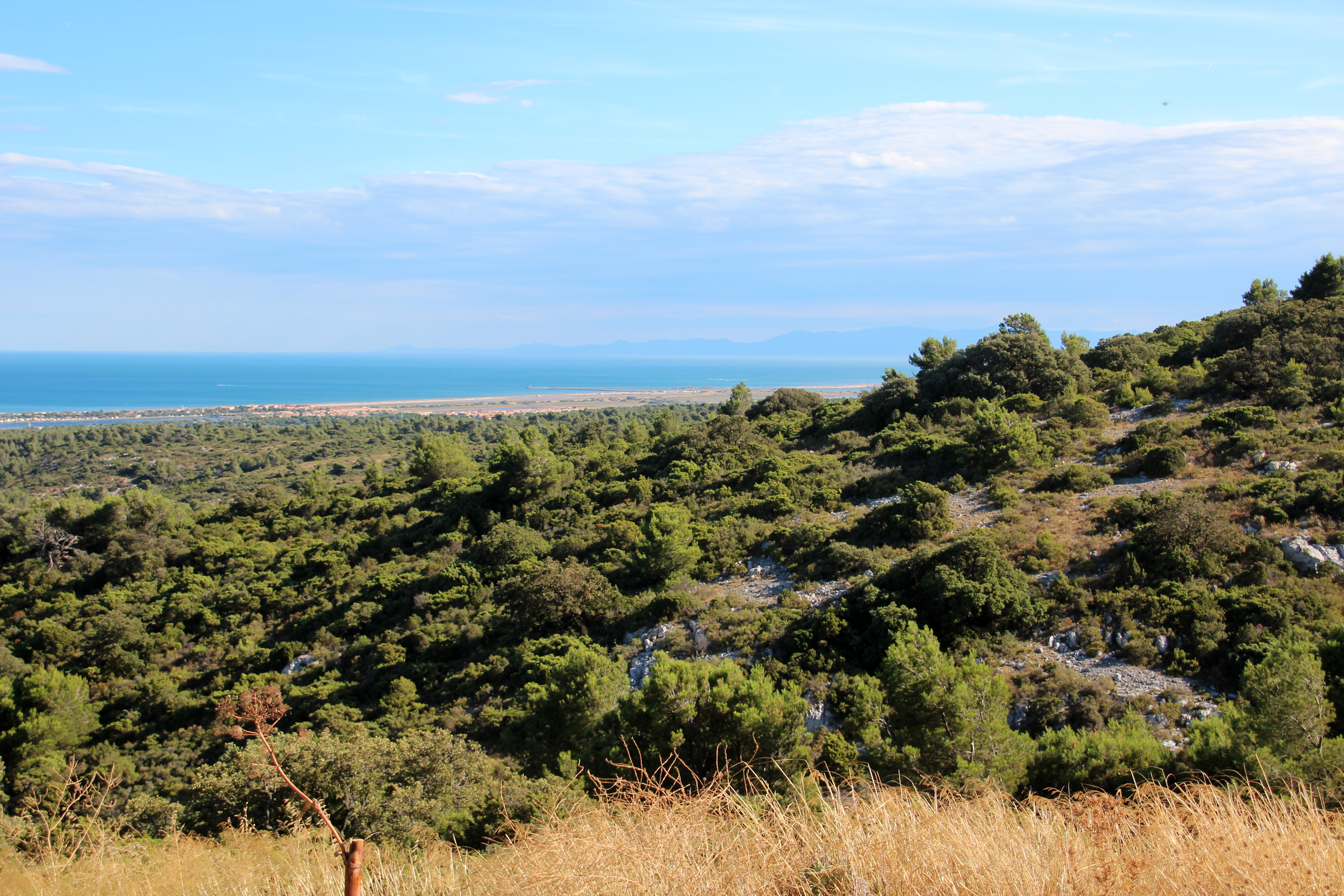
Gruissan from Narbonne plage

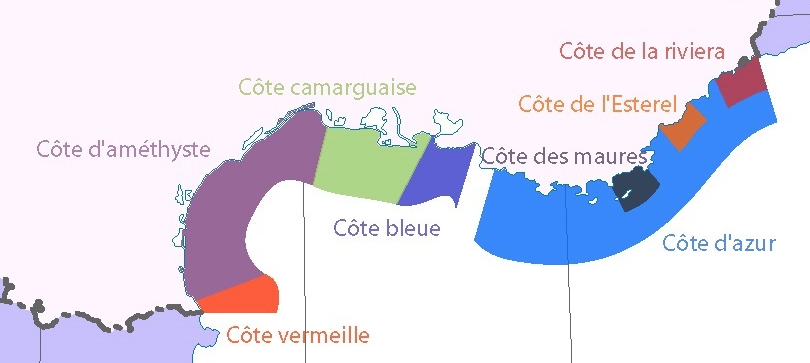
location in the South of France

The Côte d'Améthyste (French pronunciation: [kot dametist]; Catalan: Costa Ametista; lit. 'Amethyst Coast'; Occitan: Còsta d'Ametista) is a name given to most of the Mediterranean coast of the Occitanie region in France along the Gulf of Lion.

== Geography ==
The coast stretches across 180 km and includes the Pyrénées-Orientales, Aude, Hérault, and Gard departments. It is bordered by the Côte Vermeille to the south and Camargue to the east. Along it are a series of lagoons, such as the Étang de Thau, Palavas ponds, and Étang de Leucate.

== Tourism ==
Plans to develop the Languedoc-Roussillon coastline while preserving its nature, known as Mission Racine, were passed by the French Government in 1963. Resorts such as Cap d'Agde, La Grande-Motte, and Port Leucate were established. An increase in local population growth has since been reported.
