= Siege of Leucate =

1637 battle of the Franco-Spanish War

Coordinates: 42.9105°N 3.0294°E

- Part of the Thirty Years' War and the Franco-Spanish War (1635–59)
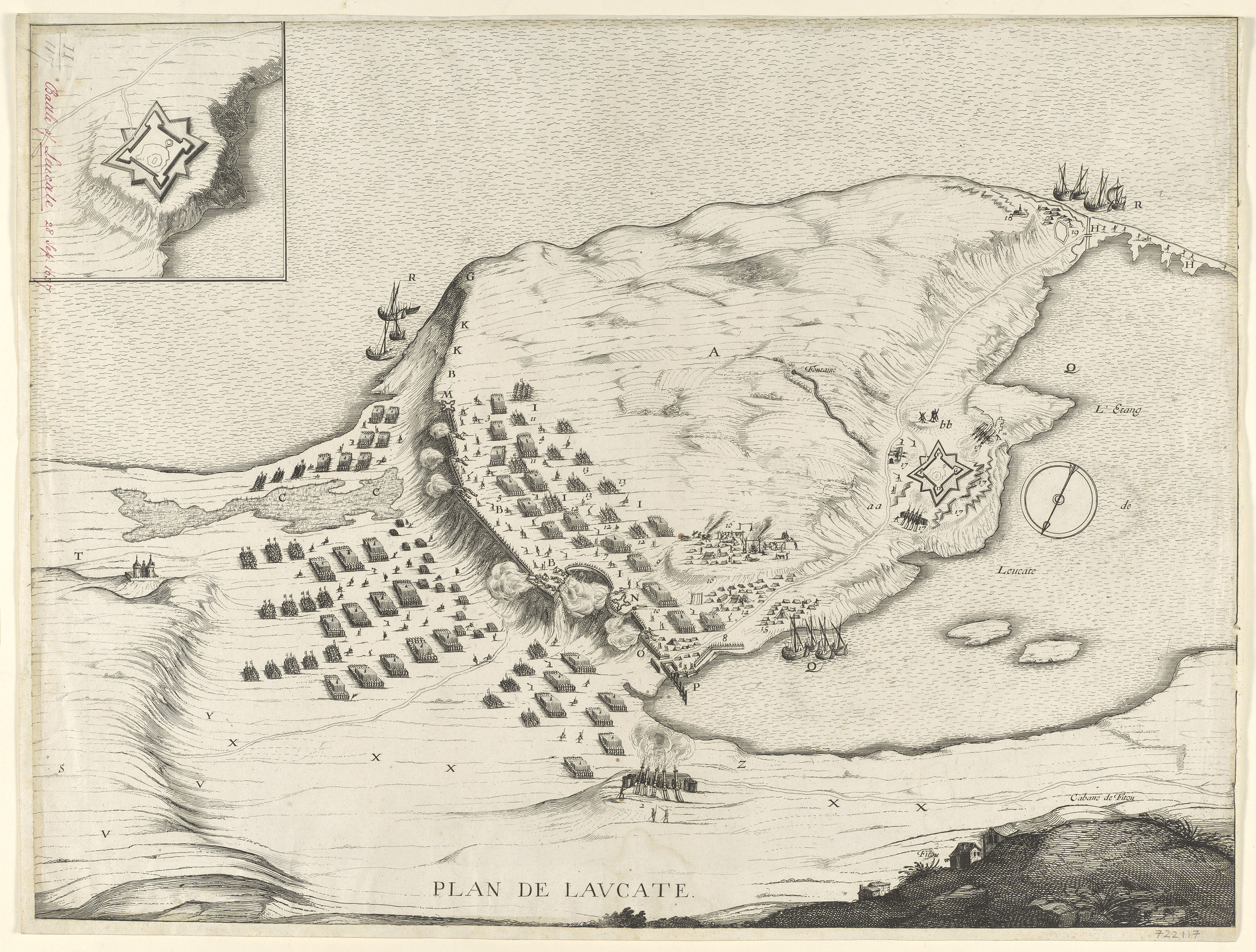
- Engraving of the siege and battle of Leucate
Date	27 August – 29 September 1637
Location	Leucate, Kingdom of France
Result	French victory

Belligerents
France	Spain

Commanders and leaders
(Kingdom of France) Charles Schomberg (Kingdom of France) Henri of Harcourt	(Spain) Gerardo de Cervellón (Spain) Juan Alonso Idiáquez (Spanish Empire) Enrique de Aragón, Duke of Cardona

Strength
20,000 infantry 4,000 cavalry 6 cannons	14,000 infantry 1,300 cavalry 37 cannons

Casualties and losses
1,200 casualties	1,500 casualties

The siege of Leucate was a battle during the Franco-Spanish War (1635–1659). It was a failed Spanish siege which ended by a defeat in a battle against a French relief army.

== Background ==
The Franco-Spanish war had started in 1635, as an extension of the Thirty Years' War. The first battles were fought in the Spanish Netherlands and Italy, while the peninsular front had only been the subject of unimportant encounters. Despite a first Spanish plan of attack beyond the Pyrenees, prepared in 1636 to facilitate the main offensive from Flanders, the offensive was not possible until 1637. Thus it was decided to invade Southern France from Roussillon, as a diversion in favor of more important theaters of war such as those of the Netherlands or Italy.

Meanwhile, the French had repaired the border fortress of Leucate and the border crossings, concentrating enough infantry and cavalry there to attack Roussillon, so the Spanish also decided to reinforce the fortresses of Perpignan and Salses with troops.

== Siege ==
By mid-1637, the regular army commanded by Gerardo de Cervellón y Mercader, Baron of Orpesa, had been assembled, and was composed of regular forces totaling 14,000 infantry, 2,000 cavalry, 34 cannons and 14 mortars.

To help the army, it was decided to raise contingents of Catalan militias using the custom of princeps namque. On 13 June, Viceroy Enrique de Aragón, Duke of Cardona invoked the Princeps namque, but it was immediately publicly rejected by the Catalan institutions as a forgery, for two substantive reasons: the custom had been invoked by the Viceroy and not by the King present in person in the Principate, and secondly, there was no war in the Principate. Therefore, no Catalan militias participated in the campaign.

On 28 August 1637, the Spanish army crossed the border. A first column of 2,000 infantrymen and 400 horses, under the command of the Marquis of Mortara, unexpectedly passed through the coastal strip and the Grau de Saint-Ange. The second column, 12,000 men and 1,200 horsemen strong, arrived from Salses via the Malpas.

On 29 and 30 August, the attackers easily took control of the villages of Treilles, Fitou, Lapalme and Roquefort, and settled in front of the fortress of Leucate, where Hercule Bourcier du Barry de Saint-Aunez, son of the heroine Françoise de Cezelli, had entrenched himself with fewer than 200 men, after setting fire to the village and filling the water tank.

However, setting up the siege of the citadel took time and caused the Spanish attackers to lose several precious days. An impressive quantity of artillery was landed on the beach of La Franqui and the Spanish fleet, anchored offshore, prohibited any relief by sea.

On 5 September, after the governor's refusal to capitulate, the intensive bombardment of the place began and quickly caused great damage, while the Spanish sappers started digging. At the same time, in order to prevent any exit of the garrison and any arrival of reinforcements, the Spanish entrenched themselves on the edge of the plateau, behind an impressive line of fortifications 2,500 meters long, built in a record time by 4,000 pioneers, aided by a large number of soldiers.

On 24 September, the French relief army, which consisted of more than 10,000 men and nearly 1,000 horsemen, was finally assembled at Sigean. After retaking the surrounding villages, the troops of Charles de Schomberg, Duke of Halluin, arrived on 28 September at the foot of the enemy entrenchments. The siege of the fortress had dragged on for more than 20 days and du Barry was at the end of his strength.

While behind, cannons were relentlessly shelling the fort, the bulk of the Spanish troops faced the French soldiers behind a line of defense that was deployed between two forts, that of Guardia and that of Cerbellon.

At nightfall, the Languedoc regiment led by the Marquis d'Ambres attacked above La Franqui, managed despite the escarpment to break through the Spanish lines and seize the fort of Guardia. In the center, taking advantage of a breach, part of the French cavalry launched itself onto the plateau which it swept with several furious charges. On the other hand, on the side of the pond, the repeated attacks failed to break through the defenses of the Olivares regiment supported by the cannons of the fort of Cerbellon. Around midnight, darkness became total and the fighting stopped, the situation remained uncertain and the French regrouped as best they could, while waiting for dawn.

In the early morning of 29 September, when Charles de Schomberg wanted to resume the fight, he no longer encountered any resistance except that of 200 Spanish veterans entrenched in the fort of Cerbellon, refusing to surrender. Under cover of darkness, the Spanish army had retreated towards Roussillon in disorder and abandoning a large quantity of weapons and equipment on the ground.

== Consequences ==
The defeat at Leucate was a serious blow for the Spanish. They were under the impression that the conquest of the fortress was as good as accomplished and plans were already being made about the next objectives once Leucate had been conquered. But now the troops had been pushed back from Languedoc and the whole expedition had been a major failure.

The loss of prestige was very great and the mutual trust between the Spanish Monarchy and Catalonia went through a major crisis, contributing to the Catalan Revolt of 1640.

The Spanish army suffered the consequences of the rout unequally. The Tercio of the Count of Orpesa had seen its command practically destroyed, while other tercios had much fewer losses. The Spanish cavalry also suffered considerably and its commander, the Duke of Ciudad Real and his son, the Count of Armayoma, were seriously wounded. In total, Spanish losses amounted to about 1,500 men killed, wounded or captured. Part of the artillery and the army's treasure chest were abandoned, and twelve standards were lost.

The French, on their side, had great losses in the ranks of the nobility of Languedoc, among them Alexandre de Lévis, Marquis of Mirepoix, who died during the encounter, as well as the Count of Aubijoux, Georges d'Amboise, the Cavalier of Suze, the Viscount of Montfa and the Lord of Autri. In total, the French had about 1,200 casualties.

For his victory, Charles de Schomberg, Duke of Halwin was named Marshal of France.

After the Treaty of the Pyrenees in 1659, the Franco-Spanish border shifted to the south and the fortress of Leucate became useless. On the proposal of the Parliament of Languedoc, Louis XIV had the castle destroyed in 1665.

== Sources ==
- Gran Enciclopedia Catalana
