= Durban-Corbières =

Commune in Occitanie, France

- Commune
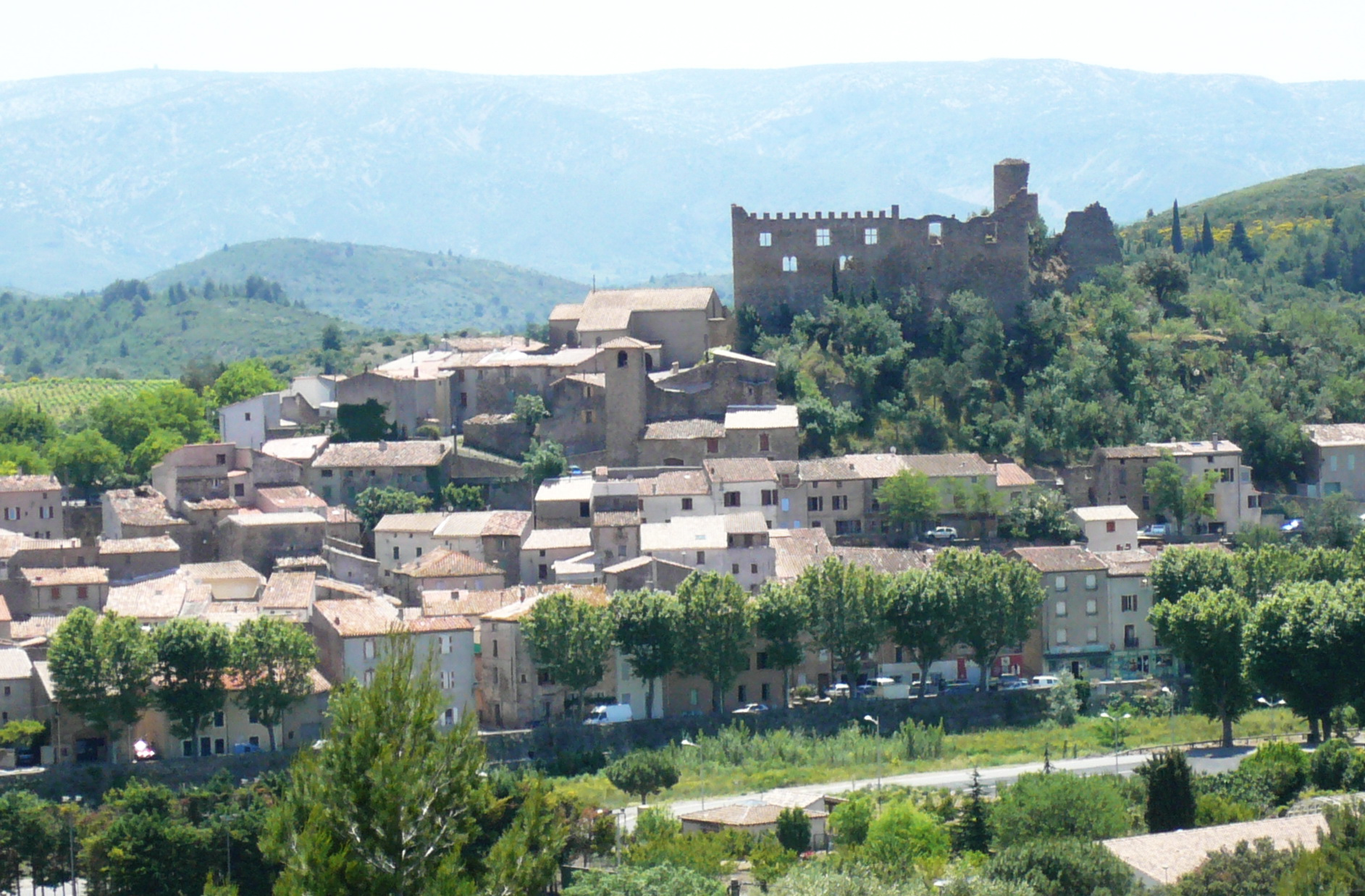
- The chateau and surroundings in Durban

- Coat of arms
- Location of Durban-Corbières
- Location within France Location within Occitanie
- Coordinates: 42°59′48″N 2°49′04″E
- Country: France
- Region: Occitania
- Department: Aude
- Arrondissement: Narbonne
- Canton: Les Corbières

Government
  - Mayor (2020–2026): Alain Laborde
- Area^{1}: 25.9 km^{2} (10.0 sq mi)
- Elevation: 88 m (289 ft)
- Highest elevation: 366 m (1,201 ft)
- Lowest elevation: 79 m (259 ft)
- Population (2023): 649
  - Density: 25.1/km^{2} (64.9/sq mi)
- Time zone: UTC+01:00 (CET)
  - Summer (DST): UTC+02:00 (CEST)
- INSEE/Postal code: 11124 /11360
- ^{1} French Land Register data, which excludes lakes, ponds, glaciers > 1 km^{2} (0.386 sq mi or 247 acres) and river estuaries.

Durban-Corbières (French pronunciation: [dyʁbɑ̃ kɔʁbjɛʁ]; Occitan: Durban de las Corbièras) is a commune in the Aude department in southern France.

== Population ==
Historical population
Year	Pop.	±% p.a.
1968	686	—
1975	564	−2.76%
1982	525	−1.02%
1990	673	+3.15%
1999	650	−0.39%
2007	684	+0.64%
2012	670	−0.41%
2017	649	−0.63%
2023	649	+0.00%
Source: INSEE

== Sights ==
- Jardin botanique Méditerrannéen

== Climate ==
Climate data for Durban-Corbières (1991-2020 normals, extremes 1989-present)
Month	Jan	Feb	Mar	Apr	May	Jun	Jul	Aug	Sep	Oct	Nov	Dec	Year
Record high °C (°F)	25.1 (77.2)	26.9 (80.4)	29.0 (84.2)	32.2 (90.0)	37.8 (100.0)	42.3 (108.1)	41.8 (107.2)	43.3 (109.9)	40.8 (105.4)	32.0 (89.6)	28.2 (82.8)	23.6 (74.5)	43.3 (109.9)
Mean daily maximum °C (°F)	11.6 (52.9)	12.6 (54.7)	15.9 (60.6)	18.5 (65.3)	22.2 (72.0)	26.8 (80.2)	29.7 (85.5)	29.6 (85.3)	25.3 (77.5)	20.6 (69.1)	15.2 (59.4)	12.2 (54.0)	20.0 (68.0)
Daily mean °C (°F)	7.5 (45.5)	8.1 (46.6)	10.9 (51.6)	13.4 (56.1)	17.0 (62.6)	21.1 (70.0)	23.7 (74.7)	23.6 (74.5)	19.8 (67.6)	16.0 (60.8)	11.2 (52.2)	8.2 (46.8)	15.0 (59.0)
Mean daily minimum °C (°F)	3.5 (38.3)	3.7 (38.7)	6.0 (42.8)	8.2 (46.8)	11.7 (53.1)	15.4 (59.7)	17.7 (63.9)	17.7 (63.9)	14.3 (57.7)	11.4 (52.5)	7.1 (44.8)	4.1 (39.4)	10.1 (50.2)
Record low °C (°F)	−7.1 (19.2)	−7.3 (18.9)	−8.4 (16.9)	−2.0 (28.4)	2.2 (36.0)	6.4 (43.5)	9.4 (48.9)	8.0 (46.4)	3.9 (39.0)	−1.2 (29.8)	−8.5 (16.7)	−7.9 (17.8)	−8.5 (16.7)
Average precipitation mm (inches)	78.7 (3.10)	57.3 (2.26)	56.5 (2.22)	67.6 (2.66)	54.2 (2.13)	25.7 (1.01)	17.2 (0.68)	23.5 (0.93)	50.4 (1.98)	101.2 (3.98)	101.3 (3.99)	67.4 (2.65)	701.0 (27.60)
Average precipitation days (≥ 1.0 mm)	6.9	5.6	6.5	7.1	6.3	3.8	3.0	3.5	4.7	6.1	6.6	6.2	66.2
Source: Meteociel

== See also ==
- Château de Durban
- Corbières AOC
- Communes of the Aude department
