= Françoise de Cezelli =

French war hero (1558–1615)

Françoise de Cezelly
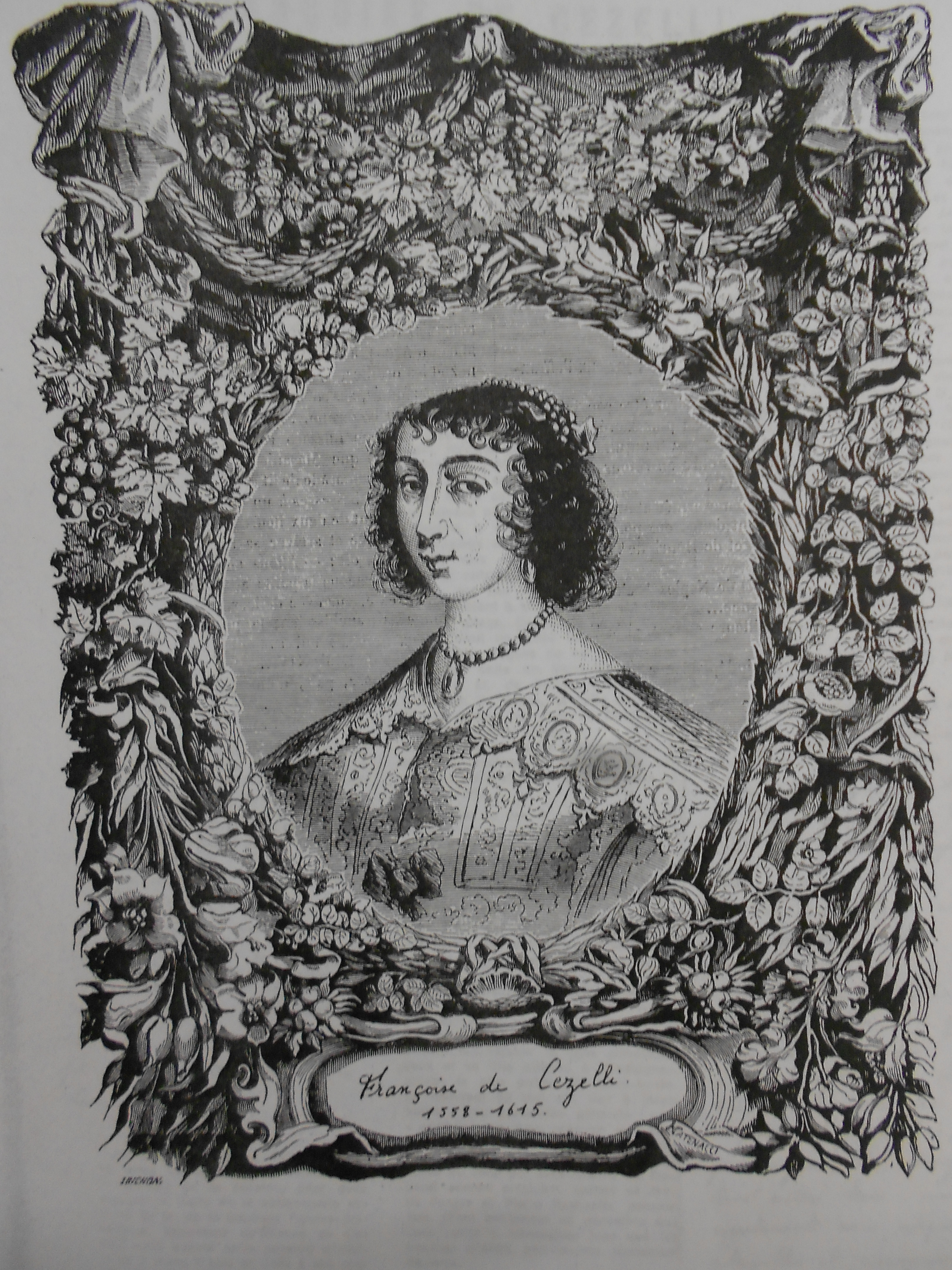
- Born: 1558; Montpellier, France
- Died: 16 October 1615 (aged 56–57); Montpellier, France
- Burial place: Chapel of St. Anne Church of St. Paul of Narbonne
- Known for: French war hero
- Spouse: Jean de Boursiez
- Children: Five

Françoise de Cezelly (1558 – 16 October 1615) was a French war heroine during the French Wars of Religion. She distinguished herself when the village of Leucate was besieged by Spanish forces allied with the Catholic League in 1590, after her husband, the governor, was captured and executed by the enemy.

== Life ==
She was born in 1558 in Montpellier. She was the daughter of the director of the Bureau of Accounts of Montpellier and niece of the governor of Leucate. On 6 April 1577 she married Jean de Boursiez, seigneur de Pantnaut de Barri, with whom she had five children: Hercule, Anne-Françoise, Antoine, Paul and Frances.

After the battle of 1590, King Henry IV made Françoise the governor of Leucate until her son Hercule came of age. She died in Montpellier in 1614, aged 56, and was buried next to her husband in the chapel of St. Anne Church of St. Paul of Narbonne.

In 1899 a bronze statue of her by the sculptor Paul Ducuing was erected in the Place de la République in Leucate, holding up the keys to the village. In May 1942 the Vichy government ordered the statue to be taken down, and the bronze sent to Germany. When the statue was lifted onto a truck, the hand holding the keys broke off. It is still kept in the Town Hall. A new statue was set up on 17 August 1975.

Her son Hercule successfully defended the Fortress of Leucate during the Siege of Leucate in 1637.
