= Phare du Cap Leucate =

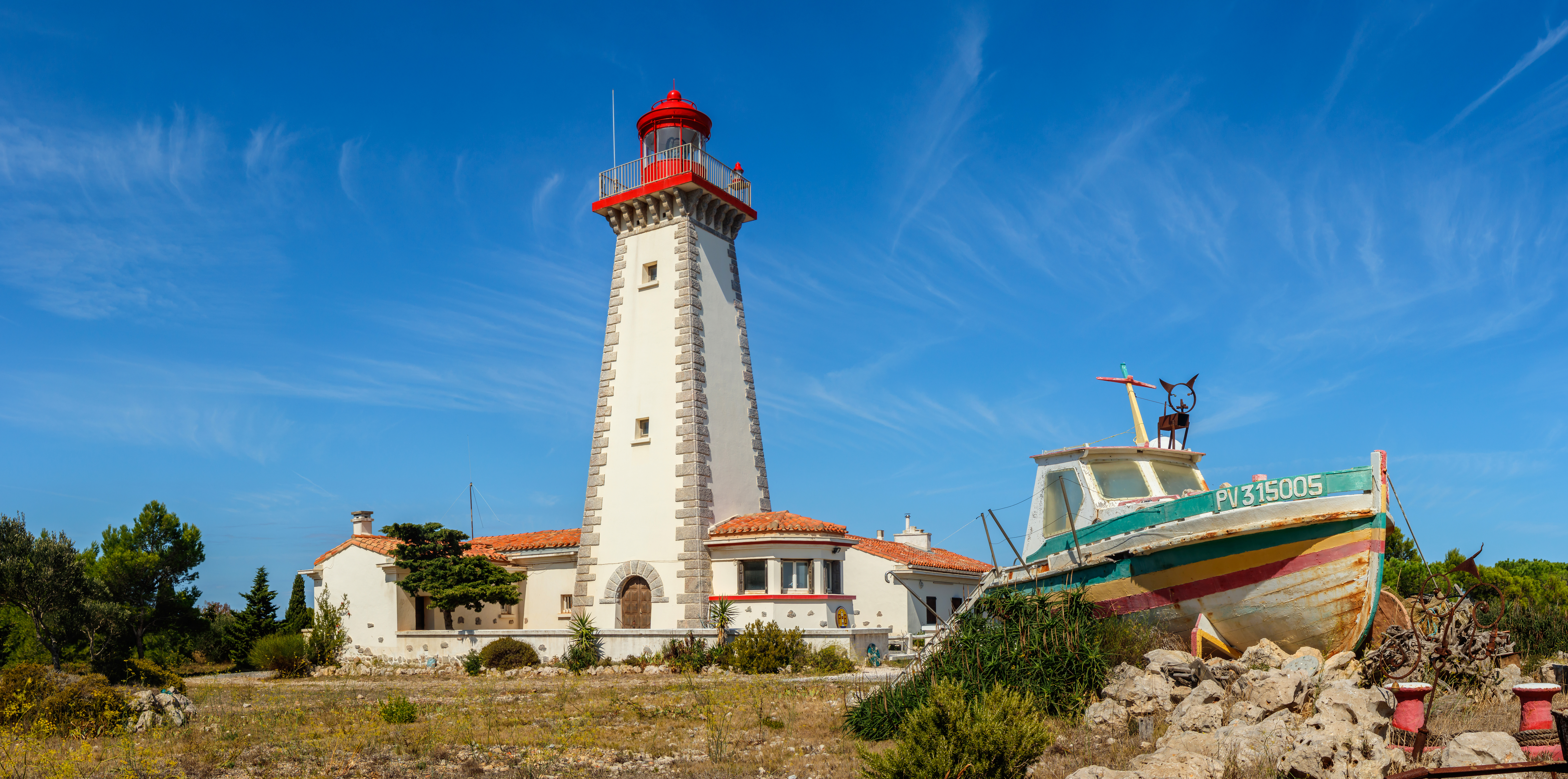
- Cap Leucate
- Location: Cap Leucate, Leucate, Aude, France.
- Coordinates: 42°54′38.0″N 003°03′21.3″E

Tower
- Constructed: 1951
- Construction: masonry tower
- Height: 19.4 metres (64 ft)
- Shape: square tower with balcony and lantern
- Markings: white tower with unpainted trim, red lantern
- Heritage: listed in the general inventory of cultural heritage

Light
- Focal height: 68.3 metres (224 ft)
- Intensity: 180 W
- Range: 20 nautical miles (37 km)
- Characteristic: Fl (2)W 10s.
- France no.: FR-1293

The Phare du Cap Leucate is a lighthouse situated on the Cap Leucate, located in the south-eastern part of the Corbières maritimes in the French Department Aude on the territory of the commune of Leucate. It was constructed in 1950 and illuminated in 1951. It is an automatic but guarded lighthouse; visits are not permitted. The tower is 19.4 m high.

== See also ==
- List of lighthouses in France
