= Charles de Schomberg =

French soldier (1601–1656)

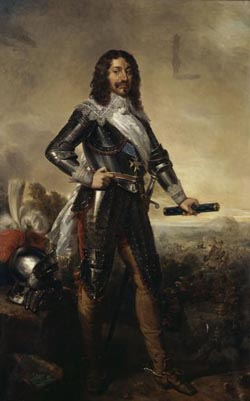
Charles de Schomberg by Jean-Sébastien Rouillard

Charles de Schomberg (16 February 1601 – 6 June 1656), Duke d'Halluin, was a French soldier from the 17th century and Marshal of France.

== Biography ==
Charles de Schomberg was the son of Henri de Schomberg, also a Marshal of France, and his first wife Françoise d'Espinay.

He distinguished himself at the siege of Sommières in 1622, where he was wounded, and at the capture of Privas in 1629. He followed the King in his campaign against Savoy and was wounded at the siege of Rouvroy-en-Barrois in 1632. He was made a Knight of the Order of the Holy Spirit in 1633.

Charles de Schomberg is best known for his victory against the Spanish at the Siege of Leucate on 28 September 1637. Following this victory, he was made a Marshal of France. He was Governor of Languedoc between 1633 and 1644. Then he became Governor of the Citadel of Metz and of the Trois-Évêchés between 1644 and his death in 1656.
He was also Colonel-general of the Cent-Suisses et Grisons between 1647 and 1656.

He first married Anne, Duchess d'Halluin, who had divorced Henry de Nogaret de La Valette. This made him Duke of Halluin, but Henry de Nogaret de La Valette also kept his title, which led to complicated situations at the French Court.

Anne died without children in November 1641. Charles de Schomberg remarried on 24 September 1646 with Marie de Hautefort (1616–1691), Lady-in-waiting of Queen Anne of Austria and former confidante of King Louis XIII.
They had no children.
