= Jardin botanique Méditerrannéen =

Botanical garden in Aude, France

The Jardin botanique Méditerrannéen, also known as the Jardin botanique à Durban-Corbières, is a privately owned botanical garden that contains more than 500 species of plants from the Mediterranean Basin. It is located on the Route d'Albas in Durban-Corbières, Aude, Languedoc-Roussillon, France, and is open daily; an admission fee is charged.

== See also ==
- List of botanical gardens in France
