= André Héléna =

French writer (1919–1972)

André Héléna (8 April 1919 – 18 November 1972) was a French writer who spent most of his life in Leucate (southern France) on the mediterranean coast. He was born in Narbonne and died at Leucate, aged 53.

== Bibliography ==
- Les flics ont toujours raison (Cops Can't be Wrong)
- Le Bon Dieu s’en fout (God doesn't Give a Damn)
- Le Goût du sang (The Taste of Blood)
- Le Baiser à la veuve (A Kiss for the Widow)
- Les Salauds ont la vie dure (Bastards are Hard to Kill)
- Les Clients du Central Hôtel (The Guests of the Central Hotel)
- Par mesure de silence (To Ensure Silence).

Some of Héléna's novels were translated into English and German.

In France, Héléna's work had more or less fallen into oblivion outside of Leucate, until a comic strip by Jacques Hiron and Jean - Michel Arroyo recently brought it back to light.

== International reception ==
Héléna's writings were translated into English and German. In German he is considered as one of the founding fathers of the 20th century roman noir.
