= Étang de Leucate =

Étang de Leucate Étang de Salses
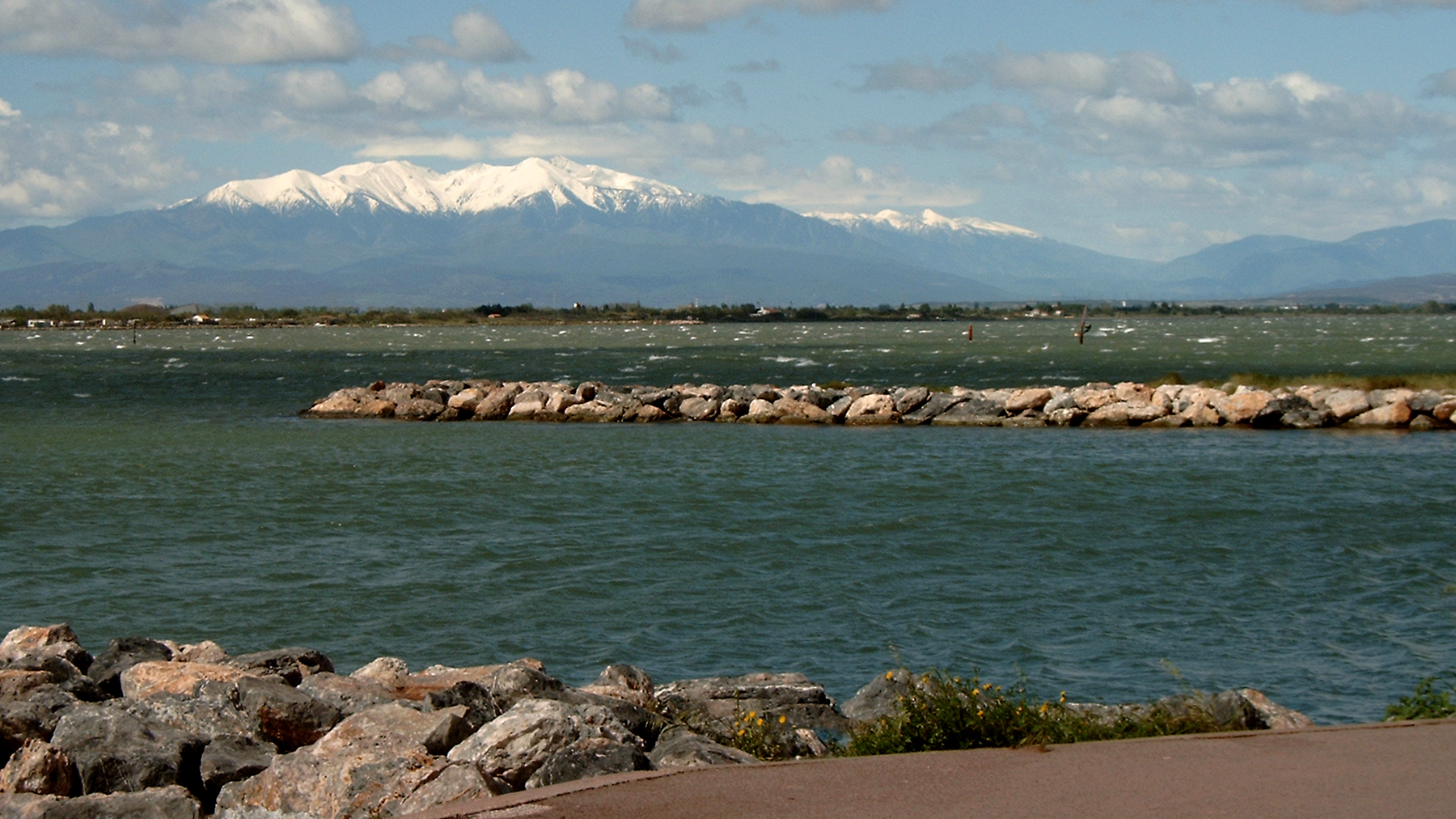

- Location within Pyrenees
- Location: Pyrénées-Orientales and Aude
- Coordinates: 42.847678°N 2.996349°E
- Type: lagoon
- Basin countries: France
- Surface area: 54 km^{2} (21 sq mi)
- Average depth: 1.8 m (5 ft 11 in)
- Surface elevation: 0 m (0 ft)

Ramsar Wetland
- Official name: Étang de Salses-Leucate
- Designated: 30 June 2017
- Reference no.: 2307

Étang de Leucate or Étang de Salses is a lake in Pyrénées-Orientales and Aude, France. At an elevation of 0 m, its surface area is 54 km^{2}. It has been designated as a protected Ramsar site since 2017. It is separated from the Mediterranean Sea by a narrow strip of land, occupied by the villages of Leucate and Le Barcarès.

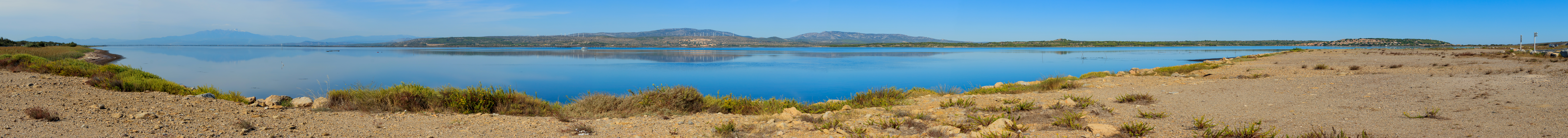
View from East

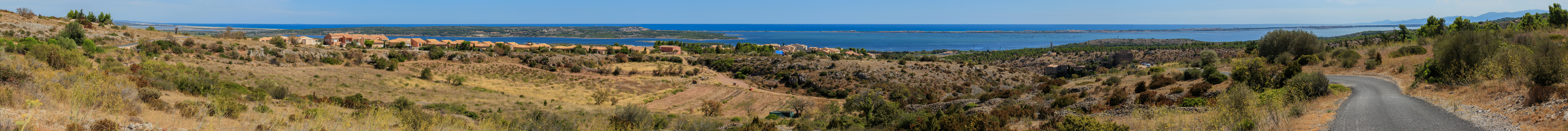
View from West

== See also ==
- Corbières Massif
