= Signal de Mailhebiau =

Mountain in France

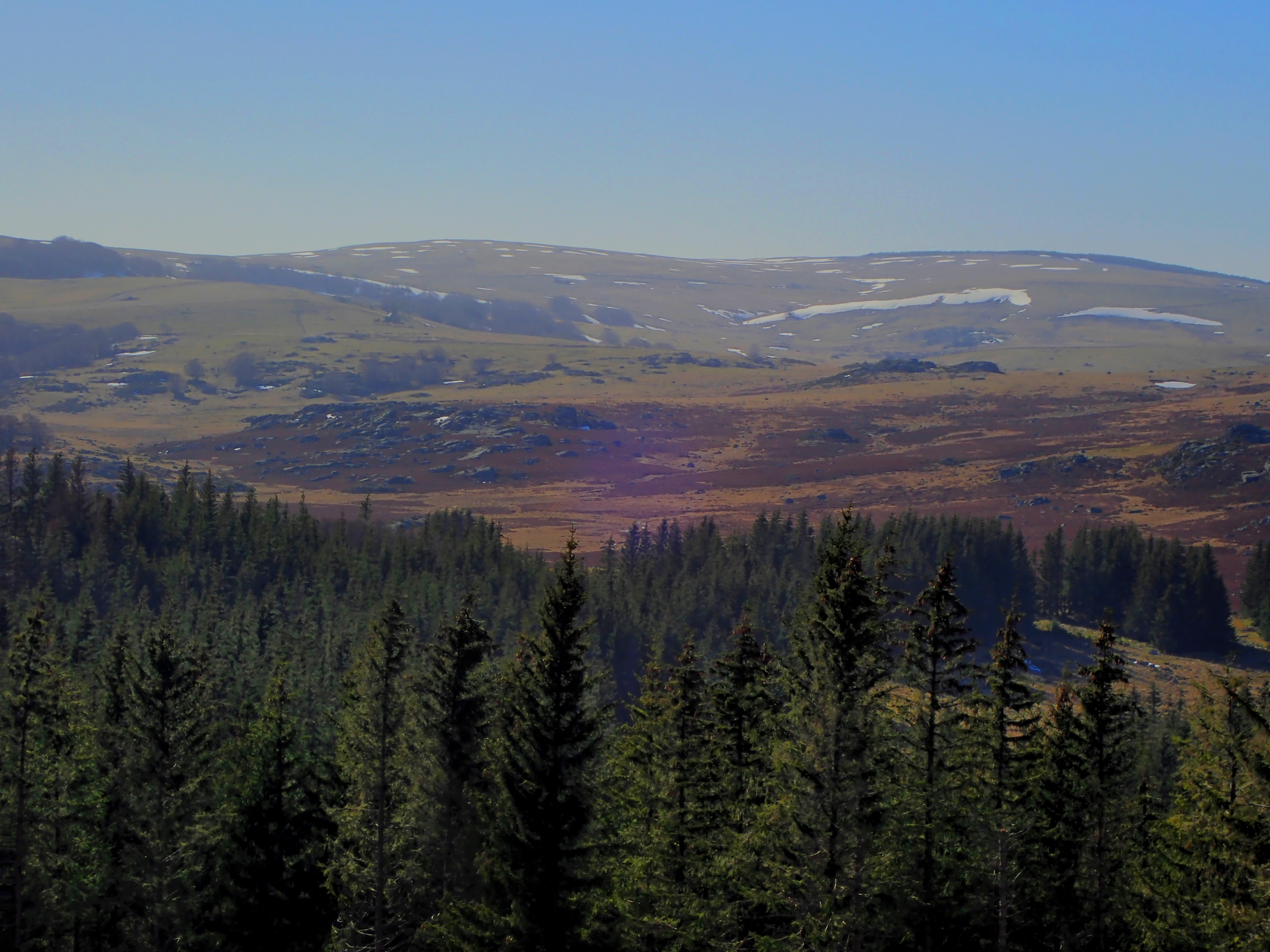
- The Signal de Mailhebiau viewed from the east.

Highest point
- Elevation: 1,469 m (4,820 ft)
- Coordinates: 44°34′01″N 3°04′56″E

Geography
- Location within France
- Location: Aveyron, Lozère, France
- Parent range: Aubrac (Massif Central)

The Signal de Mailhebiau (French pronunciation: [siɲal də majbjo]; or Mailhe-Biau; Occitan: Senhal de Mailhebiau) is the highest point of the Aubrac, at an altitude of 1,469 meters.

== Geography ==
=== Situation ===
It is shared between the departments of Aveyron and Lozère, with the summit itself located in the latter, in the commune of Trélans.

A viewpoint indicator is located at the summit, on which is inscribed a poem celebrating the beauties and the terroir of Aubrac.

=== Geology ===
Part of the mountain consists of a heavily eroded volcano that features pyroclastic tuffs containing spindle-shaped volcanic bombs. The Mailhebiau is one of the few well-identified volcanoes in the Aubrac; the others, located further north, are difficult to locate under the mass of basalt.
