= Montagnes Noires =

Coordinates: 48°09′N 3°40′W

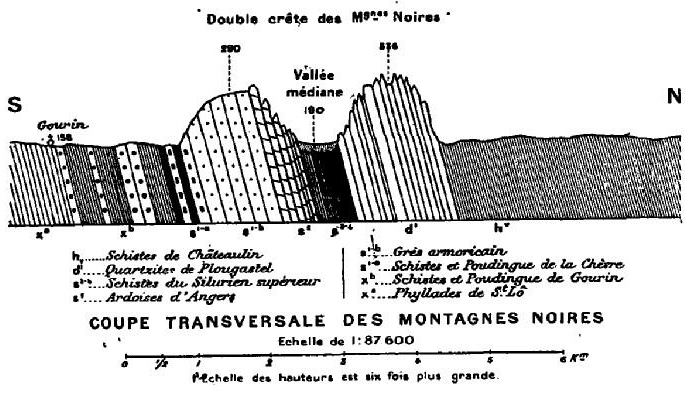
A section through the Montagnes Noires

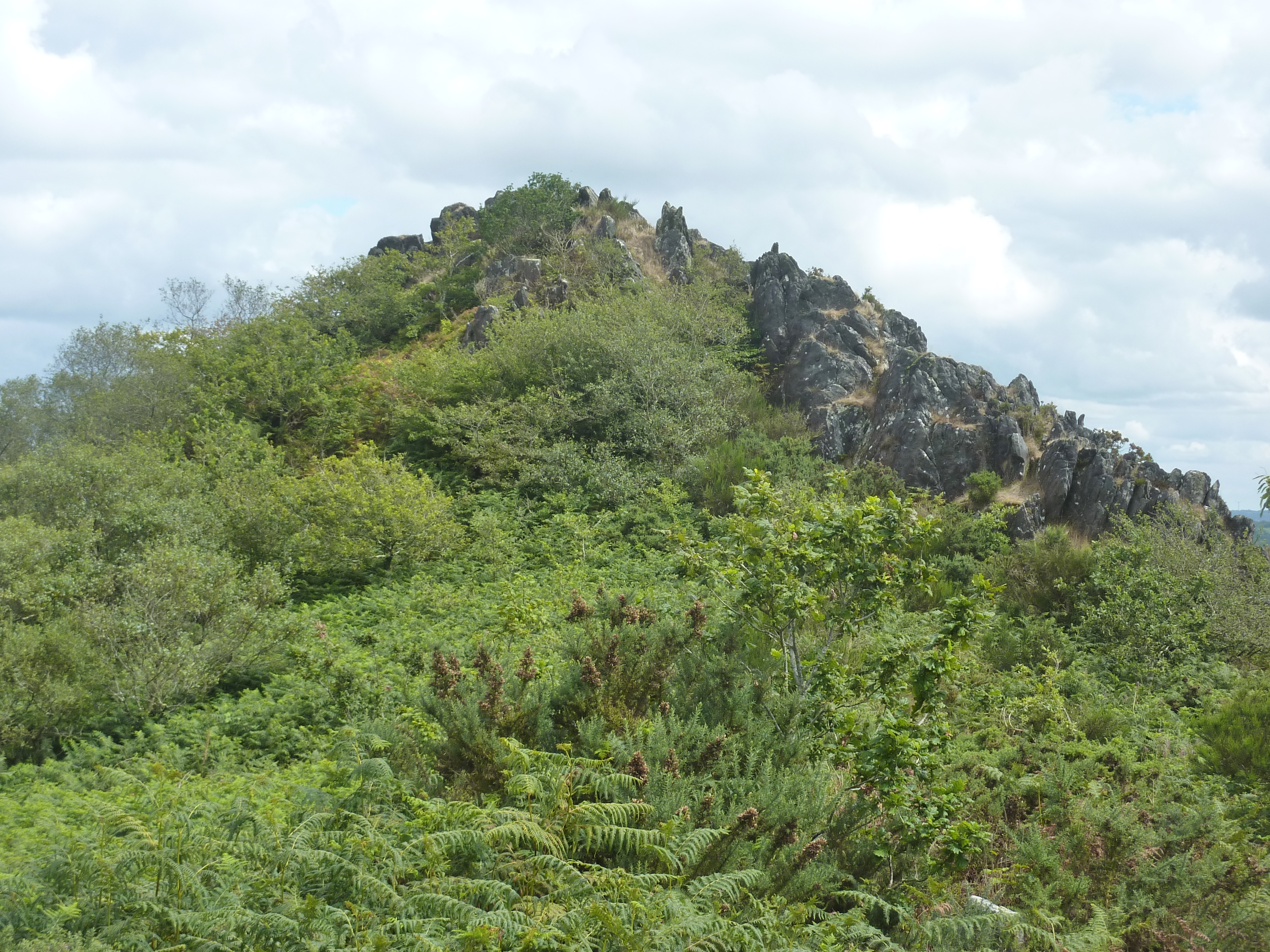
La Roche du Feu

The Montagnes Noires (French pronunciation: [mɔ̃taɲ nwaʁ], 'black mountains'; Breton: Menezioù Du), also known as the Montagne Noire (French, 'black mountain') and in Breton as Menez Du are an east–west oriented range of hills in Brittany centred on the town of Gourin. They culminate in the peak of Roc de Toullaeron (Breton: Roc'h Toull-al-Laeron) which attains a height of either 318m or 326m. Other significant peaks include Ar Menez (304m) and Montagne Noire (307m) (or, in Breton: Menez Du). They are composed from a range of Precambrian, Ordovician, Silurian and Devonian rocks forming a part of the Variscan orogen and include sandstones, quartzites and slates.

The hills form a part of the border between the départements of Finistère and Morbihan and just extend into Côtes-du-Nord.
