= Leucate =

Commune in Occitanie, France

- Commune
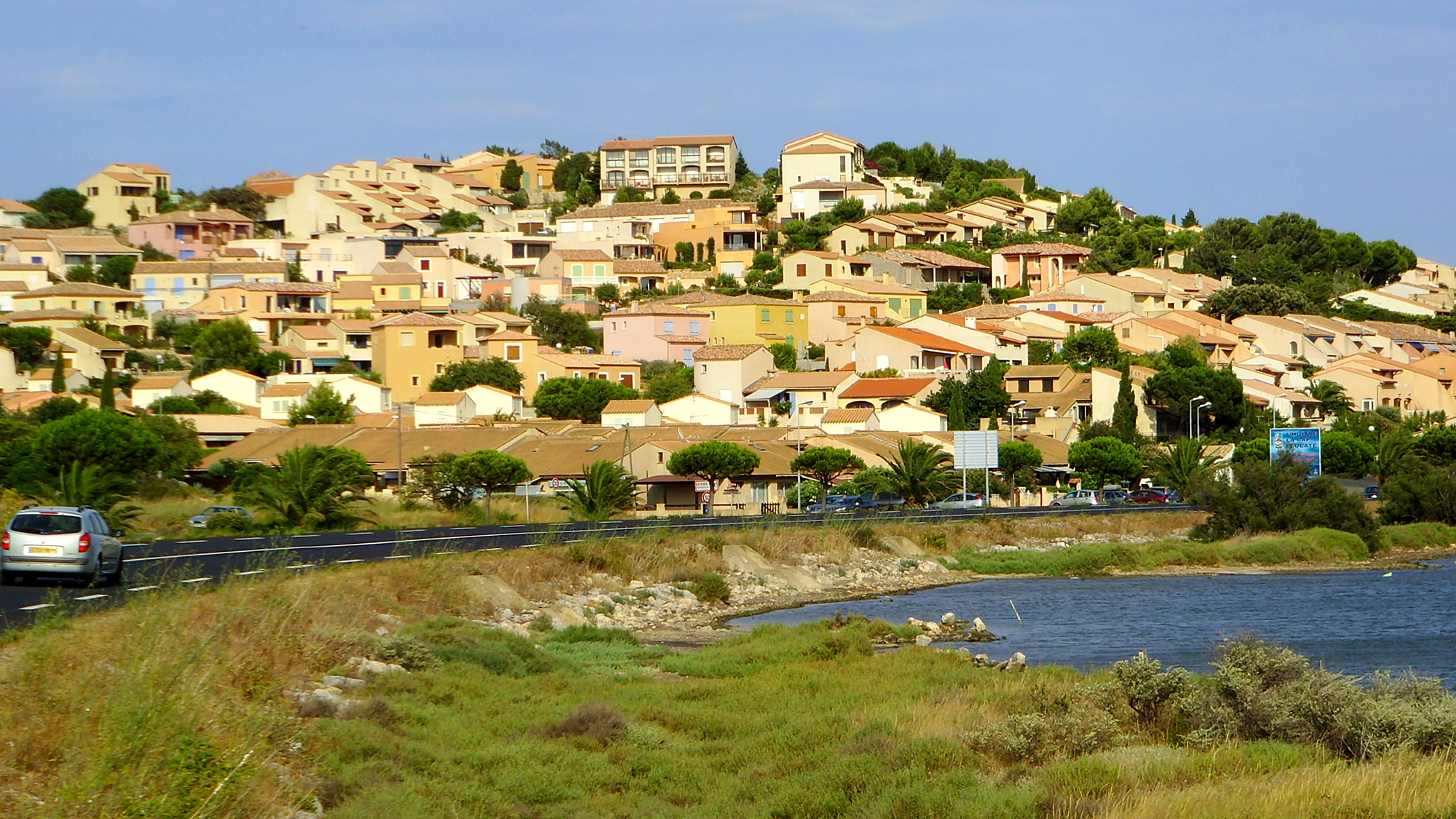
- A general view of Leucate

- Coat of arms
- Location of Leucate
- Location within France Location within Occitanie
- Coordinates: 42°54′38″N 3°01′46″E
- Country: France
- Region: Occitania
- Department: Aude
- Arrondissement: Narbonne
- Canton: Les Corbières Méditerranée
- Intercommunality: Grand Narbonne

Government
  - Mayor (2020–2026): Michel Py
- Area^{1}: 23.55 km^{2} (9.09 sq mi)
- Elevation: 25 m (82 ft)
- Highest elevation: 70 m (230 ft)
- Lowest elevation: 0 m (0 ft)
- Population (2023): 4,562
  - Density: 193.7/km^{2} (501.7/sq mi)
- Time zone: UTC+01:00 (CET)
  - Summer (DST): UTC+02:00 (CEST)
- INSEE/Postal code: 11202 /11370
- ^{1} French Land Register data, which excludes lakes, ponds, glaciers > 1 km^{2} (0.386 sq mi or 247 acres) and river estuaries.

Leucate (French pronunciation: [løkat]; Occitan: Leucata) is a commune in the Aude department in southern France. It lies between the Mediterranean Sea and the lagoon Étang de Leucate.

== Geography ==
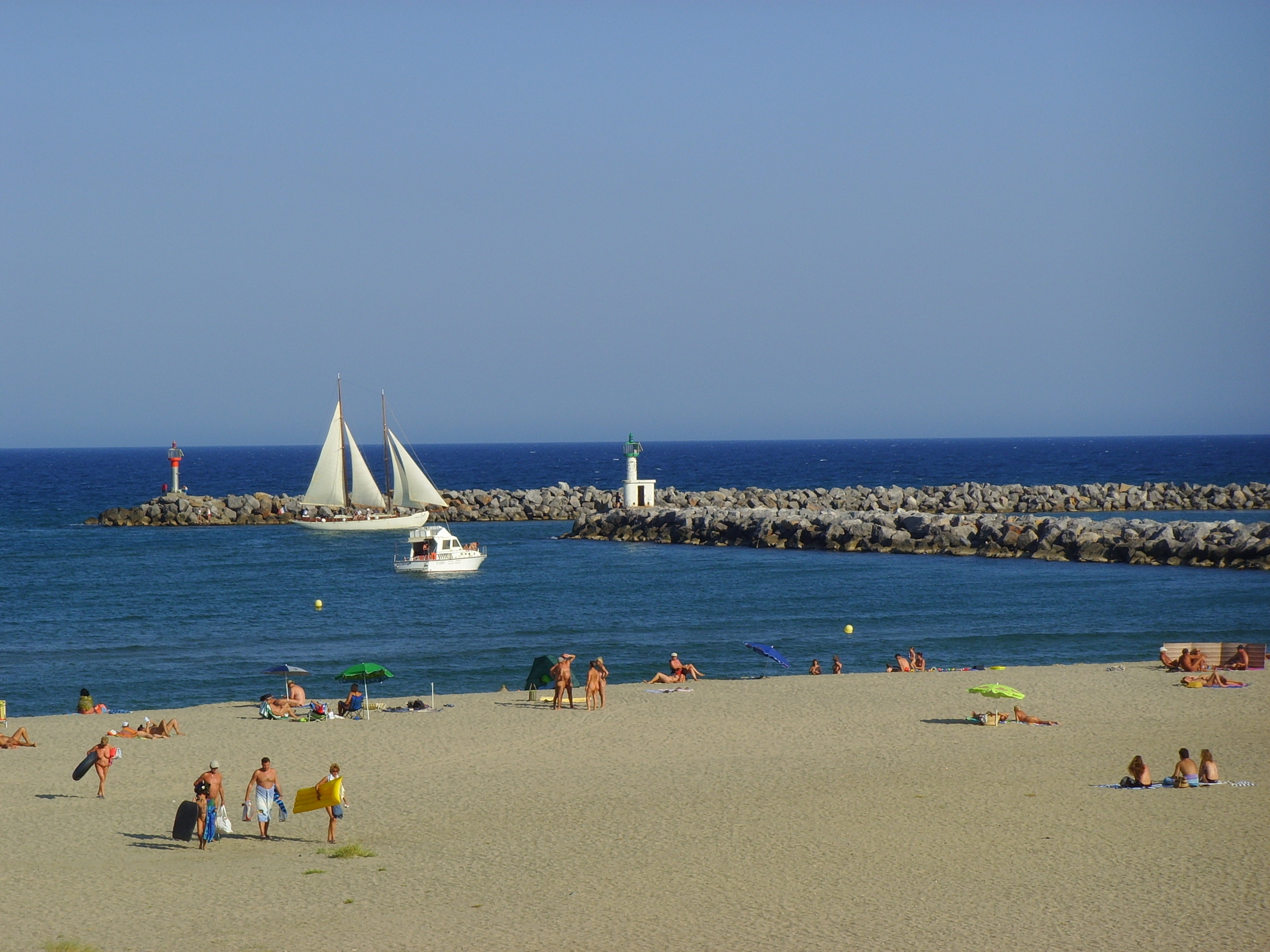
Beach Leucate naturist village

Leucate is on the Mediterranean coast of France. It is part of the eastern Corbières Massif, which are called the Corbières maritimes. It is around 30 km (19 mi) south of Narbonne, and around 30 km (19 mi) north of Perpignan.

On a clear day, the Phare du Cap Leucate offers a view over the French Mediterranean Sea from the Spanish border to the south to the Camargue to the east.

== Population ==
Historical population
Year	Pop.	±% p.a.
1968	1,233	—
1975	1,244	+0.13%
1982	1,968	+6.77%
1990	2,177	+1.27%
1999	2,732	+2.56%
2007	3,655	+3.71%
2012	4,148	+2.56%
2017	4,428	+1.32%
2023	4,562	+0.50%
Source: INSEE

== Urban morphology ==
The town stretches over five tourist attractions, from north to south:

- La Franqui
- Leucate village
- Leucate beach (Leucate plage)
- The naturist village (Village naturiste) on the island of Correggio
- Port-Leucate.

== Personalities ==
- Henry de Monfreid, adventurer and author
- Françoise de Cezelli (1558–1615) knight and French female war hero
- André Héléna (1919–1972) author
- Christophe Neff geographer

== See also ==
- Fitou AOC
- Corbières AOC
- Communes of the Aude department
- Siege of Leucate (1637)

== Sources ==
- Nöel Hautemanière and Jacques Hiron: Leucate : plein cadre; livre de photographies. Toreilles, 2004, ISBN 2-9516053-3-1.
- Christophe Neff: Kulturlandschaftswandel, Fremdenverkehr und Biodiversität auf der Halbinsel Leucate (Dept. Aude / Frankreich). In: Fremdenverkehrsgebiete des Mittelmeerraumes im Umbruch. Beiträge der Tagung des Arbeitskreises "Geographische Mittelmeerländer-Forschung“ vom 11.-13. Oktober 1996 in Regensburg. Regensburger Geographische Schriften, Heft 27, S. 99-135, Regensburg, 1998, ISBN 3-88246-193-4
- Christophe Neff : Observation géographiques et floristiques sur la presqu'île de Leucate. In: Bul. Soc. Et. Sc. Nat. Nîmes et Gard, T. 62, 1999, 23-34. DOI: 10.5445/IR/1000121552, download by KITopen
- Christophe Neff and Peter Frankenberg : Reflexions géobotaniques sur les plantes échappees de jardins: L´example de Euphorbia dendroides et d´autres espèces ornementales dans la région de Leucate et dans les Corbières maritimes (Aude, France). In : Bul. Soc. Et. Sc. Nat. Nîmes et Gard, T. 63, 2001, 7- 10.
- Christophe Neff : Les Corbières maritimes – forment-elles un étage de végétation méditerranéenne thermophile masqué par la pression humaine ? In: Eric Fouache (Edit.): The Mediterranean World Environment and History. IAG Working Group on Geo-archeology, Symposium Proceedings. Environmental Dynamics and History in Mediterranean Areas, Paris, Université de Paris – Sorbonne 24 – 26 avril 2002. Paris, 2003, 191 – 202, (Elsevier France, ISBN 2-84299-452-3).
