= Quercorbès =

French region

Coordinates: 42.98°N 2.00°E

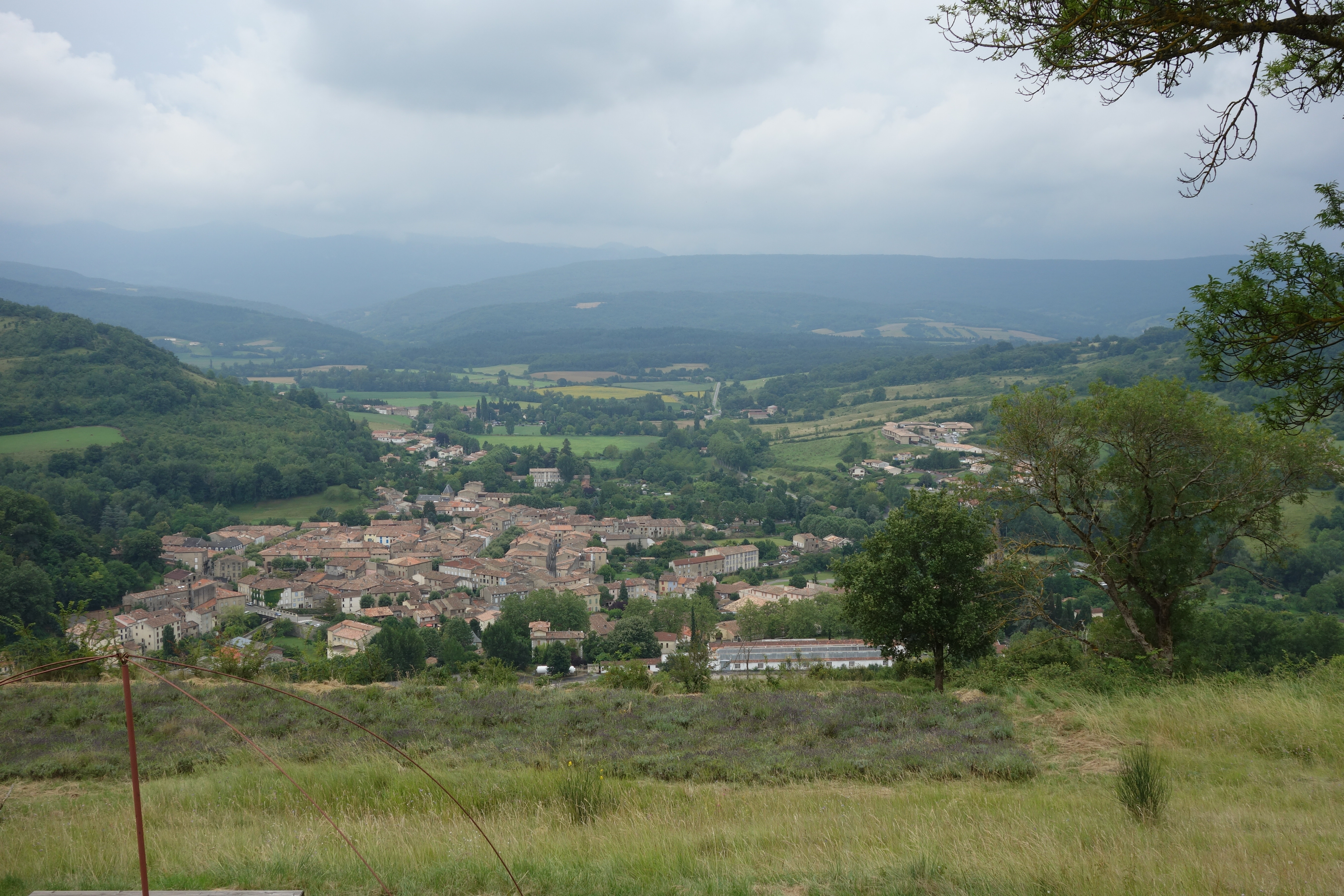
View of Chalabre from the Chapel.

Quercorbès or Quercorb, also Kercorbès, Kercorb, Chercorbès, Chercorb (Occitan: Quercorbés or Quercòrb), is a small natural region of France in the department of Aude, around the former castle of Quercorb. Historically, it stood between the county of Foix and Carcassonne. It is a region of small isolated mountains arising from the plain of Chalabre and the plateau of Puivert.
