= Aude =

Department of France in Occitanie

- Department
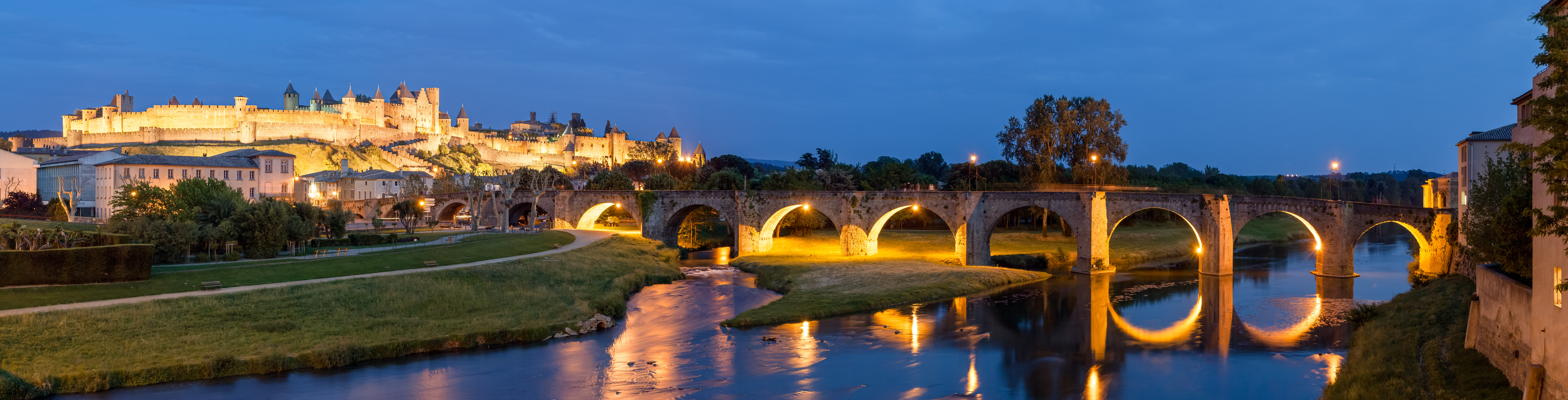
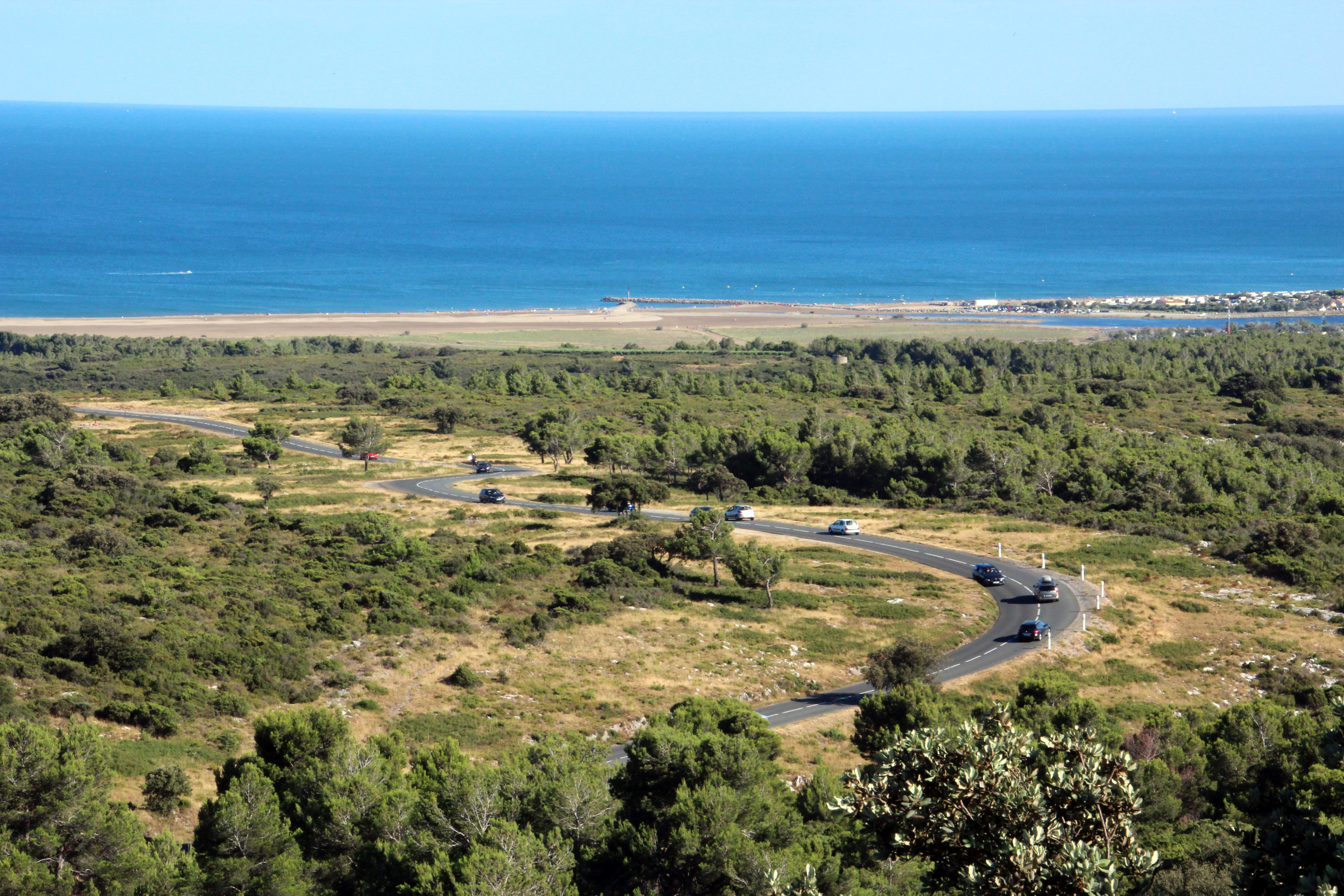
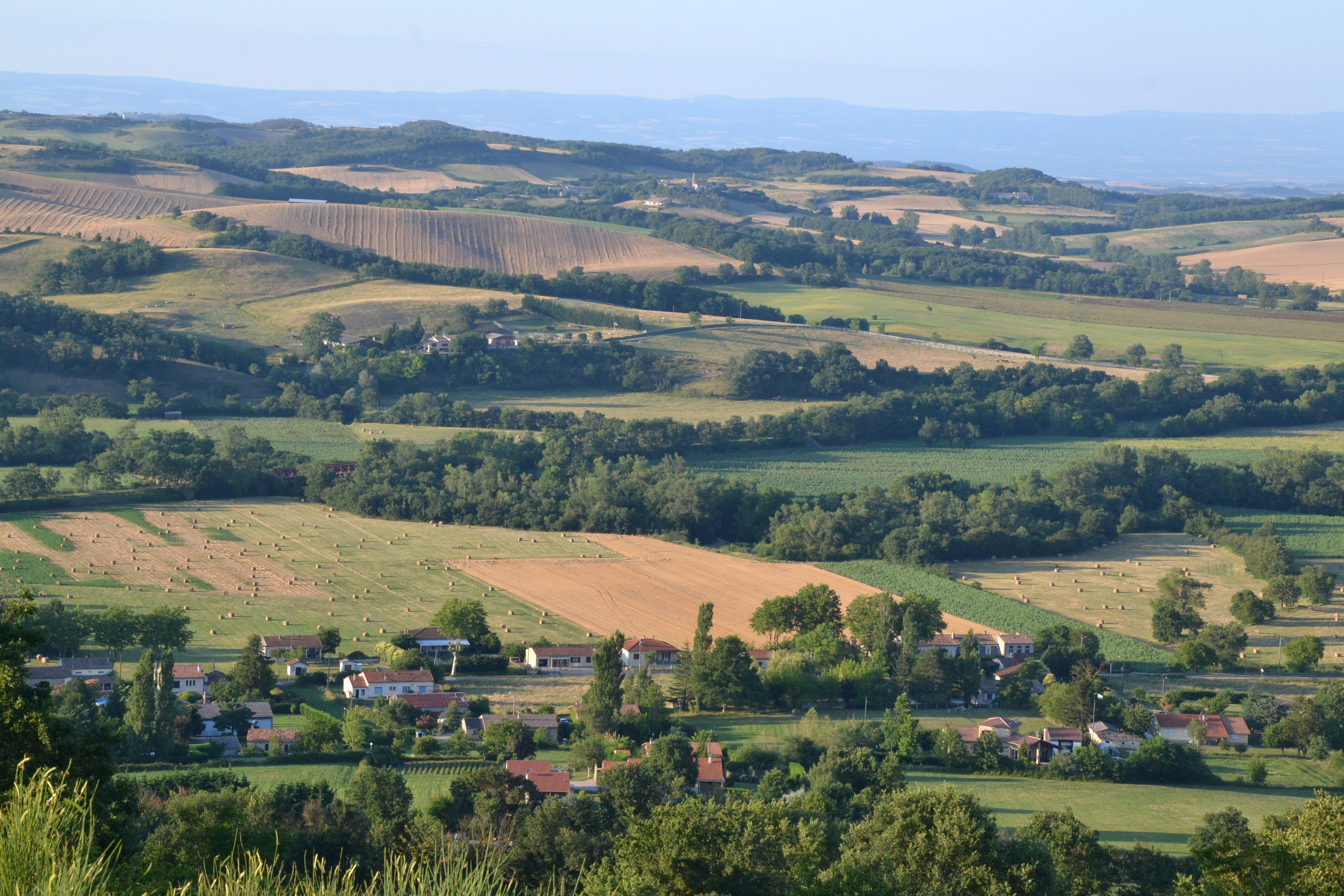
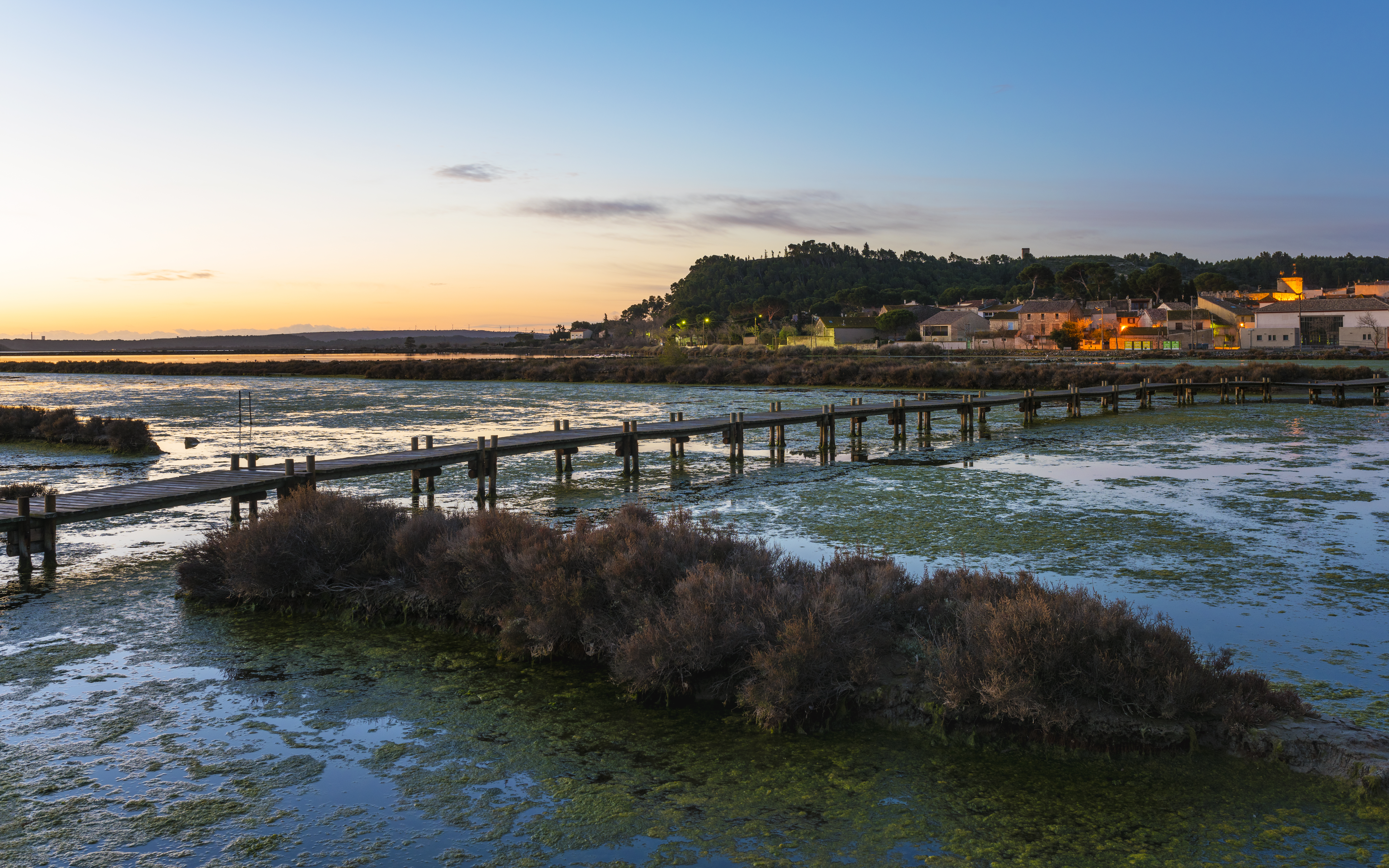
- From top down, left to right: Carcassonne, prefecture traversed by the Aude River, Mediterranean coast near Narbonne, Caudeval and Peyriac-de-Mer

- Flag Coat of arms

- Location of Aude in France
- Coordinates: 43°5′N 2°25′E
- Country: France
- Region: Occitanie
- Prefecture: Carcassonne
- Subprefectures: Limoux; Narbonne

Government
  - President of the Departmental Council: Hélène Sandragné (PS)

Area^{1}
  - Total: 6,139 km^{2} (2,370 sq mi)

Population (2023)
  - Total: 379,648
  - Rank: 64th
  - Density: 61.84/km^{2} (160.2/sq mi)
- Time zone: UTC+1 (CET)
  - Summer (DST): UTC+2 (CEST)
- ISO 3166 code: FR-11
- Department number: 11
- Largest city: Narbonne
- Arrondissements: 3
- Cantons: 19
- Communes: 433
- ^1 French Land Register data, which exclude estuaries, and lakes, ponds, and glaciers larger than 1 km^{2}

Aude (/oʊd/ OHD; French: [od]; Occitan: [ˈawðe]) is a department in southern France, located in Occitania and named after the river Aude. The departmental council also calls it "Cathar Country" (French: Pays cathare) after a group of religious dissidents active in the 12th to 14th centuries.

Its prefecture is Carcassonne and its subprefectures are Limoux and Narbonne. As of 2023, it had a population of 379,648. Aude is a frequent feminine French given name in Francophone countries, deriving initially from Aude or Oda, a wife of Bertrand, Duke of Aquitaine, and mother of Eudo, brother of Saint Hubertus. Aude was the name of Roland's fiancée in the chansons de geste.

== Geography ==
=== Location ===
Aude is located between the Mediterranean Sea and the Pyrenees Mountains.

It is part of the current region of Occitanie. It is surrounded by the departments of Pyrénées-Orientales, Ariège, Haute-Garonne, Tarn, and Hérault, with the Golfe du Lion on the east.

=== Natural regions ===
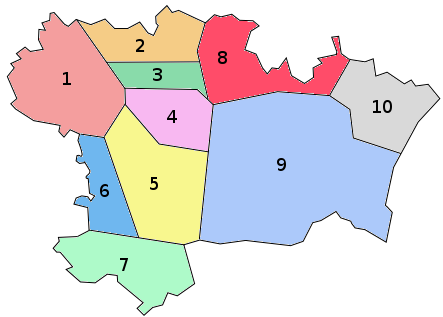
Natural regions of the Aude

The countryside in this department falls into several natural regions:

- 1 – Lauragais
- 2 – Montagne Noire
- 3 – Cabardès
- 4 – Carcassonnais
- 5 – Razès
- 6 – Quercorb
- 7 – Pays de Sault
- 8 – Minervois
- 9 – Corbières
- 10 – Narbonnais

=== Landscapes ===
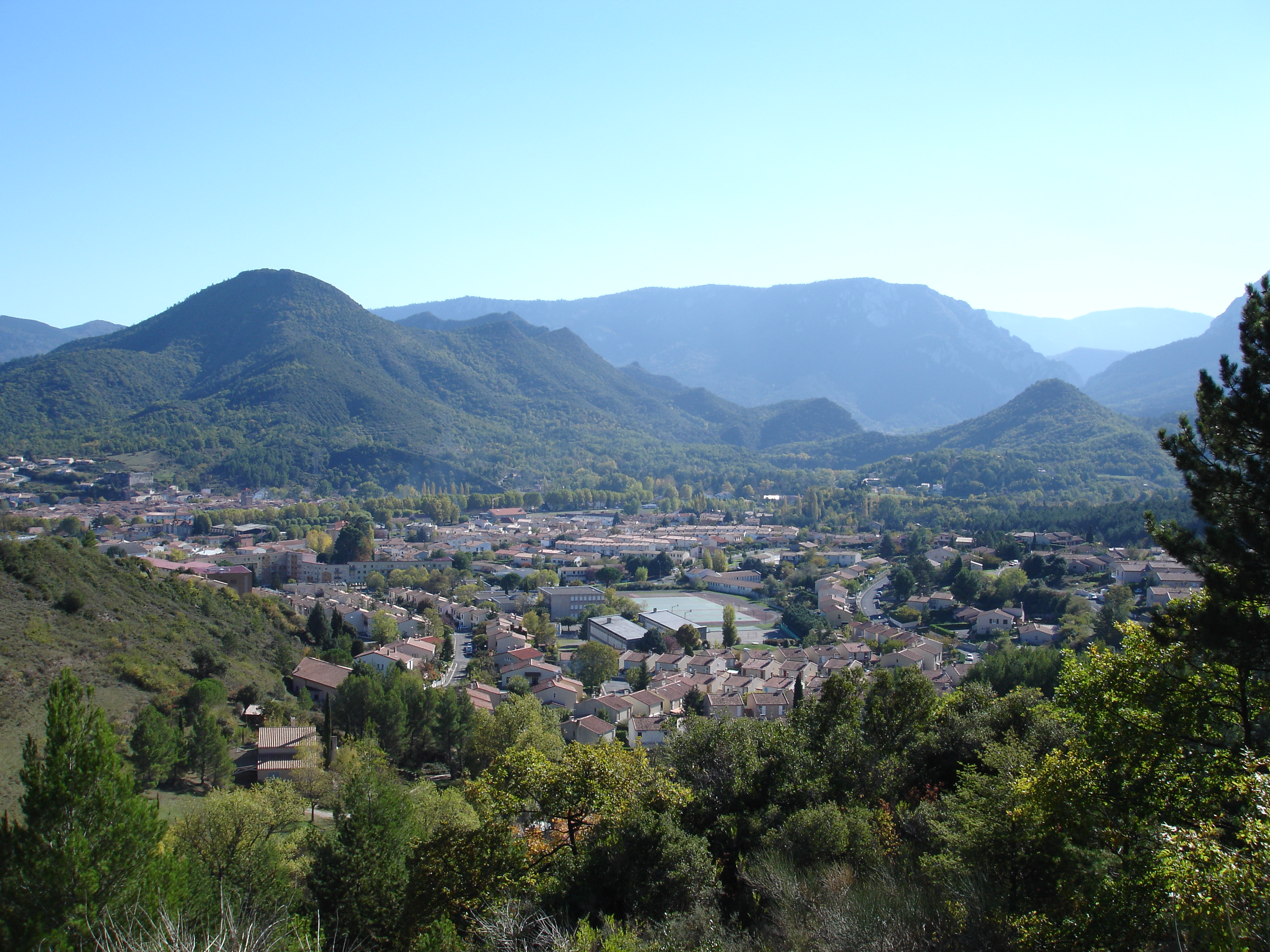
Mountain landscape in the Razès at Quillan

Each natural region of the Aude has its own particular landscape. In the east, lagoons or coastal lakes separate land and sea. These were formed by accumulations of sediments carried down by the rivers Aude, Orb and Hérault. There are many such lakes of brackish water. This environment is demanding for flora and fauna, as it suffers from the rigours of sea, sun, dryness and floods. Halophile (i.e., salt-loving) plants grow there. The area is also noted for the pink flamingo and the white stilt.

Inland to the west, shrub and scrub dominate the landscape of the drylands of the Aude and the Corbières Massif. This landscape is the result of forest clearance, maintained by the raising of livestock. The flora is varied and characterized by many species of orchids. The Sault countryside is dominated by beech groves and fir plantations up to the mountains. These forests are known for their mushrooms, and have a rich flora and fauna, including the Pyrenean lily, the euproctis moth and horsetail of the woods.

To the north and west, the Black Mountain country is made up of forests of oak and beech. The Lauragais is a wooded landscape where grain farming has shaped the hills. There are bodies of water like the Lac de la Ganguise. Finally, the high valley of the Aude, otherwise called the Razès, consists of a riparian forest made of beech, alder, poplar or ash. It includes some peatlands that are very rare in southern France.

=== Geology ===
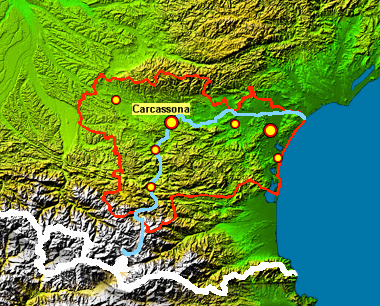
Relief map with some main towns

The landscapes of Aude can be explained by its geology. In the south, there are sedimentary rocks folded during the formation of the Pyrenees. To the north and centre of Aude, the sedimentary rocks are less folded. At the extreme east, near the Mediterranean, the rocks are carved by normal collapse faults which are due to the opening of the Golfe du Lion. The limestone Massif de la Clape runs along the entire coast from Gruissan to Saint-Pierre-la-Mer, and has to be crossed to go from Narbonne to Narbonne-Plage.

In the north, the Black Mountain and Minervois consist of schist and marble, forming the southern edge of the Massif Central. These ancient rocks are over 300 million years old and were deformed by the formation of the Hercynian chain. The Montagne d'Alaric (Alaric's Mountain) near Carcassonne is an antiform fold in the shape of a vault and made of limestone.

=== Climate ===
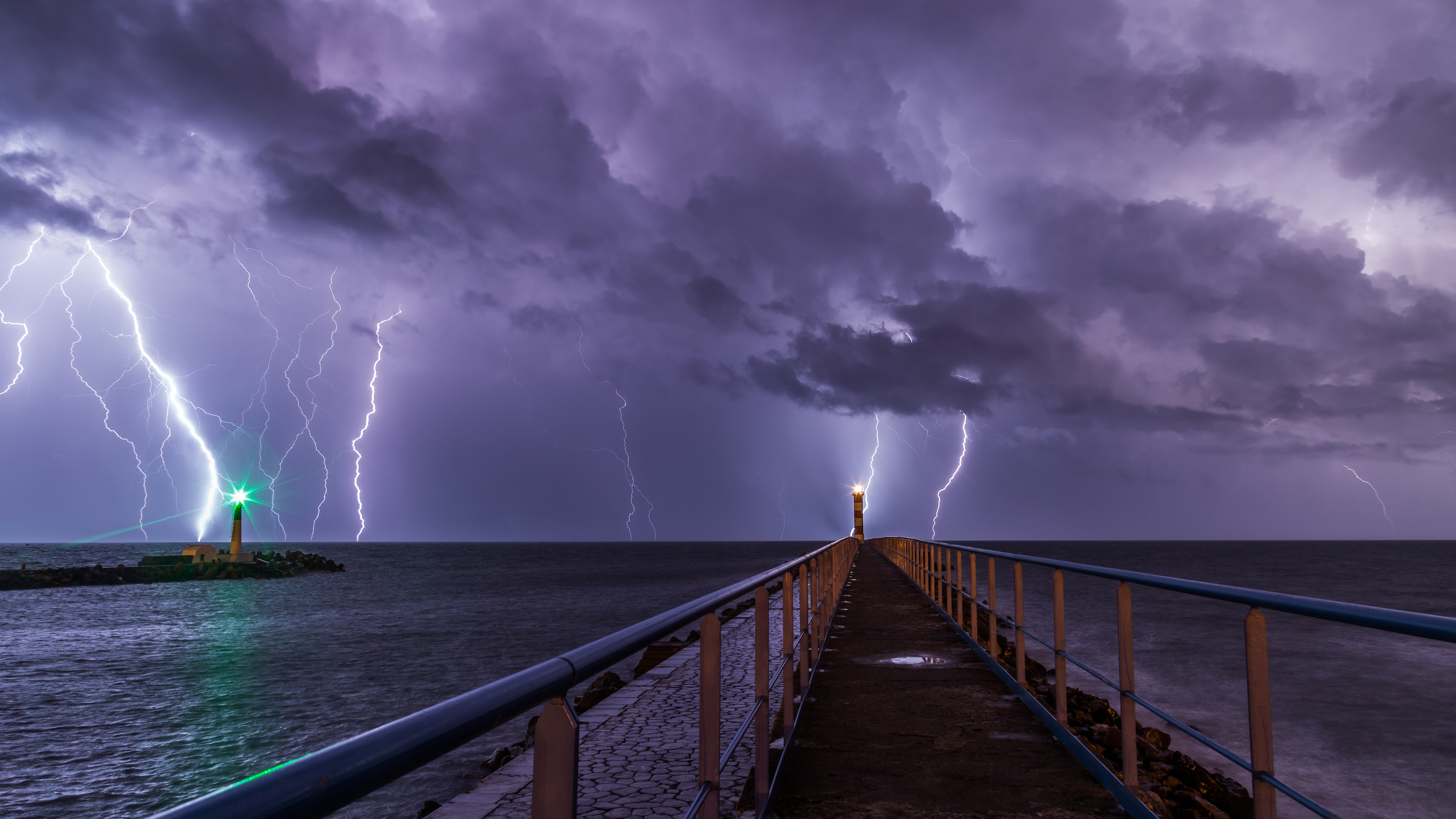
Lightning during an autumn storm off the coast of Port-la-Nouvelle.

Aude is under the influence of a Mediterranean climate.

The autumn is characterized by violent and short storms. The summer is often hot and dry, which is favorable to the culture of the vine and the olive-trees. Yet, the department has several contrasts in climate: In the north, the Montagne Noire and, in the south, the Pays de Sault, have a mountainous climate with temperatures sometimes very low in winter. In the west, the climate is under Aquitaine influence with heavier precipitation, while in the east the climate is purely Mediterranean. In the centre, in the Limouxin, Carcassonnais and Razès areas, the climate is known as intermediary with significant exposure to winds. The winds are often present in Aude. It is one of the windiest French departments, with 300 to 350 days of wind per year. This phenomenon is due mostly to the variations in relief north and south which create a kind of corridor.

In the north-west blows the Cers, called Tramontane in Provence, which is a ground wind. It is a dry, somewhat violent wind and cold in winter. In the south-east blows the Autan, locally called the Marin, which is hot and wet and comes from the sea.

These regular winds made it possible to install an industrial park of wind turbines, as in the area of Avignonet-Lauragais.

Comparison of local Meteorological data with other cities in France
Town	Sunshine (hours/yr)	Rain (mm/yr)	Snow (days/yr)	Storm (days/yr)	Fog (days/yr)
National average	1,973	770	14	22	40
Carcassonne	2,130	584	7	19	14
Paris	1,661	637	12	18	10
Nice	2,724	767	1	29	1
Strasbourg	1,693	665	29	29	56
Brest	1,605	1,211	7	12	75

Climate data for Carcassonne
Month	Jan	Feb	Mar	Apr	May	Jun	Jul	Aug	Sep	Oct	Nov	Dec	Year
Mean daily maximum °C (°F)	9.7 (49.5)	11.1 (52.0)	14.4 (57.9)	17.0 (62.6)	21.0 (69.8)	25.4 (77.7)	28.6 (83.5)	28.3 (82.9)	24.5 (76.1)	19.3 (66.7)	13.5 (56.3)	10.3 (50.5)	18.6 (65.5)
Daily mean °C (°F)	6.4 (43.5)	7.4 (45.3)	10.0 (50.0)	12.4 (54.3)	16.2 (61.2)	20.1 (68.2)	22.9 (73.2)	22.7 (72.9)	19.3 (66.7)	15.3 (59.5)	10.1 (50.2)	7.1 (44.8)	14.2 (57.6)
Mean daily minimum °C (°F)	3.1 (37.6)	3.6 (38.5)	5.6 (42.1)	7.7 (45.9)	11.4 (52.5)	14.8 (58.6)	17.2 (63.0)	17.0 (62.6)	14.0 (57.2)	11.2 (52.2)	6.6 (43.9)	3.8 (38.8)	9.7 (49.5)
Average precipitation mm (inches)	62.0 (2.44)	47.6 (1.87)	47.2 (1.86)	66.3 (2.61)	55.1 (2.17)	40.2 (1.58)	22.7 (0.89)	37.0 (1.46)	38.8 (1.53)	54.3 (2.14)	52.5 (2.07)	59.8 (2.35)	583.5 (22.97)
Average precipitation days (≥ 1 mm)	9.1	7.2	7.5	9.5	7.4	4.9	3.8	5.3	5.2	7.7	8.4	8.6	84.6
Mean monthly sunshine hours	94.7	116.5	168.9	186.6	209.8	253.1	276.5	260.8	218.6	147.4	103.1	93.5	2,129.5
Source: Meteorological data for Carcassonne - 126m altitude, from 1981 to 2010 January 2015 (in French)

=== Hydrography ===
The drainage system of Aude is dominated by its river of the same name. The river rises at the Roc d'Aude and passes through the Matemale and Puyvalador dams on the Capcir plateau at 1500m, then crosses the department from south to north across Axat, Limoux, and Quillan following the upper valley of the Aude. At Carcassonne, the river changes direction toward the Mediterranean Sea to the east, where it empties near Fleury.

== Principal towns ==
The most populous commune is Narbonne; the prefecture Carcassonne is the second-most populous. As of 2023, there are 5 communes with more than 10,000 inhabitants:

Commune	Population (2023)
Narbonne	57,587
Carcassonne	46,080
Castelnaudary	12,151
Limoux	10,532
Lézignan-Corbières	10,343

== History ==
=== Prehistory ===
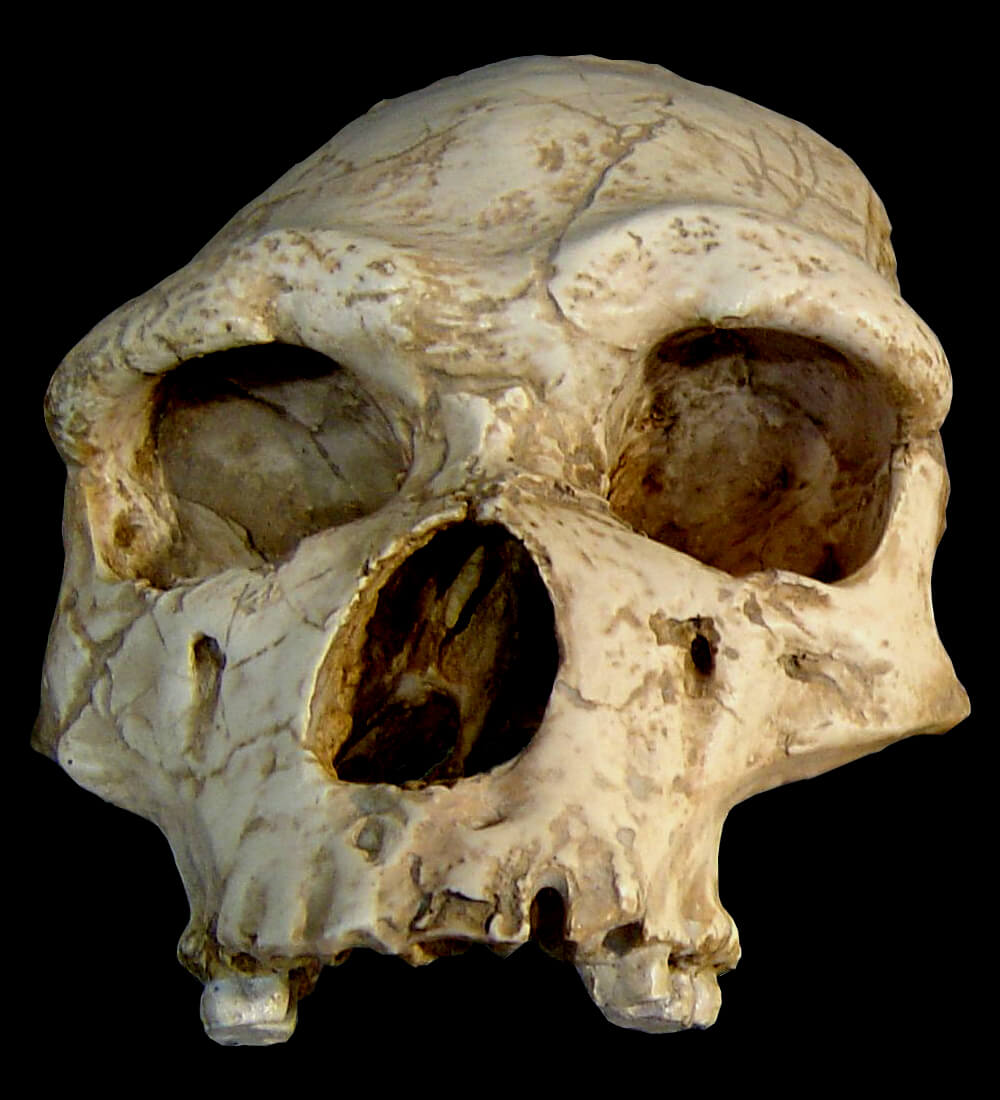
Skull of Tautavel Man discovered at Tautavel, not far from Aude

Hammers and worked tools have been found on the hill of Grazailles at Carcassonne, dating from between 690,000 and 300,000 years ago. Most interesting is the skull of Tautavel Man, discovered in 1971 by Henry de Lumley in the commune of Tautavel in the Pyrénées-Orientales department. It is the oldest-known skull in Europe. It dates from about 450,000 years BC. It is likely that Tautavel Man lived in all of this region.

=== Roman Era ===
The Romans, led by the consul-general Domitius Ahenobarbus, first occupied the oppidum of Montlaurès in 118 BC, a few kilometres to the north of Narbonne. This became the provincial capital and a very active mercantile port. The position was strategically important since it stood at the crossroads of two Roman roads, the Via Aquitania and the Via Domitia, as well as by the sea near the mouth of the river Aude. Carcassonne became Latin in 30 BC with the creation of numerous grain farms. For almost two centuries, Aude enjoyed peace and strong economic growth.

=== Barbarian invasions ===
The Visigoths invaded the area in 435 AD at a time when Flavius Aetius, the Roman senator, was busy suppressing the Bagaudes, who were brigands or lawless types in central and northern Gaul. Roman authority was restored until 462. In 507, the victory of Clovis I at the battle of Vouillé permitted him to conquer Toulouse and Aquitaine. However, he could not recover the Aude territory, which, thanks to the help of the King of the Ostrogoths, remained in the hands of the Visigoths. His troops defeated Clovis's son in 508. The region was part of Septimania, so called because it was composed of seven bishoprics that the Visigoth kings had established there: Elne, Agde, Narbonne, Lodève, Béziers, Maguelonne, and Nîmes. Septimania covered the Aude but also the whole region of Languedoc-Roussillon.

=== Middle Ages ===
In 817, Louis le Débonnaire detached Carcassès and Razès from Septimania to reunite them with the marquisate of Toulouse and the kingdom of Aquitaine. The first Count of Carcassonne was Oliba from the family of the Counts of Barcelona. He established himself in 819. Razès was another county that was formed by an archbishop of Narbonne who had been chased from his town by the Saracens. He had transferred his episcopal seat to Razès and had procured the honours of the feudal title for the area. Narbonne formed a third county. Thus, in the ninth century, the département of Aude consisted of three counties: Carcassonne, Razès and Narbonne. In 880, the County of Razès was united by marriage to that of Carcassonne, never to be separated.

=== Catharism in Aude ===
In the 13th century, the region saw the development of Catharism: a dualistic Christian sect with similarities to Gnosticism. This religion was very quickly judged as heretical by the Catholic Church. Faced with its growing strength in the counties of Carcassonne and Toulouse, Pope Innocent III in 1209 declared a crusade against the Albigensians. The barons of the north united to form an army under the command of Simon de Montfort. Whereas the count of Toulouse Raymond VI received absolution, the Count of Carcassonne confronted the army alone. The city of Carcassonne became the refuge of numerous Cathars.

=== The Protestant crisis and economic expansion of the department ===
In 1561, religious troubles again arose at Carcassonne in the form of a Protestant crisis. Duke Henri I de Montmorency, the Governor of the Languedoc, joined the Reformed side in 1574. On the Catholic side, the Duke Anne de Joyeuse became head of the Catholic League. In September 1632, Henri II de Montmorency fought against the royal troops at the Battle of Castelnaudary and was defeated. He was condemned to death and executed at Toulouse.

=== The creation of the department ===
Aude in 1790

The present department is one of the original 83 departments created by the Constituent Assembly during the French Revolution on 4 March 1790. It was created from part of the former province of Languedoc. Administrative divisions were amended by the Act of 28 Pluviôse of Year 8, which created four arrondissements (reduced to three by Premier Raymond Poincaré in 1926) and reduced the number of cantons from 45 to 31.

=== The 20th century ===
The Aude enjoyed strong wine production whilst at the same time the grain farmers of Lauragais faced great difficulties. However, the department suffered from overproduction and a slump in sales of wine. In 1907 the crisis produced a winemakers' revolt. This led to the establishment of many Winemaking cooperatives in Aude from 1909.

=== Heraldry ===
Arms of Aude	Blazon: Gules, a cross of Toulouse Or within a bordure embattled argent.

== Economy ==
=== Overview ===
Economically active population by economic sector, 2019
Agriculture	8,309 people
Industry	9,098 people
Construction	8,826 people
Tertiary sector	100,474 people

=== Agriculture and fisheries ===
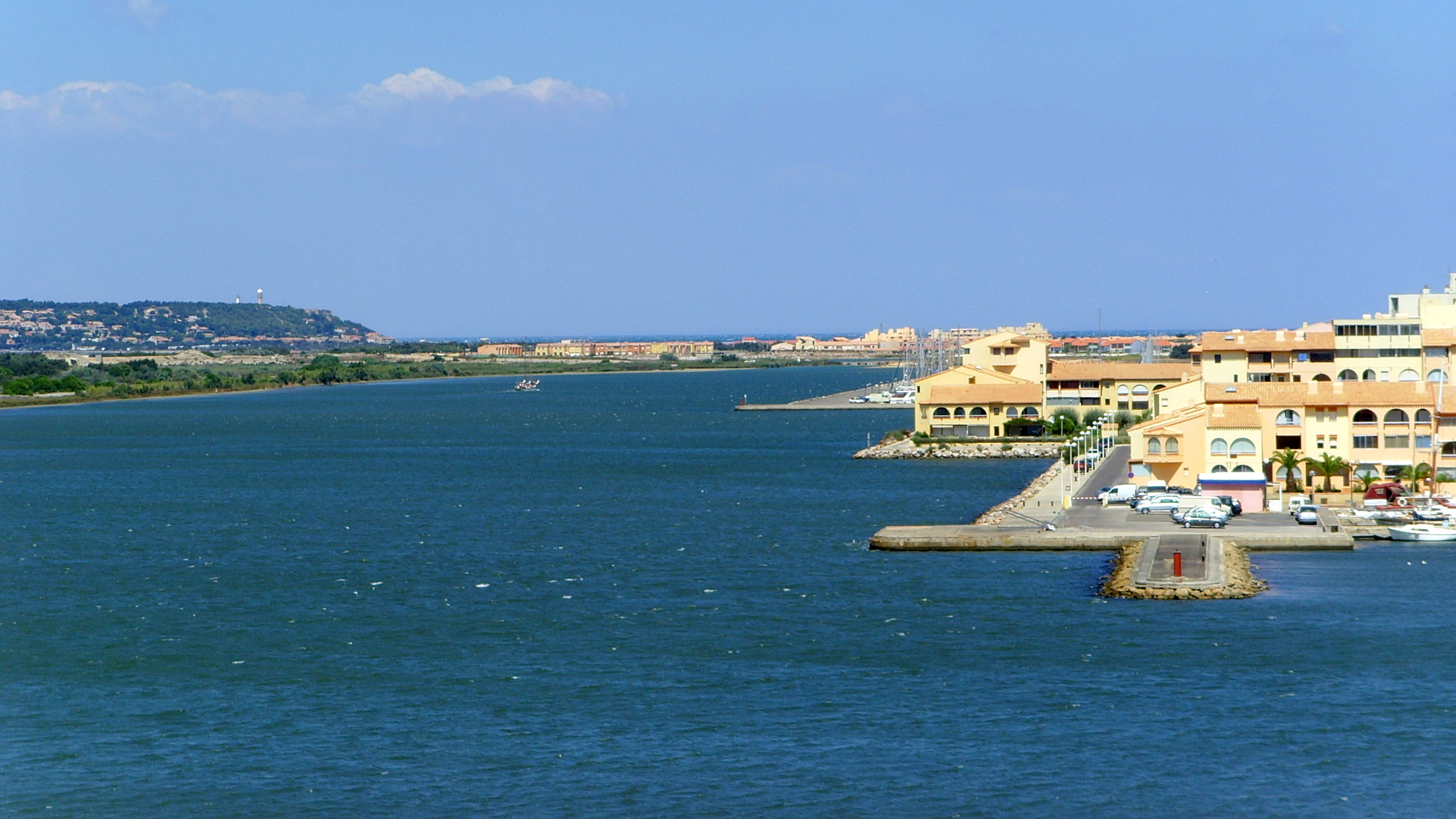
Entry to the port of Leucate

Aude is an agricultural area dominated by vineyards. In the east are the wines of Corbieres and La Clape, in the centre are Minervois and Côtes de Malepère, and in the south Limoux wine. In Lauragais grain is predominant, whereas in the Montagne Noire only sheep farming is possible. More recently there has been an increase in cultivation of olive trees for their oil.

Port-la-Nouvelle is the biggest fishing port in the department followed by Gruissan. In 1996 there were 127 vessels in Aude including 75 in Port-la-Nouvelle and 52 in Gruissan. These vessels were as follows:

- Fishing trawlers: 19 in Port-la-Nouvelle
- tuna boats: 2 in Port-la-Nouvelle
- small craft: 106 including 54 in Port-La-Nouvelle and 52 in Gruissan

Small craft are recreational boats such as dinghies with one man fishing a lake or motor launches with up to three people fishing in coastal waters. About 85% of small craft are intended for lake fishing as in the Étang de Thau.

=== Viticulture ===
Map of wine growing areas of the Aude

Viticulture is the main economic activity of the department due to its rich and varied soils. It was the Greeks who established vineyards in Aude and the Romans who determined the rights of exploitation. The first vines were planted in Minervois in the 1st century.

But the grapes and wines were not consumer products or self-sufficient for many years. Cereals and olive trees dominated the fertile plains of Aude. It was at the beginning of the 19th century that the wine industry developed in Aude and the rest of Languedoc-Roussillon. Wine then became a consumer product. Higher output was needed and vineyards replaced cereals on the plains. There was an initial period of prosperity to 1850 before phylloxera appeared towards 1870. At the end of the 19th century, Aude experienced a second period of prosperity but there was a wine crisis triggered in 1901 because of over-production, fraud, and slumping sales. It reached its peak during the winemakers revolt in 1907. The wine growers regrouped themselves into winemaking cooperatives to prevent fraud and deception. In 1919 then in 1935, a law of AOC was adopted under the leadership of Jean Capus. The INAO was set up as a body to control the application of the new laws.

After the Second World War, the vineyards were revitalized and the region saw a mass of viticulture. The wine was produced in large quantities and satisfied a very demanding population. The product was supplied in large quantities at very low prices. In 1970 the market evolved replacing demand for quantity with demand for quality and causing a second wine crisis. Many events, negotiations, and attacks paralyzed the region and the economy. Emile Pouytès and the CRS Joel le Gof died at Montredon-des-Corbières on 4 March 1976 during this crisis. A large change in the Aude viticulture business started with a reorganization of the profession and the wine-growing region. Quality had to become the mark of wine from Aude.

The rich and varied soil of Aude together with abundant sunshine enables Aude to produce quality wines. Many wines emanate from the department, ranging in quality from table wines to AOCs, passing through vins de pays and VDQS.

There are seven main areas of production:

- Cabardès AOC (1),
- Corbières AOC (6),
- Côtes Malepère AOC near Carcassonne (2),
- Coteaux du Languedoc on the plain of Narbonnais (5),
- Fitou AOC (7),
- Limoux wine (3),
- Minervois AOC (4).

These areas produce different wines such as Blanquette de Limoux, Chardonnay and sparkling wine from Limoux, La Clape, Corbières, Fitou, and Cabardès.

=== Industry and energy ===
Industrial activity is strong in the upper valley of the Aude. It has been especially prominent around Limoux since the late nineteenth century; and the Lafarge brick plant there is still booming.

Since the 1970s, however, the Aude has seen a rapid decline in its traditional industries such as shoe and hat making. More recent activity is mostly centred around Narbonne, particularly dock facilities and oil depots in Port-la-Nouvelle.

From 1889, the high valley of Aude became increasingly important in generating hydroelectric power. Aude was the first department in France to transmit such power, from its plants at Alet-les-Bains and Quillan. Joachim Estrade established the first electricity company in France, the Southern Power Transmission Company (SMTF), in 1901. Its plant at Axat-Saint-Georges supplied the cities of Carcassonne and Narbonne at 20 kilovolts.

Today Aude is the leading department in France for the number of wind turbines installed. There are 113 in operation. They produce some 91 megawatts, which is the domestic electricity consumption of about 100,000 people. With the proliferation of these machines, the prefecture is seeking to establish with stakeholders a charter of good conduct for wind turbines.

=== Crafts ===
Crafts are very well represented in Aude with 14.6% of the population involved. Some 5,400 businesses operating in 250 craft professions achieved in the late 1990s an annual turnover of 3 billion francs (400 million Euros).

== Demography ==
The inhabitants of Aude are known as Audois. Its population increases, due to positive migration balance, offset by slightly negative natural growth.

Aude is predominantly rural with a population density of 62 inhabitants per km^{2}, which is about half of the national average. The two main cities, Carcassonne and Narbonne, are medium-sized cities comprising only one third of the inhabitants of the department.

Historical population

Year	Pop.	±% p.a.
1793	239,642	—
1800	225,228	−0.88%
1806	240,993	+1.13%
1821	253,194	+0.33%
1831	270,125	+0.65%
1836	281,080	+0.80%
1841	284,285	+0.23%
1846	289,661	+0.38%
1851	289,747	+0.01%
1856	282,833	−0.48%
1861	283,606	+0.05%
1866	288,626	+0.35%
1872	285,927	−0.16%
1876	300,065	+1.21%
1881	327,942	+1.79%
1886	332,080	+0.25%
1891	317,372	−0.90%
1896	310,513	−0.44%
1901	313,531	+0.19%

Year	Pop.	±% p.a.
1906	308,327	−0.33%
1911	300,537	−0.51%
1921	287,052	−0.46%
1926	291,951	+0.34%
1931	296,880	+0.34%
1936	285,115	−0.81%
1946	268,889	−0.58%
1954	268,254	−0.03%
1962	269,782	+0.07%
1968	278,323	+0.52%
1975	272,366	−0.31%
1982	280,686	+0.43%
1990	298,712	+0.78%
1999	309,962	+0.41%
2007	345,779	+1.38%
2012	362,339	+0.94%
2017	370,260	+0.43%
2023	379,648	+0.42%

Source: SPLAF and INSEE

== Transport ==
Two major roads cross the Aude. From west to east the A61 autoroute (Autoroute des Deux Mers) connects Narbonne and Toulouse via Carcassonne. From north to south, following the Mediterranean coast, the A9 autoroute links Montpellier with Spain.

The rail network follows the same route as the road network. It is a low speed system, but a project is under way to build a fast line to Spain as part of the Trans-European Rail network.

In terms of air travel, the department is served by Carcassonne Airport which provides direct routes some European destinations. The nearest major airport is Toulouse–Blagnac Airport which is mostly used by air travellers from the department.

Finally, Aude is crossed by the Canal du Midi which is a major waterway that allows tourists to pass from the Atlantic Ocean to the Mediterranean Sea. It comes into the west of Aude at Seuil de Naurouze then joins the Mediterranean at Sète.

== Politics ==
Map of arrondissements and cantons of Aude

The people of Aude expressed royalist opinions until the end of the Bourbon Restoration. In 1830 republican ideas began to develop and made this department a bastion of the left. This growth is symbolized by two men, Armand Barbès and Theophile Marcou. Armand Barbès is a symbol of the struggle for a social democratic Republic.

It was in Aude that François Mitterrand had his highest score in the 1981 presidential election with just over 63% of the vote.

Only affluent coastal areas surrounding Narbonne and the department's prefecture, Carcassonne give consideration to the right.

The President of the Departmental Council is Hélène Sandragné of the Socialist Party.

=== Current National Assembly Representatives ===
Constituency	Member	Party
Aude's 1st constituency	Christophe Barthès	National Rally
Aude's 2nd constituency	Frédéric Falcon	National Rally
Aude's 3rd constituency	Julien Rancoule	National Rally

Party		seats
•	Socialist Party	26
	Union for a Popular Movement	4
•	French Communist Party	2
•	Left Radical Party	1
•	Miscellaneous Left	1
	Independent Workers' Party	1

== Education ==
Aude department in 2008 had 364 primary schools (schools of the first degree) serving 30,771 students. Between 2000 and 2007, primary school enrollment steadily increased from 28,331 students to 30,491 students. At secondary level, the department had 31 colleges and 17 public and private high schools for about 23,000 students in 2006.

Education in Aude now includes teaching in the Occitan language.

== Culture ==
=== Festivals and traditions ===
The Carnival of Limoux is an Aude festival which takes place over a period of ten weeks or more. This is one of the longest carnivals in the world. It takes place in the town of Limoux on the Place de la République every weekend from mid-January to the end of March. It is characterized by bands in Pierrot costumes (known as les fécos) accompanied by musicians. In the region around Limoux a major celebration of gastronomy known as Toques et Clochers (literally, "Tall Hats & Steeples') organized by the winegrowers from Sieur d'Arques' takes place over the weekend of Palm Sunday. It permits the sale of a large quantity of wine in order to enhance local patronage.

=== Sport ===
Aude is the land of rugby league (rugby à XIII) with the teams of Limoux, Carcassonne and Lézignan among the elite. Puig Aubert (1925–1994) was a famous rugby league player who played with AS Carcassonne. There are numerous amateur rugby league clubs dotted all over the area.

Rugby union (rugby à XV) is also played in Aude. It appeared early in the twentieth century and the US-Quillan club dominated in the late 1920s. Jean Bourrel won the title in 1929 against Lézignan. After the Second World War, the Carcassonne team took the lead. Recently, however, rugby union in the Aude has faced an uphill struggle in a sport that has become both globalized and more professional. The Narbonne team (known as Racing Club Narbonne-Mediterranean) has nevertheless managed to develop in the Pro D2 championship.

Every 15 August, in Quillan, an international cycling competition takes place. This is the oldest of such contests in France.

The Tour de l'Aude is one of the most important female cycling events in the calendar. It generally takes place in May.

=== Gastronomy ===
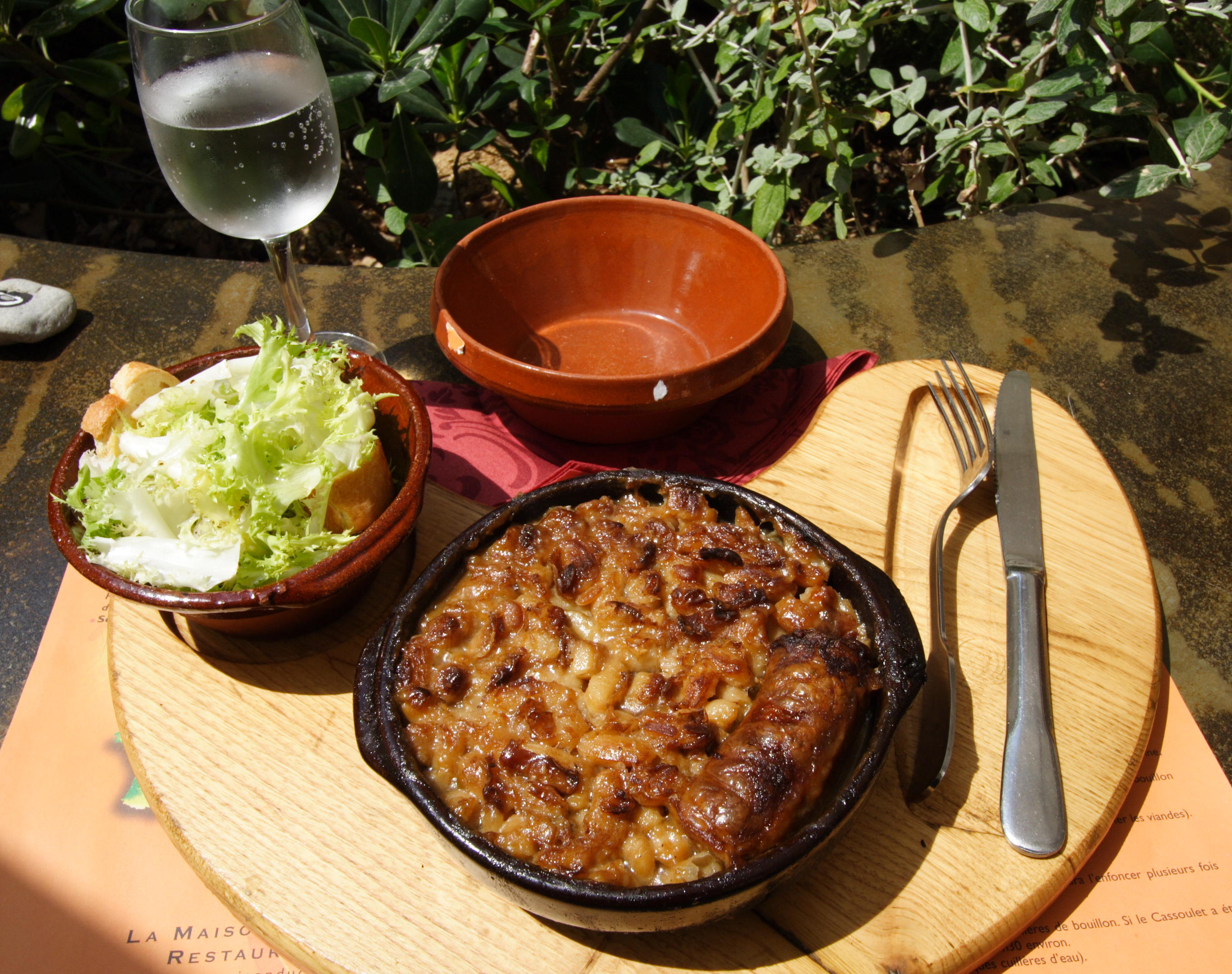
Cassoulet as served at Carcassonne

Fréginat, a traditional type of fricassee of pork from Corbières, can be found throughout the department. It is made from pork and pig's liver with a local variety of white beans (Lingots de Castelnaudary) flavoured with garigue herbs. On the coast, eel stew (borrida d’anguilles) is a dish of choice. Finally, the cassoulet of Castelnaudary, made from white beans and sausage, is a typical dish of the Lauragais.

Other specialties exist such as oysters from Gruissan and Leucate. Olive oil is also very widespread in the Aude and is a speciality of Bize-Minervois. Cartagena is a liqueur marketed by some manufacturers. Finally, the Blanquette de Limoux is a sparkling white wine popular in the department whose origin dates back to the sixteenth century.

=== Occitan ===
Occitan is spoken in the Aude in its Languedoc variant. The language emerged during the High Middle Ages from the Latin used in the south of Gaul.

In Aude, Occitan was rarely used in writing before the 11th century. However, several poets and troubadours such as Raimon de Miraval used language based on courtly love in the 12th and 13th centuries. In the 14th and 15th centuries, Occitan was used to draw up local administrative documents. In the 16th century, Occitan was used less than royal French, whose use was made compulsory by the edict of Villers-Cotterêts in 1539. However, it survived very well among the people until the 19th century, when public schools were established with teaching solely in French.

In the 1970s and the 1980s, new demands were made for the dignity of the language and for its teaching. Occitan speech reached a wider audience and singers like Claudi Marti, Mans de Brèish, and La Sauze promoted its use.

It was in Aude that the first Occitan radio station broadcast in the region of Languedoc-Roussillon: Ràdio Lenga (Occitan) at 95.5 FM.

== Tourism ==
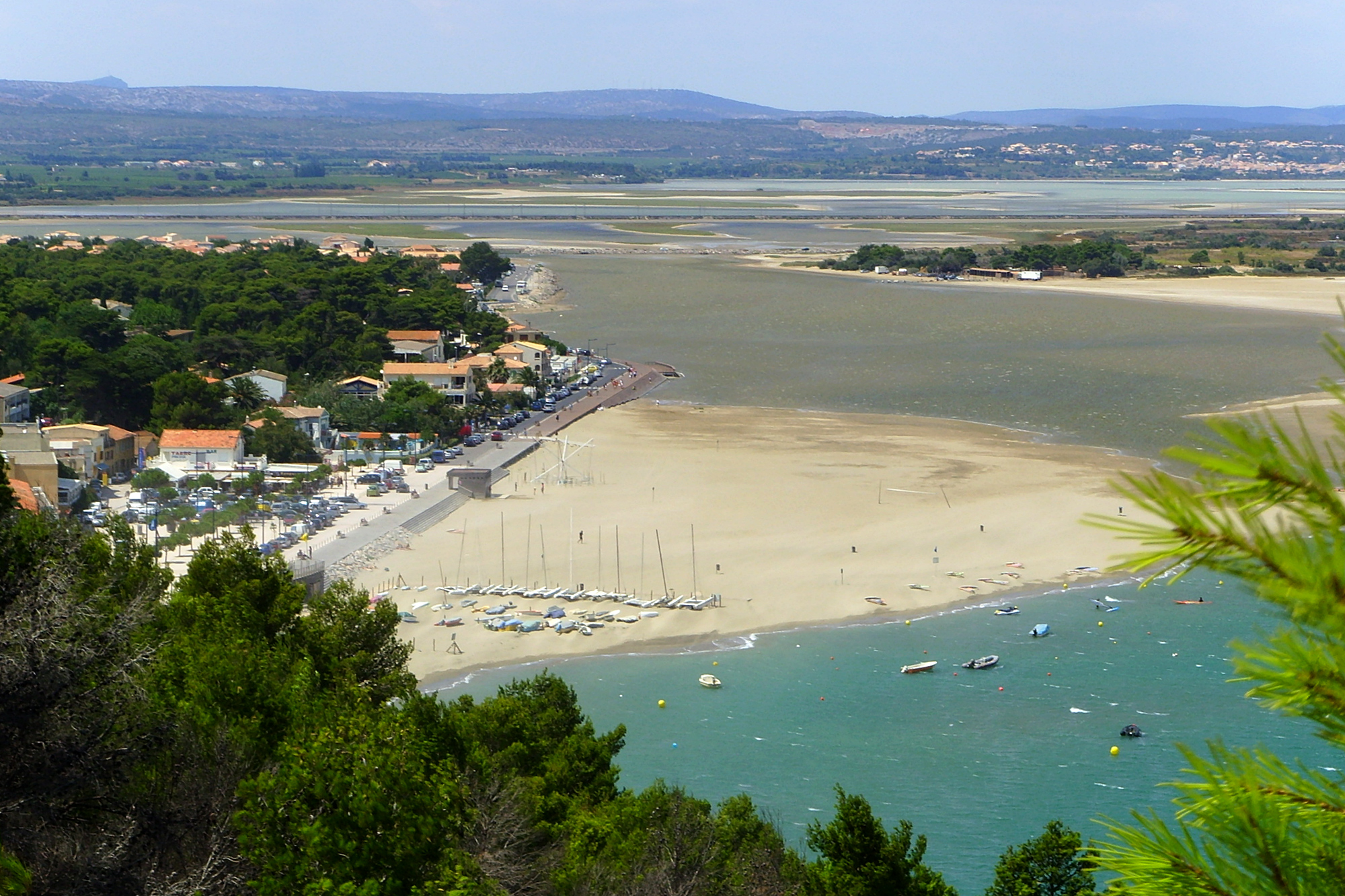
Beach at Leucate-La Franqui

Aude is a tourist department with a rich cultural heritage and varied natural sites. Since the 1990s, the Aude has developed the attractiveness of its territory by focusing on the development of the publicity surrounding Catharism. The Aude has been named Cathar Country by the General Council to mark the authentic and mysterious nature of the department, especially with its many Cathar castles.

Tourism is also promoted through a stock of hotel rooms in all categories of 313,500 beds available year-round. Aude estimates the number of tourist overnight stays to be 17.11 million in 2010 with a turnover of 842 million euros providing 5,800 full-time jobs and 9,500 seasonal jobs.

In a very limited section of the Orbiel Valley the department has had occasional pollution problems because of its abandoned gold mines (with mercury and arsenic).

=== Overview of tourist areas ===
Carcassonne has been restored to much of its medieval appearance. Narbonne is a tourist destination due to its Roman ruins. Other towns and villages worth visiting include Limoux, Quillan, Lézignan-Corbières, Lagrasse, Sigean and Leucate.

Limoux lies in the upper Aude valley, 24 km south of Carcassonne. It is known for its local wine, Blanquette, a sparkling white wine which is said to have been the forerunner of Champagne. Limoux hosts an extensive and varied market each Friday.

Quillan lies 27 km further south in the upper Aude valley and is at the head of the branch railway from Carcassonne.

Lézignan-Corbières lies on the main road between Carcassonne and Narbonne. It is called the capital of the Corbières and has a Wednesday morning market.

Lagrasse stands on the River Orbieu and has an 8th-century abbey, two bridges, and a well-preserved medieval stone village centre.

Sigean, 18 km south of Narbonne, lies between the A9 autoroute and the coast and has an African Reserve.

Leucate is a hilltop village, about 30 km south of Narbonne, which has spread down to the coast where Leucate Plage is a popular beach resort.

The Corbières Massif forms the central part of the department. It is an area of dissected plateaux and escarpments that form an effective barrier to direct road communication, characterized by steep hills, valleys, woodland, and vineyards. It contains several notable Cathar sites including Quéribus, Peyrepertuse, and Villerouge-Termenès.

The Lauragais, that spreads on both sides of the administrative border between Aude and Haute-Garonne, is a historic and cultural area known since the Middle Ages for its abundant agricultural productions. With Castelnaudary as a central and major city, this region is also famous for the role it played during the Albigensian Crusade and for its local heritage: Canal du Midi and its springs, abbeys and churches, castles, disk-shaped steles, dovecotes, windmills, bastides, etc.

Wine production is extensive across Aude, and local chateaux and domaines provide free tastings as well as sales of wine and other local produce. With the decline of some local wine production, local government policy is now to attract more tourists to the area, and to assist with this the Corbières area is now labelled on maps and road signs as Cathar country.

=== Architectural heritage ===
The Aude has about fifteen bastides which were built after the Treaty of Meaux in 1229 when the region was attached to the Capetian crown of France. The bastide is a type of town based on a grid created in one building project on a greenfield site. The purpose of such construction was to weaken the local lords and attract people to new economic centres. These bastides came into competition with fortified villages based on ecclesiastical or seigneurial power. Chalabre, Camps-sur-l'Agly and the Bastide Saint-Louis in Carcassonne are examples of bastides in the Aude.

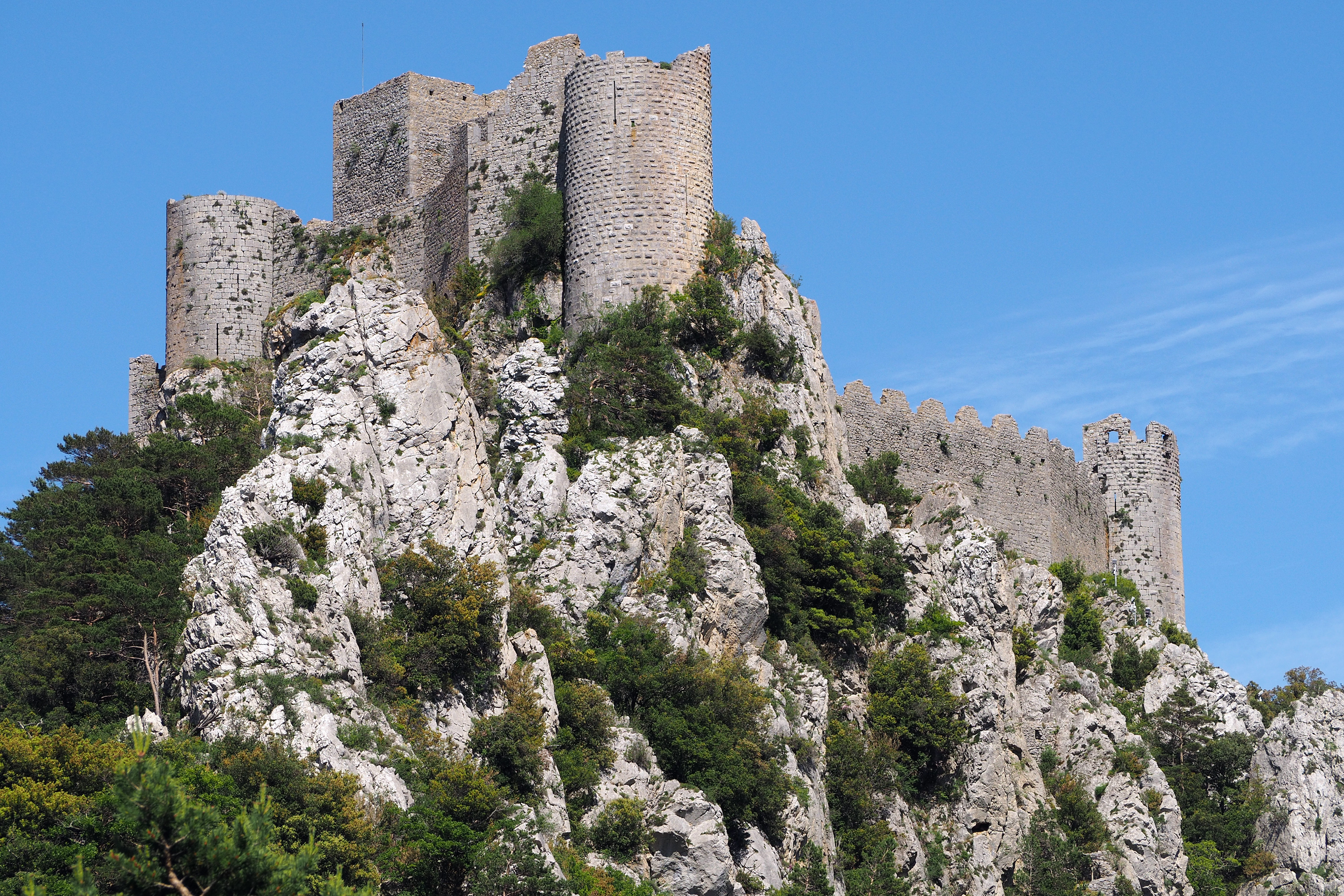
Puilaurens Castle

The department has many castles that have been developed by the General Council of the Aude to stimulate tourism. The fortresses are often located on rocky peaks, such as the castles of Quéribus and Lastours, which gave them a strategic position. The city of Carcassonne was the logistical hub of the country at the time of conflict with the Kingdom of Aragon.

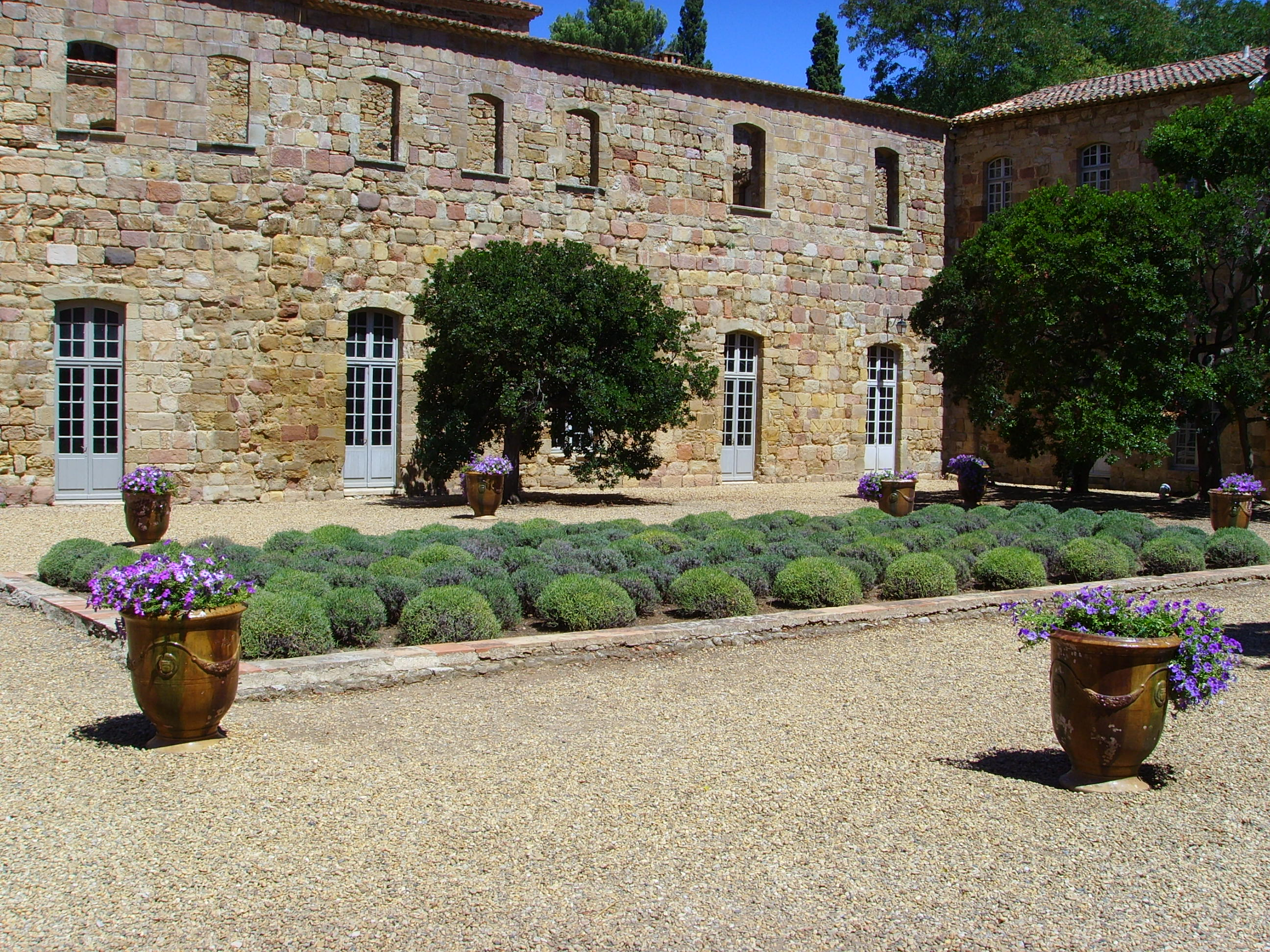
Fontfroide Abbey, Tourism highlight of Aude

Many abbeys exist throughout the department of Aude. The best known are Fontfroide Abbey, Lagrasse Abbey, the abbey of Sainte-Marie Villelongue-d'Aude, and the Abbey of Saint-Hilaire.

Narbonne Cathedral is a remarkable Gothic cathedral and remains unfinished. It is a symbol of the French presence in Languedoc in the Middle Ages.

=== Caving ===
Aude has many caves suitable for speleological exploration. The Pays de Sault consists of one of the largest limestone areas of the Pyrenees. This geology lends itself to the formation of cavities and there are many 'barrencs' (the local name for Pit caves). This plateau is home to a cave, the TM71, which is a superb cavity classified as a natural reserve since 1987. This is unique in France.

Other natural cavities of the Aude contain concretions like the Pit cave of Cabrespine, the Aguzou Grotto, and the grotto of Limousis. The latter contains the largest block of aragonite yet discovered. In the Massif of Corbières on the plateau of Lacamp there are cavities formed by detrital rocks (marls, clays and puddingstone) carved by erosion.

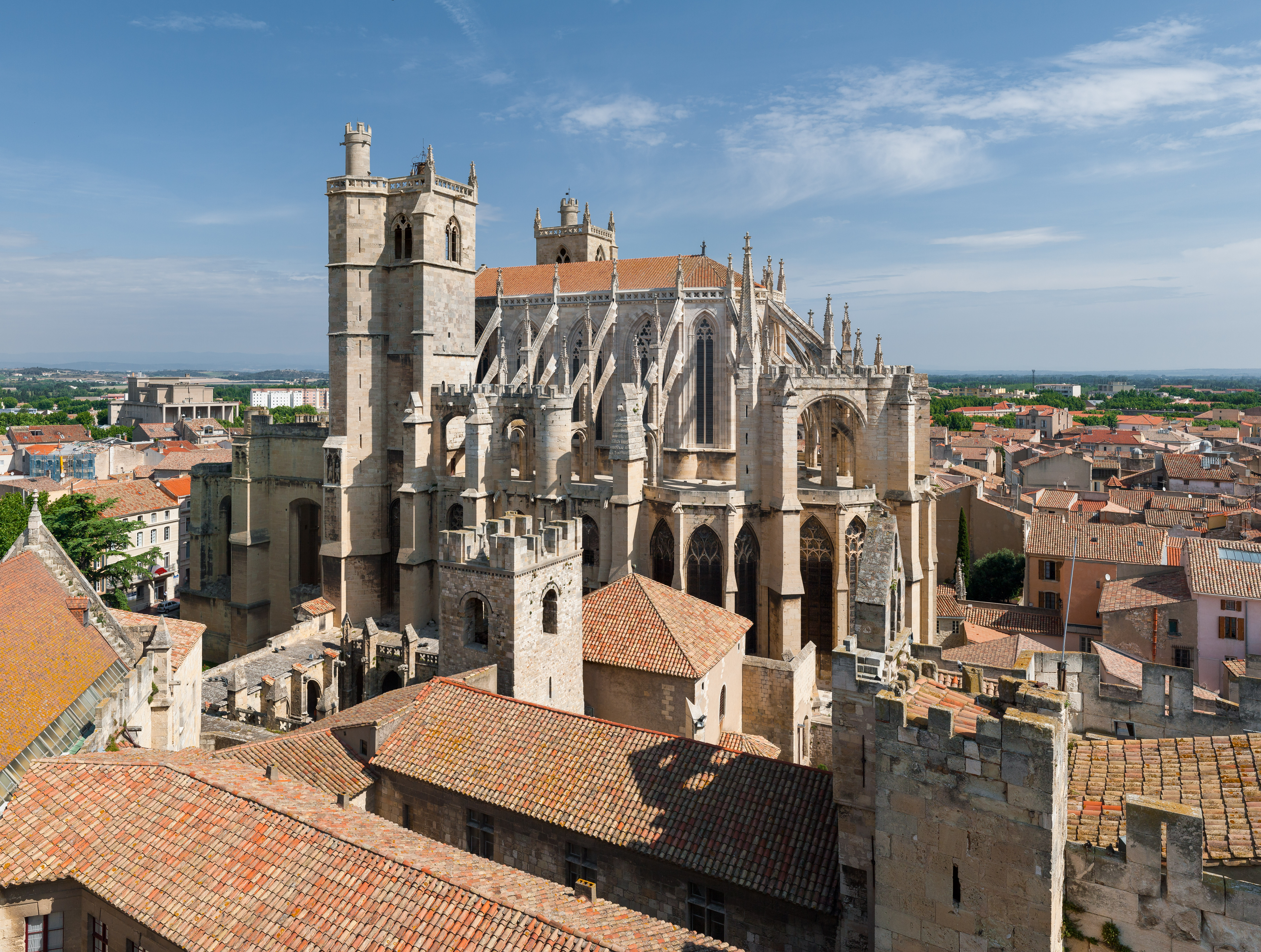
Narbonne

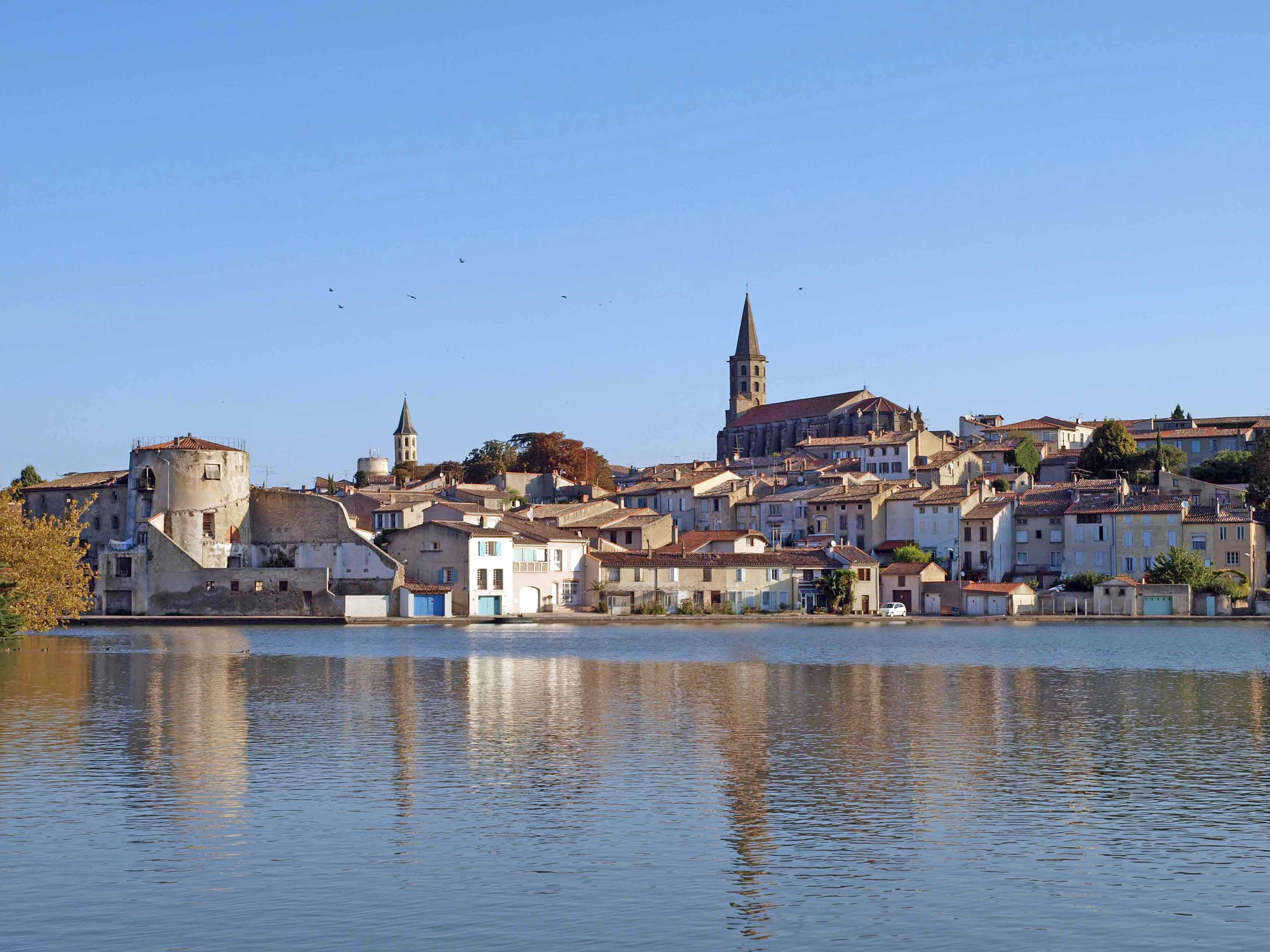
Castelnaudary

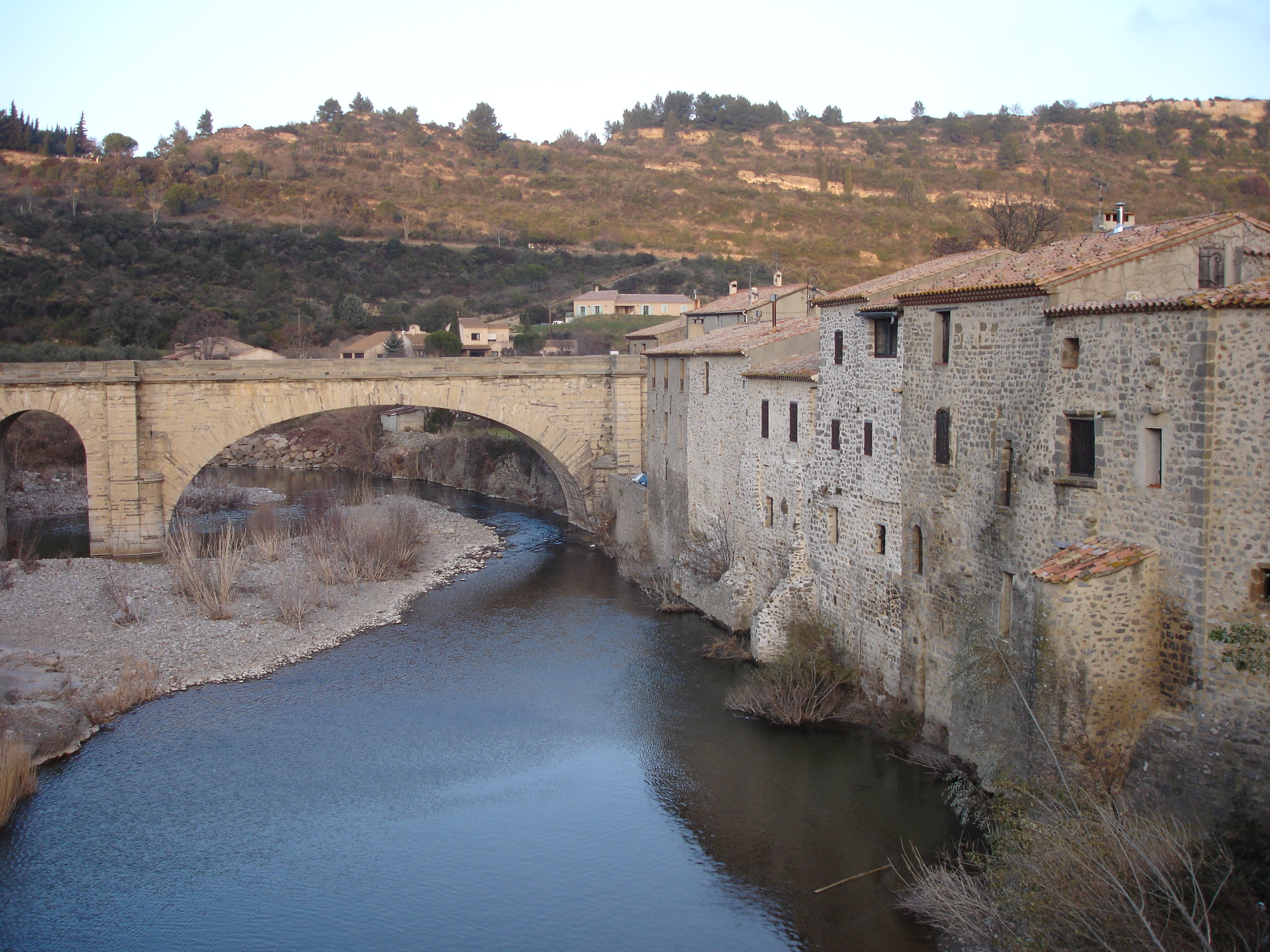
Lagrasse

=== Secondary housing ===
According to INSEE as of 2017 25.4% of available housing in Aude consisted of secondary residences. The following table indicates the main communes in Aude (population more than 2,000) where second homes or occasional residences comprise more than 10% of total housing.

Communes with more than 10% Secondary Residences (2017)

Town	Population	Number of homes	Second homes	% second homes
Leucate	4,428	16,240	13,662	84.1%
Gruissan	5,000	13,133	10,492	79.9%
Fleury	3,825	9,910	7,761	78.3%
Port-la-Nouvelle	5,567	7,514	4,546	60.5%
Sigean	5,477	3,485	635	18.2%
Quillan	3,258	2,697	462	17.1%
Ouveillan	2,463	1,389	229	16.5%
Narbonne	54,700	36,842	5,679	15.4%
Salles-d'Aude	3,255	1,767	261	14.8%

== Arts ==
=== Cinema ===
The diversity of the landscape, its authenticity, and the uniqueness of its monuments have attracted many filmmakers. Thus, the city of Carcassonne has been the setting for many films. The excellent state of preservation of this city offers an outstanding setting for historical films. In 1908 filmmakers abandoned scenery on canvas and Louis Feuillade filmed in front of the city towers for the Return of the cross, Engagement oath, and Enchanted guitar. In 1924 major films were produced such as Le Miracle des Loups by Raymond Bernard. In 1928 for the two thousandth anniversary of the city of Carcassonne, Jean Renoir made Le Tournoi dans la cité. In 1965 the city of Carcassonne appeared in The Sucker by Gerard Oury. In 1968 The Little Bather by Robert Dhéry (with Louis de Funès and Michel Galabru) shot at Cabanes de Fleury (at the mouth of the Aude).

More recently, the Count's castle in the city was the setting for The Visitors by Jean-Marie Poire in 1972, while the Château de Puivert was used in La Passion Béatrice by Bertrand Tavernier in 1987, and The Ninth Gate by Roman Polanski in 1999. The Beach at Gruissan is present in Betty Blue by Jean-Jacques Beineix.

=== Painters ===
As for the cinema, it is the city of Carcassonne which attracts the greatest painters. Jacques Ourtal is the one who painted most of the city in trying to depict the city in different eras. Originally from Fontiers-Cabardès, the Aude painter Eugène Pech has created paintings of the city many times which are today scattered in various public and private collections. The four eras of the city can still be found in settings for "The City Hall".

Another Aude artist, Marie-Louise Petiet, is known for her transcriptions of scenes of popular life such as La marchande d'oranges (The Orange Seller) or La jeune fille aux oies (The young girl and the geese). Several of her works are visible at the Petiet Museum in Limoux. Les blanchisseuses (The Laundresses) depicting a laundry lesson is particularly remarkable and well-known. Finally, Paul Sibra, an expert in landscape-painting, nicknamed "le peintre du Lauragais", produced thousands of paintings and drawings of scenes from or based on the rural life of the people of Lauragais in the 1940s.

Achille Laugé (born 1861 in Arzens, died 1944 in Cailhau), misunderstood because of his pointillist technique, was able to show the dawning of spring especially with the broom and almond trees in bloom.

Another artist, Lina Bill (real name Louis Bonnot), born at Gruissan in 1855 and died in Avignon in 1936, painted Provence and the Mediterranean (museums of Narbonne, Carcassonne, and the Musée d'Orsay in Paris).

== Notable people ==
- Publius Terentius Varro Atacinus (82 – c. 35 BC), Roman epic poet.
- Saint Prudent (3rd century), Archbishop of Narbonne and martyr
- Saint Sebastian (3rd century AD), Christian martyr, according to legend from Gallia Narbonensis.
- Ermengarde de Narbonne (1127–1196), Vicountess of Narbonne
- Fabre d'Eglantine (1750–1794), composer, actor, playwright, and politician, guillotined during the Terror.
- Félix Barthe (1795–1863), Minister of Education and Religious Affairs, Minister of Justice, and first president of the Court of Auditors
- Charles Cros (1842–1888), poet and scientist, he originated the process of colour photography and the phonograph
- Marcelin Albert (1851–1921), leader of the revolt of the wine growers in 1907
- Prosper Montagné (1865–1948), chef, author of numerous books on gastronomy
- Léon Blum (1872–1950), politician, Member of Parliament for Narbonne who became Prime Minister in 1936
- Louis Barthas (1879–1952), cooper, author, and veteran of WWI
- Henri de Monfreid (1879–1974), adventurer and writer, author of numerous books including the Secrets of the Red Sea
- Loís Alibèrt (1884–1959) Occitan linguist, notable author of a grammar and a dictionary based on classical standard Occitan
- Pierre Reverdy (1889–1960), writer, a precursor of surrealism
- Joseph Delteil (1894–1978) writer from Pieusse
- Joë Bousquet (1897–1950), poet and surrealist writer
- René Iché (1897–1954), modern sculptor and French Résistance fighter during WWII.
- Roger Peyrefitte (1907–2000) writer
- Charles Trenet (1913–2001), singer and poet born at Narbonne, famous for the song La Mer
- Jean Cau (1925–1993), writer, columnist, journalist, born in Bram, he was secretary for Jean-Paul Sartre
- Gérard Schivardi (1950–), Mayor of Mailhac, candidate in the French Presidential election of 2007
- Olivia Ruiz (1980–), singer, born in Carcassonne
- Dimitri Szarzewski (1983–), Hooker on the French Rugby Union Team
- Camille Lacourt (1985–), swimmer, born in Narbonne
- Spanghero Family, famous Rugby Union players, who began their careers at RC Narbonne
- Didier Codorniou, former international rugby player
- Amédée Domenech, former international rugby player

== See also ==
- County of Razès
- Cantons of the Aude department
- Communes of the Aude department
- Arrondissements of the Aude department
- Diocese of Aude
- Roman Catholic Diocese of Carcassonne-Narbonne

== Sources ==
- The Colours of Aude, André Authier and Jean-Philippe Vidal, Pélican ISBN 978-2-7191-0630-3 (in French)
- Aude from prehistory to today, Jacques Crémadeilis, Saint-Jean-d’Angély, 1989, 430 p. (in French)
- Aude People: biographical dictionary, Rémy Cazals and Daniel Fabre, Carcassonne, Association des Amis des Archives de l’Aude, Société d’études scientifiques de l’Aude, 1990, 347 p. (in French)
- Michel Gayraud, Narbonne ancient origins at the end of the 3rd century. Paris, De Boccard, Revue archéologique de Narbonnaise, Supplément 8, 1981, 591 p. (in French)
- History of Narbonne, Jacques Michaud and André Cabanis, Toulouse, Privat, 2004, 330 p. (in French)
- Aude, Cathar Country, collective work, Guides Gallimard, 2004 (in French)
- Bilotte M. et Al., Géology of the Department of Aude, Société d'études scientifiques de l'Aude, 1989 (in French)
- I write to you of Carcassonne, Claude Marti and Patrice Cartier, Du Mont, 2011 (in French)
