= Chalabre =

Commune in Occitanie, France

- Commune
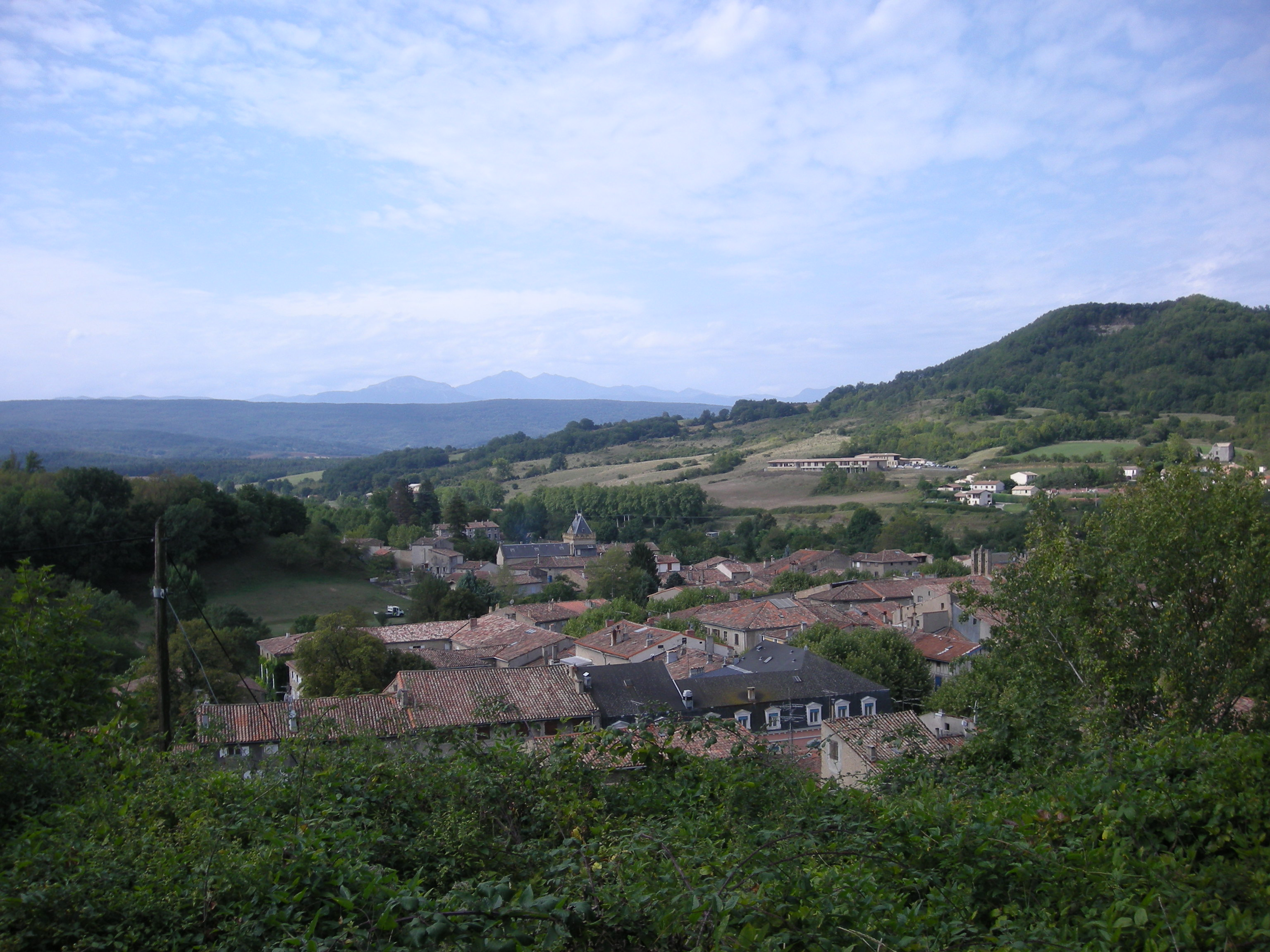
- A general view of Chalabre

- Coat of arms
- Location of Chalabre
- Location within France Location within Occitanie
- Coordinates: 42°59′05″N 2°00′25″E
- Country: France
- Region: Occitania
- Department: Aude
- Arrondissement: Limoux
- Canton: La Haute-Vallée de l'Aude

Government
  - Mayor (2020–2026): Jean-Jacques Aulombard
- Area^{1}: 15.49 km^{2} (5.98 sq mi)
- Elevation: 377 m (1,237 ft)
- Highest elevation: 646 m (2,119 ft)
- Lowest elevation: 357 m (1,171 ft)
- Population (2023): 1,084
  - Density: 69.98/km^{2} (181.2/sq mi)
- Time zone: UTC+01:00 (CET)
  - Summer (DST): UTC+02:00 (CEST)
- INSEE/Postal code: 11091 /11230
- ^{1} French Land Register data, which excludes lakes, ponds, glaciers > 1 km^{2} (0.386 sq mi or 247 acres) and river estuaries.

Chalabre (French pronunciation: [ʃalabʁ]; Languedocien: Eissalabra) is a commune in the Aude department in southern France. The capital of the Quercorb region, it is noted for its bastide. The road to Lac de Montbel runs through the town.

== History ==
Along with Mirepoix, Chalabre was damaged in a flood in the late 13th century following the uncontrolled draining of a lake at Puivert.

== Population ==
Historical population
Year	Pop.	±% p.a.
1968	1,838	—
1975	1,583	−2.11%
1982	1,441	−1.33%
1990	1,262	−1.64%
1999	1,172	−0.82%
2007	1,144	−0.30%
2012	1,115	−0.51%
2017	1,118	+0.05%
2023	1,084	−0.51%
Source: INSEE

== Personalities ==
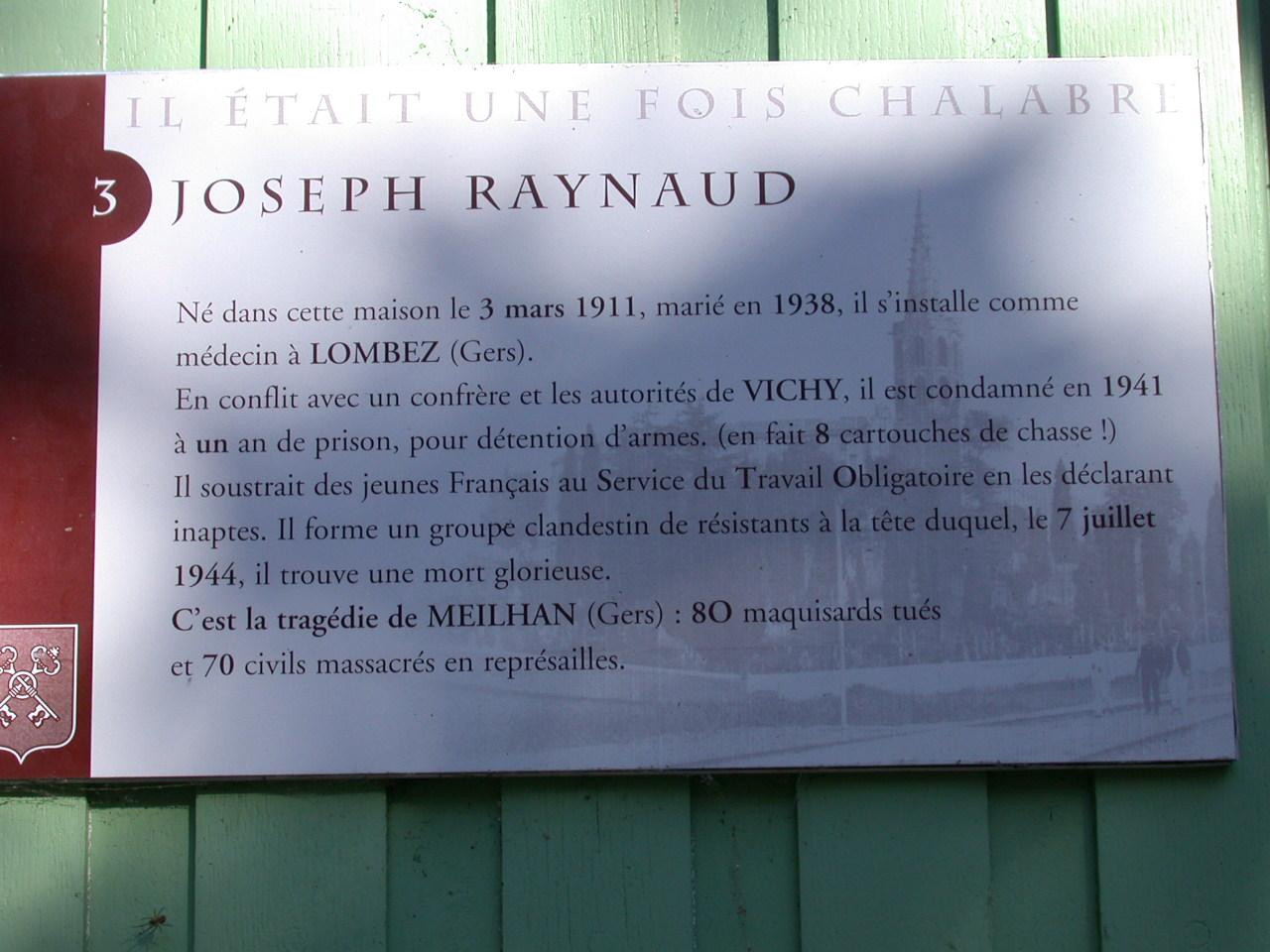
Plaque in memory of Joseph Raynaud

Jean Danjou, one of the most famous commanders of the French Foreign Legion, was born in Chalabre in 1828. He commanded the legionnaires at the celebrated Battle of Camarón.

A small plaque celebrates the birth of Joseph Raynaud in 1911. He went on to join the local Maquis in the Gers and was executed by the Germans on 7 July 1944.

== See also ==
- Communes of the Aude department
