= Château de Puivert =

Cathar castle in Aude, France

Coordinates: 42°55′16″N 2°03′18″E

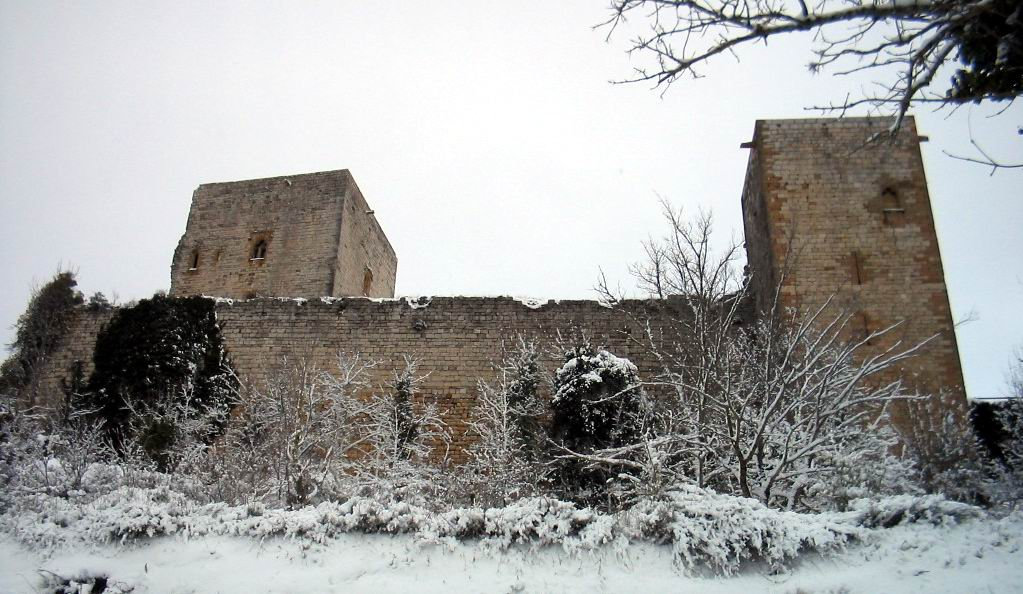
Château de Puivert

The Château de Puivert (Languedocien: Castèl de Puègverd) is a so-called Cathar castle situated in the commune of Puivert, in the Aude département of France. The castle has been classified as a monument historique by the French Ministry of Culture since 1907. This building, on top of a hill overhanging the village and its lake, reaches an elevation of 605 m. The site is in the Quercob region, 60 km (37 mi) south of Carcassonne and 45 km (28 mi) east of Foix.

== History ==
=== The first castle ===
The construction of the present castle dates from the 12th century. The first mention is in 1170; it belonged to the Congost family before the Albigensian Crusade. These lords practised Catharism and were accused as heretics. Then, in November 1210, the castle was subjected for three days to a siege by the army of Thomas Pons de Bruyère, lieutenant of Simon de Montfort. The castle subsequently became the property of the northern barons. All that is left of this older castle is a few sections of wall to the east. A collapse of the natural dam on the lake at the foot of the site caused the destruction of part of the town of Mirepoix, 30 km to the north, in Ariège in 1279. According to legend, this was because a certain Dame Blanche wanted to daydream on the lake shores, which were inaccessible in bad weather. She asked that the water level be lowered and work undertaken to accomplish this goal led to the collapse.

=== The present castle ===
At the start of the 14th century, Thomas de Bruyère (grandson of Pons) and his wife Isabelle de Melun had the new castle built to the east of the old castle. The remains of the old castle are still visible. The coat-of-arms of Isabelle de Melun, who was the daughter of a Grand Chamberlain of France, still exists in the 'new' castle. The building was given a symbolic and picturesque character that can still be seen today.

The castle was classified as a monument historique (historic monument) in 1907. The castle is privately owned. Thanks to its very well preserved keep it has been a location for many films, including The Ninth Gate and Le Peuple migrateur.

=== The minstrels' room ===
On the fourth floor of the keep is the minstrels' room (salle des musiciens). It is so called because eight very fine sculptures of musicians with their instruments are represented in the room. Legend has it that the town of Puivert welcomed a great gathering of troubadours in the 12th century. The instruments seen in the room are the bagpipes, flute, tambourin, rebec, lute, gittern, portable organ, psaltery and the bowed hurdy-gurdy.

Elsewhere in the town is a museum (Musée du Quercob) showing the musical tradition of the region from this period.

== Description ==
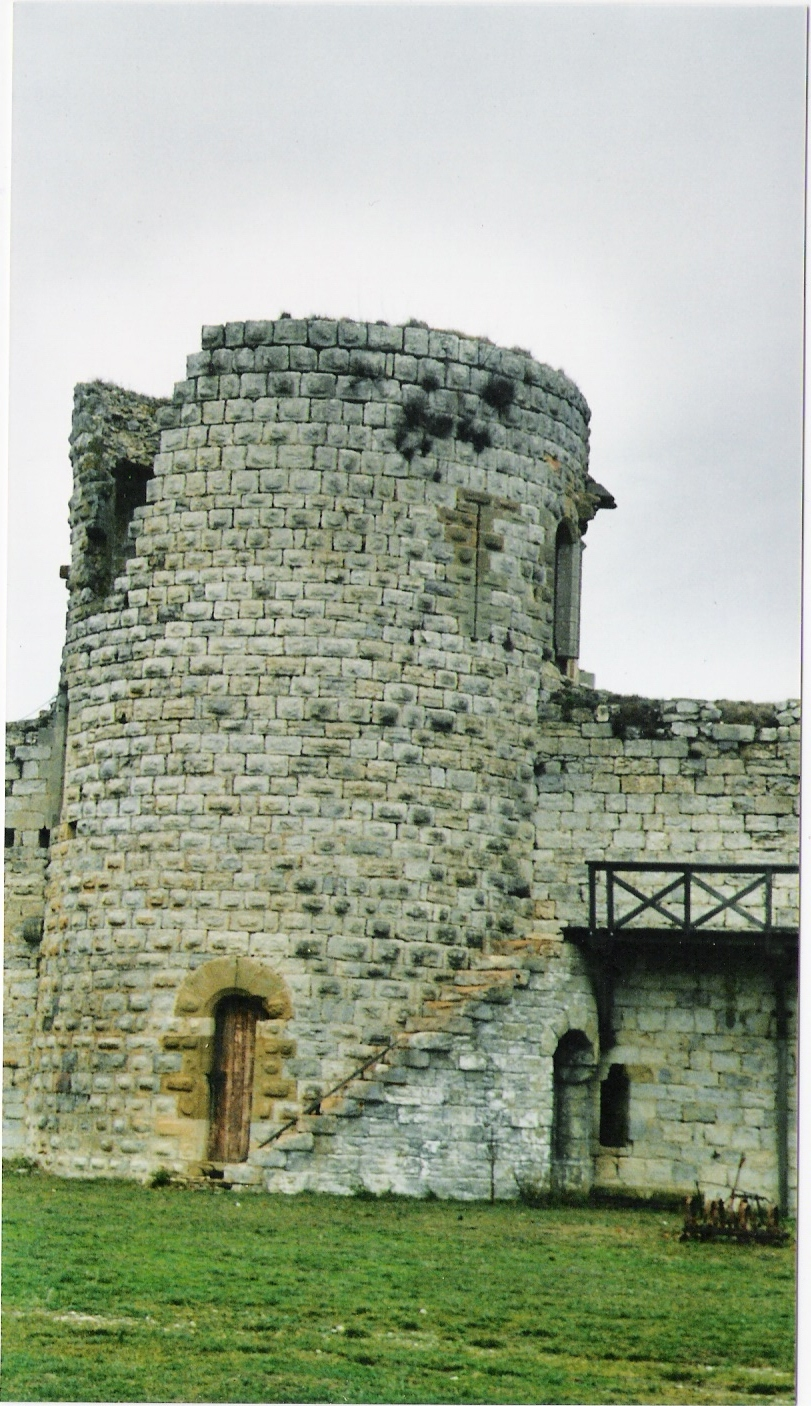
One of the towers of Château de Puivert

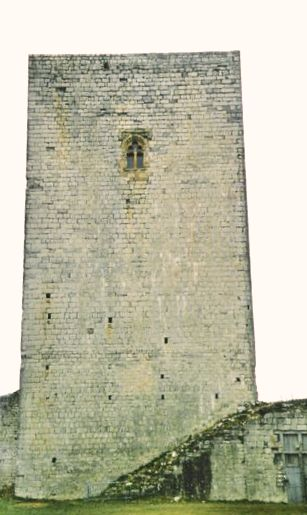
Keep of the Château de Puivert

=== The walls ===
The castle's functions were military: lookout and defence, unlike many buildings of the era which had religious goals. The curtain wall extends for 175 m, pierced with arrow slits. It is rectangular in plan. The moat which separated it from the plateau is practically invisible today. The entrance to the courtyard is through a square gate tower, situated in the centre of the east wall.

Five of the original eight towers remain:

- a smooth round tower in the northeast corner
- a rough round tower in the middle of the north wall
- a square tower, with a windowed turret on the eastern side joining the two top floors
- remains of a round tower in the southeast
- the keep (the best preserved part of the castle).

As well as the central gateway in the east wall, there are two other doorways:

- one in the northwest corner defended by the keep
- another to the south of the keep giving access to the older castle.

The surface area of the site is very large: 3200 m² inside the walls.

=== The keep ===
The best preserved part of the castle, the square keep measures 15 m by 15 m with a height of 35 m. Originally, it adjoined the manor house. On the west of the tower can be seen pieces of perpendicular masonry, from which it can be deduced that the buildings were joined in this area. The keep comprises:

- two lower levels: partly underground, with barrel vaulting
- a third floor: the chapel is accessible through a doorway with a broken arch. The room is decorated with small columns, mouldings and shields. The ceiling is rib-vaulted; in the wall is a "piscina" (basin).
- a fourth floor: a rib-vaulted room, the culs-de-lampe sculpted with non-religious figures playing musical instruments - the Minstrels' Room ("Salle des Musiciens"). It is well lit, thanks to three windows resembling those of the chapel.
- the fifth and top floor: a defensive platform, originally surrounded with crenellations, provides views of the Quercob region.

== See also ==
- Puivert: the town with some history
- Cathar castles
- List of castles in France
- Cathars
- Albigensian Crusade

== Sources ==
- Châteaux médiévaux de l'Aude : Guide du visiteur, 25 sites du pays cathare; Archéologie du Midi médiéval; revue annuelle du Centre d'archéologie médiévale du Languedoc; supplément au tome 4, 1986.
- AUÉ, Michèle; (trans. Pleasance, Simon) (1992). Discover Cathar Country. Vic-en-Bigorre, France: MSM. ISBN 2-907899-44-9.
- MICHELIN Green Guide: Languedoc, Roussillon, Tarn Gorges (Michelin Tyre plc 1998) p317
