= Pieusse =

Commune in Occitanie, France

- Commune
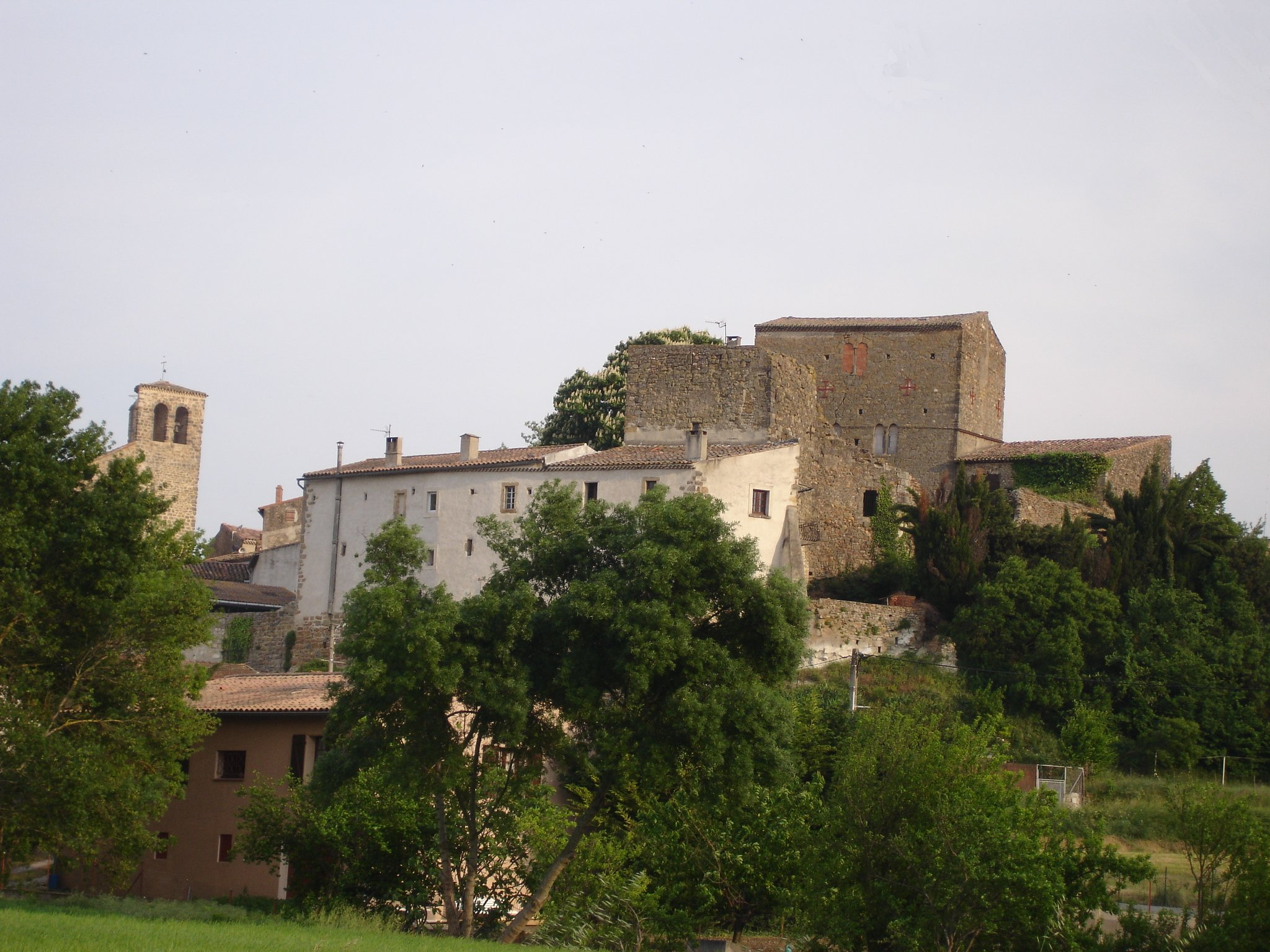
- The chateau in Pieusse

- Coat of arms
- Location of Pieusse
- Location within France Location within Occitanie
- Coordinates: 43°04′52″N 2°14′00″E
- Country: France
- Region: Occitania
- Department: Aude
- Arrondissement: Limoux
- Canton: La Région Limouxine
- Intercommunality: Limouxin

Government
  - Mayor (2020–2026): Yves Cabanne
- Area^{1}: 12.92 km^{2} (4.99 sq mi)
- Elevation: 175 m (574 ft)
- Highest elevation: 387 m (1,270 ft)
- Lowest elevation: 147 m (482 ft)
- Population (2023): 970
  - Density: 75/km^{2} (190/sq mi)
- Time zone: UTC+01:00 (CET)
  - Summer (DST): UTC+02:00 (CEST)
- INSEE/Postal code: 11289 /11300
- ^{1} French Land Register data, which excludes lakes, ponds, glaciers > 1 km^{2} (0.386 sq mi or 247 acres) and river estuaries.

Pieusse (French pronunciation: [pjøs]; Languedocien: Piussa) is a commune in the Aude department in southern France.

== Population ==
Historical population
Year	Pop.	±% p.a.
1968	458	—
1975	532	+2.16%
1982	697	+3.93%
1990	877	+2.91%
1999	906	+0.36%
2007	930	+0.33%
2012	1,002	+1.50%
2017	987	−0.30%
2023	970	−0.29%
Source: INSEE

== Transportation ==
The closest airport to Pieusse is Carcassonne Airport (15 km).

== See also ==
- Communes of the Aude department
