= Arrondissements of the Aude department =

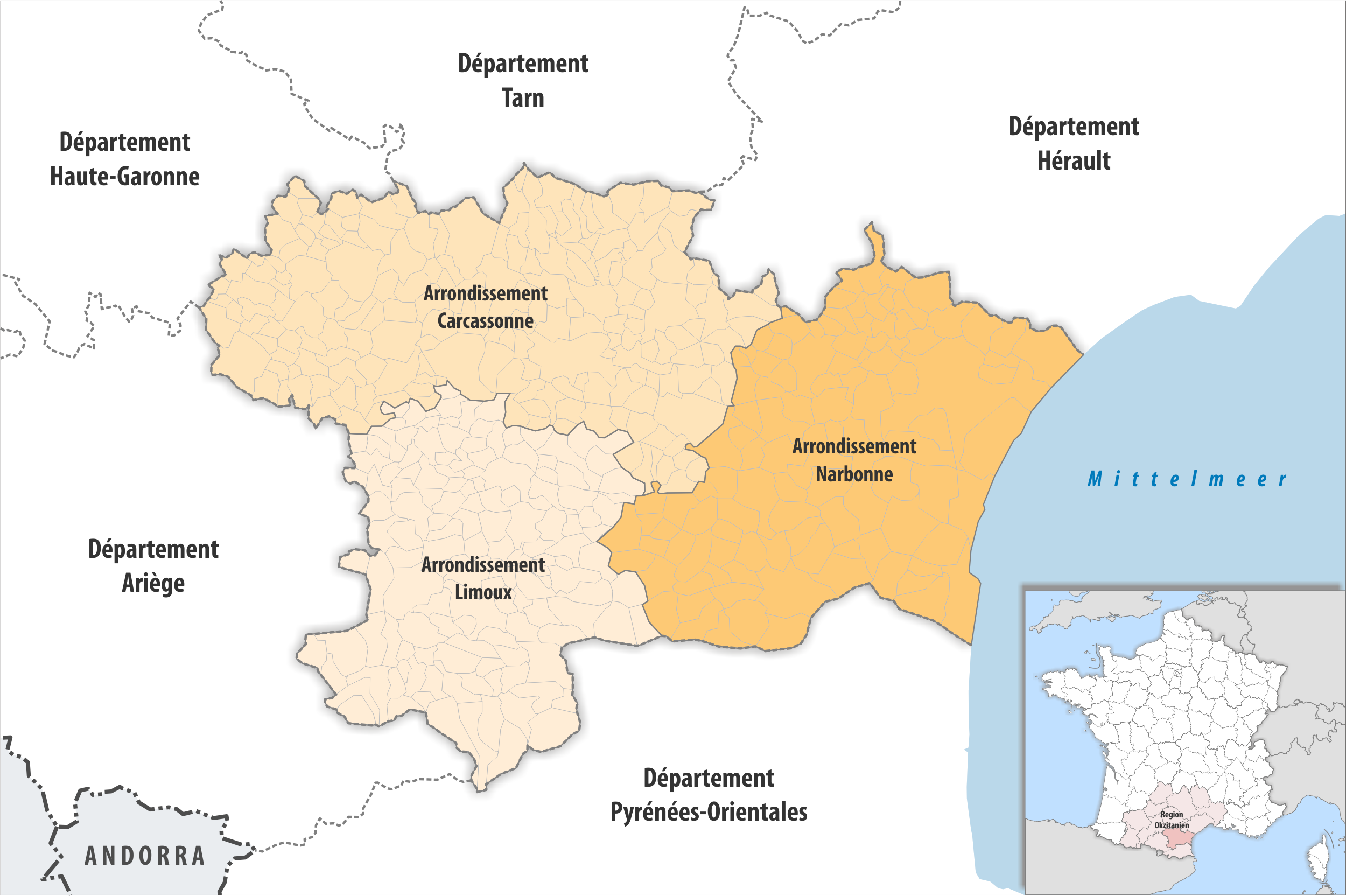
Map of arrondissements of the Aude department.

The 3 arrondissements of the Aude department are:

1. Arrondissement of Carcassonne, (prefecture of the Aude department: Carcassonne) with 186 communes. The population of the arrondissement was 163,034 in 2021.
2. Arrondissement of Limoux, (subprefecture: Limoux) with 138 communes. The population of the arrondissement was 42,296 in 2021.
3. Arrondissement of Narbonne, (subprefecture: Narbonne) with 109 communes. The population of the arrondissement was 170,698 in 2021.

== History ==
In 1800 the arrondissements of Carcassonne, Castelnaudary, Limoux and Narbonne were established. The arrondissement of Castelnaudary was disbanded in 1926.

The borders of the arrondissements of Aude were modified in January 2017:

- 27 communes from the arrondissement of Carcassonne to the arrondissement of Narbonne
- seven communes from the arrondissement of Limoux to the arrondissement of Carcassonne
