= Freginat =

Meat dish from France and Spain

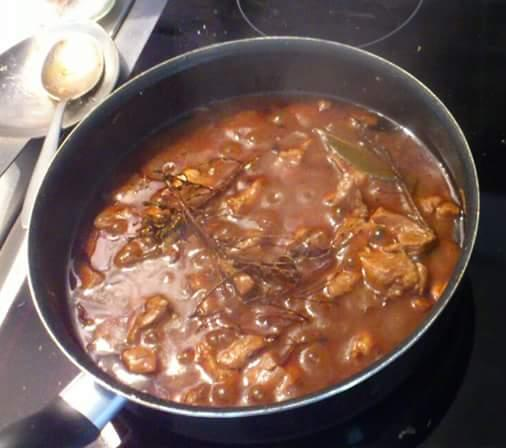
- fréginat corbières
- Type: Fricassée
- Place of origin: France and Spain
- Main ingredients: Pork

Freginat or fréginat, friginat, frésinat, or fraïzinat, is a fricassée from south-west France and north-west Spain. The meat is usually pork, and the dish is traditionally served in both the French and Spanish areas the day after the annual slaughtering of pigs.

== Etymology and history ==
Freginat probably derives from a Catalan word, fregit, or from the old French fréginer, themselves both from the Latin frigere, to fry. Examples in the 2009 Dictionary of Food are the Catalan freginat de fetge (fried calf's liver) and freginat de pollastre (chicken sautéed with onions and garlic). A provençal take on the word comes from Frédéric Mistral, who defined it as "soft and mushy, like a poorly fried sheep's liver".

Although veal and chicken, as above, may be used as the basis of a freginat, as is lamb, and in Catalan Cuisine (1992) Colman Andrews notes that the term refers to "a dish of fried organ meats of some kind [and] is applied to a variety of dishes in different precincts of the països calans", the usual meat is pork. John Burton-Race records that into the 21st century pigs were slaughtered in farms in rural Occitanie on a Sunday in February, with a frégnat served the following day, after the pig had been butchered.

== Contents ==
In his 2014 Dictionnaire du cochon, Robert Gordienne writes, "Certainly, one would have to be a hardened criminal to forget the fréginat or friginat, frésinat as in the Tarn or fraïzinat as they say in the Corbières. Yet the fréginat, dear to the people of Lacaune, is essentially the dish of Saint-Cochon".

Gordienne describes the dish as "a fricassée with the neck of the beast" and adds that there is no single agreed recipe nor any culinary "ayatollahs" to impose one. In his 1998 La cuisine secrète du Languedoc-Roussillon, André Soulier commends the "rule of three": a third each of pork loin, lean pork and pork liver. In a version from the Carcassonne region no liver or other offal is included. The dish is traditionally served with white haricot beans.

== Sources ==
- Andrews, Colman (1992). Catalan Cuisine: Europe's Last Great Culinary Secret. New York: Collier. ISBN 978-0-02-009075-5.
- Burton-Race, John (2004). French Leave: A Wonderful Year of Escape and Discovery. London: Ebury. ISBN 978-0-09-189830-4.
- Fàbrega, Jaume (2003). La cuina del país dels càtars (in Catalan). Valls: Cossetània. ISBN 978-8-49-603580-5.
- Gordienne, Robert (2014). Dictionnaire du cochon. Paris: Balland. ISBN 978-2-35-315227-8.
- Létoile, Valérie-Anne (1987). Le Grand livre de la cuisine. Paris: Éditions de la Seine. ISBN 978-2-73-820039-6.
- Mistral, Frédéric (1879). Lou trésor dóu Felibrige: Dictionnaire provençal-français. Aix-en-Provence: Remondet-Aubin. OCLC 1048786336.
- Sinclair, Charles (2009). Dictionary of Food: International Food and Cooking Terms from A to Z. London: A. C. Black. ISBN 978-1-40-810218-3.
- Soulier, André (1998). La cuisine secrète du Languedoc-Roussillon. Montpellier: Les Presses du Languedoc. ISBN 978-2-85-998199-0.
