= Pays de Sault =

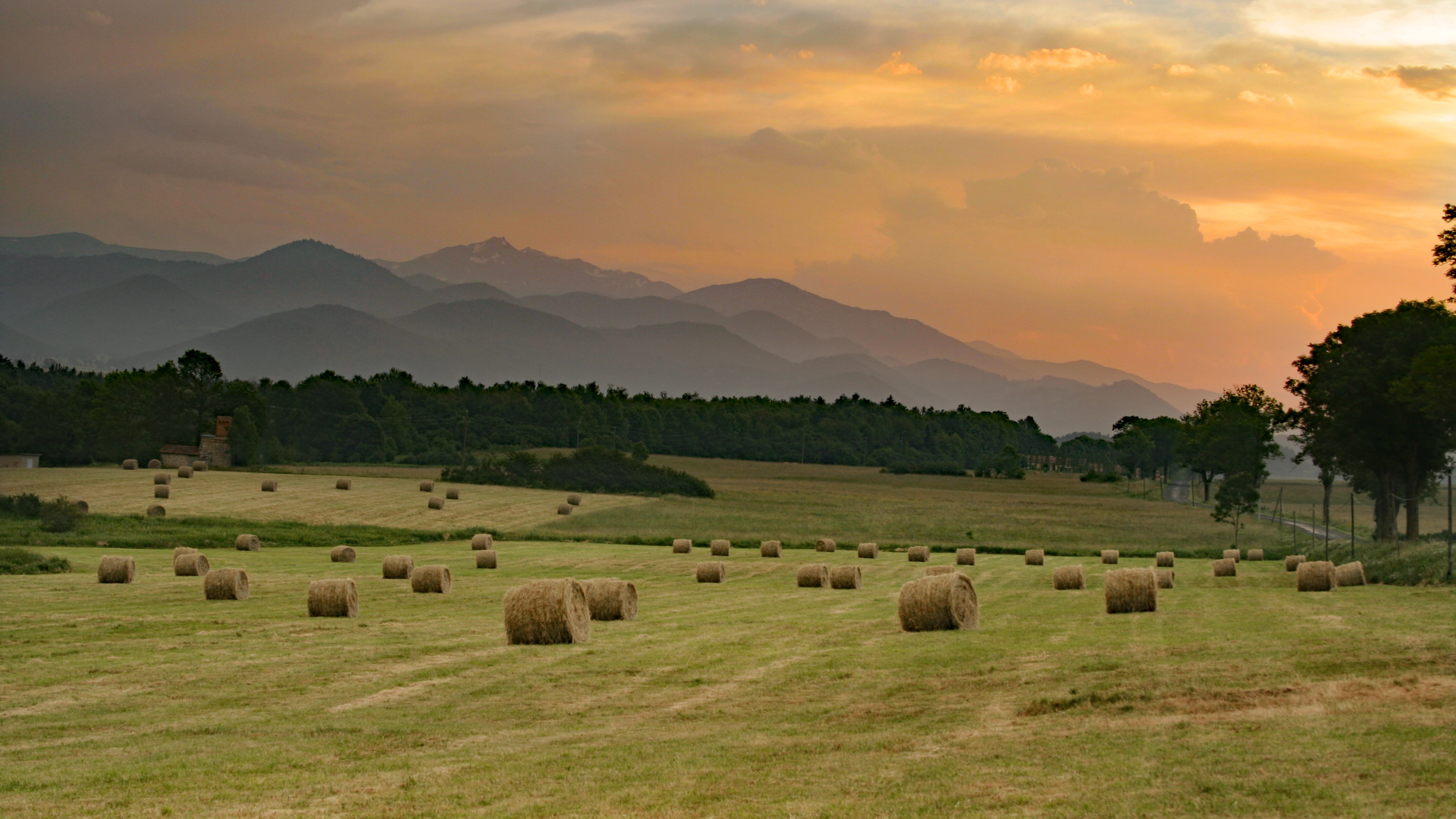
- Interactive map of Pays de Sault
- Country: France
- Region: Occitania

The Pays de Sault is a small natural region in the department of Aude in southern France. Situated in the heart of the Pyrenees, this region is at an elevation between 990 and 1,310 meters.

The Pays de Sault region consists of three main geographical features:

- The Roquefortès
  - Roquefort-de-Sault
- Rodome, a small plateau
- Espezel-Belcaire-Camurac, a large plateau
