= Cantons of the Aude department =

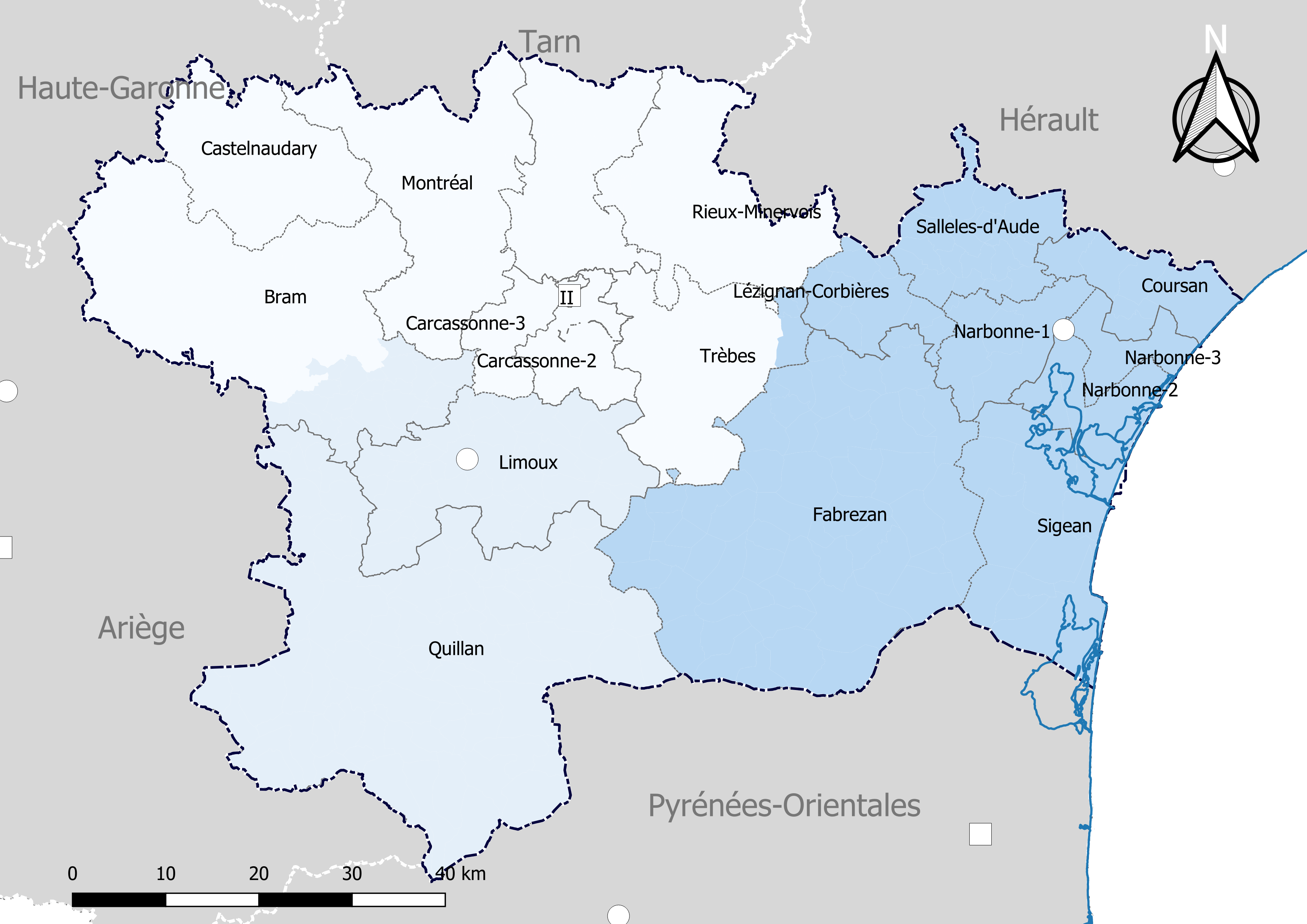
Cantons of the Aude department

The following is a list of the 19 cantons of the Aude department, in France, following the French canton reorganisation which came into effect in March 2015:

- Les Basses Plaines de l'Aude
- Le Bassin chaurien
- Carcassonne-1
- Carcassonne-2
- Carcassonne-3
- Les Corbières
- Les Corbières Méditerranée
- La Haute-Vallée de l'Aude
- Le Haut-Minervois
- Le Lézignanais
- La Malepère à la Montagne Noire
- La Montagne d'Alaric
- Narbonne-1
- Narbonne-2
- Narbonne-3
- La Piège au Razès
- La Région Limouxine
- Le Sud-Minervois
- La Vallée de l'Orbiel
