= Corbières, Aude =

Commune in Occitanie, France

Corbières
- Commune
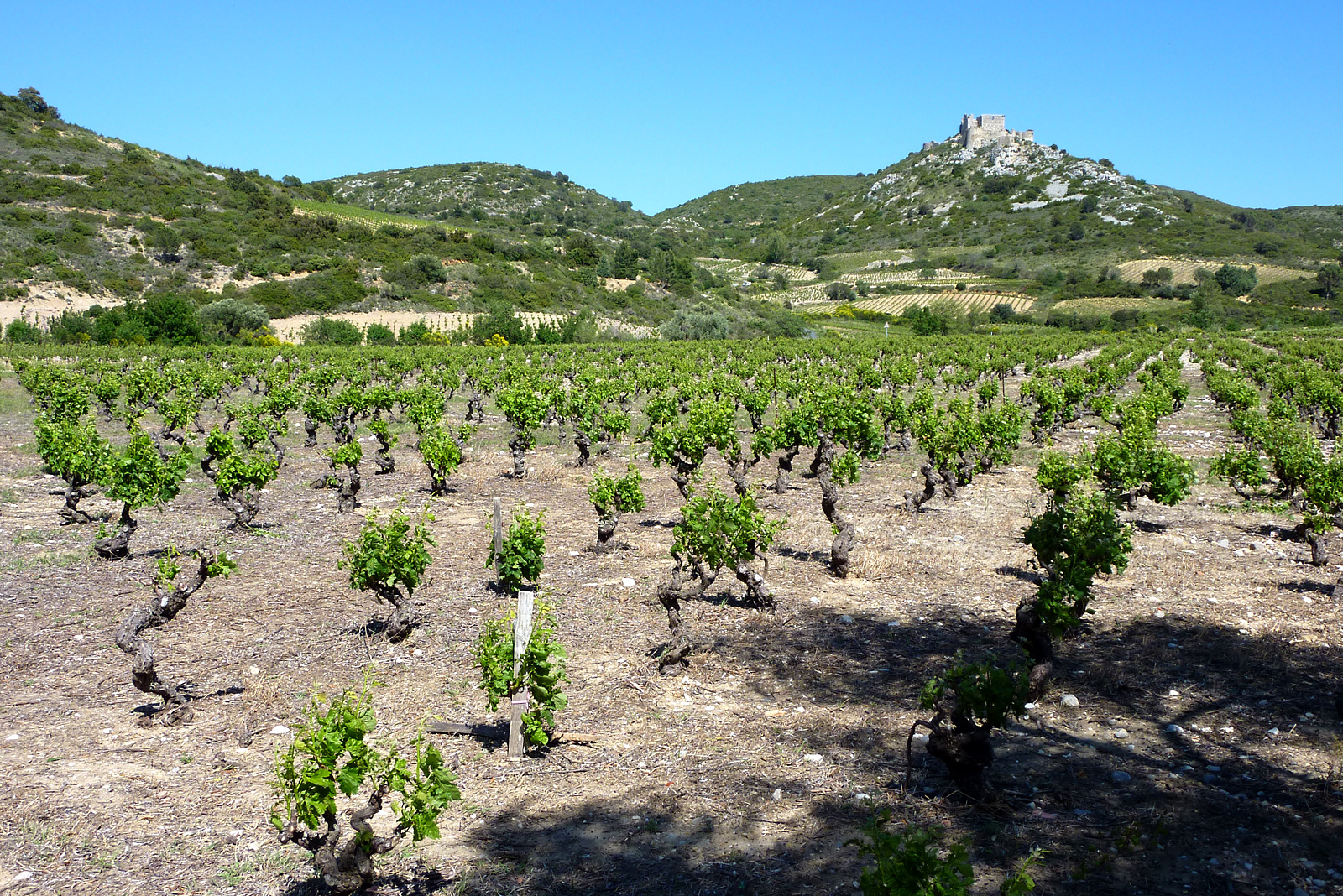
- The ruins of the Castle
- Location of Corbières
- Location within France Location within Occitanie
- Coordinates: 43°02′27″N 1°59′27″E
- Country: France
- Region: Occitania
- Department: Aude
- Arrondissement: Limoux
- Canton: La Haute-Vallée de l'Aude

Government
  - Mayor (2020–2026): Eric Astier
- Area^{1}: 8.53 km^{2} (3.29 sq mi)
- Elevation: 540 m (1,770 ft)
- Highest elevation: 610 m (2,000 ft)
- Lowest elevation: 354 m (1,161 ft)
- Population (2023): 38
  - Density: 4.5/km^{2} (12/sq mi)
- Time zone: UTC+01:00 (CET)
  - Summer (DST): UTC+02:00 (CEST)
- INSEE/Postal code: 11100 /11230
- ^{1} French Land Register data, which excludes lakes, ponds, glaciers > 1 km^{2} (0.386 sq mi or 247 acres) and river estuaries.

Corbières (French pronunciation: [kɔʁbjɛʁ] ；Occitan: Corbièras) is a commune in the Aude department in southern France.

== Population ==
Historical population
Year	Pop.	±% p.a.
1968	26	—
1975	27	+0.54%
1982	35	+3.78%
1990	33	−0.73%
1999	26	−2.61%
2007	36	+4.15%
2012	38	+1.09%
2017	27	−6.61%
2023	38	+5.86%
Source: INSEE

== See also ==
- Communes of the Aude department
