= Spanghero (surname) =

Spanghero is a French surname. Notable people with the surname include:

- Claude Spanghero (born 1948), French rugby union footballer
- Nicolas Spanghero (born 1976), French rugby union footballer
- Walter Spanghero (born 1943), French rugby union footballer
