= Puivert =

Commune in Occitanie, France

- Commune
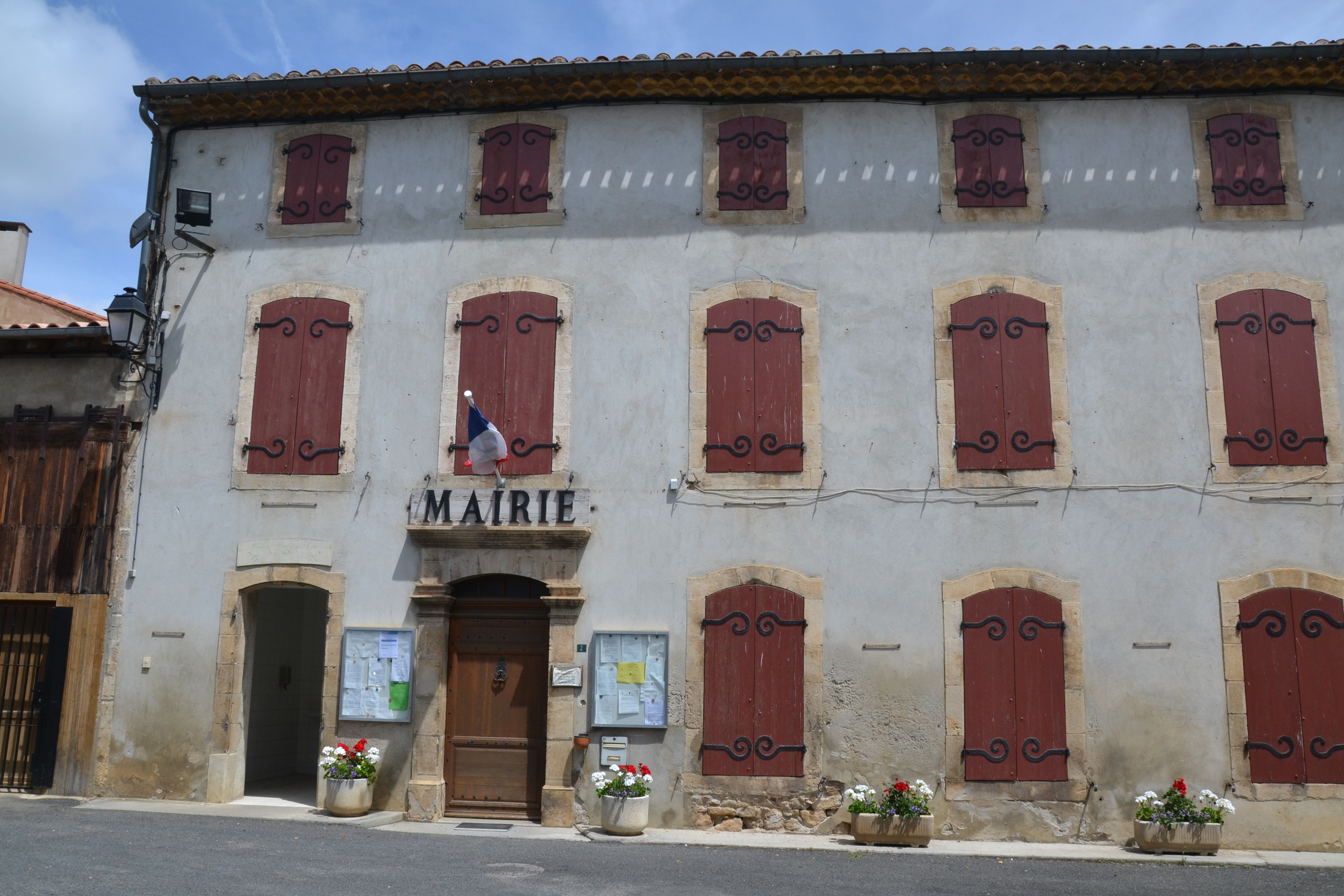
- The town hall in Puivert

- Coat of arms
- Location of Puivert
- Location within France Location within Occitanie
- Coordinates: 42°55′18″N 2°02′51″E
- Country: France
- Region: Occitania
- Department: Aude
- Arrondissement: Limoux
- Canton: La Haute-Vallée de l'Aude

Government
  - Mayor (2020–2026): Olivier Ferrier
- Area^{1}: 41.29 km^{2} (15.94 sq mi)
- Elevation: 438 m (1,437 ft)
- Highest elevation: 1,087 m (3,566 ft)
- Lowest elevation: 375 m (1,230 ft)
- Population (2023): 491
  - Density: 11.9/km^{2} (30.8/sq mi)
- Time zone: UTC+01:00 (CET)
  - Summer (DST): UTC+02:00 (CEST)
- INSEE/Postal code: 11303 /11230
- ^{1} French Land Register data, which excludes lakes, ponds, glaciers > 1 km^{2} (0.386 sq mi or 247 acres) and river estuaries.

Puivert (French pronunciation: [pɥivɛʁ]; Languedocien: Puègverd) is a commune in the Aude department in the Occitanie region in southern France.

== History ==
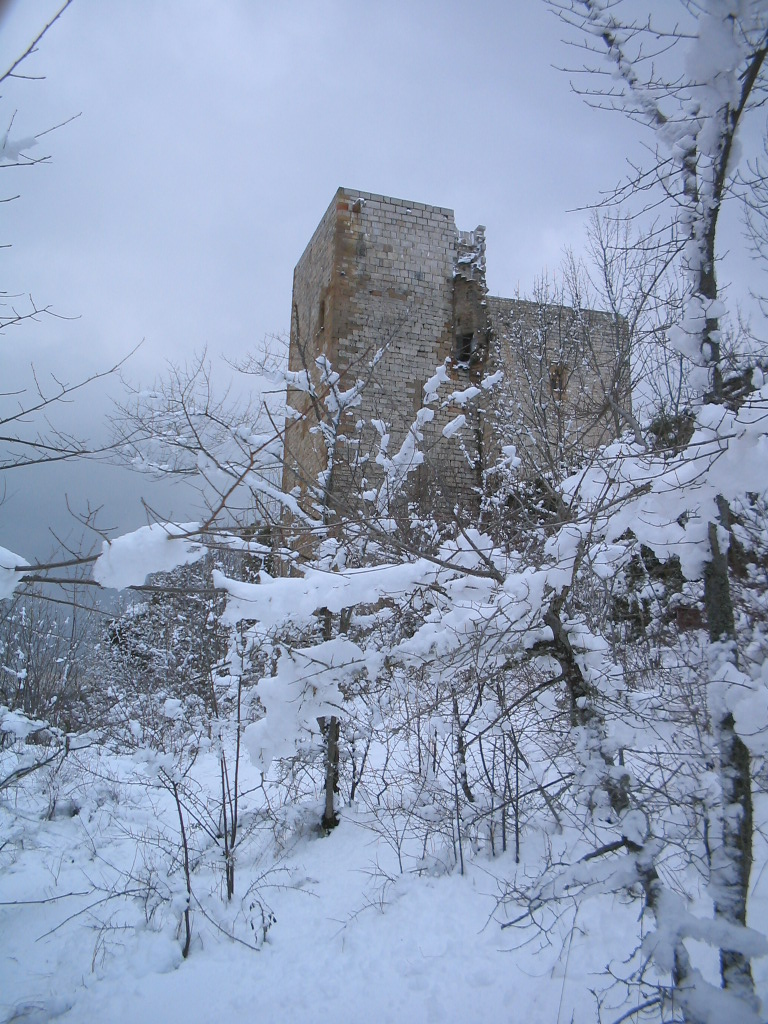
Chateau Puivert

In the 12th century a castle (Château de Puivert) stood on this site which had strong links to both Cathars and troubadours. A meeting of troubadours took place here in 1170, and in 1185 festivities attended by the Viscount of Carcassonne and Loba, Lady of Cabaret.

At the time of the Wars against the Cathars its seigneur was Bernard de Congost. His wife Alpaïs had become a Cathar Parfaite before her death in 1208. In November 1210 the Castle was besieged by Simon de Montfort, and fell after three days. The Congost family continued the fight against the invaders. Bernard died after receiving the Cathar Consolamentum at Montségur in 1232. His son continued the fight, participating in the events of Avignonet in 1242 and helping defend Montsegùr in 1243–4.

In 1213 the seigneurie, now in French hands, was conferred by Simon de Montfort on one of his lieutenants, Lambert de Thury. Later it was allocated to the Bruyère family.

The present castle is French, built by the Bruyère family in the 14th century, probably around 1310. It is still in relatively good condition. It is a key location in the novels "The Burning Chambers" and "The City of Tears" by Kate Mosse.

On 9 August 1944 the nearby commune of Lescale was burnt by German forces in reprisal for actions by the resistants of the maquis de Picaussel; two days previously, two of their number from Lescale, Joseph Lebret and Jean Carbou, had been killed by the Germans.

== Population ==
Historical population
Year	Pop.	±% p.a.
1968	683	—
1975	551	−3.02%
1982	552	+0.03%
1990	467	−2.07%
1999	410	−1.44%
2007	497	+2.43%
2012	521	+0.95%
2017	471	−2.00%
2023	491	+0.70%
Source: INSEE

== See also ==
- Communes of the Aude department
