= Ernest Ferroul =

French physician and politician

Ernest Joseph Antoine Ferroul
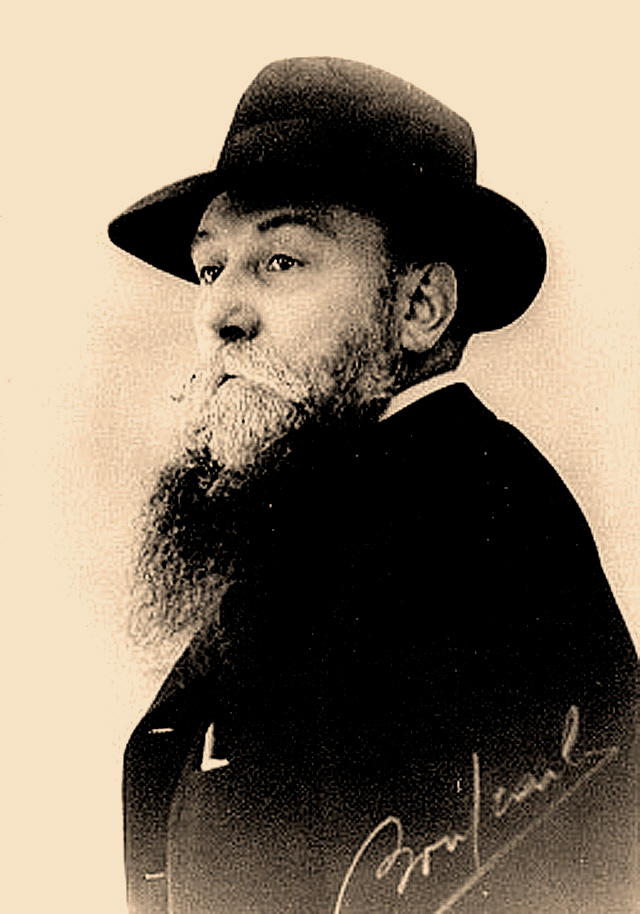
- Ferroul from an old postcard

Deputy for Aude
- In office 23 April 1888 – 14 October 1893

Deputy for Aude
- In office 26 February 1899 – 31 May 1902

Personal details
- Born: 13 December 1853 Mas-Cabardès, Aude, France
- Died: 29 December 1921 (aged 68) Narbonne, Aude, France
- Occupation: Physician, politician

Ernest Joseph Antoine Ferroul (13 December 1853 – 29 December 1921) was a French physician and politician. He held extreme left political views. He was twice a deputy for the southern department of Aude between 1888 and 1902, was first elected mayor of Narbonne in 1891 and held that office from 1903 until his death. He is known as one of the leaders of the successful 1907 revolt of the Languedoc winegrowers, in which up to 800,000 vineyard smallholders and workers demonstrated to demand government action to end unfair competition.

== Early years (1853–1888) ==
Ernest Joseph Antoine Ferroul, also known as "Lo Pelut", was born in Mas-Cabardès, Aude, on 13 December 1853. He became a physician and a socialist. He was a great defender of viticulture. He studied medicine at the University of Montpellier and received his doctorate. He contributed to the socialist newspapers in provincial cities such as Lyon, Marseille and Narbonne. He was director of La République sociale in Narbonne. He practiced as a physician in Narbonne and became a city councilor. In 1882 he founded the first socialist group in Narbonne, and then joined the Guesdists of the French Workers' Party (POF: Parti ouvrier français).

== First term as deputy (1888–1893) ==
Ferroul ran for the Radical Socialist party in the legislative by-election of 8 April 1888 to replace Pierre Papinaud, who had been appointed governor of Nosy Be, Madagascar. In the first round he won 24,987 votes against 18,898 for the opportunist candidate M. Coural and 8,498 for General Boulanger. Coural withdrew, and in the second round Ferroul defeated Boulanger by 29,645 votes to 4,468. He joined the socialist group in the chamber, and publicly protested against the "Boulangist" label he had been given. He participated in the Workers Congress in Troyes. In the chamber he voted for suppression of the Vatican embassy, but this measure was defeated. He voted against indefinite postponement of revision to the Constitution and against the prosecution of three deputies who were members of the Ligue des Patriotes. He abstained from voting on the draft Lisbonne law restricting the freedom of the press and on the prosecution of General Boulanger.

Ferroul was reelected in 1889, holding office until 14 October 1893. In the first round of election for the first constituency of Narbonne on 22 September 1889 he won 3,014 votes to 3,356 to the republican Douarche. In the second round on 6 October 1889 he won by 4,829 votes to 4,297. In these elections he was one of three Boulangists affiliated with the POF, the others being Christophe Thivrier of Allier and Antoine Jourde of Gironde. Friedrich Engels saw the elections as a success, counting Eugène Baudin, Thivrier and Félix Lachize as Marxists, and considering that Gustave Paul Cluseret and Ernest Ferroul were "bound to cast in their lot with the first three." On 19 November 1889 Baudin, Joseph Ferroul, Antide Boyer and Valentin Couturier proposed that the mines should be nationalized, and demands for nationalization of regulation grew as strikes spread across France. In the general elections of 1893 he was defeated in the first round of voting by Henri Rouzaud^{(fr)}, republican candidate of the government.

== Later career (1893–1921) ==
In 1891 Ferroul was elected mayor of Narbonne on the socialist list. He was suspended in 1892 but reelected in 1894, holding office until 1897, when he was defeated. He was reelected in 1900 but the election was cancelled. In 1902 he was elected with a strong majority and held office as mayor until 1921. In the May 1898 general elections Ferroul was narrowly defeated in the second round by Edmond Bartissol^{(fr)}. The election was annulled on 5 December 1898, and he was elected in a by-election on 26 February 1899. He held office as deputy for Aude until 31 May 1902. He did not run for reelection in the 1902 general elections. In the general elections on 6 May 1906 he ran again and was decisively defeated in the first round by Émile Aldy^{(fr)}.

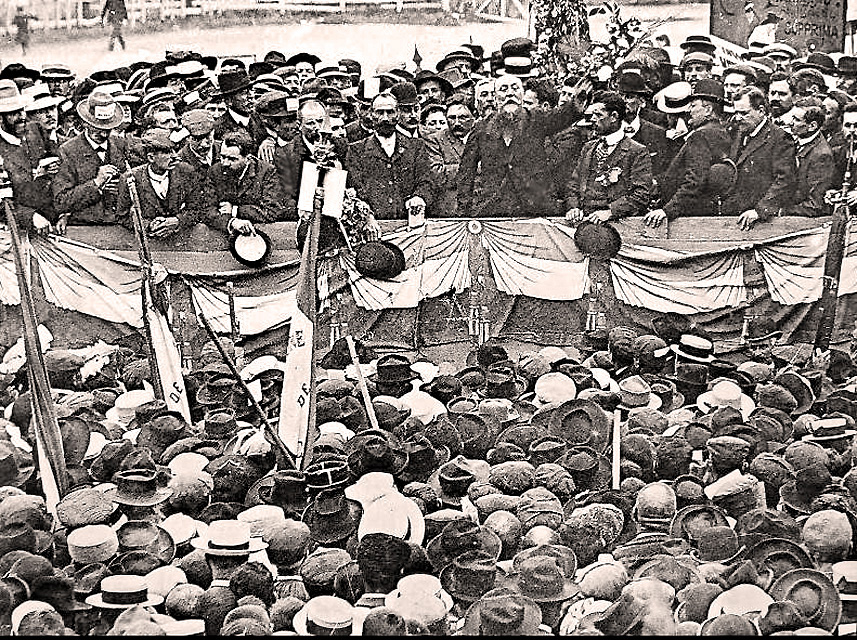
Meeting of winemakers addressed by Ernest Ferroul, Mayor of Narbonne, and Marcelin Albert

Ferroul was one of the leaders of the 1907 revolt of the Languedoc winegrowers who were protesting unfair competition. On 5 May 1907 a rally in Narbonne mobilized between 80,000 and 100,000 people. As mayor Ferroul took a stand for the struggle of the Midi winemakers. He told the crowd, "For a long time you have given credit to the state. The time has come where your debt is to be repaid ". On 12 May 1907 these were 150,000 demonstrators at a rally in Béziers. Ernest Ferroul advocated a tax strike if the government did not meet the winegrowers' demands by 10 June. On 26 May from 220,000 to 250,000 people demonstrated in Carcassonne. Ferroul played on the secular opposition between North and South in calling on the crowd to stand united.

On 9 June 1907 a gigantic gathering in Montpellier marked the climax of the vineyard challenge in the Midi. In his speech Ferroul called for the resignation of all his colleagues from Languedoc-Roussillon and openly advocated civic disobedience. The deadline for the ultimatum to the government came on 10 June 1907 and, standing on the balcony of the Hôtel de Ville of Narbonne, Ferroul announced his resignation as mayor and proclaimed the start of the municipal strike. On 12 June Ferroul spoke of the premier, "Monsieur Clemenceau, since the beginning of our demonstrations, has considered us as big children, good boys, but unaware of our actions. He is one of those who think that in the Midi everything ends with songs or farandoles. He is very wrong, he does not know us." Clemenceau asked Albert Sarraut to bring Ferroul to the negotiating table. Ferroul told him: "When we have three million men behind us, we do not negotiate".

On 19 June Ferroul was arrested at dawn at his home in Narbonne by troops of the 139th Infantry Regiment and imprisoned in Montpellier. Later the government passed the requested laws and the revolt's leaders were released. On 22 September 1907 the General Confederation of vine growers of the South (CGV) was constituted. Its main mission was to fight against fraud and to protect the social and economic interests of producers. The first president of the CGV was Ferroul and Elie Bernard became its Secretary General.

Ferroul ran again in the general elections of 24 April 1910 for the second constituency of Narbonne and was narrowly defeated by Albert Sarraut. He was again defeated by Sarraut in the 26 April 1914 elections. He did not run in the elections of 1919.

Ferroul died in Narbonne, Aude, on 29 December 1921.

== Sources ==
- Bon, Nicolas (24 July 2023), "Midi 1907, l'histoire d'une révolte vigneronne", vin-terre-net.com (in French)
- Clavel, Jean (24 May 2006b), Juin 1907 : Actions, sang et larmes (in French), archived from the original on 9 November 2012
- Derfler, Leslie (2009-06-30), Paul Lafargue and the Flowering of French Socialism, 1882–1911, Harvard University Press, ISBN 978-0-674-03422-8
- Ernest Ferroul (in French), Assemblée nationale
- Ernest Ferroul (1853–1921) (in French), BnF: Bibliothèque nationale de France
- Ferré, Georges (March 2007), "Le Midi viticole, rouge de colère", historia.fr (in French)
- Gavignaud-Fontaine, Geneviève (2007), "1907 : quand les gueux sauvèrent le vin", Lepoint.fr (in French)
- Goldberg, Harvey (1962), The Life of Jean Jaurès, Univ of Wisconsin Press, ISBN 978-0-299-02564-9
- Histoire du Roussillon : Crise viticole de 1907, un évènement marquant du XXe siècle (in French)
- Jolly, Jean, ed. (1960–1977), "Ferroul, Ernest", Dictionnaire des parlementaires français; notices biographiques sur les ministres, députés et sénateurs français de 1889 à 1940 (in French), Paris: Presses universitaires de France, ISBN 2-1100-1998-0
- Robert, Adolphe; Cougny, Gaston (1889–1891), "FERROUL (ERNEST)", in Edgar Bourloton (ed.), Dictionnaire des Parlementaires français (1789–1889) (in French)
- Steenson, Gary P. (1991-06-15), After Marx, Before Lenin: Marxism and Socialist Working-Class Parties in Europe, 1884–1914, University of Pittsburgh Pre, ISBN 978-0-8229-7673-8
