= Marcelin Albert =

French cafe owner and winegrower

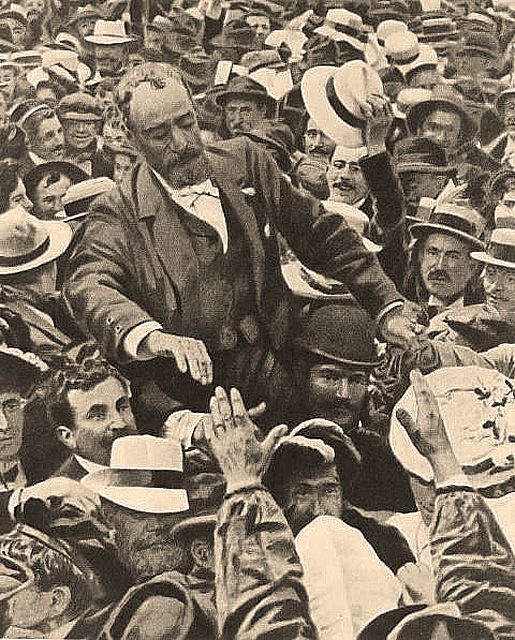
- Marcelin Albert carried in triumph in Montpellier, 9 June 1907
- Born: 29 March 1851; Argeliers, Aude, France
- Died: 21 December 1921 (aged 70); Argeliers, Aude, France
- Occupations: Cafe owner, winegrower

Marcelin Albert (29 March 1851 – 21 December 1921) was a French cafe owner and winegrower considered the leader of the 1907 revolt of the Languedoc winegrowers.

== Early years ==
Marcelin Albert was born on 29 March 1851 in Argeliers, Aude. The village is a few miles north of Narbonne. He seems to have been a simple man but a powerful orator. Albert owned a café and was a small-scale winegrower. Albert was a moderate republican, as were his fellow villagers, none of whom joined the strikes of 1904. One historian described Albert as follows: "A small peasant from Argeliers, who looked like a Spanish Christ, Marcelin Albert was a jack of all trades: director of a theatrical troupe, a café owner and a winemaker. In his village he was called "lo Cigal" (the Cicada), because of his whimsical and carefree spirit.

In 1900 Albert began fighting for the defense of natural wine against fake wine." In 1902, 1903 and 1905 Albert travelled around the villages of region talking to small groups of vinegrowers and workers and trying, without much success, to convince them to set aside their differences and form committees to demand help from the government. Albert avoided politics, but spoke out for the rights of honourable, hard-working people who had been exploited by defrauders, merchants and the government.

During a slump in wine prices, in 1905 a demonstration of 15,000 people was staged in Béziers. Albert then launched his "petition of 1905", which collected four hundred signatures. It read, "The undersigned have decided to pursue their just claims to the end, to go on strike against the tax, to demand the resignation of all the elected bodies and commit all the communes of the south and Algeria to follow their example with shouts of 'Long live natural wine! Down with the poisoners!'". On 18 February 1907 Albert sent a telegram to Prime Minister Georges Clemenceau in which he spelled out the suffering in the Midi due to the slump.

== Winegrower's revolt ==
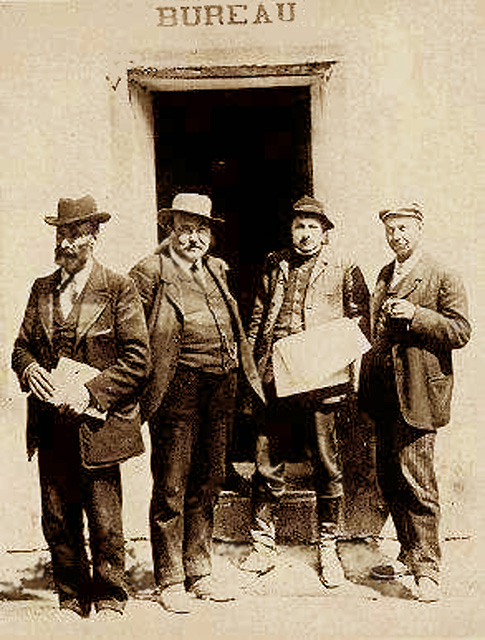
Some of the Argeliers Committee: Marcelin Albert, Elie Cathala, Louis Blanc and the doctor Senty

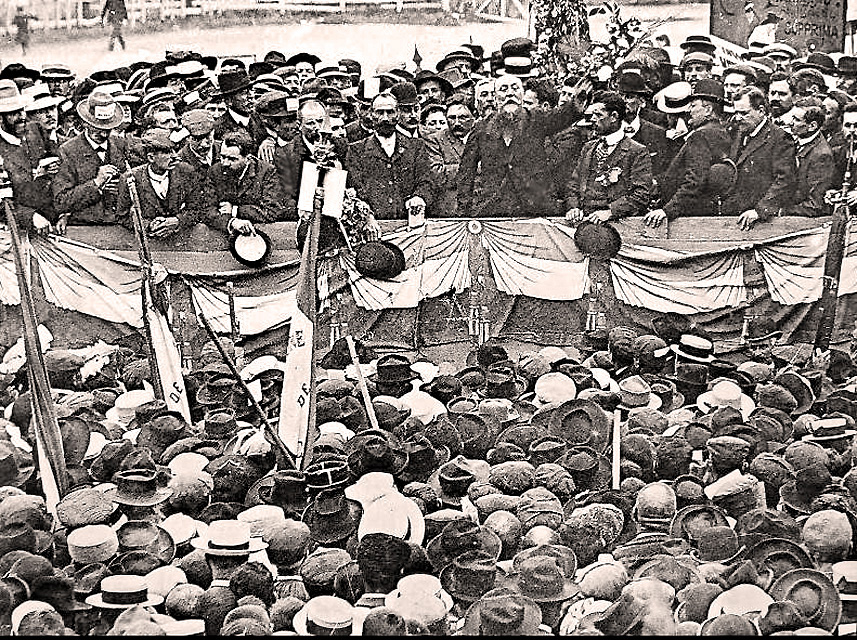
Meeting of winemakers addressed by Ernest Ferroul, Mayor of Narbonne, and Albert

On 11 March 1907 the signal for the revolt was given by a group of Minervois vine growers in Argeliers. They were led by Albert and Elie Bernard, who founded the Comité de defense viticole (Committee of Viticulture Defense), known as the Comité d'Argeliers (Argeliers Committee). The Committee was composed of President Marcelin Albert, Vice-President Édouard Bourges and Secretaries Cathala, Richard and Bernard. They organized a march to Narbonne of 87 vine growers for an interview with a parliamentary commission.

The parliamentary committee to review the situation arrived in Narbonne on 11 March and received a delegation led by Albert. The outcome was not satisfactory. After their testimony the winegrowers' committee made a tour of the city, for the first time singing La Vigneronne, which from that day became the anthem of the revolt of the paupers. Albert considered the one and only worthwhile fight was for natural wines. He refused to engage in the debate on the divergent interests of the workers and the owners, did not question the presence of royalists who openly wanted to claim the movement, and did not appreciate that on the pretext that the Occitan language is the mother tongue of the Midi wine growers, the regionalists want to make the fight into a separatist movement.

On 24 March the first meeting organized by the Committee of Argeliers was held in front of 300 people in Sallèles-d'Aude. Marcelin Albert stood out for his gifts as an orator and his charisma. During the revolt he was often called "the messiah" or "the redeemer". It was agreed to hold a meeting every Sunday in a different city. On 21 April the first issue of Le Tocsin was published by the Argeliers Committee. It was a weekly directed by Marcelin Albert and written by Louis Blanc. The first issue contained a request to parliament to pass a law against wine fraud. Albert remained vague about what he wanted done. In his view it was up to the government to solve the crisis.

On 12 May 1907 these were 150,000 demonstrators at the Béziers rally. Jean Jaurès spoke and then Albert launched an ultimatum to the government asking it to raise the price of wine. Ernest Ferroul set this ultimatum to expire on 10 June and advocated a tax strike if the government had not acted by then. On 26 May from 220,000 to 250,000 people demonstrated in Carcassonne. Marcelin Albert said, "The Albigenses were once gathered under these walls, they fell there in defense of their freedom. We will do like them! Forward for the defense of our rights! The Midi wants it, the Midi will have it!" On 9 June 1907 there was a gigantic gathering in Montpellier. The Place de la Comédie was invaded by a crowd estimated to number from 600,000 to 800,000 people. Marcelin Albert delivered such a speech that the journalist for Le Figaro wrote, "It was mad, sublime, terrifying".

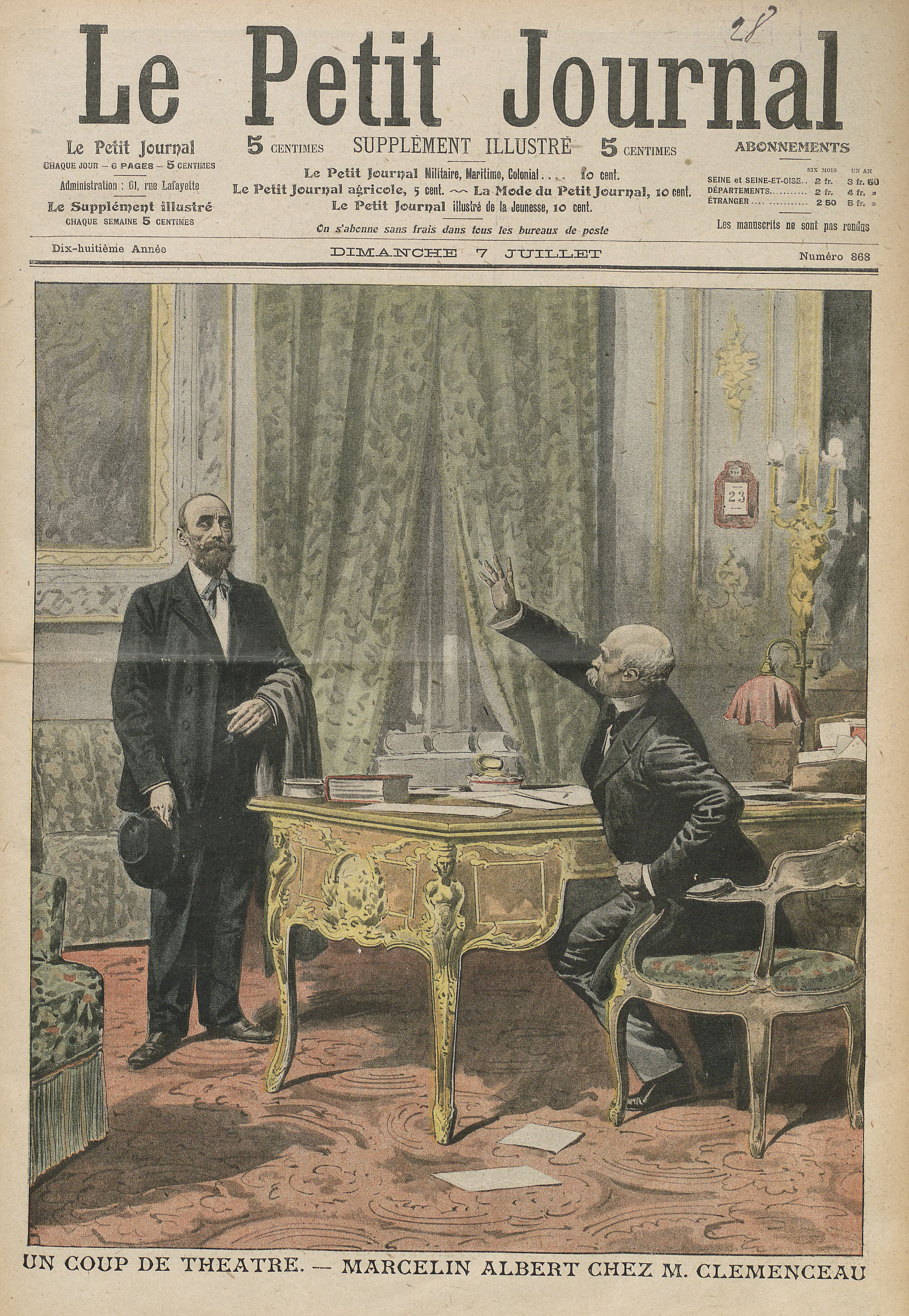
Marcelin Albert and Clemenceau, front page of Le Petit Journal, 7 July 1907

On 19 June Ernest Ferroul was arrested at dawn at his home in Narbonne by troops of the 139th Infantry Regiment and imprisoned in Montpellier. News of the planned arrest of all members of the Committee of Argeliers caused an explosion. Marcelin Albert, who had not been arrested, was hidden in the belfry of Argeliers. Chased by the police, Marcelin Albert fled to Paris where he arrived on 22 June 1907. The National Assembly, in full debate over the bill against fraud, refused to receive him. Georges Clemenceau heard of his presence and agreed to grant him a hearing. The premier received him in his role of Minister of the Interior at Place Beauvau. During their interview he promised to repress fraud if, in return, Albert returned to Languedoc to calm the rebellion, and even agreed to be a prisoner. Clemenceau signed a safe-conduct for his return to the Aude and gave him one hundred francs to pay for his return by train. Albert was naive enough to accept it.

Clemenceau took the opportunity to give his version to the political journalists and stressed the history of the payment. The national dailies took this up and Albert's status changed from redeemer to sell-out. On 24 June Albert was back in Narbonne. He met the members of the new defense committee and tried to convince them to suspend the movement. However, the interview with Clemenceau had totally discredited him in their eyes. On 26 June Albert went to Montpellier to become a prisoner.

== Last years ==
Albert spent over a month in prison for his own safety, and was almost lynched when he was released. He spent the rest of his life in obscurity. No longer wanted in the Aude, Albert moved to Algeria. There the winemakers clubbed together to support someone who had defended their profession, but Albert died in poverty. Albert died in his home village of Argelliers on 12 December 1921. In 1948 Louis Blanc published a pamphlet on the 1907 revolt. He wrote of Albert,

He seemed to soar, this Don Quixote in a Cronstadt Cap, with his black beard and gaunt face; he seemed to encircle all the earth in a large embrace, all the plains and all the garrigues in one protective gesture. He soared above immense crowds, as innumerable as the roots in the infinite rows of our vines; he soared above events that he ministered from on high, on a romantic pedestal that gave him the air of John the Baptist; he soared higher than could be reached by primitive consciousness. He soared, this figurehead of legend, and illuminated that most prosaic and material of stories: the misery of the working man. And the windmills of our mundane and mechanized age are equally formidable phantoms as those against which railed the knight of the sorrowful countenance. They are the anonymous forces of the economy.

Today many plaques commemorate Albert and many public squares and municipal buildings are named after him.

== Publications ==
- Castéran, Augustin; Albert, Marcelin (1911), Mémoires de Marcelin Albert; et Marcelin Albert et l'Algérie, Paris: Librairie universelle, p. 214

== Sources ==
- Bon, Nicolas (24 July 2023), "Midi 1907, l'histoire d'une révolte vigneronne", vin-terre-net.com (in French)
- Clavel, Jean (24 May 2006), Juin 1907 : Actions, sang et larmes (in French), archived from the original on 9 November 2012
- Ferré, Georges (1997), 1907, La guerre du vin. Chronique d'une désobéissance civique dans le midi (in French), Éditions Loubatières
- Ferré, Georges (March 2007), "Le Midi viticole, rouge de colère", historia.fr (in French)
- George, Rosemary (2003-05-15), The Wines of the South of France, Octopus, ISBN 978-1-84533-626-4
- Le Roy Ladurie, Emmanuel (May 2007), "1907, le millésime de la colère", L'Histoire (in French) (320)
- Loubère, Leo A. (1978), The Red and the White: The History of Wine in France and Italy in the Nineteenth Century, SUNY Press, ISBN 978-1-4384-1131-6
- Marcelin Albert (1851-1921) (in French), BnF: Bibliotheque nationale de France
- Pouget, Richard, Evènements Viticoles de 1907 (in French)
- Smith, Andrew (2016-09-19), Terror and terroir: The winegrowers of the Languedoc and modern France, Manchester University Press, ISBN 978-1-5261-0111-2
- Smith, J. Harvey (May 1978), "Agricultural Workers and the French Wine-Growers' Revolt of 1907", Past & Present, 79 (79), Oxford University Press on behalf of The Past and Present Society: 101–125, doi:10.1093/past/79.1.101, JSTOR 650250
- Sommières, La crise viticole de 1907 (in French)
- Tenaguillo y Cortázar, Amancio, Le vin sur la scène de l'histoire. 1907 : La révolte des vignerons dans le Midi (in French)
- Trinquier, Bruno, Marcelin Albert, le meneur (in French), archived from the original on 2009-09-25
- Vickers, Marques (2014-08-29), Amour, Wine and Real Estate in Southern France, Createspace Independent Pub, ISBN 978-1-5004-9353-0
- Zola, Emile, "La révolte des vignerons de 1907", emilezola.fr (in French), archived from the original on 2009-01-03
