= Palace of the Archbishops of Narbonne =

Town hall in Narbonne, France

The Palace of the Archbishops of Narbonne
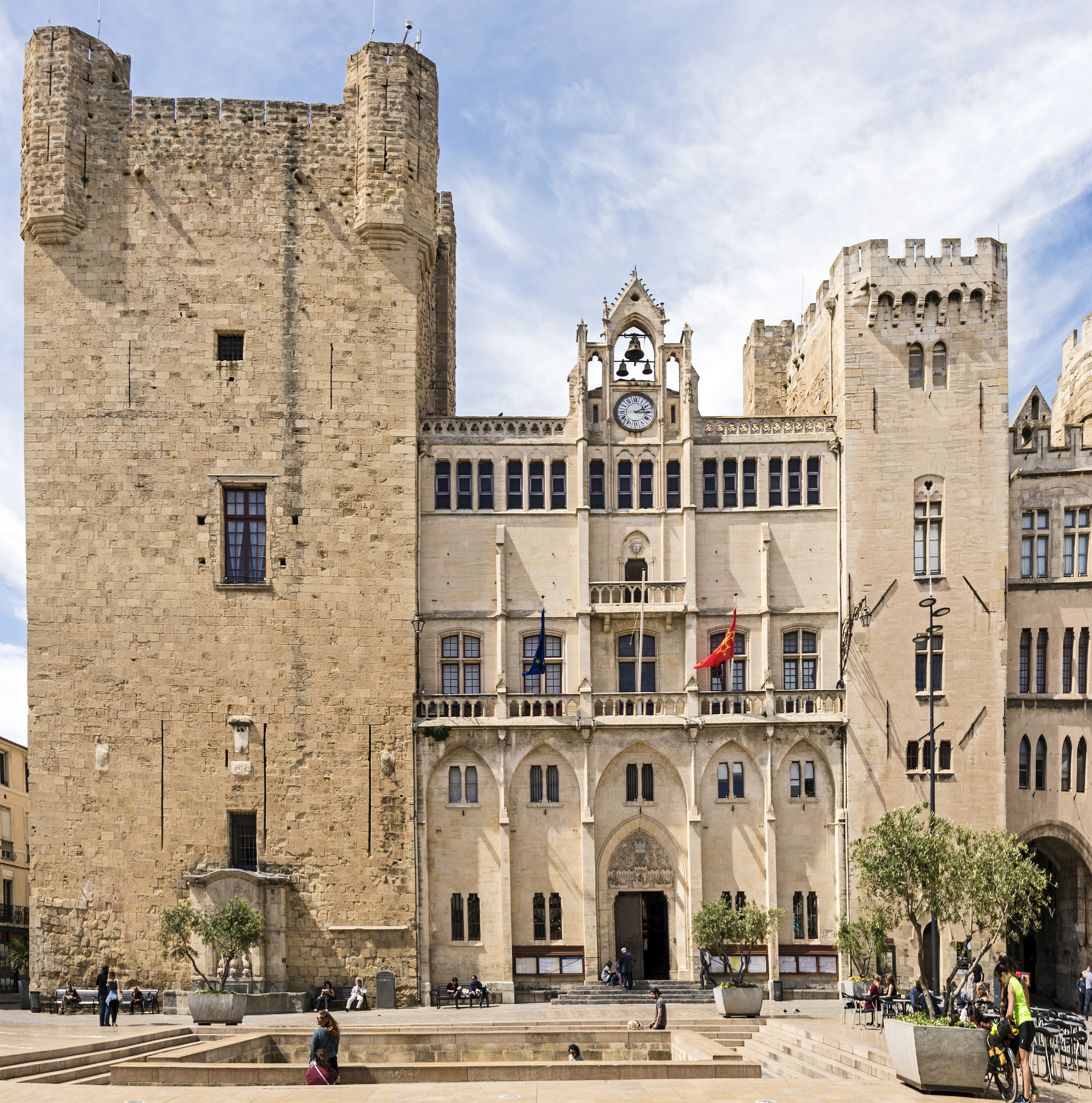
- The main frontage of the palace in April 2017

General information
- Type: City hall
- Architectural style: Neoclassical style
- Location: Narbonne, France
- Coordinates: 43.1839°N 3.0040°E
- Completed: 1852

Height
- Height: 42 metres (138 ft)

Design and construction
- Architect: Eugène Viollet-le-Duc

Monument historique
- Official name: Ancien archevêché et ses abords
- Type: Inscrit
- Designated: 1840
- Reference no.: PA00102789

The Palace of the Archbishops of Narbonne, or Palais des Archevêques de Narbonne, is a municipal building in Narbonne, Aude, southern France, standing on Place d'Hôtel de Ville. The building which serves as the Hôtel de Ville (town hall) of Narbonne, was designated a monument historique by the French government in 1840.

== History ==
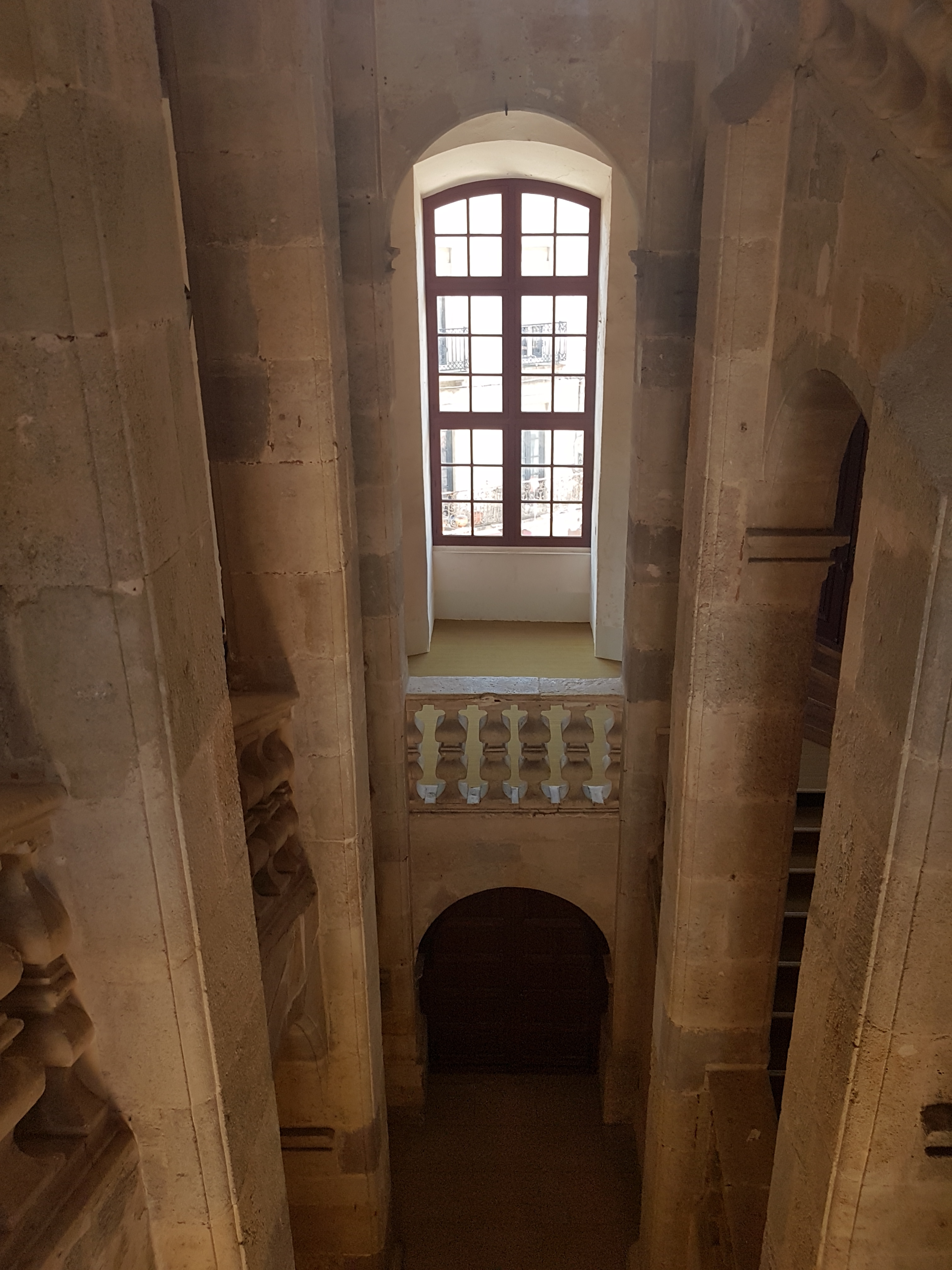
The Grand Staircase

The palace was originally intended to provide residential accommodation for the Archbishops of Nabonne and was erected to the southwest of Narbonne Cathedral. The Palais Neuf (New Palace), furthest to the southwest, was separated by the Passage de l'Ancre from the Palais Vieux (Old Palace), closer to the cathedral. Parts of the Palais Vieux (Old Palace) date back to the 12th century.

The design of the complex involved an asymmetrical main frontage facing onto Place aux Herbes (now Place d'Hotel de Ville). On the left of the main frontage is the 42 metres (138 ft) high Donjon Gilles Aycelin (Gilles Aycelin Keep), which was commissioned by Bishop Gilles I Aycelin de Montaigu in 1308. The other components, from left to right, were a castellated section with five tall arches, the Tour Saint-Martial (Saint Martial Tower) of 1347, a section with a carriageway arch through it, leading to the Passage de l'Ancre, and on the right, the Tour de la Madeleine (Magdeleine Tower), which also dated from the 14th century.

In November 1789, during the French Revolution, the complex was seized by the state and, in 1831, it was taken over by the Ministry of War for use as military barracks. Concerned to preserve the heritage associated with the site, in May 1842, the town council acquired the complex with the intention of converting it for use as a town hall. The conversion work was carried out to a design by Eugène Viollet-le-Duc and involved demolishing the castellated section with five tall arches, and replacing it with a more elaborate section with an arched doorway in the central tall arch. The new section was fenestrated with bipartite windows in the other bays on the ground floor as well as the first floor, a wide balustraded balcony and five segmental headed windows on the second floor, a narrow balustraded balcony and a single French doorway on the third floor and a series of lancet windows on the fourth floor. The new structure was surmounted by a clock and a bell tower. Internally, the conversion created a Salle du Conseil (council chamber), a series of committee rooms and some museum space. The complex was officially re-opened on 29 November 1852.

On 10 June 1907, during the revolt of the Languedoc winegrowers, the mayor of Narbonne, Ernest Ferroul, stood on the balcony of the town hall, announced his resignation as mayor, and advocated a campaign of civil disobedience until the government agreed to increase the price of wine.

After the Second World War, the Palais Vieux (Old Palace), which had served as a prison in the 19th century and as a school in the first half of the 20th century, was fitted out to accommodate the archaeological exhibits of the Musée Archéologique, while items of local history were placed on display in the Musée d'Art et d'Histoire in the Palais Neuf (New Palace). (Note: The Musée d'Art et d'Histoire was established as an initiative by Paul Tournal in 1833.)
