= Maraussan =

- Commune
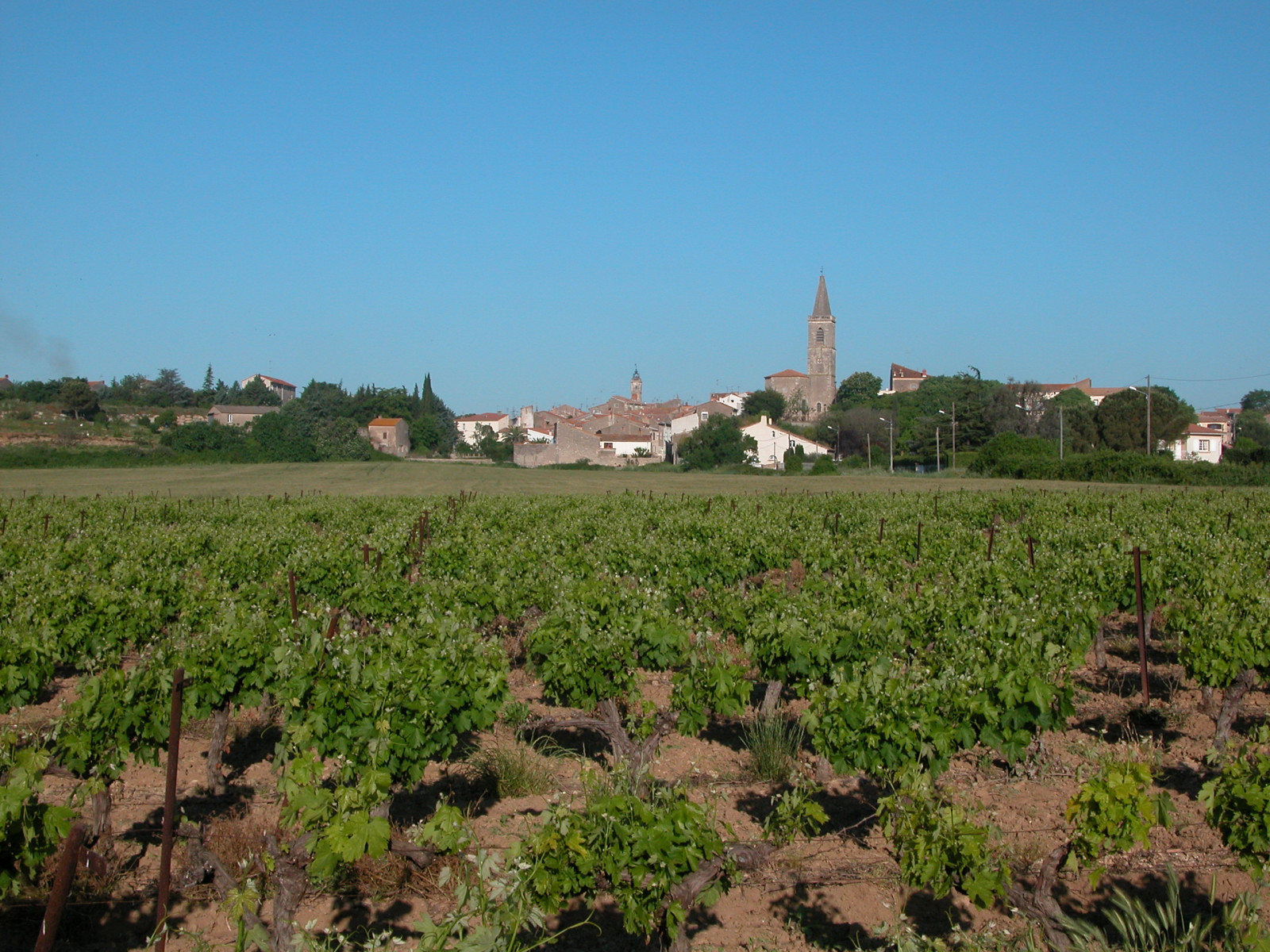
- A view of old Maraussan

- Coat of arms
- Location of Maraussan
- Location within France Location within Occitanie
- Coordinates: 43°22′03″N 3°09′31″E
- Country: France
- Region: Occitania
- Department: Hérault
- Arrondissement: Béziers
- Canton: Cazouls-lès-Béziers
- Intercommunality: Domitienne

Government
  - Mayor (2024–2026): Marlène Puche
- Area^{1}: 12.37 km^{2} (4.78 sq mi)
- Elevation: 38 m (125 ft)
- Highest elevation: 92 m (302 ft)
- Lowest elevation: 8 m (26 ft)
- Population (2023): 4,789
  - Density: 387.1/km^{2} (1,003/sq mi)
- Time zone: UTC+01:00 (CET)
  - Summer (DST): UTC+02:00 (CEST)
- INSEE/Postal code: 34148 /34370
- ^{1} French Land Register data, which excludes lakes, ponds, glaciers > 1 km^{2} (0.386 sq mi or 247 acres) and river estuaries.

Maraussan (French pronunciation: [maʁosɑ̃]; Occitan: Marauçan) is a commune in the Hérault department in southern France.

It lies approximately 8 km northwest of Béziers, on route D14 ( Av de Béziers ), a busy route for commuters to Béziers.

Chateau Perdiguier lies just outside the town on the cross road D39 (Route de Tarbaka) leading down to the river Orb.

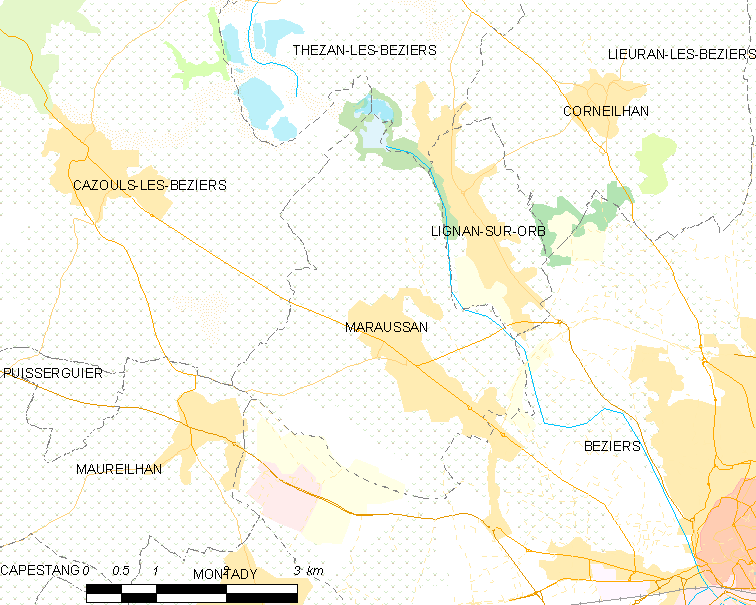
Map

== History ==
- 1230: Construction of the current church by the Bishop of Béziers who settled in Villenouvette.
- 1375: Jean de Perdiguier had the "Château de Perdiguier" built, enlarging the bastide "En Auger".
- 1626: Construction of the consular house (former town hall).
- 1820: Muscat production is 7,000 hl. During these years, it is the flagship production which, through its quality, makes the reputation of the village.
- 1872: Opening of the boys' school, now the Plan Jules Ferry nursery school.
- 1877: Opening of the girls' school.
- 1891: Maraussan is connected to the railway network by the Hérault Railways and sees the construction of the Tabarka bridge and the station located on the site of the current post office.
- 1901: As the 1907 winegrowers' revolt loomed, a few small winegrowers banded together and founded Les Vignerons Libres (The Free Winegrowers) in a shed located on Avenue de Cazouls. Their goal was to vinify and sell wine collectively at the best price, freeing themselves from the wine merchants.
- On May 1, 1905, Jean Jaurès visited the cooperative winery under construction. His speech was published in L'Humanité on May 7, 1905.
- From 1942 to 1944, the Germans occupied the village. The requisitioned schools served as barracks. The "Groupe Arnal" was formed and participated in the liberation of Béziers.
- After the war, the village was connected to the electricity grid.
- In 1969, the cobbled streets were torn up to install the sewer system.
- In the 1970s, the first housing development, "Le Flank des Coteaux" (The Hillside), was built. The locals of Maraussan at the time nicknamed it "Casablanca" because of its flat roofs. Others followed. The village expanded inexorably. This trend continues today, at the expense of fertile farmland.
- Towards the end of the 20th century, declining wine consumption led to a drop in the number of winegrowers. The wine cooperative closed in 2001, and the village lost its rural character.

== Population ==
Historical population
Year	Pop.	±% p.a.
1968	1,655	—
1975	2,088	+3.38%
1982	2,154	+0.45%
1990	2,336	+1.02%
1999	2,782	+1.96%
2007	3,320	+2.23%
2012	3,976	+3.67%
2017	4,414	+2.11%
2023	4,789	+1.37%
Source: INSEE

== See also ==
- Communes of the Hérault department
