= Revolt of the Languedoc winegrowers =

1907 peasant revolt in southern France

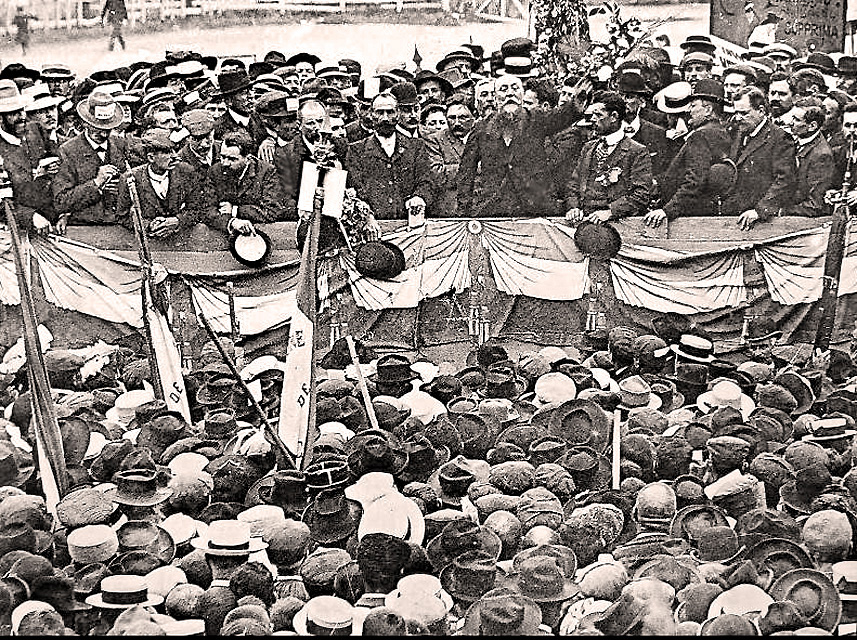
- Meeting of winemakers addressed by Ernest Ferroul, Mayor of Narbonne, and Marcelin Albert
- Native name: Révolte des vignerons du Languedoc
- Date: 11 March – 22 September 1907
- Location: Argelliers, Béziers, Minervois, Montpellier, and Narbonne in Southern France
- Also known as: Révolte des gueux du Midi
- Type: Peasant revolt, labor movement
- Cause: Falling wine prices, pests of grapevines, production and sell of adulterated wines
- Motive: Eliminate unfair competition
- Organised by: Marcelin Albert
- Outcome: Demands met by revised laws
- Deaths: 7 deaths (19–20 June 1907)

The Revolt of the Languedoc winegrowers was a peasant labor movement founded in 1907, primarily active in the Languedoc and Pyrénées-Orientales regions of France, that was repressed by the government of Georges Clemenceau. It was caused by a crisis in winemaking at the start of the 20th century. The movement was also called the "paupers revolt" of the Midi. It was marked by the fraternization of the 17th-line infantry regiment with the demonstrators in Béziers.

== Languedoc vineyards before the 1907 crisis ==
=== Mass viticulture ===
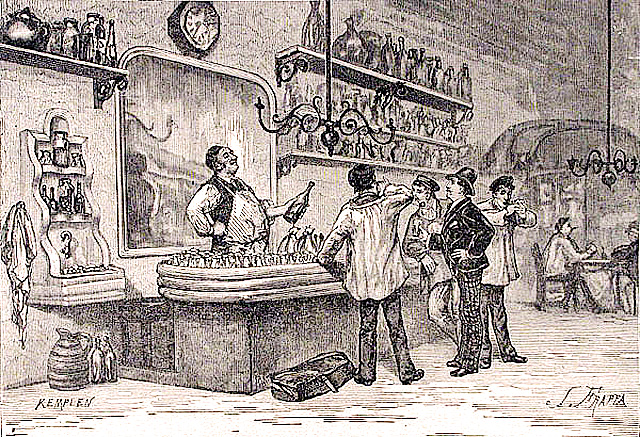
L'Assommoir of Père Colombe, 1906 edition of L'Assommoir by French writer Émile Zola, from the series Les Rougon-Macquart (1871–1893).

Winemaking in Languedoc and Pyrénées-Orientales developed in the 18th century with the construction of the port of Sète and completion of the Canal du Midi. Wine, for which the preservation techniques had been improved, could be transported to new markets. The vineyards were extended and on the eve of the French Revolution about half the land around Béziers was covered with vines.

In 1853 railway lines began to serve Languedoc, which opened new markets to regional viticulture, particularly in the north of the country and its industrial regions. The biggest consumers were the workers, a large part of whose salary was devoted to the purchase of wine.

The French Third Republic facilitated the massive opening of drinking places by the law of 17 July 1880. They were mainly in the working-class districts of large cities, with an average of three outlets for five buildings. As a result, the consumption of wine and other alcoholic beverages skyrocketed. The beverages sold in these places under the name of wine were extremely poor quality and were often not wine at all. The damage was such that in the 1890s an anti-alcoholic, syndicalist, and socialist labor movement was born.

=== A catastrophic half-century ===
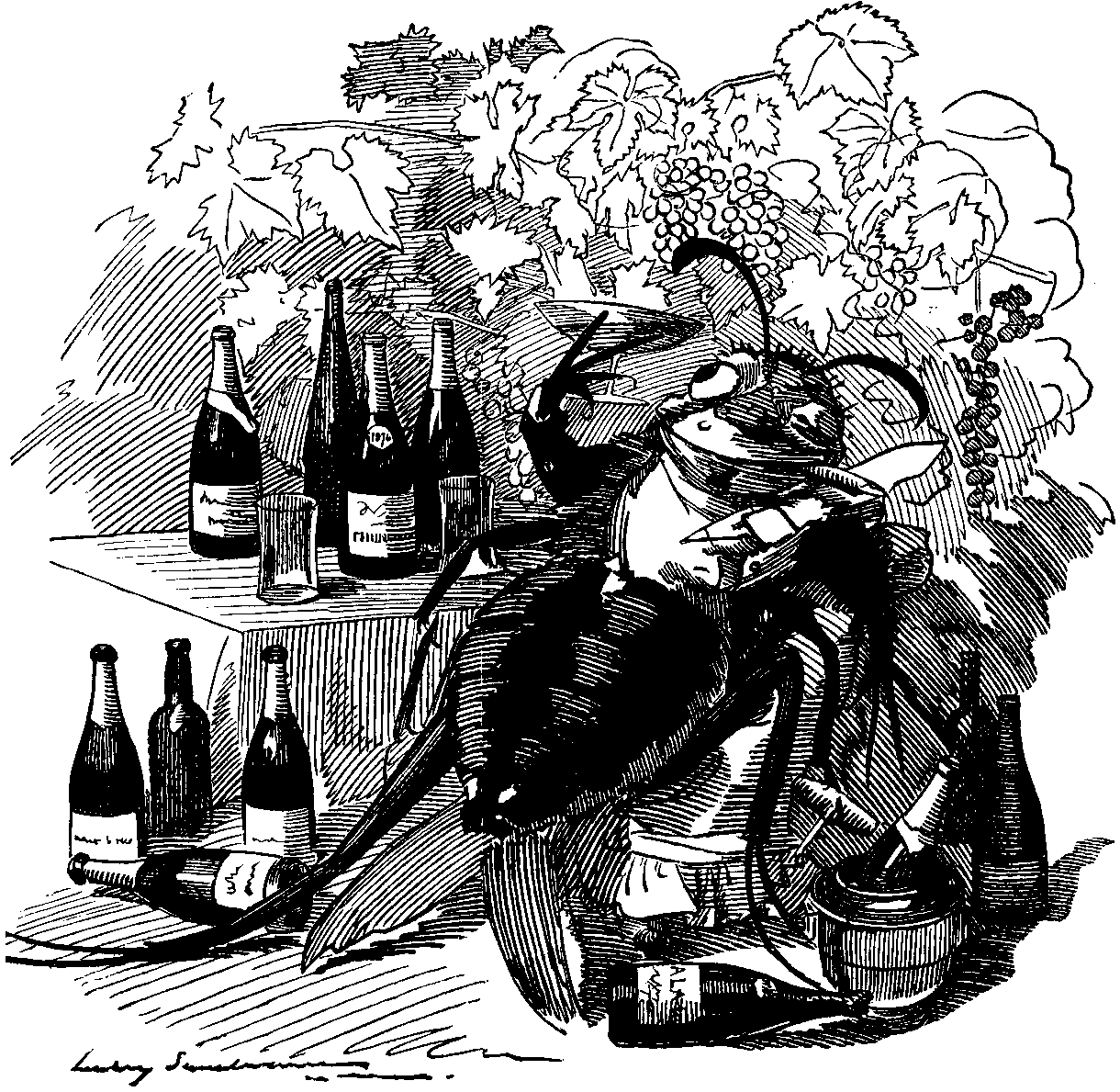
Late 19th-century illustration and perspective on the winemaking crisis in France, depicting a phylloxera drunk on French wine. Caricature by Edward Linley Sambourne from Punch magazine (September 6th, 1890, page 110).

In 1856 the Moniteur vinicole, the press organ of the Parisian wine merchants Entrepôts de Bercy, published a "Classification of viticulture departments in order of importance relative to the extent of the vineyards and the quality of the products". Except for Bordeaux, Burgundy, and Champagne, ignorance was total. Almost all the wines of France were ignored by the Parisian trade and the large drinking places. To mitigate this lack of knowledge, Achille Larive, director of the newspaper, launches a "call to owners of unknown wines". On 10 September 1856 he published the results of his inquiry. In the next issue a reader pointed out that the wines of small proprietors were ignored.

In the second half of the 19th century, French viticulture also faced several crises due to pests of grapevines: the fungus powdery mildew, which spread around 1850 by attacking the leaves of the vine and the fruit; then the phylloxera infestation in 1863, an insect that feeds on the roots and leaves of grapevines; and finally the downy mildew towards the end of the 19th century, another fungus that attaches to the back of the leaves. It produces oily layers on the leaf surface that cause them to fall early and weaken the vine. Thanks to Bordeaux mixture, a compound of Copper(II) sulfate and slaked lime, and the introduction of American plants used as rootstocks naturally resistant to phylloxera, the vines completely recovered.

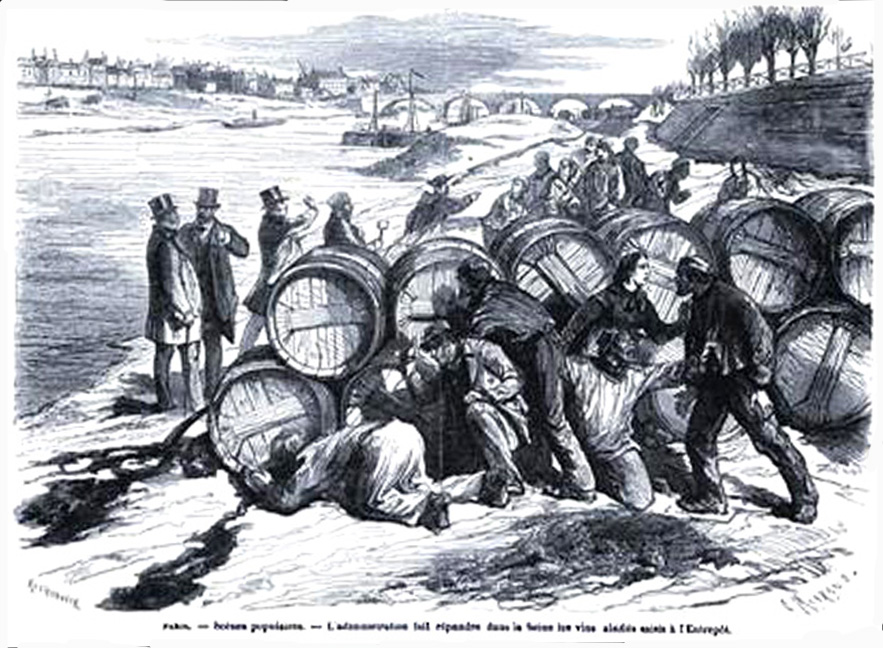
Illustration from Le Monde illustré (n° 674, 1870): the administration pours barrels of falsified wine seized in the Entrepôts de Paris into the Seine.

This did not end the manufacture of falsified wines. In an issue of Le Monde illustré (March 12th, 1870), an article by Leo de Bernard denounced the production and sell of adulterated wine: "petit bordeaux ... made in Bercy, where the tasting service always has its eye and nose open. The containers of this mixture, made of unknown ingredients, are confiscated and placed in a special cell. Their detention does not last long because there is no doubt of their guilt. On the day of execution, the condemned barrels are brought to the bank of the quai d'Austerlitz. A police commissioner ensures that prompt justice is done. When the signal is given the executioner of the high hygienic works opens the flanks of the victim, and from the deep wound a large black flow escapes into the Seine whose hue vaguely recalls logwood, litharge, and other harmful drugs."

While everywhere else, especially in the North-West, the area planted with vines was decreasing, it increased in the departments of Aude, Gard, Hérault, and Pyrénées-Orientales. These four provided 40% of French wine production, rising to almost 45% in the first half of the 20th century. Production in Haut Languedoc grew rapidly, particularly in the Biterrois and Béziers, self-proclaimed "World Capital of Wine". Great fortunes were made. Large landowners from industry, finance or the liberal professions had vast estates of several tens of hectares.

Tampered wines appeared on the market to cope with foreign competition. Exposed fraudsters were not punished. In 1892 the winemakers of the South demanded official suppression of sugaring and reestablishment of customs duties. But the market continued to be partly supplied by wines made from imported dried grapes, wines diluted with water, chaptalized wines and even "wines" made without grapes. However, although vintners gave great prominence to this unfair competition, it did not represent more than 5% of the market.

A demonstration was held in Montpelier on 12 December 1893 and a petition circulated that gathered thousands of signatures opposing fraud and falsified wines. The first calls for tax strikes were launched with the support of elected representatives who threatened to resign from their mandates. The radical government opposed them with the argument that the wine crisis was caused by overproduction of wine in the South.

=== Winemaking cooperation, symbol of the Red Midi ===
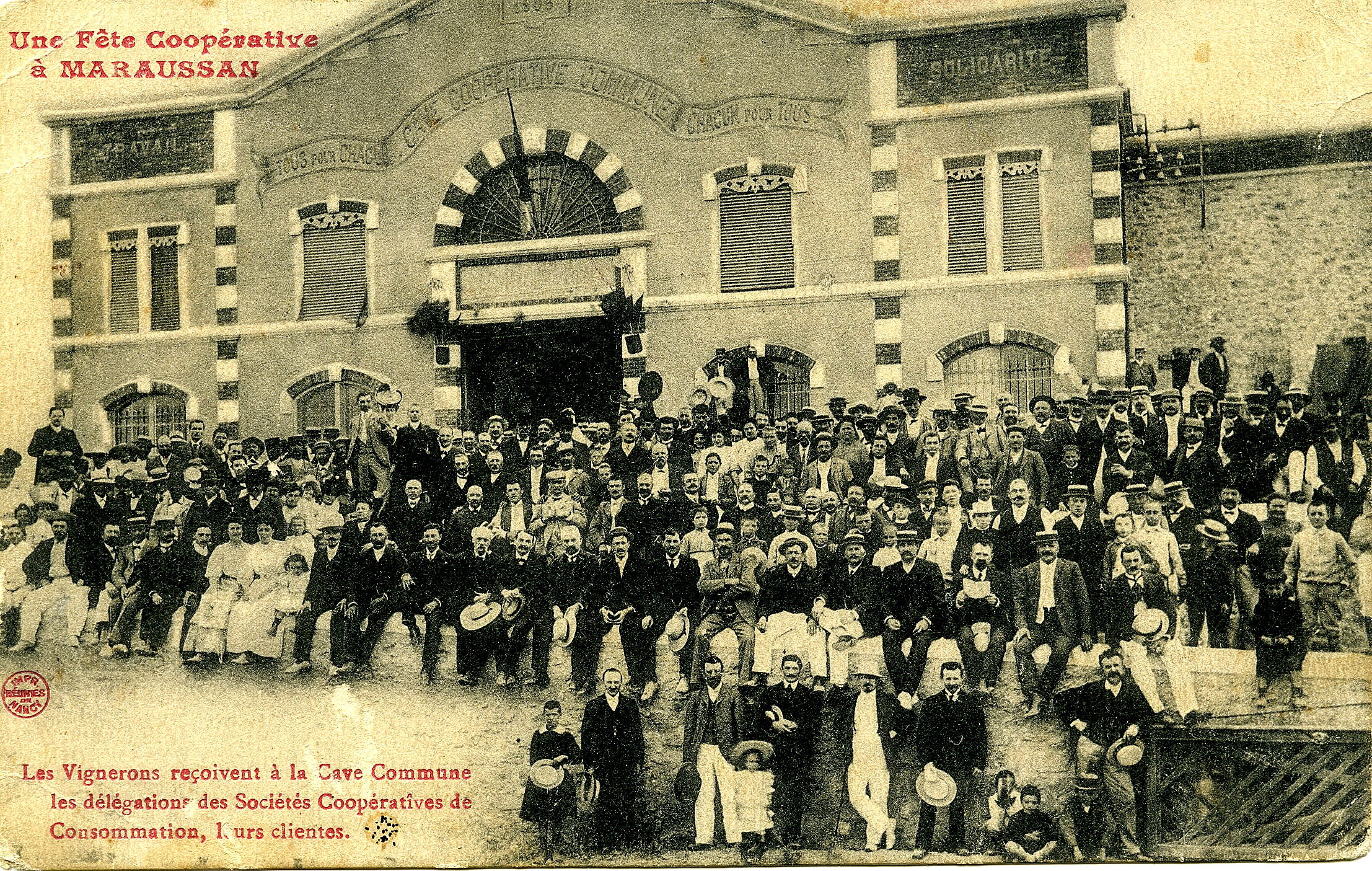
In Maraussan the winemakers receive the representatives of the consumer cooperatives, their customers, in front of the common cellar

At the start of the 20th century the idea of a winemakers union to improve sales of Hérault wines grew in some communes of the Biterrois. The first two to set up a cooperative to sell their wines without intermediaries were Maraussan and Mudaison in 1901. The Maraussan sales cooperative was created on 23 December 1901 by 128 winemakers. The initiative proved effective and was copied by Marseillan (1903), Siran (1907) and then Marsillargues and Frontignan (1910).

In 1905 the Maraussan cooperative was the first to set up a joint wine making operation by erecting a building for that purpose. Elie Cathala, a distiller who was used to distribution channels, and Maurice Blayac, president of the agricultural and mutual credit union, were instrumental in achieving this goal. The combination of control over grape production and wine making made it possible to offer a range of wines at diverse prices according to quality.

Jean Jaurès came to salute the initiative on the spot. On 1 May 1905, during his visit to the new buildings, the socialist leader explained that the peasants had to unite instead of refusing to help each other, using this allegory: "In a vineyard, contrary and mad grapes said that they did not want to go with their brothers who let themselves be picked. They did what they wanted, and what happened was that they rotted on stump, while the others went to the vat, where they made the good wine that rejoices hearts. Peasants, do not stay away. Put together your wishes, and, in the vat of the Republic, prepare the wine of the Social Revolution!".

A large majority of the small cooperating wine growers in Languedoc and Roussillon held socialist or even communist views (pooling of production tools and profits from sales, the basic principle of cooperative cellars), thus forming a Midi Rouge (Red South of France). The majority of elected local officials from rural towns or wine-growing areas were the political representatives of the Midi Rouge and in the beginning of 20th century adopted the Occitan slogan of Jaurès: Dins la tina de la Republica, preparatz lo vin de la Revolucion Sociala! ("In the vat of the Republic, prepare the wine of the Social Revolution!").

Construction of a building dedicated to wine making in Maraussan was decided by the general assembly of 19 February 1905. Its production capacity was 2,000,000 liters and it had 29 cement tanks of 50,000 liters each for vinification and storage. The Free Winemakers of Maraussan became the symbol of wine cooperation and the hope it had aroused. The facade of the cellar was always adorned with the motto "All for everyone, everyone for all". It was inscribed on the list of historical monuments by decree of 25 May 2001.

=== Overproduction crisis ===
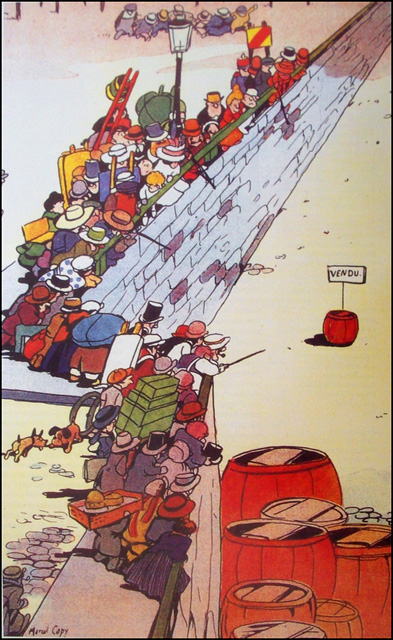
Drawing by Marcel Capy: Latest news, we just sold half a barrel of wine in the south!

Algerian wine and foreign competition made the overproduction crisis worse, since Spain and Italy also had surplus wine to sell. Harvests were poor in 1902 and 1903 due to bad weather, and France produced 3,500 to 4,000 million liters. The prices of wine in these years were 16 francs, then 24 francs per hundred litres. In this context in 1903 the government allowed chaptalization of imported wines.

In 1904 and 1905, again because of the weather, harvests were abundant throughout continental Europe. The increase in production in the three main European producers was 96% in France, 48% in Spain, and 16% in Italy. The threshold for a price collapse was 5,000 million liters, and production was 6,900 million. From 1900 to 1906 the viticulture of Languedoc produced from 1,600 to 2,100 million liters. Total French production remained at a high level in the following years: 5,800 million liters in 1905, 5,200 in 1906 and 6,600 in 1907. The price of 100 litres of wine dropped to 6 or 7 francs.

Languedoc wine sales deteriorated steadily. Abundant harvests inflated stocks that were impossible to sell. Some drinking places even sold wine "by time": the customer paid a fixed price and then drank all the wine they wanted ... or that they could drink.

The wine growers reacted to the slump. A regional committee was formed for defense of the wine-growing interests of the Midi on 20 January 1905. French politicians Gaston Doumergue, deputy of Gard, and Félix Aldy, deputy of the Aude, could not make their colleagues in the Parliament to take the viticultural issue seriously, and their proposals for the defense of natural wine (in this context, meaning wine made from fresh grapes and without adulteration) were rejected by the other parliamentarians.

In 1905 a demonstration of 15,000 people was staged in Béziers. A certain Marcelin Albert then launched his "petition of 1905", which collected four hundred signatures. It read, "The undersigned have decided to pursue their just claims to the end, to go on strike against the tax, to demand the resignation of all the elected bodies and commit all the communes of the south and Algeria to follow their example with shouts of 'Long live natural wine! Down with the poisoners!'".

== The events of 1907 ==
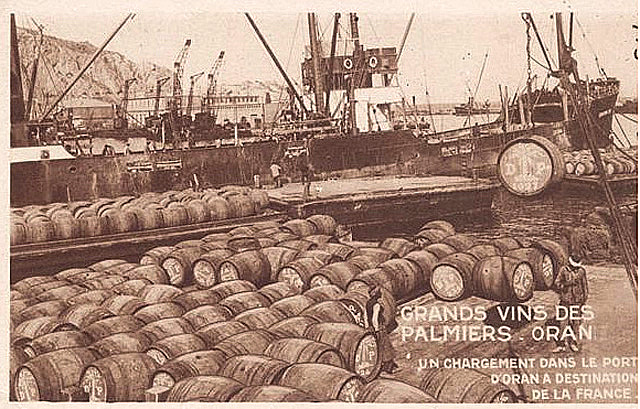
Wine being loaded in the port of Oran for shipment to France

There was a crisis in 1907. The winemakers of Languedoc felt themselves increasingly threatened by wines imported from Algeria through the port of Sète and by chaptalization (adding sugar before fermentation to increase alcohol content). The country had not experienced such misery since the outbreak of phylloxera. The crisis had been building for three years. Winemakers could not sell their product, people were unemployed and there was general distress.

Wine was still needed after the phylloxera crisis. The vineyards of the Île-de-France had disappeared but southern vineyards could replace them thanks to the railways. There was no hesitation over adulterating the wine. The state favored importing Algerian wines, which were mixed with poor quality wines of metropolitan France. This practice created a glut of wine that caused the slump in the Languedoc-Roussillon viticulture. Apart from its role as a distribution center, the port of Sète acted as a catalyst for the crisis. Its presence at the center of a large production area created the risk of overproduction by encouraging use of aramon grapes and large vineyards. This created volume. The need to cut these wines to increase strength caused increased demand for Algerian wines, whose production rose from 500,000,000 liters in 1900 to 800,000,000 in 1904.

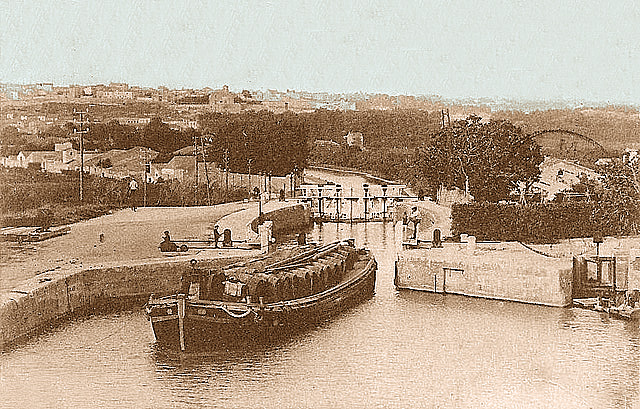
Transport of wine by barge on the Canal du Midi to the locks of Béziers

Strong local production together with the production of fake wines and blends with Algerian wines saturated the consumer market. Wine imports, far from diminishing, increased in 1907, aggravating the imbalance between supply and demand. This caused the fall of prices and the economic crisis.

As early as January 1907 a warning was given by a report published by the Revue de la Societe des Viticulteurs de France: "The sweetening of grape harvests was authorized by law only in view of chaptalization, that is to say, as a means of improving the quality of the wine, and not as a method of increasing its quantity by means of dilution. It is therefore legitimate to establish a proportional tax on the natural product thus enhanced. The wine associations and oenology committee have long recommended that all regulation of sugaring the grape harvest should include a tax on the sugar used in the harvest".

The small wine growers were ruined and agricultural workers were unemployed. There was a domino effect on the whole population, since the ruin of the winemakers entails that of shopkeepers and other trades. There was misery throughout the region, and the 1906 harvest did not sell.

In February 1907 a tax strike began in Baixas. Joseph Tarrius, winemaker and pharmacist, circulated a petition to be signed by his fellow citizens entitled: "The municipality of Baixas, unable to pay the tax, is under mass expropriation. It is a tax we can pay and pay again: The tax on blood."

On 18 February 1907 Marcelin Albert took the initiative to send a telegram to Georges Clemenceau. One historian described Albert as follows: "A small peasant from Argeliers, who looked like a Spanish Christ, Marcelin Albert was a jack of all trades: director of a theatrical troupe, a café owner and a winemaker. In his village he was called "lo Cigal" (the Cicada), because of his whimsical and carefree spirit. Since 1900 he had been fighting for the defense of natural wine against fake wine. He was the initiator of the revolt of winemakers that started on 11 March 1907."

=== Argeliers Committee ===
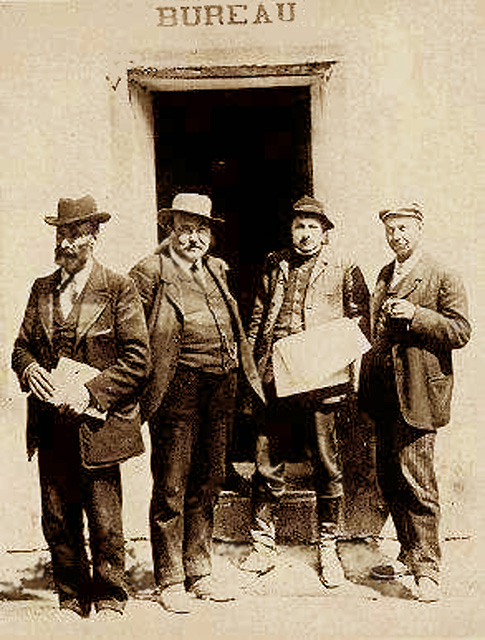
Some of the Argeliers Committee: Marcelin Albert, Elie Cathala, Louis Blanc and the doctor Senty

On 11 March 1907 the signal for the revolt was given by a group of Minervois vine growers in the village of Argeliers. They were led by Marcelin Albert and Elie Bernard, who founded the Comité de defense viticole (Committee of Viticulture Defense), known as the Comité d'Argeliers (Argeliers Committee). They organized a march to Narbonne of 87 vine growers for an interview with a parliamentary commission. After their testimony the committee made a tour of the city, for the first time singing La Vigneronne, which from that day became the anthem of the revolt of the paupers. The Committee was composed of President Marcelin Albert, Vice-President Édouard Bourges and Secretaries Cathala, Richard and Bernard.

Elie Bernard was later named Secretary General of the General Confederation of Midi Winegrowers^{(fr)}. The Argeliers committee, which included all the producers, prepared the response to the crisis. On 14 March 1907 Albert Sarraut, a native of Bordeaux, senator of Aude and under-secretary of state for the Interior, was ridiculed by Clemenceau for trying to plead the case of his electorate. Clemenceau, President of the Council and Minister of the Interior, told Sarraut, "I know the South, it will all end with a banquet".

In this region, where the Socialists had a strong presence, no well-known elected representative joined the Committee at the beginning. This allowed Marcellin Albert to present only corporatist claims. The one and only fight he considered worthwhile was for natural wines. He refused to engage in the debate on the divergent interests of the workers and the owners, did not question the presence of royalists who openly wanted to claim the movement, and did not appreciate that on the pretext that the Occitan language is the mother tongue of the Midi wine growers, the regionalists want to make the fight into a separatist movement.

On 24 March the first meeting organized by the Committee of Argeliers was held in front of 300 people in Sallèles-d'Aude. Marcelin Albert stood out for his gifts as an orator and his charisma. For the winegrowers present he became the apostle, the king of the paupers, the redeemer. It was agreed to hold a meeting every Sunday in a different city.

=== Major demonstrations ===
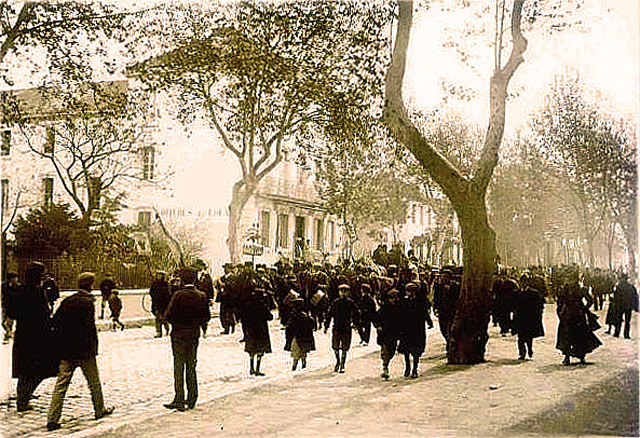
Demonstration in Lézignan-Corbières 28 April 1907

The movement gained momentum. Rallies were organized every Sunday. The events mobilized tens of thousands of people, and grew until 9 June 1907. On 31 March 1907 there were 500–600 protesters in Bize-Minervois. On 7 April there 1,000 people in Ouveillan. The meeting on 14 April mobilized more than 5,000 demonstrators in Coursan. On 21 April ten to fifteen thousand winegrowers met in Capestang. On this day the first issue of Le Tocsin was published by the Argeliers Committee. It as a weekly directed by Marcelin Albert and written by Louis Blanc. The first issue contained a request to parliament to pass a law against wine fraud. On 28 April the rally in Lézignan-Corbières brought together between 20,000 and 25,000 people.

In the month of May there were large gatherings in the prefectures and sub-prefectures of Languedoc-Roussillon. The first took place at Narbonne, where on 5 May a rally mobilized between 80,000 and 100,000 people. The mayor Ernest Ferroul took a stand for the struggle of the Midi winemakers and stigmatized the state. He told the crowd, "For a long time you have given credit to the state. The time has come where your debt is to be repaid". All the viticultural defense committees of the four departments federated and adopted the oath of the federations: "Constituted as a committee of public safety for the defense of viticulture, we all swear to unite for viticultural defense, which we will defend by all means. Anyone who, for reasons of interest, ambition or political will, would prejudice the original motion and thereby render us unable to win will be tried, convicted and executed on the spot". The separatist speeches in the Occitan language worried the government.

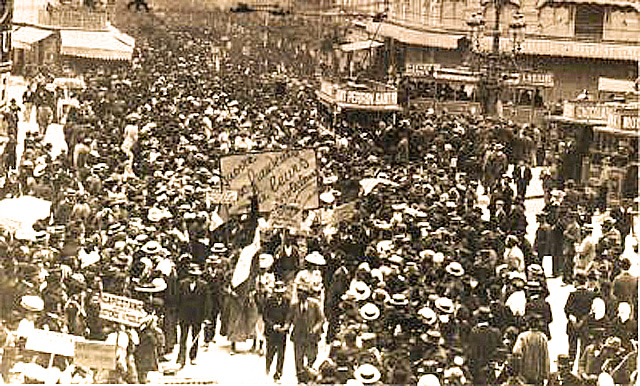
Protesters going up the Allées Paul Riquet 17 May 1907

On 12 May 1907 these were 150,000 demonstrators at the Béziers rally in the de the Allées Paul Riquet and the Champ-de-Mars. Slogans on the banners read in French or Occitan, "Victory or death!"; "Enough of speech, deeds"; "Death to fraudsters"; "Bread or death"; "Live working or die fighting"; "To have so much good wine and not be able to eat bread!". The demonstrators, who came from more than 200 communes, were joined by many employees and traders from Béziers. The event was closed by speeches on the Place de la Citadelle. Jean-Jaurès spoke and then Marcelin Albert launched an ultimatum to the government asking it to raise the price of wine. Ernest Ferroul set this ultimatum to expire on 10 June and advocated a tax strike, "If by June 10, the government has not found a solution to the crisis then there will be resignation of the town halls of the South! There will be a tax strike!". Emile Suchon, Mayor of Béziers and close to Clemenceau, supported the winemakers' fight. There were some slight incidents between the appeal and the dispersal of the demonstrators.

That day some demonstrators who could not reach Béziers for lack of a train built barricades on the railway track at the Marcorignan station and blocked all traffic. Four days later on 16 May 1907 some winemakers found out the position of the Mayor of Béziers, started a riot and forced him to resign. The sub-prefect, on the orders of Clemenceau, called for the army to restore order. The same day the City Council of Beziers, socialists with a radical tendency, resigned in turn. The street pressure continued. The police station and the facade of the Hôtel de Ville (town hall) were set on fire. On 19 May in Perpignan 170,000 to 200,000 people marched in the city. The demonstration took place without serious incidents.

Clemenceau counter-attacked at the political level. On 22 May his Minister of Finance Joseph Caillaux tabled a bill on wine fraud. The text submitted to Parliament provided for an annual declaration of their harvest by wine growers, prohibition of second-cycle sweetening and control and taxation of purchases of sugar.

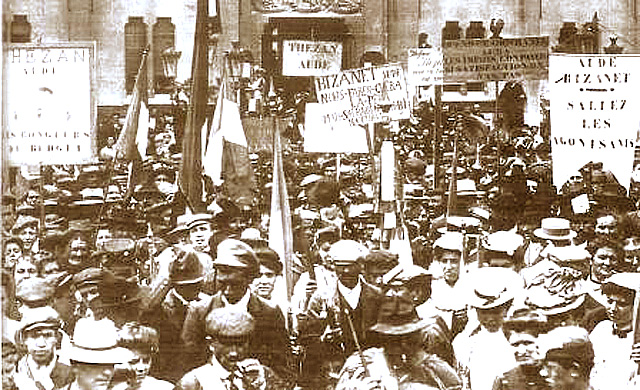
Protesters in Carcassonne 26 May

On 26 May from 220,000 to 250,000 people demonstrated in Carcassonne. From the station avenue they passed under a triumphal arch on which was written "Solute to our brothers in misery". The speeches to the gathering tried to channel the revolutionary tone of slogans and claims towards the Cathar past of the Occitans, which Ferroul and Albert evoked in turn. Marcelin Albert said, "The Albigenses were once gathered under these walls, they fell there in defense of their freedom. We will do like them! Forward for the defense of our rights! The Midi wants it, the Midi will have it!" Ernest Ferroul, a great speaker, played on the secular opposition between North and South, "A memory haunts me, a memory of misery like yours! When the feudal barons invaded the South and sacked it, a troubadour cried like this: 'Ah! Toulouse and Provence, and the land of Argence, Beziers and Carcassonne, who saw you and who sees you!' Since then, the barons of northern industry have invaded and ruined us. We do not want to support them anymore. Forward! Stand up to repel them and their accomplices. Speak up, unite your voice, your prayer will take the tone of a command."

On 2 June 1907 an unprecedented mobilization took place at Nîmes. The 250,000 to 300 000 protesters arrived in the prefecture of Gard by special trains with reduced rates. On the square, out of solidarity a famous confectioner had posted on his facade "Grapes for wine, sugar for candy!".

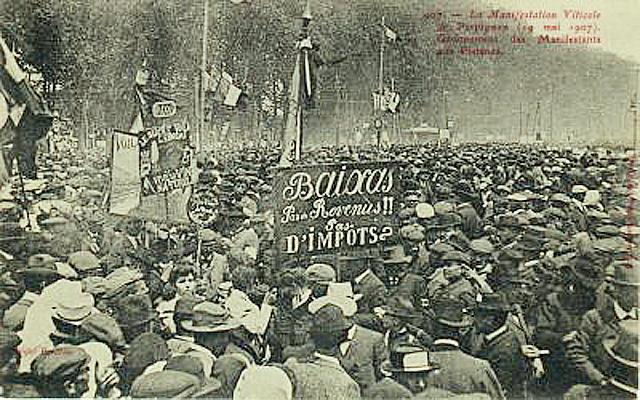
Perpignan. 19 May. Gathering of protesters at the Platanes

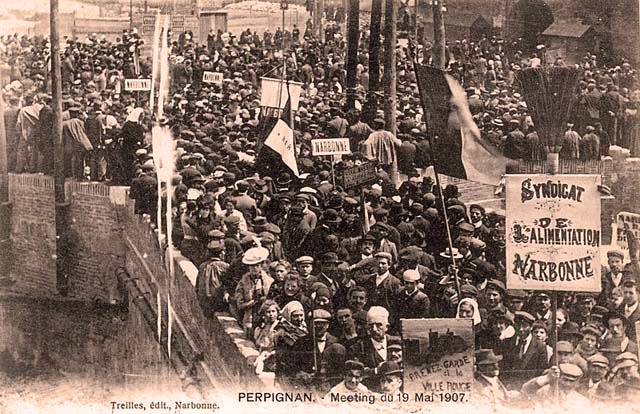
19 May. Traders alongside wine growers in Perpignan

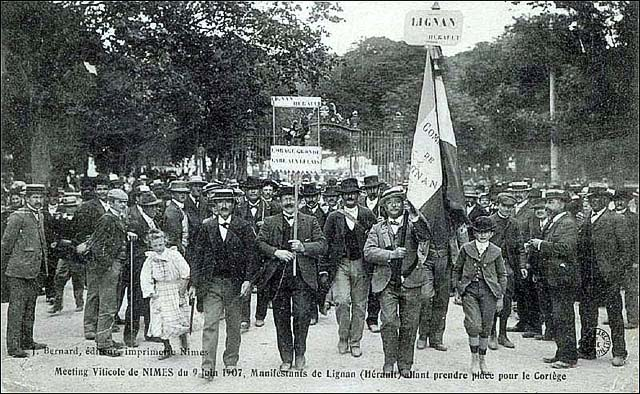
Nîmes. 2 June. Arrival of the Lignan delegation in front of the La Fontaine gardens

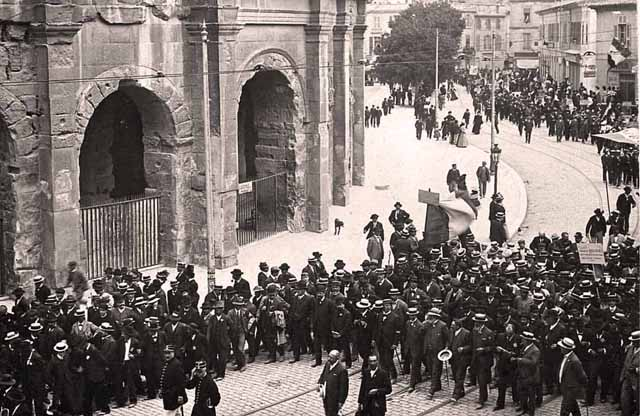
Nîmes. 2 June. Protesters passing between the Arena and the Palace of Justice

=== The Montpellier demonstration ===
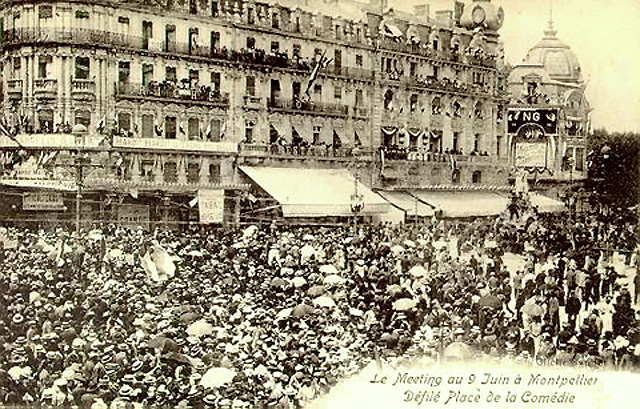
Montpellier. 9 June. Protesters invade the Place de la Comédie

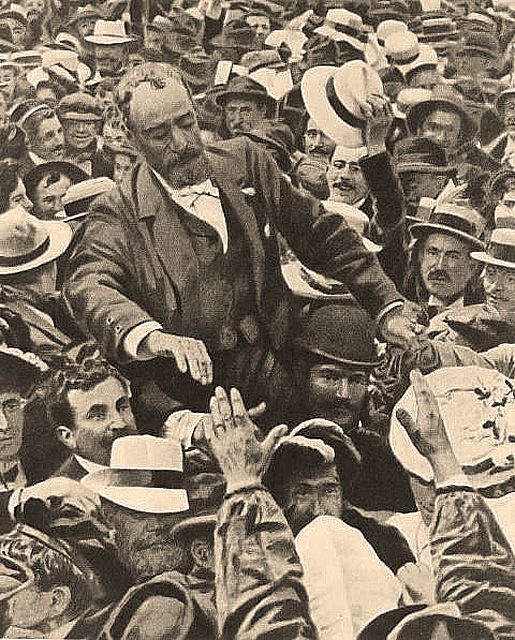
Marcelin Albert carried in triumph in Montpellier, 9 June 1907

On 9 June 1907 a gigantic gathering in Montpellier marked the climax of the vineyard challenge in the Midi. The Place de la Comédie was invaded by a crowd estimated to number from 600,000 to 800,000 people. In 1907 lower Languedoc had about a million inhabitants, so one of every two Languedocans was demonstrating. The mass mobilization transcended political or ideological views, since sympathizers of the socialist left and the royalist right stood side by side. This was the largest demonstration of the French Third Republic. In his speech Ernest Ferroul, mayor of Narbonne, called for the resignation of all his colleagues from Languedoc-Roussillon. He openly advocated civic disobedience. Marcelin Albert delivered such a speech that the journalist for Le Figaro wrote, "It was mad, sublime, terrifying".

The winegrowers' revolt received the endorsement of all political movements. From royalists to radicals, all actively supported the movement. All of Languedoc is allied against Georges Clemenceau, president of the Council. The Catholic Church even opened the doors of its cathedral and its churches. A statement from Bishop Anatole de Cabrieres said that women, children and striking winemakers would be welcomed to spend the night there. The same day, on the other side of the Mediterranean, about 50 000 people lined the streets of Algiers to support their colleagues in metropolitan France. A rumor began that the army was ready to intervene. Pierre Le Roy de Boiseaumarié, a legal student and future president of the Institut national de l'origine et de la qualité (INAO) and the International Organisation of Vine and Wine (OIV) whose family was in Vendargues, set fire to the door of the courthouse of Montpellier to prevent the troops who had been confined inside from shooting at the demonstrators.

The deadline for the ultimatum to the government came on 10 June 1907. While Clemenceau counted on a weak and short revolt, the parliamentary commission submitted its report to the Parliament which began to examine Caillaux's bill. Faced with deliberate delays in the legislature, Ernest Ferroul decided to announce publicly in Narbonne his resignation as mayor. In front of 10,000 people he said from the balcony of the Hôtel de Ville (city hall), "Citizens, citizens I hold my power from you, I return it! The municipal strike begins". This position taken in the absence of a government solution was approved by 442 municipalities of Languedoc Roussillon who resigned in the week. Black flags adorned the facades of town halls and civic disobedience was declared, the weapon of the elected officials. Meanwhile clashes between protesters and law enforcers were becoming commonplace.

On 11 June Jean Jaurès, who defended the vine growers cause in the Chamber of Deputies, filed a counter-bill with Jules Guesde. The two socialist deputies proposed nationalization of the wine estates. The next day, Clemenceau addressed a half-threatening, half-ironic missive to all the mayors of the wine-growing towns of Languedoc and Roussillon. This earned him a scathing reply from Ernest Ferroul: "Monsieur Clemenceau, since the beginning of our demonstrations, has considered us as big children, good boys, but unaware of our actions. He is one of those who think that in the Midi everything ends with songs or farandoles. He is very wrong, he does not know us." The head of government then asked Albert Sarraut to bring Ferroul to the negotiating table. The former mayor told him: "When we have three million men behind us, we do not negotiate".

=== Suppression of the revolt ===
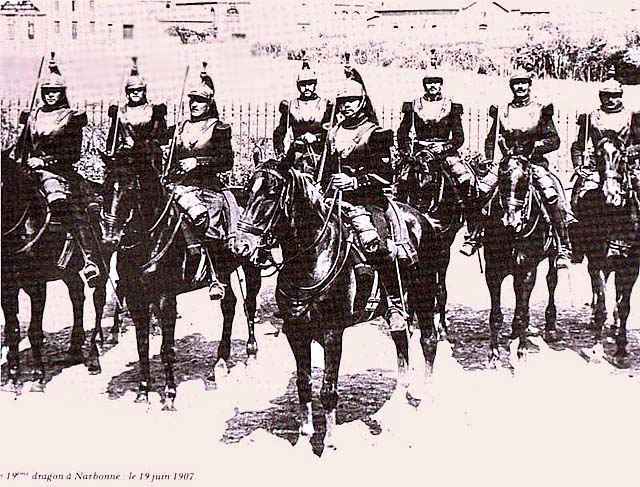
19th Dragoons in Narbonne on 19 June 1907

So far the Sunday demonstrations had been calm and disciplined, and the protesters wanted to remain peaceful. However, Clemenceau judged that the law must show strength and appealed to the army to restore order. From 17 June 1907 the Midi was occupied by 22 regiments of infantry and 12 regiments of cavalry, with 25,000 infantry and 8,000 horsemen. The gendarmerie was ordered to imprison the leaders of the demonstrations. Sarraut refused to endorse this policy and resigned from the government. On 19 June Ernest Ferroul was arrested at dawn at his home in Narbonne by troops of the 139th Infantry Regiment and imprisoned in Montpellier. Three other members of the viticultural defense committee gave themselves up to the gendarmes at Argeliers. News of the planned arrest of all members of the Committee of Argeliers caused an explosion.

The crowd hindered the progress of the gendarmes by lying on the ground. Narbonne was in a state of siege. A spontaneous demonstration began that called for liberation of the members of the Committee and for revenge. There were incidents throughout the day. The sub-prefecture was stormed and barricades blocked the streets. In the evening, in the general confusion, the cavalry fired on the crowd. There were two deaths, including a 14-year-old. Marcelin Albert, who had not been arrested, was hidden in the belfry of Argeliers. A new underground defense committee was formed immediately, with Louis Blanc as leader. In the departments of Gard, Hérault, Aude and Pyrénées-Orientales municipal councils resigned collectively – up to 600 councilors – and some called for a tax strike. The situation became more and more tense, with the furious winegrowers attacking official buildings.

The next day, 20 June, tension rose further and the Midi ignited. In Perpignan the prefecture was looted and burned. The prefect David Dautresme had to take refuge on the roof. In Montpellier the crowd clashed with the armed forces. In Narbonne the police inspector Grossot, one of those responsible for the arrest of Ferroul, was taken to task and hurt by the crowd. To clear it, the troops were ordered to fire on the demonstrators. Five were killed including a girl aged 20, Julie (called Cecile) Bourrel, who had come to Narbonne by chance on the market day. Nearly 33 were injured and lying on the ground. In the Café Paincourt, which was strafed, the worker Louis Ramon died in agony.

On 22 June 1907 in Narbonne 10,000 people attend the funeral of Cecile. This burial was the last great demonstration of the Midi winegrowers. In the meantime, Parliament having renewed its confidence in the government, L'Humanité of Jaurès carried the headline, "The House acquits the mass killers of the Midi".

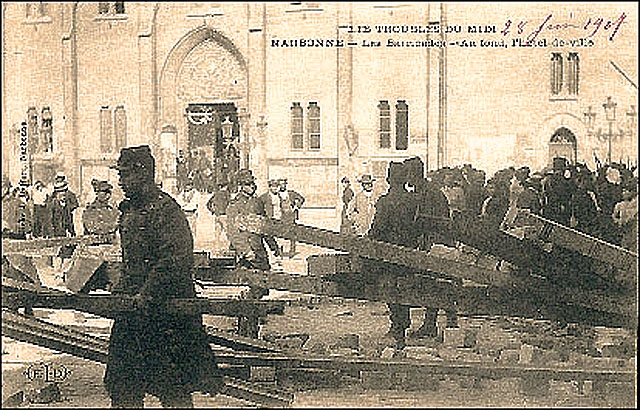
Barricades in Narbonne in front of the Town Hall

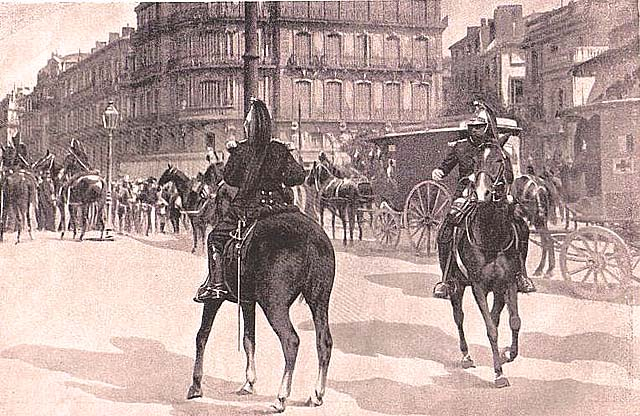
Dragoons patrol the streets of Narbonne on 20 June 1907

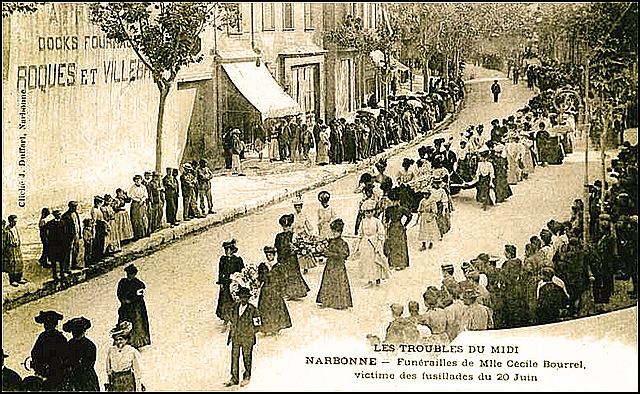
Funeral of Cecile Bourrel

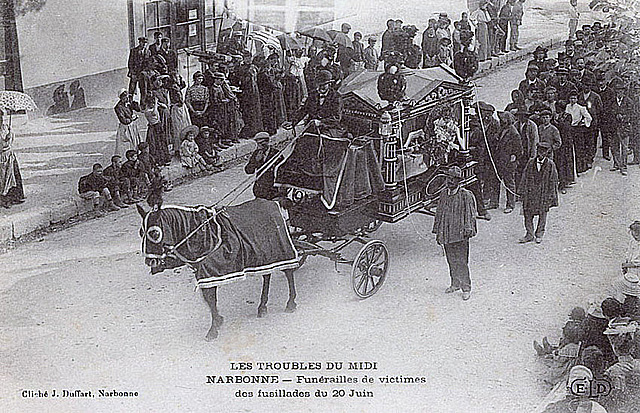
Funeral of the victims of the 20 June shootings

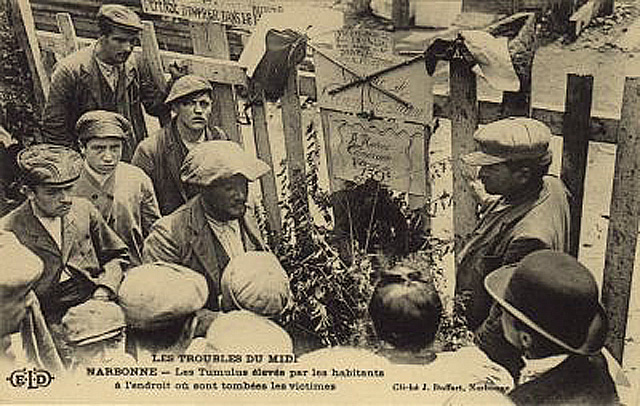
Tumulus in memory of a victim of 20 June 1907

=== 17th regiment mutiny ===
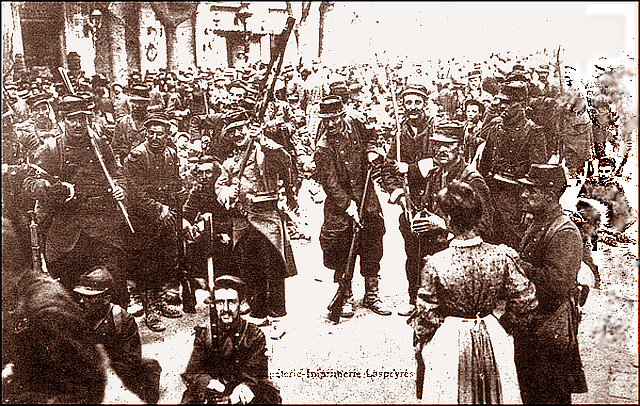
Soldiers of the 17th on the Allées Paul Riquet in Béziers

The 17th line infantry regiment was composed of reservists and conscripts from the region. It was transferred from Béziers to Agde on 18 June 1907. When they heard the gunfire on the evening of 20 June about 500 soldiers from the 6th company of the regiment mutinied. They looted the armory and moved back towards Béziers. After a night march of about 20 kilometres (12 mi) they arrived in Béziers early in the morning of 21 June, where they were warmly welcomed. They fraternized with the demonstrators, occupied the Allées Paul Riquet and peacefully opposed the armed forces already in the city. The soldiers then peacefully settled in the Allées Paul Riquet. The population offered them wine and food.

The Midi was on the verge of insurrection. In Paulhan the railway was put out of action by demonstrators who stopped a military convoy sent to check the mutineers. In Lodève the sub-prefect was taken hostage. The military authorities could not accept the mutiny which could spread to other regiments of the region.

There was alarm in Paris, and Clemenceau faced a vote of no confidence. He played his trump card by telling the military command to hunt down the mutineers in daylight. Negotiations followed and in the afternoon, after obtaining a guarantee that they would not be punished, the soldiers of the 17th laid down their arms and went under escort and without any major incident to the station. On 22 June they returned to their barracks in Agde by train. Clemenceau announced the end of the mutiny and won a vote of confidence by 327 votes against 223. On 23 June a law was finally passed that stopped massive chaptalization of wine.

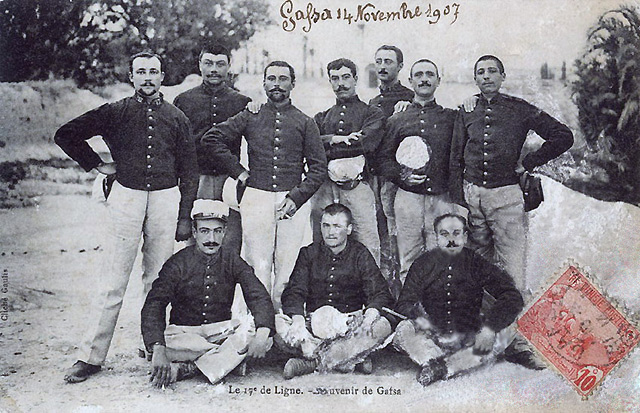
17th Line Infantry Regiment at Gafsa

After the negotiation and the agreement to move to avoid collective punishment, the mutineers of the 17th were assigned to Gafsa in Tunisia. They were not assigned to a disciplinary cantonment but retained ordinary military status, so contrary to legend there were no immediate penalties. However, during World War I (1914–18) because of their reputation as deserters they were likely to be sent to the front line, particularly in the bloody assaults of 1914. After these events the army ensured that conscripts performed military service far from home.

The mutiny of the soldiers of 17th is still known by the song by Montéhus, Glory to the 17th. The chorus proclaims: "Salute, salute to you, brave soldiers of the seventeenth ...".

Georges Clemenceau was disturbed by the mobilization of the Midi winemakers and the mutiny of 17th that followed. The revolt intensified each week and threatened to reach other wine regions. Solidarity of local and national elected officials threatened to undermine the government majority. But the most disturbing aspect remained the mutiny of the soldiers. Governments of the Third Republic used the army to impose their will, and the mutiny threatened to leave them without the force needed to confront a mobilized working class and peasantry.

== End of the 1907 crisis ==
=== Marcelin Albert meets Clemenceau ===
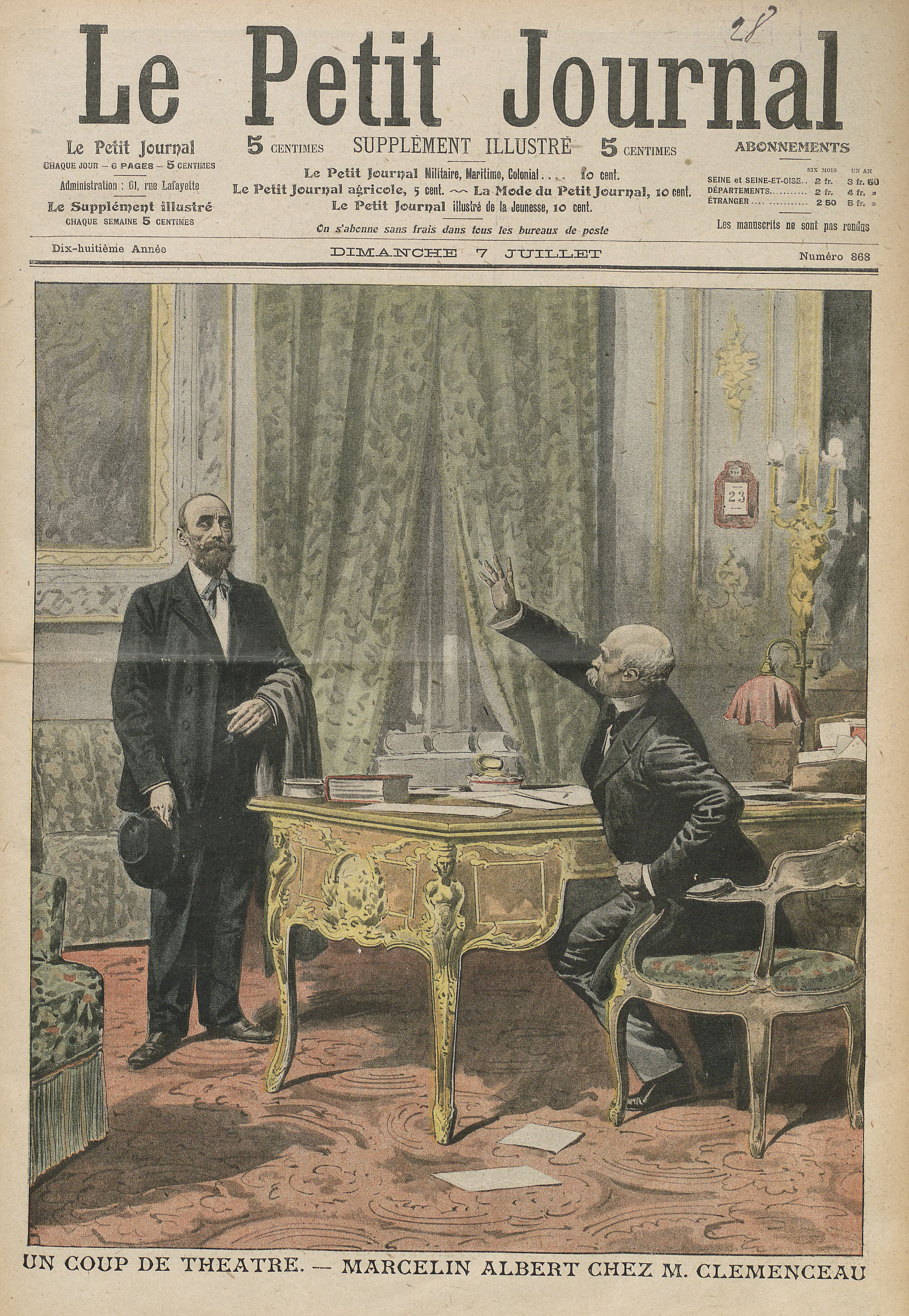
Marcelin Albert and Clemenceau, front page of Le Petit Journal, 7 July 1907

Unexpected help came from Argeliers. Chased by the police, Marcelin Albert was forced to hide and then flee to Paris where he arrived on 22 June 1907. The National Assembly, in full debate over the bill against fraud, refused to receive him. Georges Clemenceau heard of his presence and agreed to grant him a hearing. The premier received him in his role of Minister of the Interior at Place Beauvau. During their interview he promised to repress fraud if, in return, Albert returned to Languedoc to calm the rebellion. Albert even agreed to be a prisoner. Clemenceau signed a safe-conduct for his return to the Aude and gave him one hundred francs to pay for his return by train. Albert was naive enough to accept it.

Clemenceau took the opportunity to give his version to the political journalists and stressed the history of the payment. The national dailies took this up and Albert's status changed from redeemer to sell-out. On 24 June Albert was back in Narbonne. He met the members of the new defense committee and tried to convince them to suspend the movement. However, the interview with Clemenceau had totally discredited him in their eyes. On 26 June Albert went to Montpellier to become a prisoner. On his release, no longer wanted in the Aude, he moved to Algeria. There the winemakers clubbed together to support someone who had defended their profession, but Albert died in poverty.

=== Anti-fraud law ===
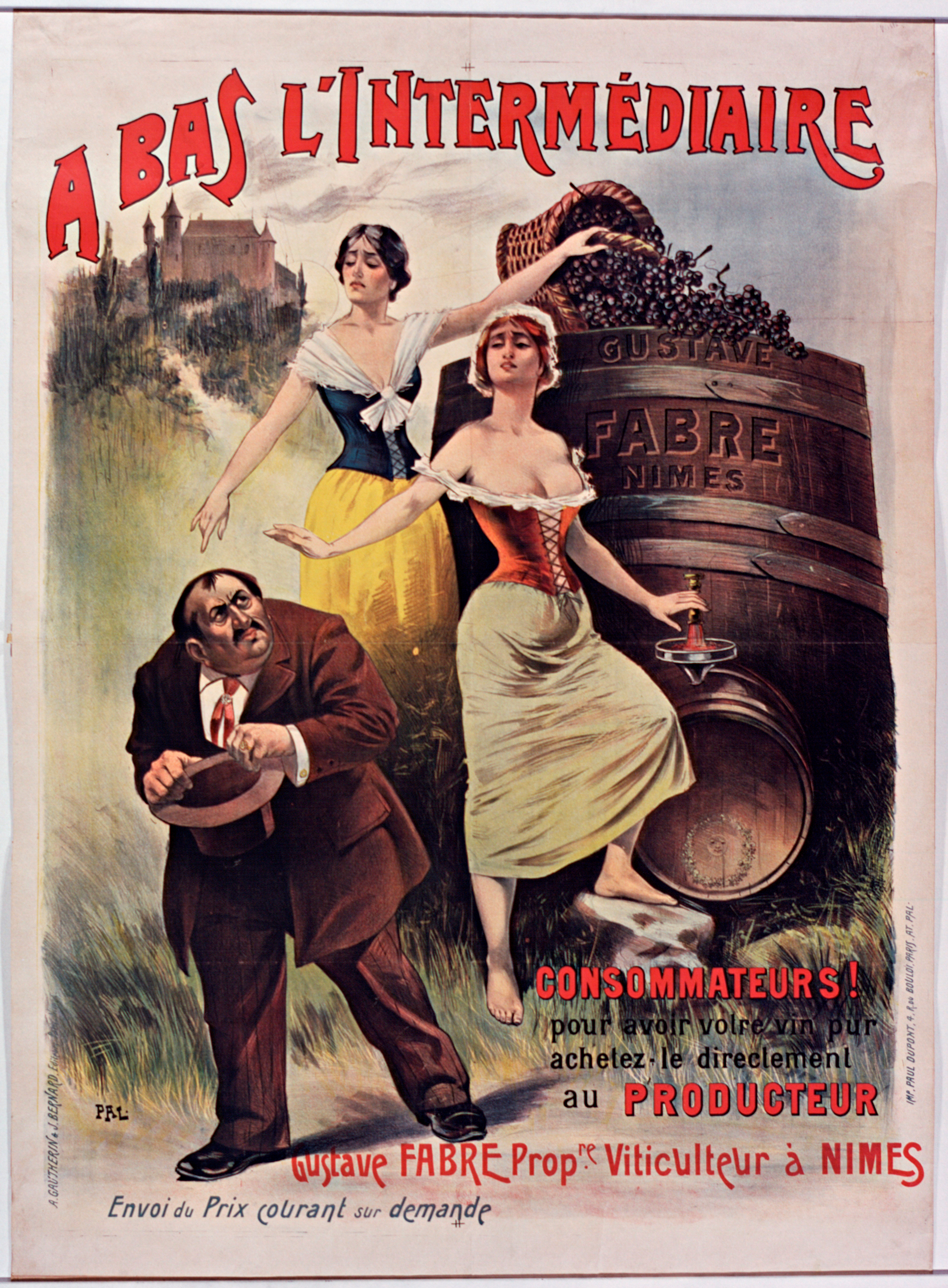
Down with the middleman

On 29 June 1907 parliament came together to deal with the pressure of events. Jean Jaurès warned his colleagues: "The event that is developing down there, and which has not exhausted its consequences, is one of the greatest social events that have occurred in thirty-five years. At first we were not careful; it was in the South, and there is a myth about the South. One imagines that it is the land of vain promises. We forget that the Midi has a long serious, passionate and tragic history." The law protecting natural wine against tampered wine was adopted. It prohibited manufacture and sale of falsified or manufactured wines. All owners must now declare the area of their vineyards. The legislature also required declarations of harvests and stocks, and gave trade unions the right to raise charges of fraud for civil trial.

On the same day the deputies enacted a law "to prevent the watering of wines and the abuse of sugar by a surtax on the sugar and the obligation of traders to declare sales of sugar higher than 25 kilograms (55 lb)." The law of 15 July 1907 completed that of 29 June 1907 by regulating the circulation of wines and spirits.

On 31 August 1907 the government agreed to exempt wine growers from taxes on their crops of 1904, 1905 and 1906. On 3 September 1907 a new decree was issued stating that: "No drink may be owned or transported for sale or sold under the name of wine unless it comes exclusively from the alcoholic fermentation of fresh grapes or grape juice" . As a result fraud became almost impossible. On 21 October 1907 another decree established the "Fraud Repression Service" and defined its functions, authority and resources.

=== General Confederation of Midi Winemakers ===
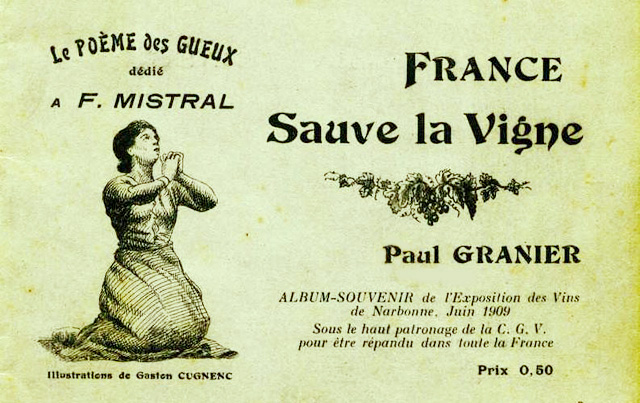
Souvenir album of the CGV published during the Narbonne salon in 1909

On 15 September 1907 the last issue of the Tocsin came out, and the paper became the Vendémiaire. The time of Marcelin Albert was definitely over. A week later, on 22 September, the Wine Defense Committee was dissolved and the General Confederation of vine growers of the South (CGV) was constituted. Its main mission was to fight against fraud and to protect the social and economic interests of producers. The first president of the CGV was Ernest Ferroul and Elie Bernard became its Secretary General.

All the imprisoned leaders and members of the Argeliers committee had been released since 2 August 1907 as a gesture of reconciliation. On 5 October 1907 those considered responsible for the demonstrations and riots were declared liable by the court of assize. But after appeals were lodged the trials were never held and all were pardoned in 1988.

== End of the overproduction crisis ==
=== Pinard of the poilus ===
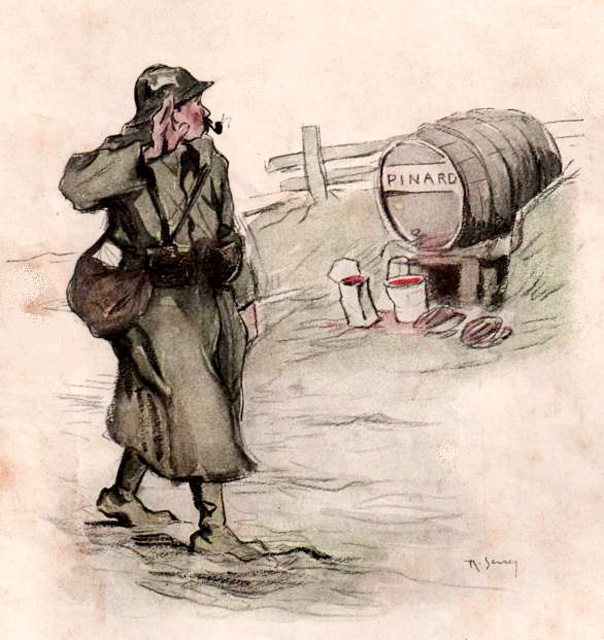
Salute to Father Pinard

The chronic overproduction was first absorbed by the poilus (common soldiers) of World War I (1914–18). Until then, wine was not part of the soldier's routine in time of peace or war. Army regulations said, "Water is the normal drink of soldiers". In October 1914 the Intendance militaire^{(fr)} warned that in the long war that was expected a ration of wine should be added to improve life of the ordinary soldier in the trenches. This was the origin of Père Pinard, a very mediocre wine with little or no taste". Since this was the army the pinard of the poillu was a blend of low-grade red wines such as Maconnais, Beaujolais or Charentes with large amounts of wine from Languedoc-Roussillon, Algeria and Tunisia. The only goal was to reach 9° alcohol.

Every soldier received a quarter of a liter of wine each day, which was relatively easy to supply given the abundant harvest of 1914. In January 1916 Parliament recognized that this ration was not enough, and doubled it. That year, after the Battle of Verdun, Jean Richepin wrote, "In the glasses of peasants, as well as in chalices touched with a trembling hand, let them drink the pinard of the poilus, poured by our silent canteens and paid as much as possible for the benefit of widows and orphans in France". The pinard was therefore invested with a triple mission, sustain morale while contributing to victory and national unity. The half-liter ration was increased in January 1918 to three quarters of a liter per day.

The demand from the army was therefore enormous, and in 1918 it requisitioned a third of the French harvest, including colonies. The requisitioned wine was left with the producers for storage and withdrawn according to military needs. In return, the winemaker or wine cooperative received a bonus of twenty centimes per 100 liters per month. From the cellars the wine was sent to large regional warehouses in Béziers, Sète, Carcassonne, Lunel and Bordeaux. From there it was sent to the storage tanks in the rear of the front, replenished every two days. Each convoy carried an average of 400,000 liters. Immediately packaged in barrels, the pinard was then shipped by train and truck to the front.

The massive supply of wine to the troops had the effect of increasing alcoholism in this generation of men. After 1918 there was again overproduction in the vineyards. It was partly offset by an increase in wine consumption that lasted until June 1940, when wartime restrictions enforced national abstinence.

=== Partial conversion of the vineyard ===
Locations in France

A solution to the endemic causes of the viticultural crisis was long delayed. From the 1920s to the 1970s Languedoc continued to experience successive crises of overproduction and slump. It was assumed that the crises were inevitable due to the vine monoculture. It was not resolved until the 1960s, when agricultural change was made possible by the Canal du Bas-Rhône Languedoc^{(fr)}, an irrigation canal that brings water from the Rhone to the south of the department of Gard and the east of the department of Héraultin. This work was spearheaded by Philippe Lamour, "father" of the policy of regional planning in France and in 1955 president of the National Planning Company of the Bas-Rhône and Languedoc region. In southern Gard and the east of Hérault water was distributed by the BRL Group. It was supplied by the National Development Company of the Lower Rhône and Languedoc.

=== Wines of the pays d'Oc ===
The real solution to the crisis was through wine production under the "vin de pays" label. The bulk of Languedoc wine production received this label by the decree of 15 October 1987, defended by the Union of Pays d'Oc Wine Producers. Today "Pays-d'oc (IGP)", until 2009 "Vin de pays d'Oc", is a French regional wine of Indication géographique protégée (protected geographical indication, the new name for vin de pays) produced throughout the wine region of Languedoc-Roussillon. It is one of the most important of French wines, and accounts for almost half of Languedoc vineyard production, 60% of the volume of all French PGIs with 530 million liters produced in 2009, the equivalent of 760 million bottles. It is also the most exported wine, with 210 million liters shipped abroad in 2009, 18% of French wine exports.

The IGP region also contains areas with more restricted terroir: Aude, Pays-d'Hérault, Gard, Pyrenees-Orientales and 57 IGPs with zone denominations.

== Centenary of the revolt ==
The centennial of the winemakers' revolt of 1907 was included in the list of national celebrations in the year 2007. During the celebration of the hundredth anniversary of the revolt of the paupers many exhibitions and cultural events took place in the department of Aude, including Argeliers, birthplace of the movement of 1907, Sallèles-d'Aude and Coursan as well as in Gard and Pyrénées Orientales, and in Herault, Capestang and Béziers. At the Museum of Cruzy, in the department of Herault, four banners are exhibited that were used during the events of 1907. They are classified as Historical Monuments.

== See also ==
- Angelets – Catalan peasant rebels, 1667–1675
- Croquant rebellions – French peasant revolts from 1594 to 1637
- Peasants' revolt of 996 in Normandy – War in medieval Europe
- Revolt of the Pitauds – French peasant riots over salt taxes from 1541 to 1549
- Revolutions of 1848 – Series of political upheavals in Europe
- Revolutions of 1917–1923 – Revolutionary wave after World War I

== Sources ==
- Bassagana, Sylvie (March 2009), "L'apparition de la coopération à Baixas (1907-1930)", Domitia (in French) (10): 105–116
- Bon, Nicolas (27 March 2010), "Midi 1907, l'histoire d'une révolte vigneronne", vin-terre-net.com (in French), archived from the original on 26 July 2010
- BRL (a), "Cartes d'" origine des ressources périmètres eau brut " de BRL", BRL le Gard (in French), archived from the original on 2008-11-19
- BRL (b), "'Hérault", BRL (in French), archived from the original on 19 November 2008
- BRL (c), Présentation du groupe, BRL
- Castillon, René (19 June 2007), "Le 19 juin 1907, la crise de la viticulture languedocienne débouche...", La Vie (in French)
- Célébration des événements de 1907 dans l'Aude (in French), archived from the original on 2007-12-29
- Clavel, Jean (15 August 2006), Histoire de la chaptalisation (in French), archived from the original on 3 March 2016
- Clavel, Jean (24 May 2006b), Juin 1907 : Actions, sang et larmes (in French), archived from the original on 9 November 2012
- Coquelicots, "Une brève histoire du vin en France", vinsdegarde.com (in French)
- Coulondou, Henry, 1907 La Révolte des Vignerons (in French), archived from the original on 2022-12-01
- Cruzy, Le mot du Maire, Cruzy, archived from the original on 2018-08-29
- Deroubaix, Christophe; Le Puill, Gérard; Raynal, Alain (2007), Les Vendanges de la colère, midi viticole 1907/2007 (in French), Au diable vauvert
- DGCCFR (1 December 2008), Avant la loi 1905, Direction générale de la concurrence, de la consommation et de la répression des fraudes, archived from the original on 1 December 2008
- Diemer, Hubert, Les vins algériens des années coloniales (in French)
- Ferré, Georges (1997), 1907, La guerre du vin. Chronique d'une désobéissance civique dans le midi (in French), Éditions Loubatières
- Ferré, Georges (March 2007), "Le Midi viticole, rouge de colère", historia.fr (in French)
- Gavignaud-Fontaine, Geneviève (2007), "1907 : quand les gueux sauvèrent le vin", Lepoint.fr (in French)
- Histoire du Roussillon : Crise viticole de 1907, un évènement marquant du XXe siècle (in French)
- "La cave de Maraussan", languedoc-roussillon.culture.gouv.fr (in French), archived from the original on 2010-06-09
- Lalouette, Jacqueline (1997), "Alcoolisme et classe ouvrière en France aux alentours de 1900", Cahiers d'histoire (in French) (42–1), doi:10.4000/ch.11
- Lamiral, Marianne (21 June 2007), "Il y a cent ans, de mars à juin 1907 : La révolte des vignerons du midi", Lutte Ouvrière (2029), archived from the original on 26 May 2012
- Le Roy Ladurie, Emmanuel (May 2007), "1907, le millésime de la colère", L'Histoire (in French) (320)
- Lo beret liure (24 March 2011), "Regards sur la Commune de 1871 à Narbonne", bellaciao.org
- Marres, Paul (1939), "Le problème du vin dans le Bas-Languedoc", Annales de géographie (in French) (274)
- Massé, Ludovic (1984), Le vin pur (in French), Paris: P.O.L
- Maurin, Jules; Pech, Rémy (2007), 1907, les mutins de la République : la révolte du Midi viticole (in French), Toulouse: Privat
- Pénet, Martin, ed. (1998), Mémoire de la chanson, 1100 chansons du Moyen Âge à 1919 (in French), éditions Omnibus, Imprimé par Normandie Roto Impression
- Phélip, Gaston (8 November 1917), "Le vin du soldat", Le Pays de France (in French) (160)
- "Poids économique des vins de cépages pays d'Oc IGP au sein de la filière française" (PDF), vindepaysdoc.com (in French), Syndicat des producteurs de vin de pays d’Oc, July 2010
- Pouget, Richard, Evènements Viticoles de 1907 (in French)
- Saltarelli, Jean-Pierre (2000), Les Côtes du Ventoux, origines et originalités d'un terroir de la vallée du Rhône, A. Barthélemy, Avignon, 2000, ISBN 2879230411
- Sommières, La crise viticole de 1907 (in French), archived from the original on 2011-10-30
- Tartakowsky, Danielle, "La Grève Des Viticulteurs", Histoire par l'image (in French)
- Tenaguillo y Cortázar, Amancio, Le vin sur la scène de l'histoire. 1907 : La révolte des vignerons dans le Midi (in French)
- Théobald, Gérard (2014-04-29), La Liberté est ou n'est pas... (in French), Editions Publibook, ISBN 978-2-342-02233-9
- Tosti, Jean, La vigne et ses problèmes (in French), archived from the original on 2018-11-26
- Trinquier, Bruno, Les Evenements de Juin 1907 dans le Midi Viticole (in French)
- Trinquier (b), Bruno, Marcelin Albert, le meneur (in French), archived from the original on 2009-09-25
- Vignerons coopérateurs de l'Hérault, Histoire de la coopération (in French), Vignerons coopérateurs de l'Hérault, archived from the original on 2011-09-25
- Zola, Emile, "La révolte des vignerons de 1907", emilezola.fr (in French), archived from the original on 2009-01-03
