= Winemaking cooperative =

Agricultural cooperative

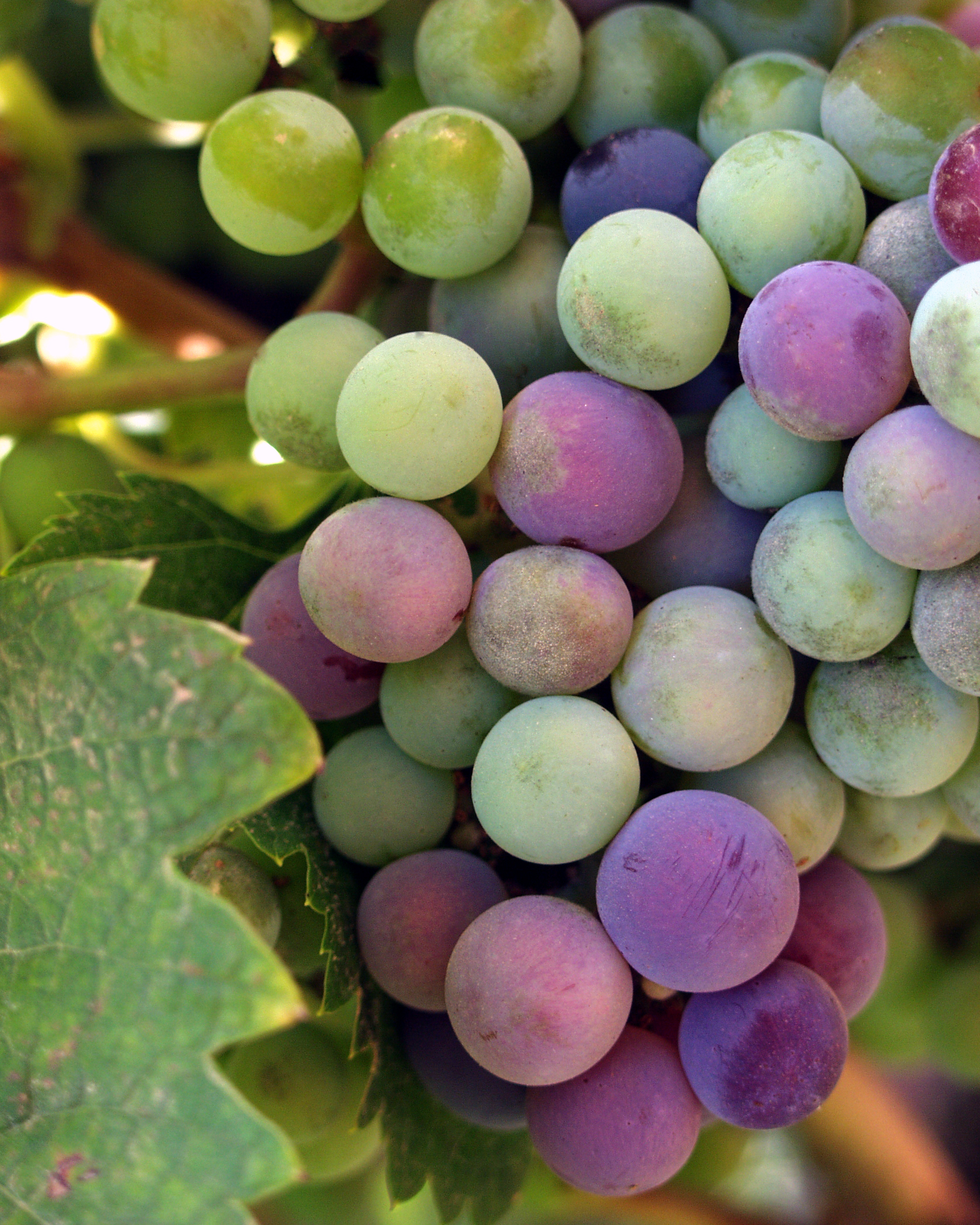
Wine grapes undergoing véraison

A winemaking cooperative is an agricultural cooperative which is involved in winemaking, and which in a similar way to other cooperatives is owned by its members. The members in a winemaking cooperative are usually vineyard owners, who deliver grapes to the cooperative, which is involved in production of wine from the grapes and the subsequent marketing activities.

Winemaking cooperatives are responsible for a significant proportion of the total wine production in many major wine-producing countries, including most of the classical European wine countries, but their importance varies much between different wine regions within these countries. Cooperatives tend to be more important in regions where the wine’s selling price is relatively low and average size of vineyard holdings is small.

While some winemaking cooperatives were established in the 19th century, the majority were established in the early 1930s following the Great Depression.

== Advantages to members ==
The advantage to members of a cooperative, in comparison to pursuing winemaking and marketing on their own, consists in pooling resources and sharing costs for winemaking and marketing, which call for costly equipment and technical expertise. There are also other financial advantages, including certain European Union subsidies for cooperatives located in EU countries.

Wines from cooperatives are often allowed to be described as producer-bottled according to the wine laws of the country in question, which is sometimes an advantage in marketing. The French term corresponding to this is mis(e) en bouteille à la propriété, while the German is Erzeugerabfüllung.

== Alternatives available to wine-growers ==
Producing and marketing wine on their own is usually not a realistic possibility for many vineyard owners with small holdings. However, being a member of a winemaking cooperative is not the only option available. Selling grapes on the open market, entering into long-term contracts with negociants or other winemaking companies and leasing out the vineyard to certain negociants are other options. The relative attractiveness of these options varies greatly between regions. As an example, in regions characterised by constant overproduction of wine, the market price of grapes is often depressed to a very low level, while grapes in Champagne command much higher prices as long as they fulfill some basic criteria.

== France ==
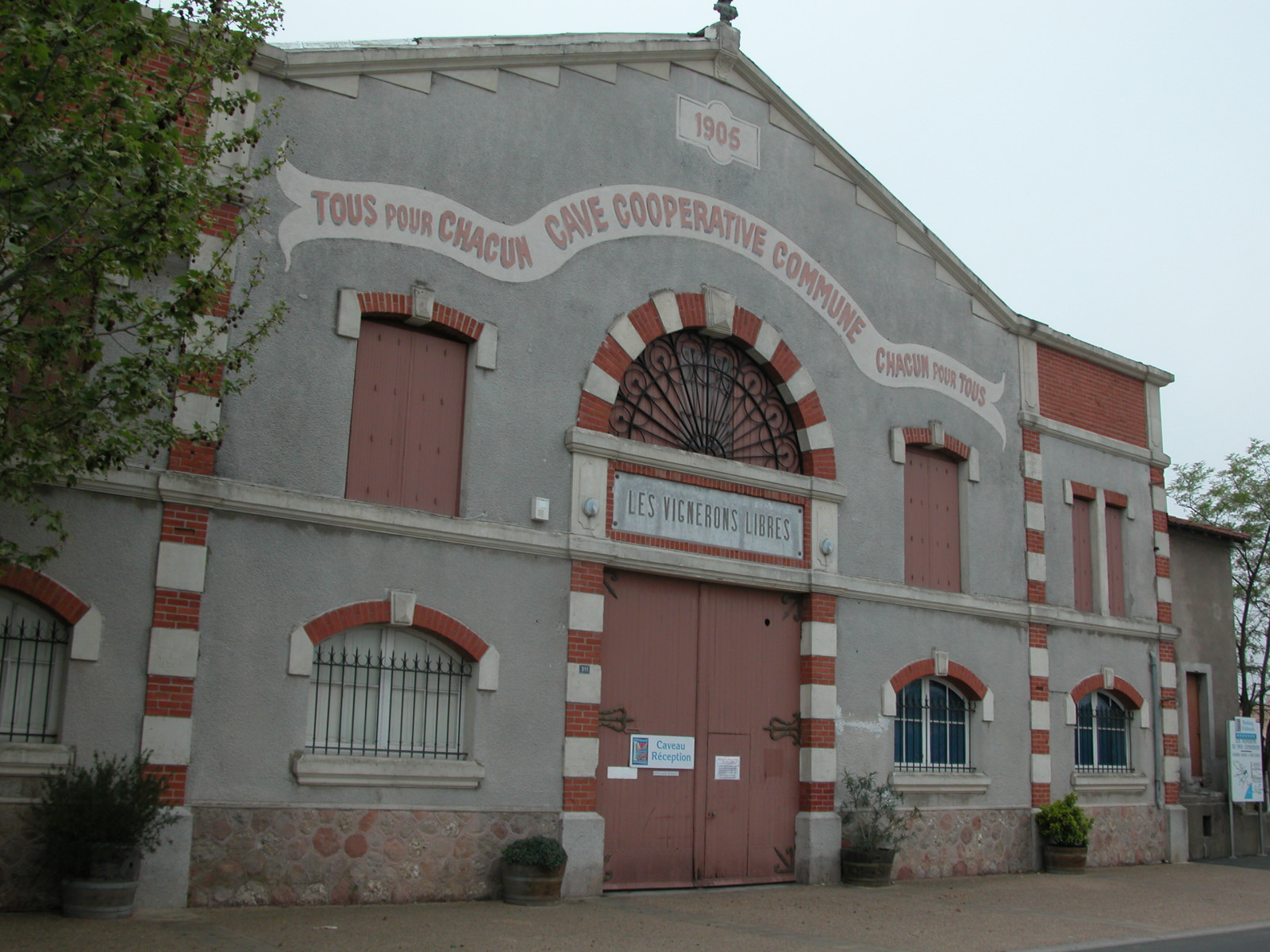
The winemaking cooperative in Maraussan in the Languedoc region is one of France's oldest.

In France, winemaking cooperatives are typically called caves coopératives, and produce more than half the total amount of French wine. The first winemaking cooperative was established in Alsace in 1895, although at this time Alsace was part of the German Empire rather than France. Members of French winemaking cooperatives own more than half the total French vineyard surface. The caves have their greatest strength on the Vin de pays level, where they are responsible for about three-quarter of the production. They have been involved in the large-scale switch over of the French wine production from the lower Vin de table category to Vin de pays. Many cooperatives also produce an impressive range of Appellation d'origine contrôlée (AOC) wine.

The total number of French winemaking cooperatives was over 850 in the early 2000s, with an average membership of 160 per cooperative in the 1990s. Cooperatives are particularly strong in Languedoc, Roussillon, Rhône, Provence and Corsica. Some of the more notable cooperatives are also found in Alsace and Chablis.

== Germany ==
In Germany, a winemaking cooperative is often called Winzergenossenschaft, but can also be called Winzerverein, Winzervereinigung, Weingärtnergenossenschaft or Weinbauerverband. The earliest German winemaking cooperatives date back to the time before the later association laws were established. A union of winemakers in Neckarsulm in Württemberg pressed grapes and sold the resulting must, and to some extent also wine, cooperatively as early as 1834. Prussia passed an association law (Genossenschaftsgesetz) in 1867, which became law in the entire North German Confederation in 1868. One of the first winemaking cooperatives founded on the basis of this legislation, Winzerverein Mayschoß, was established in 1868 in the Ahr region and is the oldest German winemaking cooperative still in existence. Two thirds of all German vine-growers belong to a cooperative, but because of a dominance of small vineyard holdings and part-time vine growing among these members, their production is slightly less than one-third of the German total. In 2008/2009, there were 209 cooperatives in Germany with a total of 51 000 members and 32,115 hectares (79,360 acres) vineyard surface. There has been a trend to fewer cooperatives (275 existed in 1998/1999) due to fusions.

A special form of winemaking cooperative is the Zentralkellereien, a centralized cooperative found in many German wine regions, where local cooperatives rather than individual growers deliver grapes, grape must or wine. Therefore, of the 209 cooperatives existing in Germany in 2008/2009, only 120 actually produced wine on their own premises.

Cooperatives are particularly important in Württemberg, where they account for 80% of the production (2008), Baden, where they account for 76%, and the smallest German wine regions Ahr, Hessische Bergstrasse, Saale-Unstrut and Saxony.

== Southern Europe ==
In southern Europe, cooperatives are responsible for a large proportion of wine production. Figures of around 60 percent have been quoted for Italy’s cantina sociale and cooperatives in Spain and Portugal. However, in contrast to the situation in France and Germany, a large proportion of cooperative members' wine is not bottled by the cooperative, but instead is sold in bulk for bottling by commercial operators or, especially in the case of Spain, for distillation.

== Other countries ==
In South Africa, KWV (Koöperatieve Wijnbouwers Vereniging van Zuid-Afrika) was originally formed as a winemaking cooperative which also had certain regulatory privileges akin to those of a government agency. However, in 2002, KWV was transformed into a regular commercial company.
