= Mas-Cabardès =

Commune in Occitanie, France

- Commune
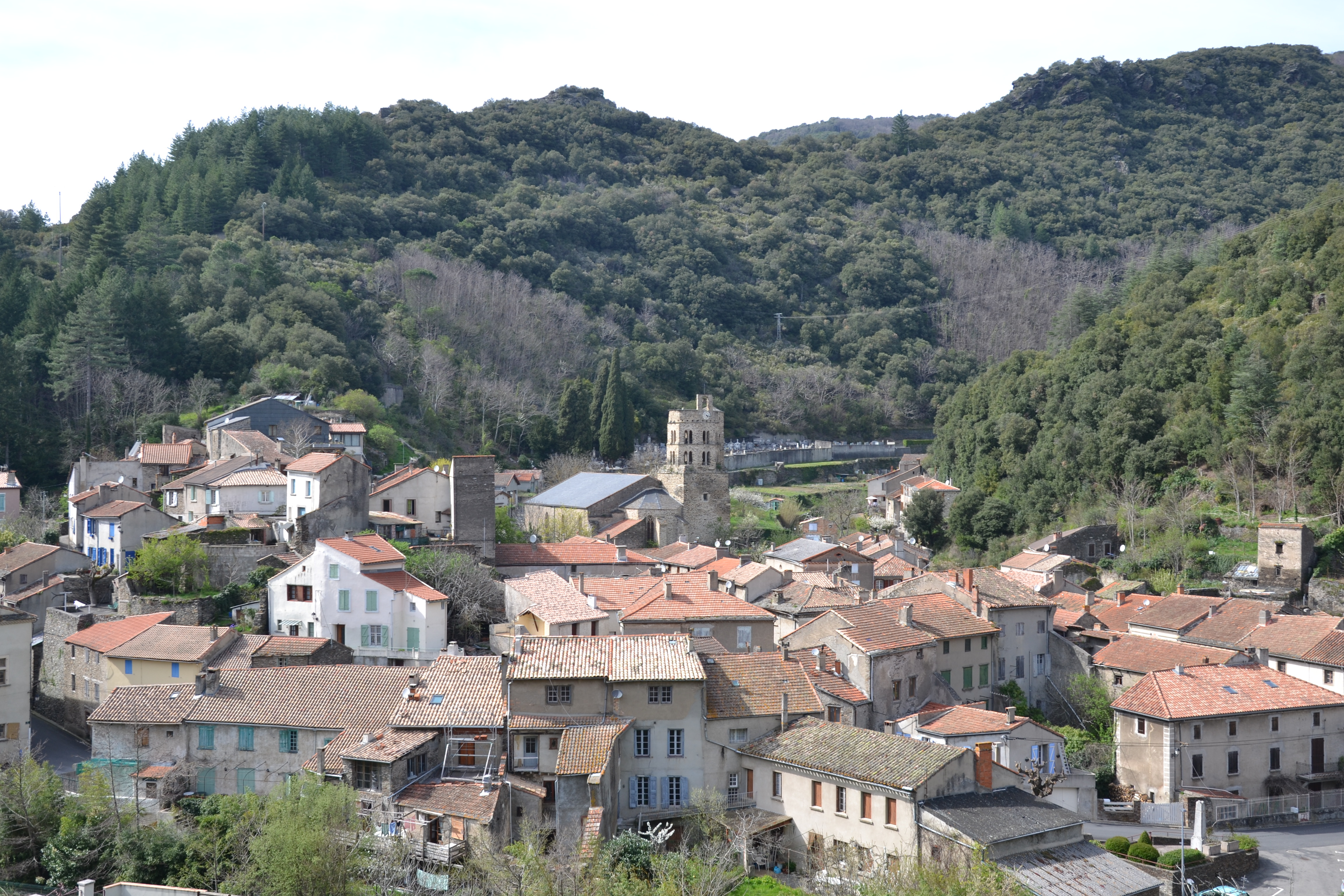
- A general view of Mas-Cabardès

- Coat of arms
- Location of Mas-Cabardès
- Location within France Location within Occitanie
- Coordinates: 43°22′18″N 2°21′47″E
- Country: France
- Region: Occitania
- Department: Aude
- Arrondissement: Carcassonne
- Canton: La Vallée de l'Orbiel
- Intercommunality: Montagne Noire

Government
  - Mayor (2020–2026): Nadia Doria
- Area^{1}: 9.09 km^{2} (3.51 sq mi)
- Elevation: 305 m (1,001 ft)
- Highest elevation: 945 m (3,100 ft)
- Lowest elevation: 286 m (938 ft)
- Population (2023): 166
  - Density: 18.3/km^{2} (47.3/sq mi)
- Time zone: UTC+01:00 (CET)
  - Summer (DST): UTC+02:00 (CEST)
- INSEE/Postal code: 11222 /11380
- ^{1} French Land Register data, which excludes lakes, ponds, glaciers > 1 km^{2} (0.386 sq mi or 247 acres) and river estuaries.

Mas-Cabardès (French pronunciation: [mas kabaʁdɛs]; Occitan: Lo Mas de Cabardés) is a commune in the Aude department in southern France.

== Population ==
Historical population
Year	Pop.	±% p.a.
1968	388	—
1975	310	−3.16%
1982	245	−3.31%
1990	235	−0.52%
1999	205	−1.51%
2007	200	−0.31%
2012	195	−0.51%
2017	185	−1.05%
2023	166	−1.79%
Source: INSEE

== See also ==
- Communes of the Aude department
