= Elisyces =

Ibero-Ligurian tribe

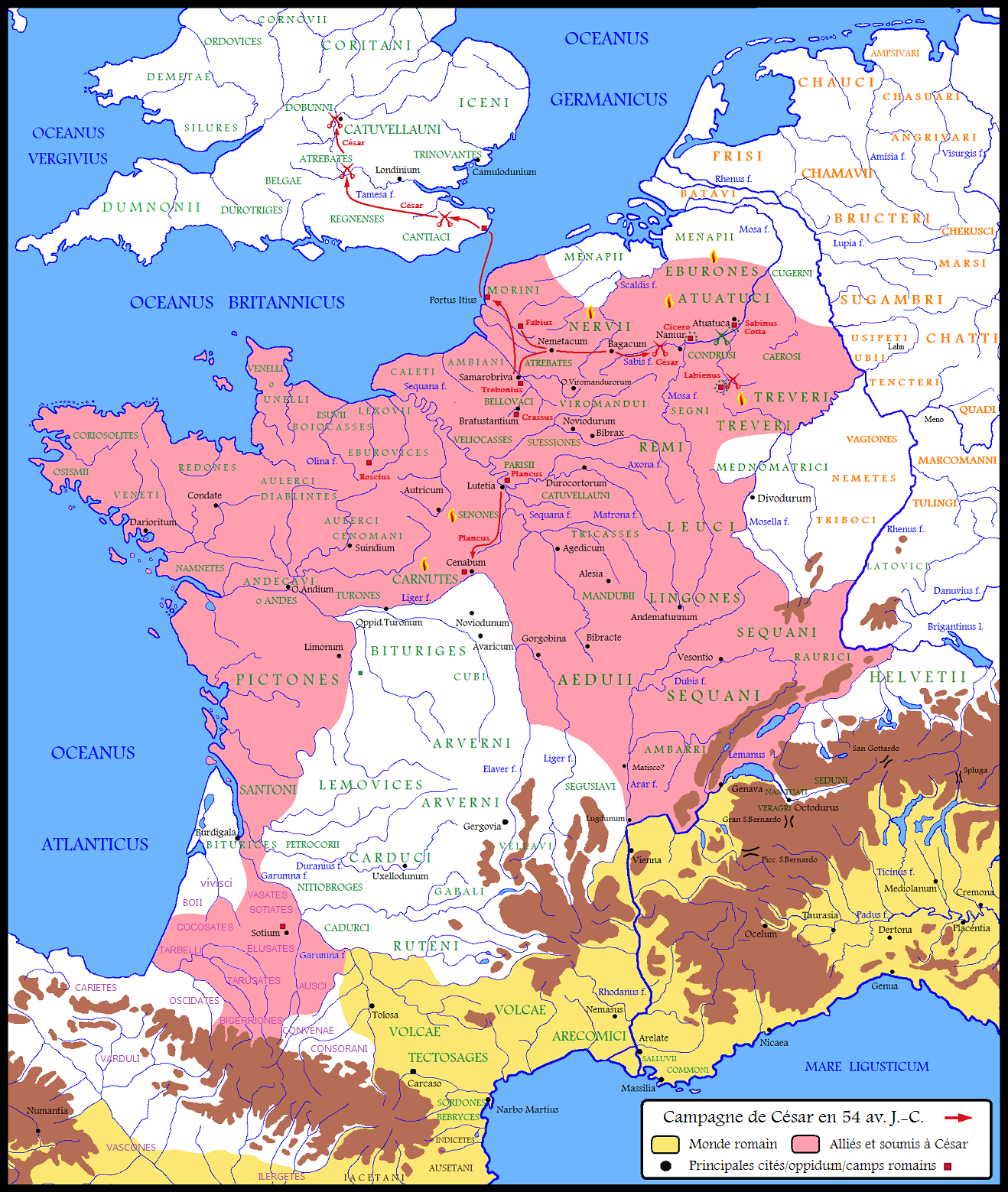
Ethnographic map of Gaul during Julius Caesar's campaign (54 BCE)

The Elisyces (Greek: Ἐλισύκοι; Latin: Elesyces, French: Élisyques) were a tribe that occupied the coastal plain of Septimania (present-day Occitania and former Languedoc-Roussillon) in ancient times. According to various literary sources, they established the ancient port city of Narbonne and were of Ibero-Ligurian origin.

The Elisyces seem to have been in contact with the peoples of the Mediterranean traders (Ancient Greeks, Etruscans, and Phoenicians) which they provided agricultural products and mineral resources from their territories or outlying areas and were routed to their commercial spaces (Pech Maho).

== History ==
The Roman colony of Narbo Martius was founded close to an older settlement: on the hill of Montlaurès, about 4 kilometers north of Narbonne, there was an oppidum that can be traced back to the 6th century BCE. Some scholars identify this settlement with Naro or Narbo, the capital of the Elisyces, an ancient tribe of Ibero-Ligurian origin, mentioned both in Ancient Greek and Roman literary sources, that were Celticized before the Roman conquest of Gaul. However, this literary mention in Avienius' didactic poem Ora maritima did not occur until the late 4th century CE, and thus only about half a millennium after the founding of Narbo Martius. Other scholars consider the identification of the oppidum of Montlaurès with Naro or Narbo to be unproven.

Nearby the oppidum lies the lower course of the river Aude (Latin: Atax), which in Roman times still divided into two branches. The northern branch flowed further east, similar to the river's current course, to meet the Étang de Berre, a lagoon of the Mediterranean Sea north of the Massif de la Clape, while the southern branch followed the course of today's Canal de la Robine along the Roman colony of Narbo Martius, flowing into the lagoon south of it.

The ancient city of Narbonne was established in Gaul by the Roman Republic in 118 BCE, as Colonia Narbo Martius, colloquially Narbo, and made into the capital of the newly established Roman province of Gallia Transalpina (modern-day Southwestern France). It was located on the Via Domitia, the first Roman road in Gaul, built at the time of the foundation of the colony, and connecting Italy to Spain. Geographically, Narbonne was therefore located at a very important crossroads because it was situated where the Via Domitia connected to the Via Aquitania, which led toward the Atlantic Ocean through the cities of Tolosa and Burdigala.
