= Narbonne-Plage =

Resort on the Mediterranean coast of France

- Town
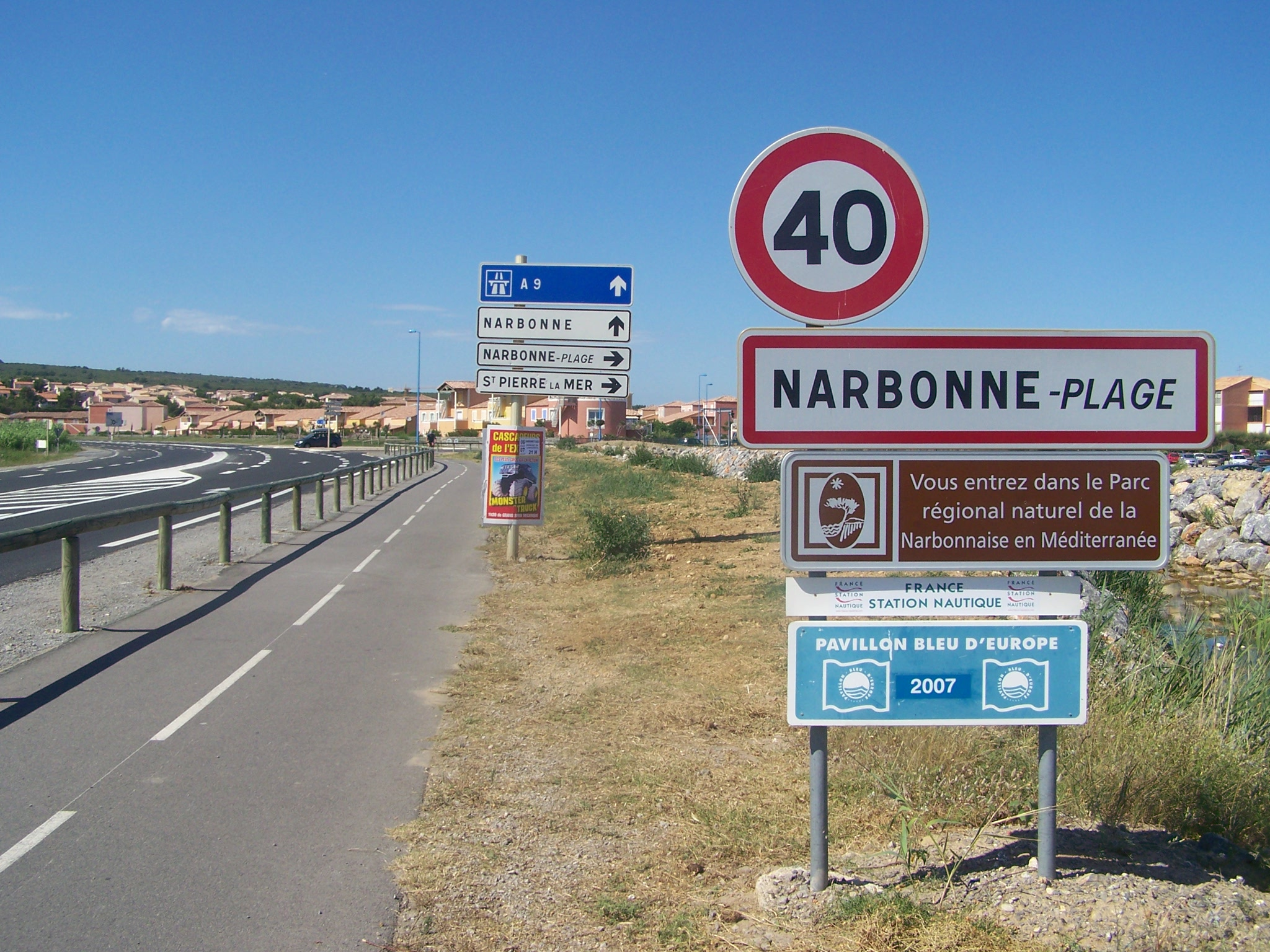
- Arrival at Narbonne-Plage and in the Narbonnaise en Méditerranée regional park

- Location within Occitanie Location within France
- Coordinates: 43°9′39″N 3°10′1″E
- Country: France
- Region: Occitania
- Department: Aude
- Intercommunality: Grand Narbonne
- Commune: Narbonne

Population (2011) (Note: Population during the summer season: 35,000, year-round: 2,500)
  - Total: 2,500
- Demonym: Narbonnaise

Narbonne-Plage is a resort on the southern (Mediterranean) coast of France in the commune of Narbonne, in the Aude department of the Occitanie region. It is separated from the city of Narbonne by the limestone Massif de la Clape and lies at its foot.

The town is heavily dependent upon the tourist trade. The beach currently holds blue flag status, an award it has held on multiple occasions.

== Location ==
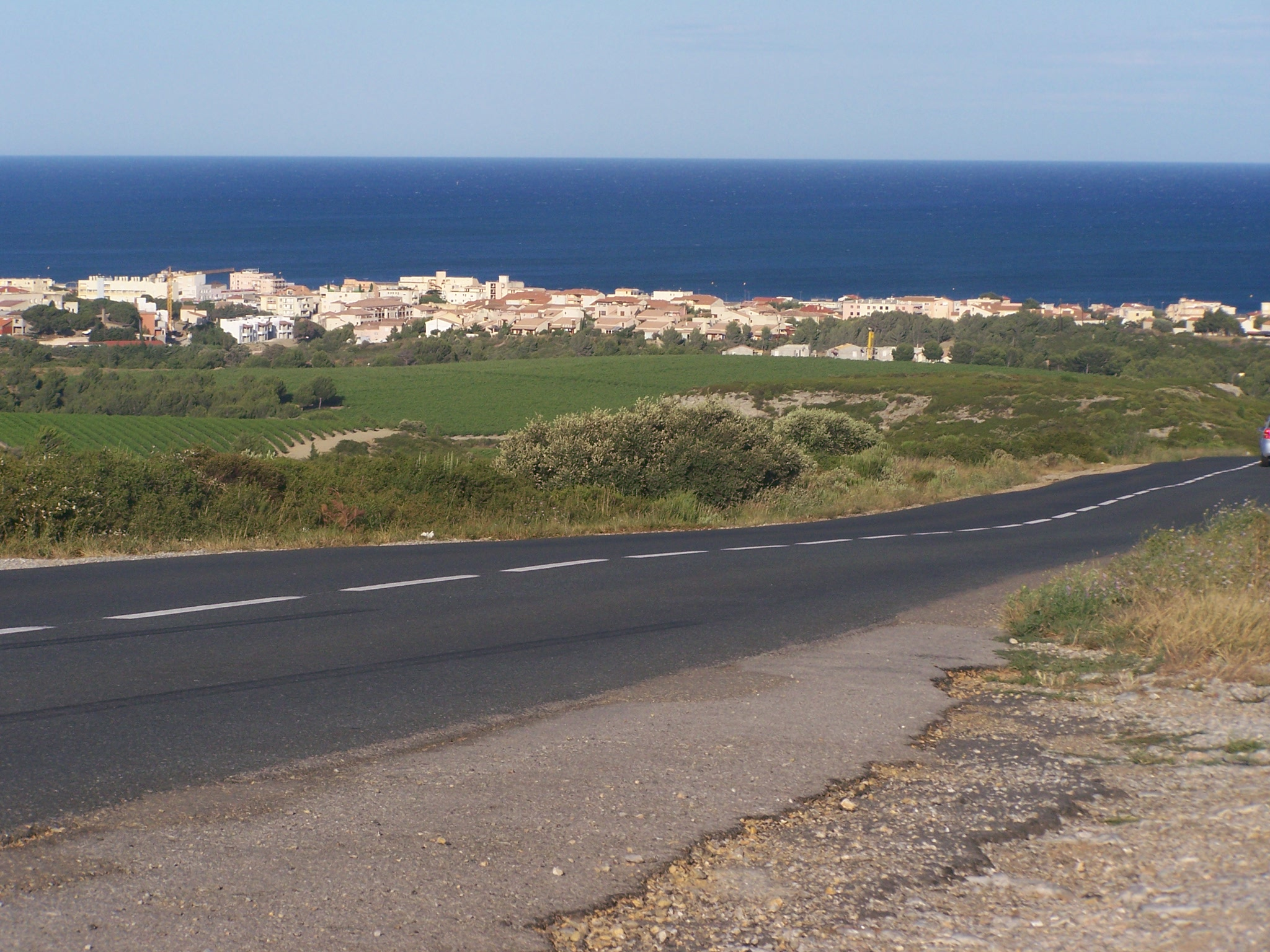
The resort as seen from the massif de la Clape when arriving from Narbonne

The seaside resort of Narbonne-Plage is located in the Aude department, on the Mediterranean coast, about 15 kilometres (9.3 mi) east of the city of Narbonne, of which it is a part. The town is located about 10 kilometres (6.2 mi) northeast of the center of Gruissan. It also borders the seaside resort of Saint-Pierre-la-Mer to the north (a resort belonging to the municipality of Fleury); the boundary is marked at the harbour.

Narbonne-Plage is situated in the Cathar Country within the Narbonnaise en Méditerranée Regional Natural Park, and its beaches and surrounding natural environment are therefore protected.

Located in the heart of the Gulf of Lion, the resort stretches along nearly 5 kilometres (3.1 mi) of fine sandy beach and remains in a largely wild and unspoiled area.

=== Climate ===
Narbonne-Plage has a Mediterranean climate with contrasting seasons. Summers are hot and very dry, while autumns alternate between thunderstorms and torrential rain (Mediterranean episodes), and winters are mild and wet. The Tramontane (a cold, dry northwesterly wind), also known locally as the Cers, is a frequent and strong wind.

=== Accessibility and transport ===
The resort is separated from Narbonne by the Massif de la Clape, a desert-like massif that makes it easily accessible via a single road, the D168 (photo above).

In terms of rail service, the nearest station is Narbonne station, from which intercity bus and coach services (TAN free shuttle during the summer) are available. The nearest airport is Béziers Cap d'Agde Airport, located 40 kilometres (25 mi) away.

== History ==
From the beginning of the 20th century, seaside tourism began to develop along the Languedoc coast. Following the establishment of places like La Franqui and Port-la-Nouvelle, facilities began to appear on the site of present-day Narbonne-Plage. The seaside resort was truly created under the leadership of Louis Madaule, then mayor of Narbonne between 1948 and 1956, and the direction of René Funel, head of the city's technical services. Its development intensified further in the 1960s.

== Resort ==
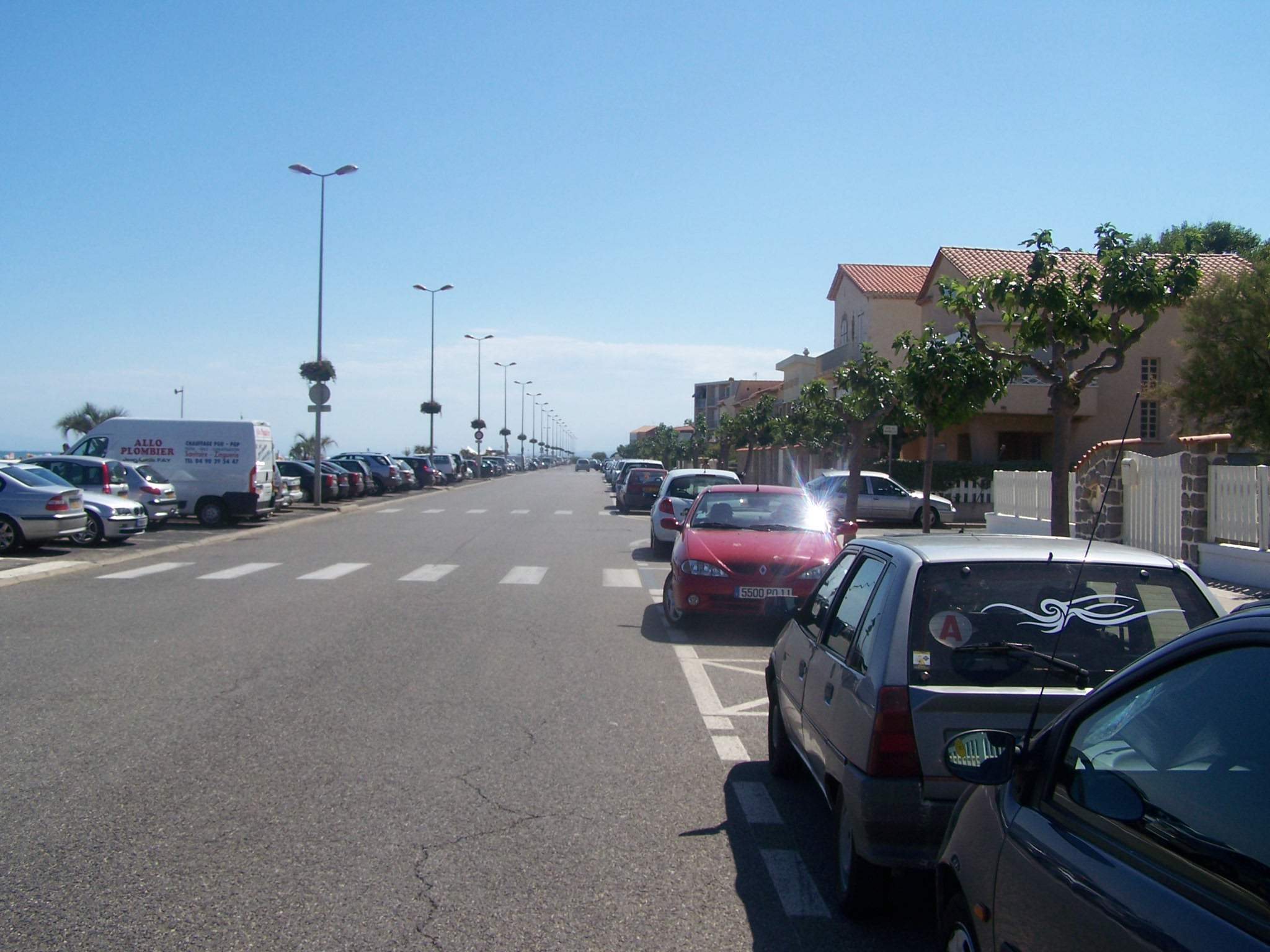
The seafront boulevard

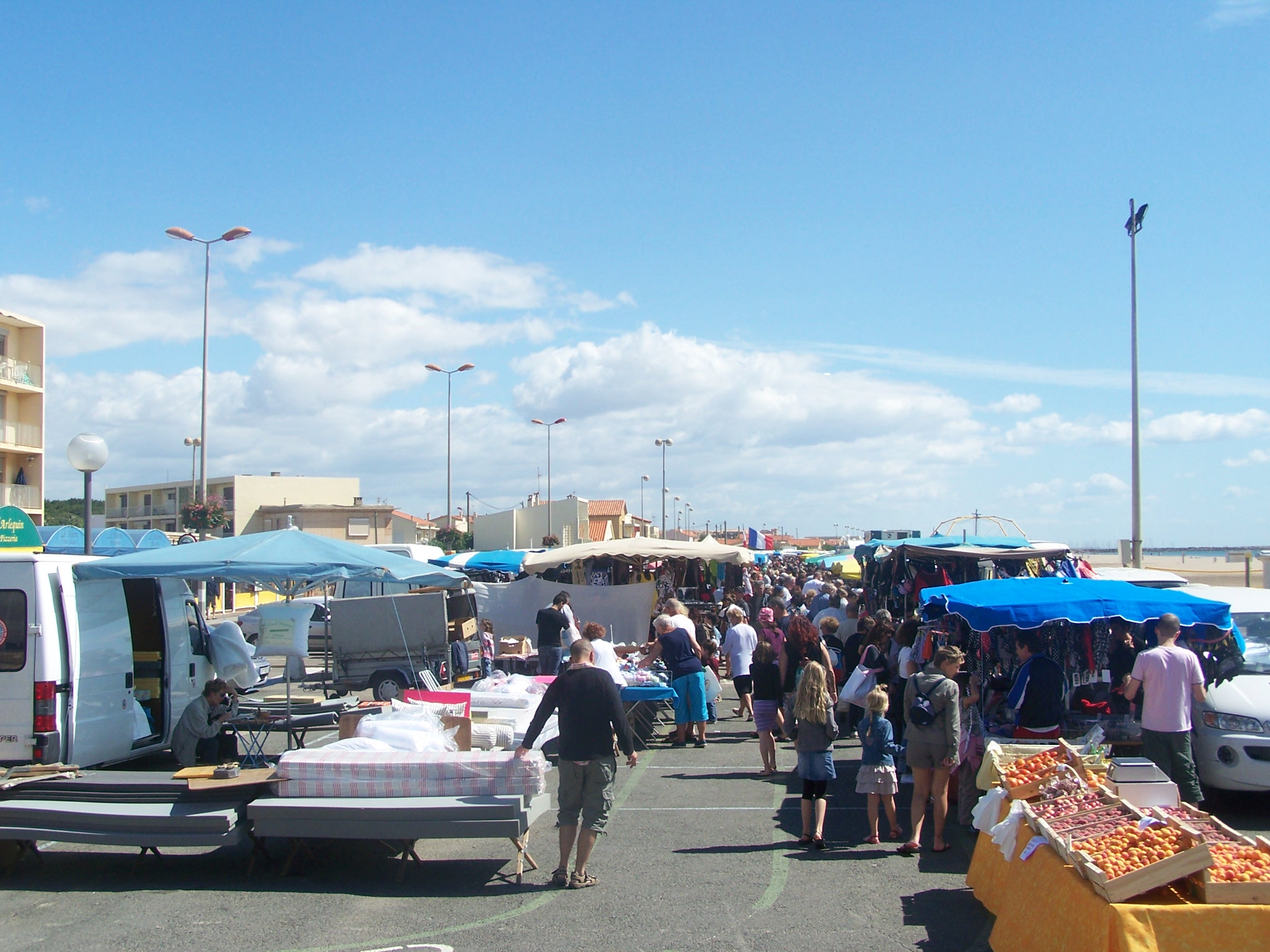
The daily market of local producers extends along the entire seafront

Today, the resort of Narbonne-Plage stretches for nearly 5 kilometres (3.1 mi) along the seafront, extending inland for a maximum of 1 kilometre (0.62 mi). A major road and pedestrian thoroughfare runs alongside the beach (Boulevard du Front de Mer and then Avenue du Port), as does a cycle path.

The resort consists primarily of apartment buildings and houses, rented out during the summer season. Its year-round population of 1,200 residents swells to nearly 30,000 during the summer.

In total, there are 232 rooms in 3-star hotels, 373 rooms in 2-star hotels, 820 rooms in unclassified accommodations, and over 2,000 camping pitches.

=== Activities and entertainment ===
During the summer, numerous activities and events are organized. At the port, there is a sailing school and a diving club. Other outdoor activities and events are also organised, such as the chess festival and surf fishing competitions.

Various facilities also make it possible to enjoy water sports or leisure activities: Base Navalia, the EVASPORT center, tennis courts, a swimming pool, pétanque courts, etc.

During the summer season (from 1 July to 31 August), every evening (except Sundays), shows and entertainment are organized on the seafront, including dancing, karaoke, concerts, balls, and cabaret evenings.

Also during the summer, Narbonne-Plage hosts various craft and gourmet markets on its seafront, where local artisans showcase and sell their products to holidaymakers.

=== Beach ===
The beach at Narbonne-Plage stretches for 5 kilometres (3.1 mi) in length and is around 100 metres (330 ft) wide, providing ample space for various team sports such as volleyball. The beach is supervised during the day during the summer season and access is free. It also has outdoor showers. It has been awarded the European Blue Flag label since 1988.

=== Marina ===
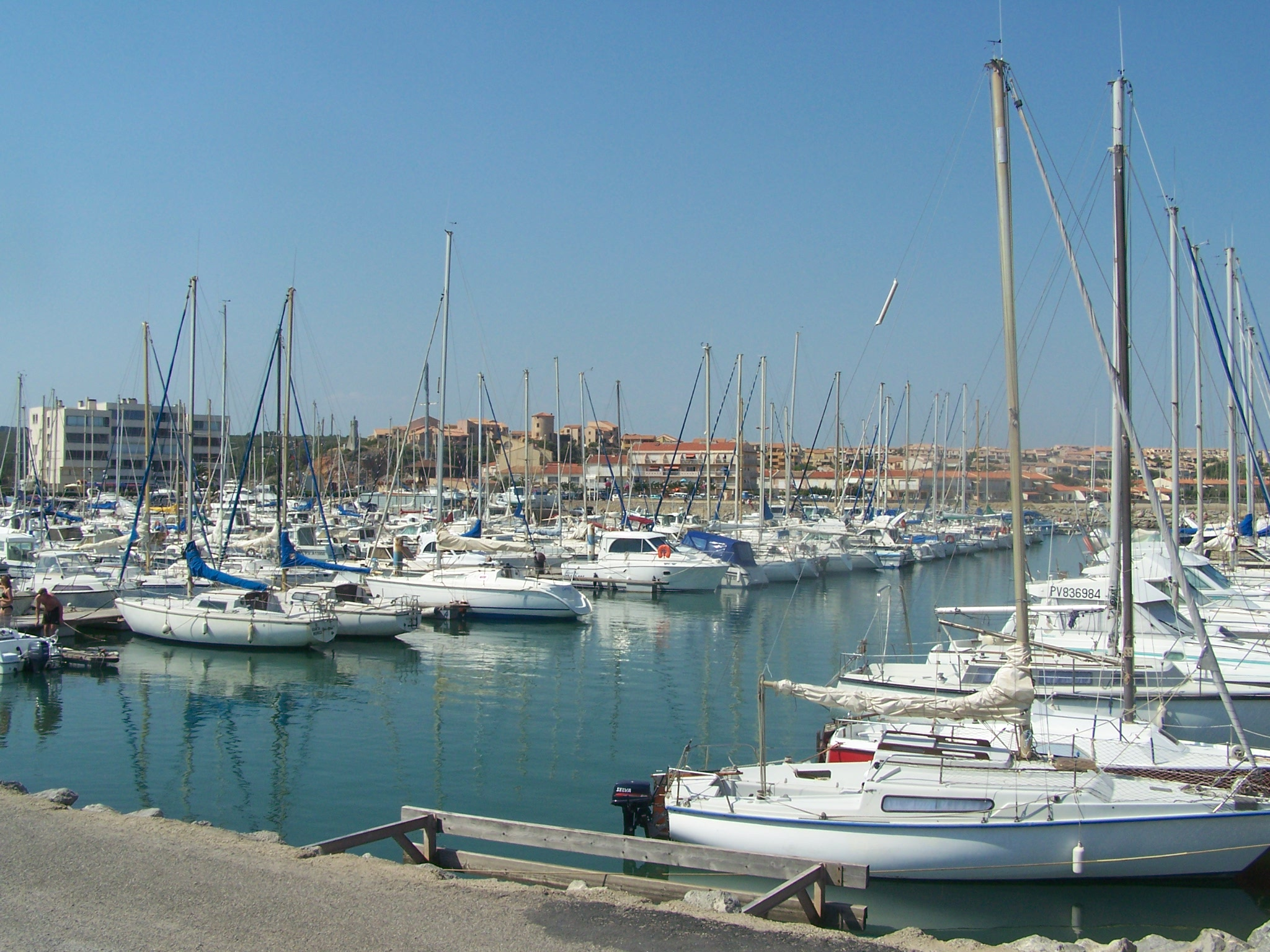
Marina with the resort of Saint-Pierre-la-Mer in the distance

Narbonne-Plage is also known for its large marina marking the northeastern end of the resort with Saint-Pierre-la-Mer. With a capacity of 600 berths, it was built between 1981 and 1986, and has also obtained the "Clean Ports" label since 2001.
