= Pech Maho =

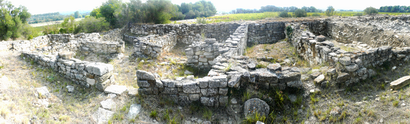
Views from the base of some houses in Pech Maho after update by the excavation work (2009)

Pech Maho oppidum is located in the town of Sigean, Aude, France. The last season of excavations on the archaeological site since 2004 has identified most of the walls and the habitats of a pre-Roman oppidum, particularly highlighting the latter stages of occupation of this site before its definitive abandonment.

Pech Maho was a fortified trading post occupied from the sixth century BC to the third century BC. There are observed three successive occupations, apparently discontinuous, presumably by a people called Elisycs (Ἐλισύκοι ων-Greek) installed at the limit of Iberians, Celts and Ligures. The site seems to be a commercial crossroads between Etruscans, Greeks, Carthaginians, and the indigenous people. The almost total destruction of the oppidum occurred at the end of the third century BC and may be linked with the Second Punic War who opposed Rome and Carthage. This war resulted in the control by Rome of eastern Iberian peninsula and western Languedoc. The catapult bullets found in the levels of destruction of the oppidum would be probative evidence. The excavations have also revealed traces of funerary rituals and animal sacrifices mixing cremation of human remains. These celebrations were probably held in honor of fallen heroes by the people who returned shortly after the destruction of the oppidum. Then the site would have received a few visits during the following decades before being completely forgotten. This period coincides with the establishment in the region of the Romans, who made Narbonne their prefecture since they will dominate Gallia Narbonensis.

== Location ==
The oppidum is located on a low (29m) hill on the bank of the Berre, a small coastal river. When established it was located near the mouths of the Aude and Berre, the ford of the Heraclean Lane, which then joined Italy to Iberia. The oppidum was directly on the shore of a navigable body of water with access to the sea, and not a lagoon separated by dry land as currently. It stood on a hill, providing defence, and was linked to trade routes.

Location : 43°02′44.45″N 2°57′22.4″E

== Discovery and excavations ==
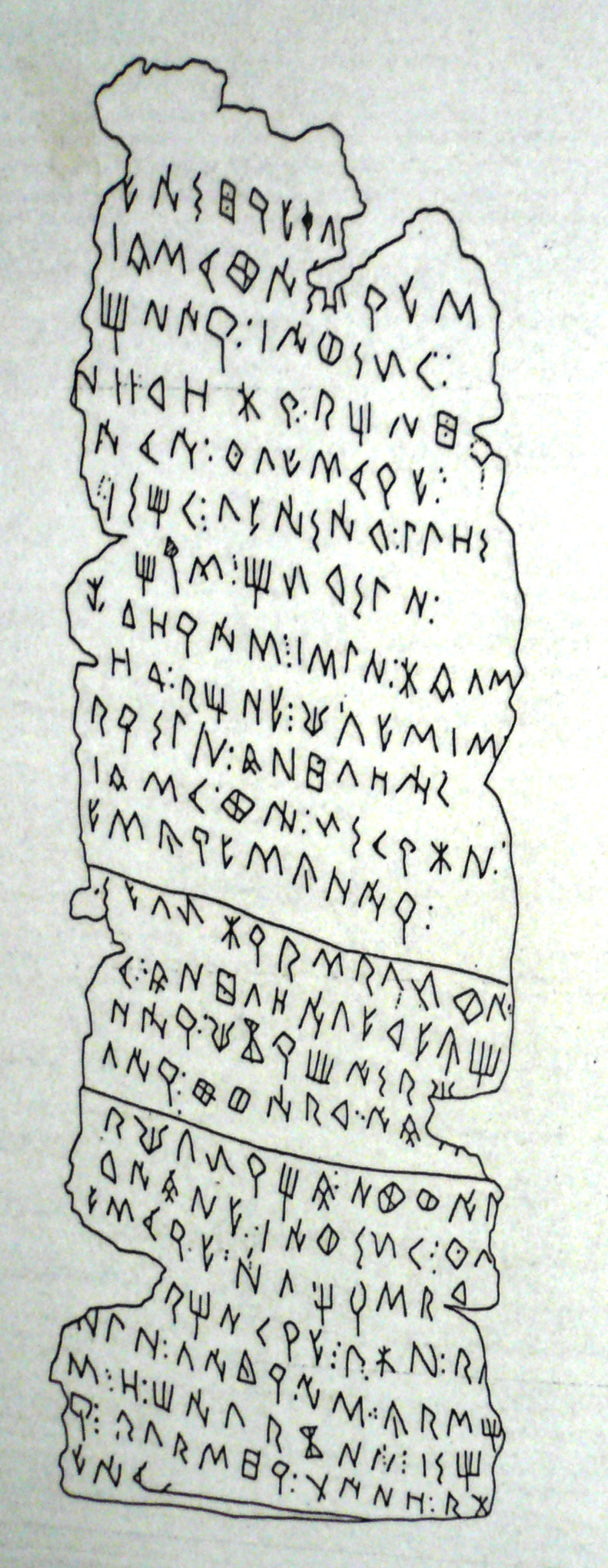
Transcription of an inscription found in the excavations, Musée de Sigean.

The site was discovered in 1913. Its name is contemporary, the ancient name is unknown. The excavations were conducted from 1948 to 1957 (J. Campardou) from 1959 to 1974 (Y. Solier) and again since 1998 (Gailledrat, Solier). The excavations are planned until 2010. In Sigean there is a museum that brings together collections from these excavations. The site is not freely accessible to the public. It can be visited with a guide, beginning at the museum on the last Saturday of the month, off season, on Wednesday morning in July and August and on demand.

Pech Maho has been listed since 1961 as a monument historique by the French Ministry of Culture. It was acquired by the State in 1968.
