= Massif de la Clape =

French mountain range

- Topographic map of the Massif de la Clape

Highest point
- Peak: Pech Redon
- Elevation: 214 m (702 ft)
- Coordinates: 43°09′30″N 3°06′00″E

Dimensions
- Length: 17 km (11 mi)
- Width: 8 km (5.0 mi)
- Area: 150 km^{2} (58 mi^{2})

Geography
- Country: France
- Region: Occitania
- Department: Aude
- Parent range: Chaîne pyrénéo-provençale

Geology
- Rock type: Limestone

The Massif de la Clape or Montagne de la Clape, is a small limestone mountain range on the French Mediterranean coast. It covers 15,000 hectares (37,000 acres) and is located in the department of Aude in Occitanie. It lies between the city of Narbonne and the sea. Besides Narbonne, the towns of Armissan, Vinassan, and Fleury are located along its edges, as well as Saint-Pierre-la-Mer, Narbonne-Plage, and Gruissan on the coast. The name derives from the Occitan word "clapas", which means "rocky scree slope" or "pile of pebbles."

The massif is about 17 kilometres (11 mi) long from southwest to northeast and about 8 kilometres (5.0 mi) wide from northwest to southeast. It provides the highest elevations on the mostly flat coast between the Rhône estuary (Camargue) and the Pyrenees. Several peaks reach over 200 metres (660 ft) and are thus higher than the hill overlooking Sète, Mont Saint-Clair at 175 metres (574 ft), and the hill overlooking Agde at 111 metres (364 ft). The highest point of the Massif de la Clape is Pech Redon at 214 metres (702 ft). Due to its height, a radar station of the French military has been located on the Plan de Roques at an altitude of 200 m since 1965, from where it monitors the country and part of the western Mediterranean. The massif lies within the Parc naturel régional de la Narbonnaise en Méditerranée.

== Geography ==
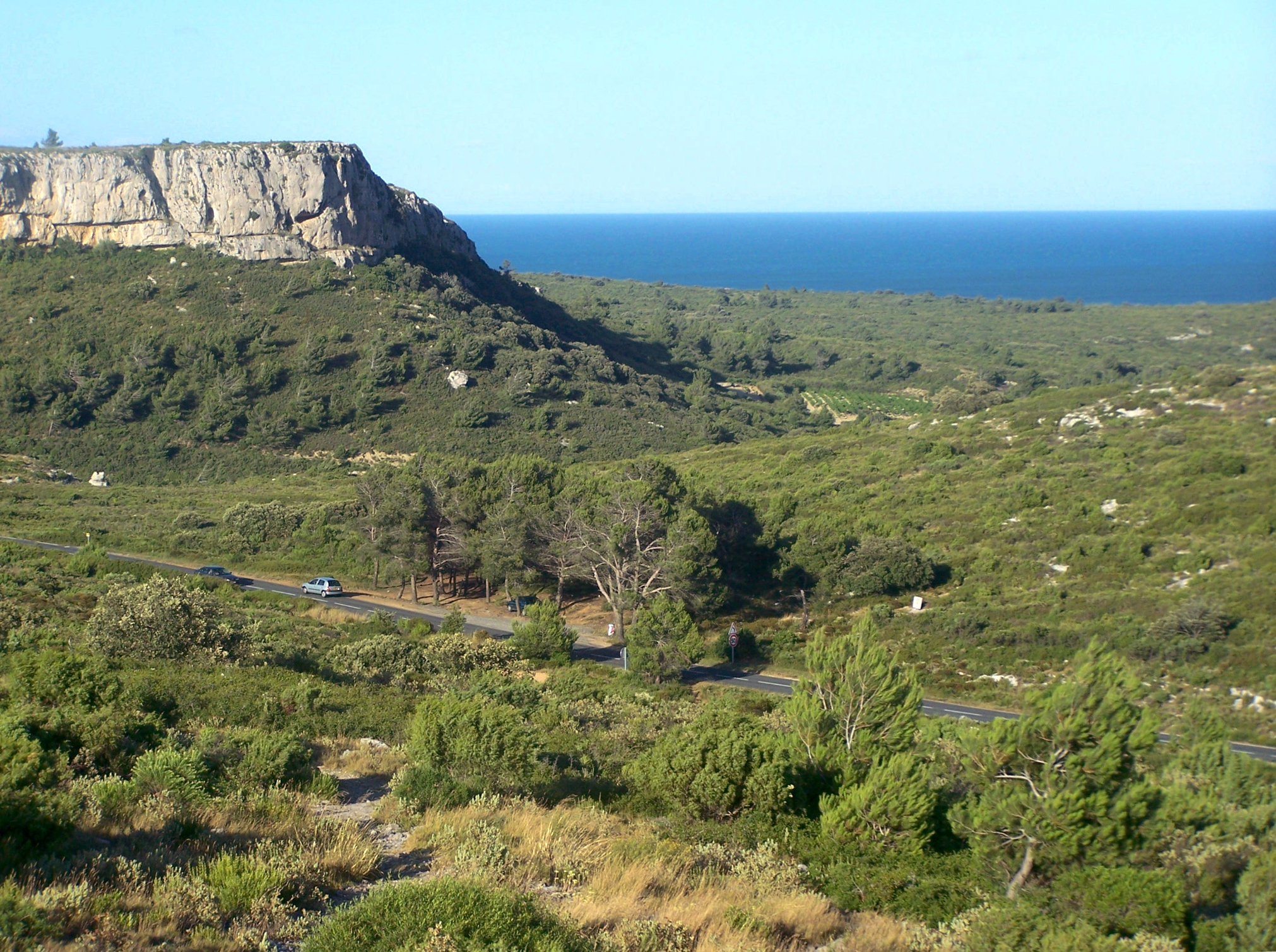
View of the edge of the Massif de la Clape near Narbonne-Plage

=== Geology ===
The rocks are primarily Lower Cretaceous limestones, exhibiting the characteristics of an Urgonian limestone. The Clape massif was once an island, connected to the mainland around the 14th century by the accumulation of alluvium from the Aude.

The massif consists of karst and is therefore very permeable. There are no permanent surface waters, but numerous underground streams emerge at springs, which have enabled the establishment of farms in almost all valleys. The approximately 600 millimetres (24 in) of annual rainfall - making it one of the driest areas in France - fall mainly in autumn, while summer is dry. High temperatures and strong winds such as the Cers cause significant evaporation, estimated at 948 millimetres (37.3 in) per year. The importance of moist sea air for vegetation, depending on the wind direction, is difficult to determine but is also significant.

==== Gouffre de l'Œil Doux ====
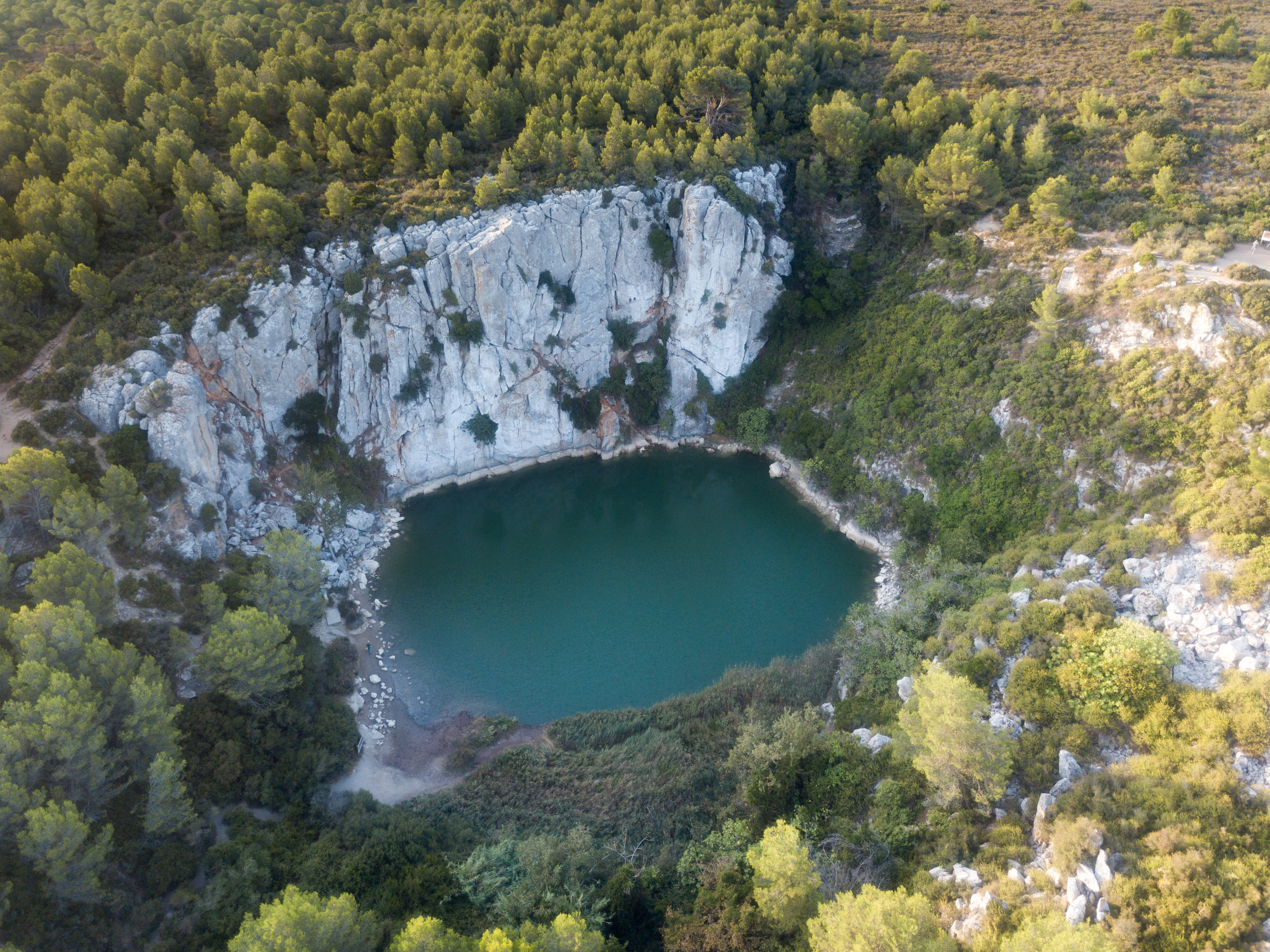
The limestone sinkhole Gouffre de l'Œil Doux

A geological feature lies north of Saint-Pierre-la-Mer, the "gouffre de l'Œil Doux". Literally translated from French, this would mean "abyss of the sweet eye," but the name actually derives from the Occitan "Uèlh Dotz". The term "eye" here refers to an opening, while "dotz" means spring or channel, together roughly translating to "opening to the spring." This approximately circular opening, with a diameter of about 64 metres (210 ft), is a geological structure typical of karst and is known as a cenote or sinkhole. It reveals the groundwater level, which can vary considerably at the Œil Doux, partly due to its connection with the sea. Therefore, the water is brackish.

The Gouffre de l'Œil Doux was first placed under protection in 1949. In 1978, the surrounding area, comprising 88.36 hectares (218.3 acres), was added, before most of the massif was protected in later years.

=== Climate ===
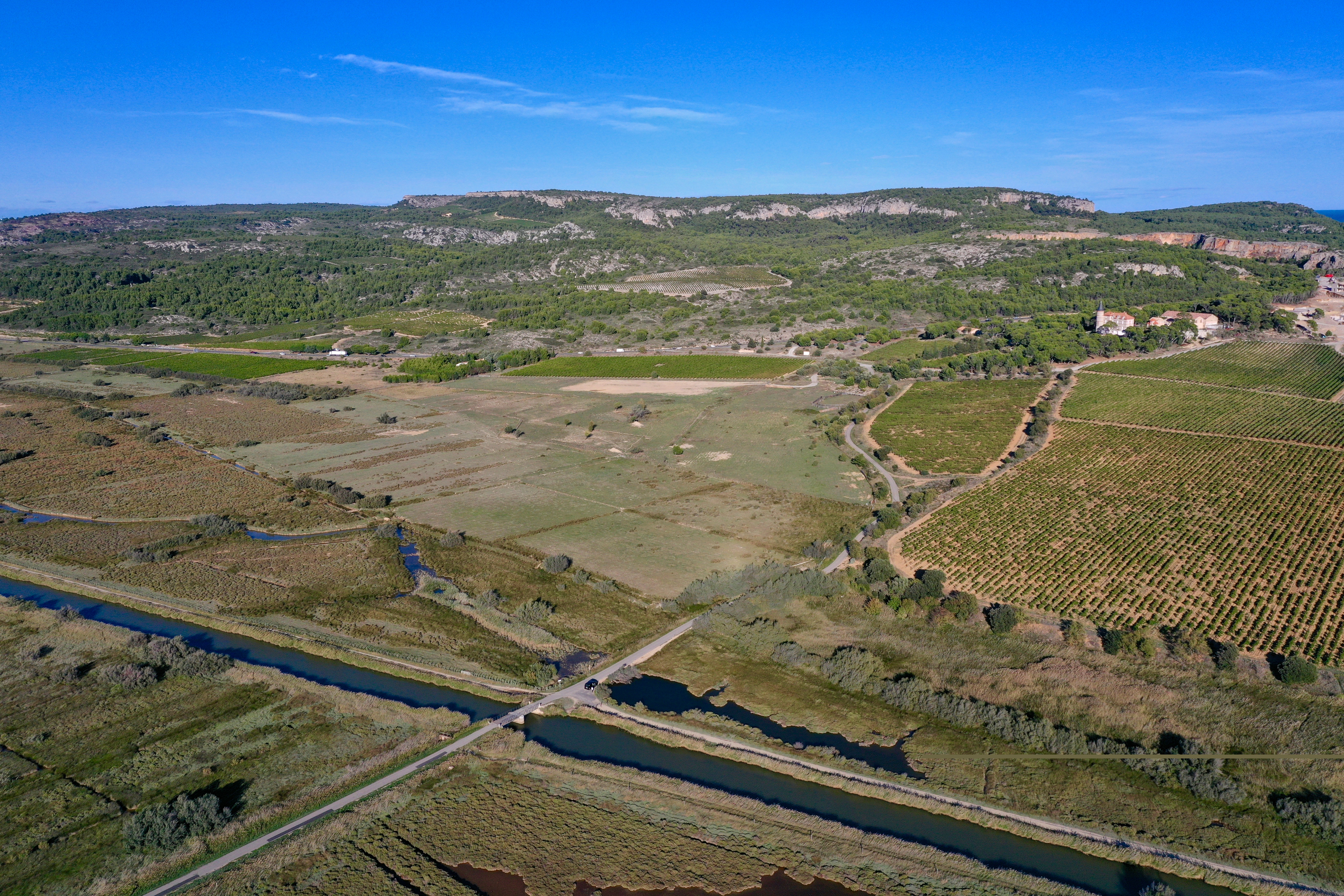
Aerial view showing the massif and surrounding flatter land

The climate is Mediterranean. It sees low rainfall and up to 3000 hours of sunlight per year.

The massif, which runs roughly north-south, is exposed to two strong winds: the Cers and the Marin. The Cers is a dry, fresh wind from the northeast; it originates in the depression between the northern foothills of the Pyrenees and the southern foothills of the Massif Central. This depression connects the area around Toulouse to the Mediterranean coast via the Seuil de Naurouze, Castelnaudary, and Carcassonne; the Canal du Midi and, more recently, the Autoroute des Deux Mers run through this area. The Cers blows through this corridor towards the Mediterranean, striking the topography of the Massif de la Clape, sometimes with enough force to uproot large trees on the massif's steep slopes with flat soils. The "Circius" was already mentioned by Roman writers, such as Seneca in 62 AD and Pliny the Elder in his Naturalis Historia (around 77 AD). The latter wrote that the Circius wind was unsurpassed in strength by any other wind. Seneca mentions a temple built in the city of Narbonne for the god Anemoi, where the residents gave thanks for the healthy skies he brought.

While the Cers brings clear skies, the Marin does the opposite: it blows in the opposite direction, from the sea towards Toulouse, and it brings very humid air with it. Low clouds can dump hundreds of litres of rain in just a few hours.

=== Flora and fauna ===
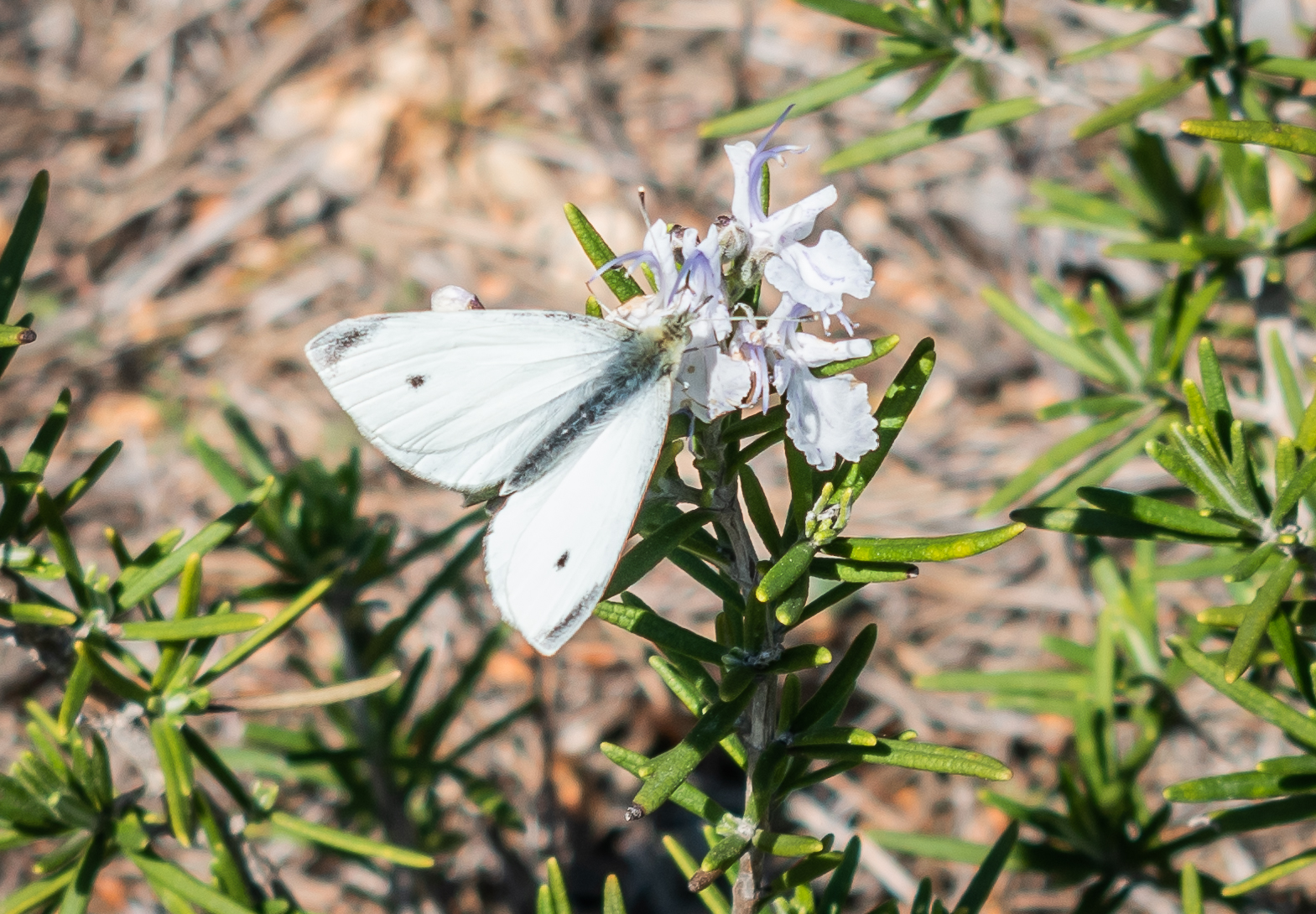
Pieris rapae butterfly found in Massif de la Clape

Garrigue vegetation, forests, and vineyards are present to a significant extent. The mountain range is largely covered with kermes oaks and Aleppo pines. The cornflower is a plant endemic to the Clape massif in the commune of Gruissan.

The knapweed Centaurea corymbosa, known in French as "Centaurée de la Clape," occurs exclusively at six locations in the Massif de la Clape. It is likely in an "evolutionary dead end"; Therefore, its chances of survival are considered limited. Other notable plants include bumblebee orchid, shrubby germander, prickly juniper, and Phoenician juniper. False brome is typical of the garrigue sheep pastures, and Aleppo pine is typical of the forests.

Above Gruissan is the nesting site of a Bonelli's eagle (Aquila fasciata), one of only about thirty remaining in France (as of 2017). The common bent-wing bat uses various caves in the massif. In addition, the lesser kestrel, European roller, and eagle owl are present. 9,202 hectares (22,740 acres) of the massif are designated as a Natura 2000 site.

== History ==
La Clape was an island: Lykia, for Phoenician navigators, which was known as Insula Laci by the Romans because of its many lakes; the Romans began to cultivate vines there. In the Middle Ages, the alluvial deposits of the Aude river, by filling in part of the ponds, connected it to the mainland and it became a peninsula. At the end of the Middle Ages, as it lost its insular character, intensive deforestation – whether for cultivation, the expansion of pastures or the production of firewood and construction timber – gave it a desert-like appearance.

=== Formation of the massif and fossil finds ===
Around 45 million years ago, a thrust of the Pyreneo-Provençal chain caused the massif to shift by several dozen kilometers, separating it from the Corbières mountain range. It consists of Mesozoic sedimentary rocks (251–65 million years old) overlain by younger strata. Steep slopes and cliffs alternate with high plateaus, and several gorges traverse the area. This makes the landscape attractive to free climbers. Besides a climbing garden, there are over 300 climbing routes in the massif.

In 1828, Adolphe Brongniart described an Oligocene fossil site near Armissan. Dating to approximately 30 million years ago was achieved using certain fish species found there. In 1866, Gaston de Saporta published a list of plant fossils found at the site. In 1896, Albert Gaudry expressed his enthusiasm for the diverse plant fossils, including 30 centimetres (12 in) long Aralia leaves, acacia pods, and leaves and fruits of Anœctomeria, a genus of water lilies.

=== Early settlement in the Grotte de la Crouzade ===
The oldest traces of settlement in the massif were found in the "grotte de la Crouzade," a cave located above Gruissan, which was placed under monument protection as early as 1928. The cave entrance faces west, behind a large forecourt. The cave is essentially a tall, long chamber, 75 meters in length. The height gradually decreases towards the rear; it was discovered in 1866, and the first excavations took place in 1874. The earliest identifiable finds, about 50,000 years old, were attributed to the Mousterian culture, i.e., Neanderthals, whose bone remains were found mixed with those of prey animals. During a 17,000-year hiatus, sediments without any finds were deposited. From the following period, two skull fragments of modern humans were found, which are among the oldest in Western Europe. Radiocarbon dating of a jawbone fragment dated it to 32,700 BC. The flint and bone tools found there allow it to be attributed to the Aurignacian period. After a further gap, finds dating back 25,000 years can be attributed to the Gravettian period, before Magdalenian artifacts appear 10,000 years later. The post-glacial Azilian culture also left behind finds.

The cave was closed to the public in the early 1990s to protect the bats living there.

=== Siltation of the former island in historical times ===
In Roman times, the massif was not part of the mainland but an island called "insula laci," island of the lake. The Aude River had two distributaries flowing into the Mediterranean. The upper distributary, similar to the present-day Aude, flowed northeast of the massif into the extensive Étang de Vendres. The lower distributary flowed into the "Lacus Rubresus," a lagoon that stretched south of Narbonne between the massif and the Corbières mountains. The port of Narbonne was connected to this distributary by a canal. Large parts of the Lacus Rubresus have now silted up; the Étang de Bages et de Sigean, between Narbonne and Port-la-Nouvelle in the south, is the largest remaining vestige.

The Aude's floodplain expanded as early as the first century, but the massif remained an island throughout the Middle Ages. In 978, the village of Armissan, located west of the massif, was recorded as being situated on a bay of the Lacus Rubresus. In 1316, a flood that also devastated the city of Narbonne shifted the main course of the Aude River to the north of the massif. At the end of the 16th century, the consuls of Narbonne decided to drain the unhealthy marshes on the western side of the massif, towards the city, which had developed due to increasing silting. This helped to connect the former island to the mainland and create new arable land.

However, it is not possible to determine exactly when the transition from island to peninsula and finally to mainland occurred. As late as 1688, Pierre de Marca wrote in his Marca Hispanica of an island, the Insula Laci, bordered by lagoons to the west and the sea to the east. The names Insula Laci, île de Licci, Lec or Licti on the one hand and la Clape on the other were used in parallel from at least 1322 until the end of the 18th century.

== Agriculture ==
Today, 16% of the massif's area is used for agriculture, 93% of which is dedicated to viticulture.

=== Viticulture ===
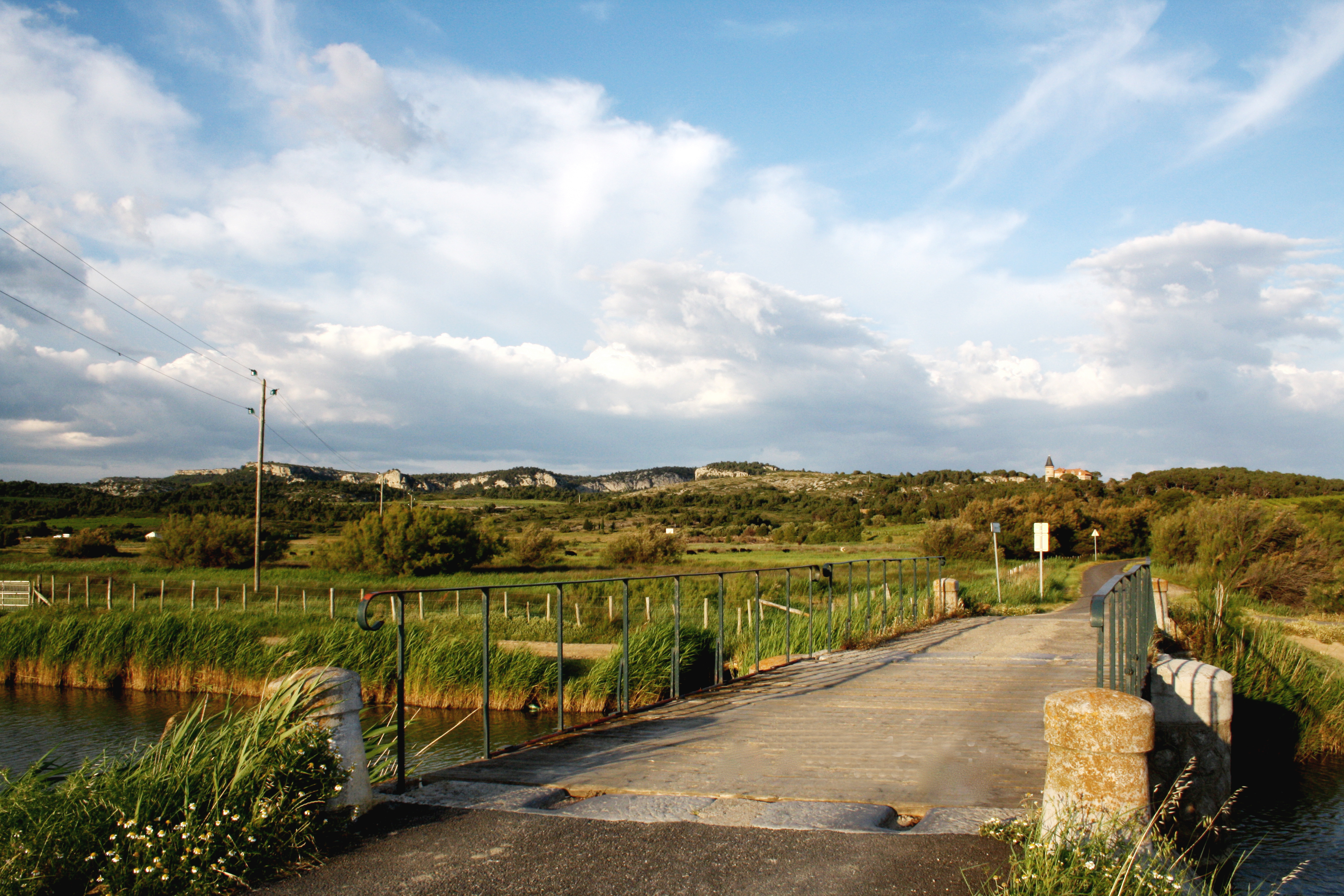
Vineyard in the La Clape AOC

Viticulture (winegrowing) is the main agricultural activity in the massif. Most of it, in the northeast and centre, falls within the La Clape appellation. Another small area in the southwest, within the municipality of Gruissan, is also part of the Corbières AOC. Numerous wine estates are located in the massif. There is also an INRA experimental viticulture station.

The exact date when viticulture began in the massif is unknown. Records from 1678 indicate that an estate belonging to the Knights of Malta, Céleyran, was instructed to establish a new vineyard of 12 sétérées (approximately 3 hectares (7.4 acres)). A century later, the vineyard at the Saint-Pierre-la-garrigue branch was expanded by 16 sétérées.

The wine region was part of the Coteaux du Languedoc, which was incorporated into the Appellation d’Origine Protégée (AOP) du Languedoc. The AOC La Clappe classification was introduced in 1985. It was later renamed AOP La Clape. AOP La Clape encompasses the La Clape massif, excluding the town of Gruissan. This belongs to the Corbières AOP, which is otherwise located on the other side of the Étang de Bages et de Sigean in the Corbières region. Approximately 40 wineries are located in the massif.

768 hectares (1,900 acres) of vineyards belong to the La Clape AOP, producing about 25,000 hectolitres (550,000 imp gal; 660,000 US gal) per year, less than 40 liters per hectare, and thus significantly less than permitted. Wine from approximately 3,000 additional hectares is marketed as IGP Languedoc. This designation has fewer restrictions regarding the amount of wine that may be produced per hectare.

One of the largest wineries, the 82-hectare (200-acre) l'Hospitalet, belongs to former rugby player Gérard Bertrand, who also owns other estates with a total area of 600 hectares (1,500 acres).

=== Figs, kermes, samphire and olives ===
Fig trees are scattered across the massif. They were formerly planted alongside grapevines, almond trees, and peach trees. A parasite, the kermes scale insect, lives on the numerous kermes oak trees in the massif. The dye kermes was formerly extracted from these scale insects. Children and women collected the insects, yielding between 0.5 and 1 kilogram per day. This practice has been carried out since at least the 13th century; the earliest written record of La Clape dates from 1260. Production ceased with the advent of carmine, derived from the Central American cochineal insect, and the deforestation of La Clape.

A description from 1776 notes that the area was largely uncultivated, consisting of garrigue and pastureland. However, it also mentions quite good vineyards on the slopes.

The cultivation and processing of glasswort (Salicornia), used for the production of glass and white soap, had some financial significance, at least in the 18th and early 19th centuries.

Olive cultivation has played a role in the coastal region of Languedoc since Roman times. With a significant increase around 1450, it became a major economic focus. The decline of olive cultivation began around 1689, exacerbated by a severe frost in 1709. It is likely that this also applied to La Clape. In the winter of 1956, temperatures again plummeted to an extremely unusual −20 °C (−4 °F) for the region. This destroyed 95% of all olive groves. Today, only a few olive growers remain active in the Massif de la Clape, cultivating a negligible area.

=== Sheep farming ===
While cattle were rare, sheep farming was once widespread. Both secular and ecclesiastical rulers, such as the Archbishop of Narbonne, owned property in the Massif de la Clape, where sheep were also kept. Sheep farming developed particularly for its wool, as Narbonne was one of the most important cloth-making centers in Languedoc at the turn of the 13th and 14th centuries. Records show that in 1401, 900 animals were transported to La Clape from other regions. A map from 1548 shows a path leading animals to the pastures of La Clape. The same map depicts flocks grazing in the wetlands on the edge of La Clape.

Increased deforestation of the area began around 1760. As early as 1763, an author lamented that some landowners allowed farmers to bring shrubs to Narbonne, where these had long served as the sole food source for sheep. The number of sheep reached a peak at the end of the 18th century, a level never again attained. In 1821, there were 51 farms in La Clape. Records from that same year document efforts to cross Merino sheep, which yielded more wool, with local breeds. By 1866, the Céleyran estate had 1,200 Merino sheep. In 1874, a distinct sheep breed, the clapeng, is mentioned for La Clape. However, the still widespread sheep population was not to last. The phylloxera epidemic swept across much of France, but the Massif de la Clape remained unaffected. As a result, the focus of agriculture shifted from sheep farming to viticulture. In the 1970s, livestock farming, which was used for meat production and never for cheese production, disappeared completely because it was no longer financially viable. More recently, livestock farming may be increasing again. In 2015, a first flock of sheep was introduced near Fleury for ecological reasons. The sheep could graze on matted undergrowth, which poses a risk of forest fires starting and spreading.

== In popular culture ==
- In the film The Count of Monte Cristo (2024) in which Pierre Niney plays the main role, several scenes are filmed in the South of France, notably in the Massif de la Clape.

== See also ==
- La Clape and natural spaces - Gruissan
- Parc naturel régional de la Narbonnaise en Méditerranée
