= Cers (wind) =

The Cers, also called the Narbonnais by those who live southeast of Narbonne, is a very dry wind that is colder during the winter and warmer during the summer. Originating from moist Atlantic air-masses flowing across the Toulouse area, the Cers is intensified through the Lauragais gap. Cers winds are frequent across the Aude region in south-western France. Exceptionally red sunsets and lenticularis clouds usually herald the onset of the Cers. It is closely related to the Mistral, but the term Cers refers specifically to the very strong wind in the bas-Languedoc. The opposite to this wind type is the Marin, a south east wind which occurs across the Iberian Peninsula and the Aude region north of the Pyrenees.

== See also ==
- Tramontane
