= Narbonne =

Subprefecture and commune in Occitania, France

Narbonne Narbona (Occitan)
- Subprefecture and commune
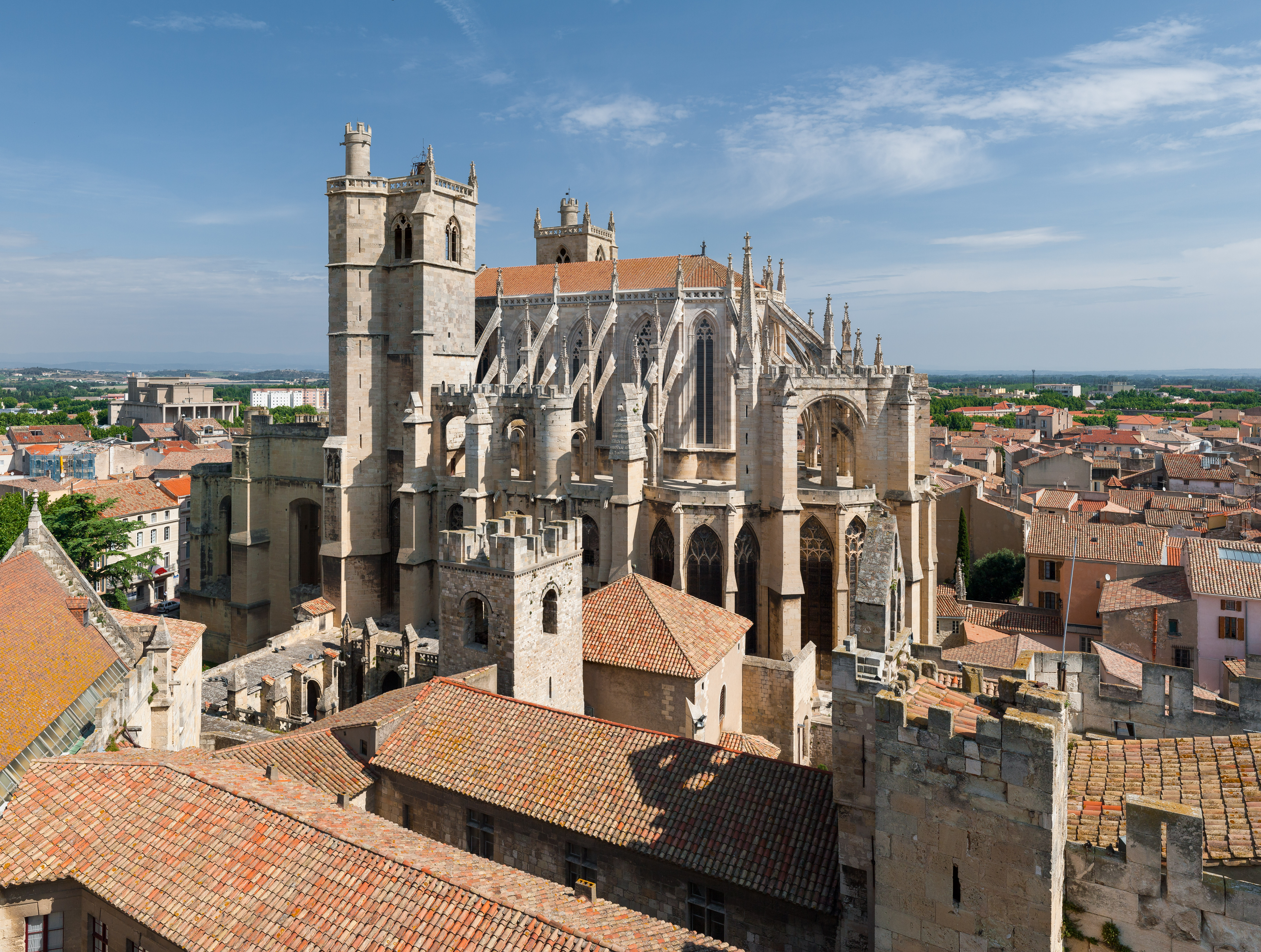
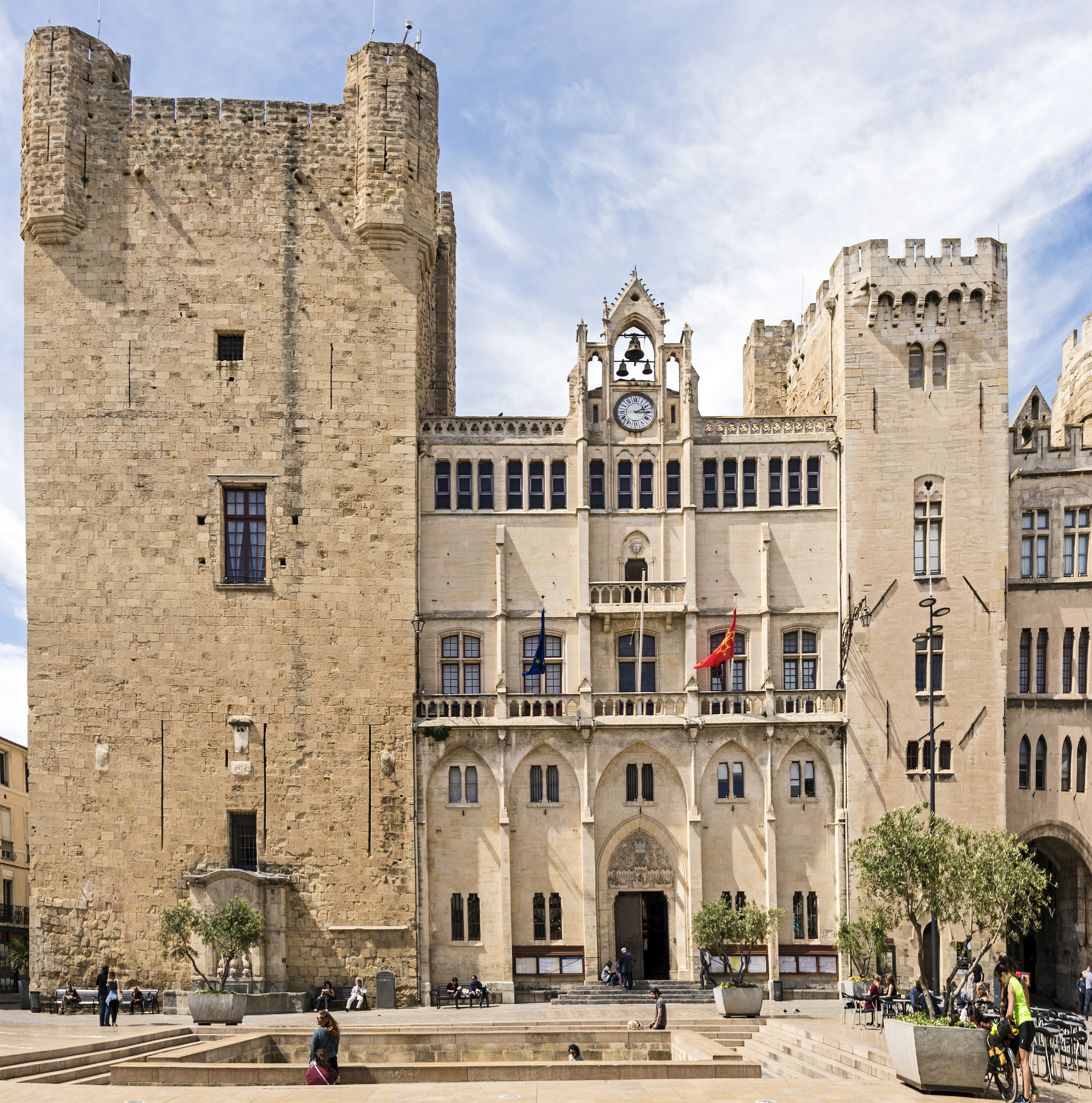
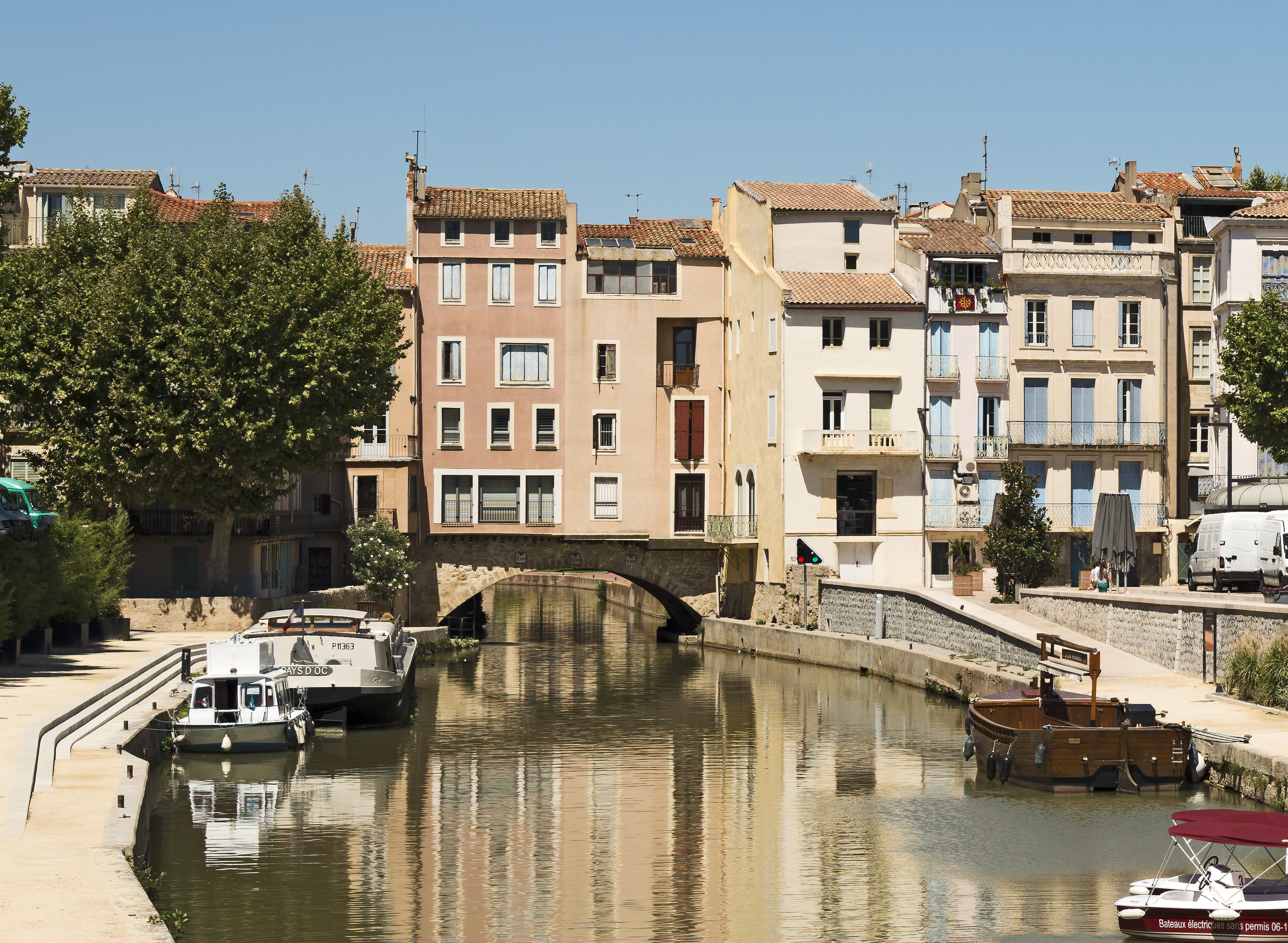
- Narbonne skyline with Narbonne Cathedral Archbishops' Palace Pont des Marchands

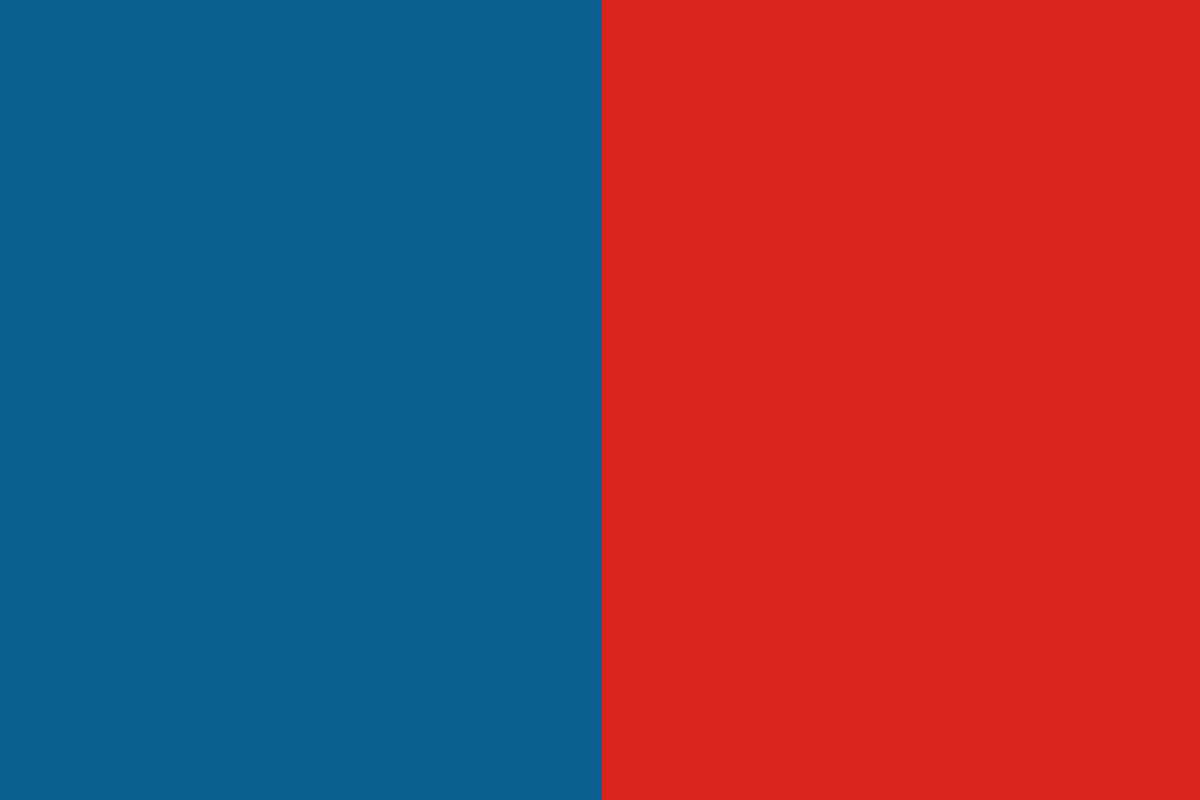
- Flag Coat of arms
- Location of Narbonne
- Location within France Location within Occitanie
- Coordinates: 43°11′01″N 3°00′15″E
- Country: France
- Region: Occitania
- Department: Aude
- Arrondissement: Narbonne
- Canton: Narbonne-1, 2, and 3
- Intercommunality: Grand Narbonne

Government
  - Mayor (2023–2026): Bertrand Malquier
- Area^{1}: 172.96 km^{2} (66.78 sq mi)
- Highest elevation: 285 m (935 ft)
- Lowest elevation: 0 m (0 ft)
- Population (2023): 57,587
  - Density: 332.95/km^{2} (862.34/sq mi)
- Demonym(s): Narbonnese (En); Narbonnaise (Fr)
- Time zone: UTC+01:00 (CET)
  - Summer (DST): UTC+02:00 (CEST)
- INSEE/Postal code: 11262 /11100
- ^{1} French Land Register data, which excludes lakes, ponds, glaciers > 1 km^{2} (0.386 sq mi or 247 acres) and river estuaries.

Narbonne (/nɑːrˈbɒn/ nar-BON, US also /-ˈbɔːn, -ˈbʌn/ -BAWN, -BUN, French: [naʁbɔn]; Occitan: Narbona [naɾˈβunɔ]; Latin: Narbo [ˈna(ː)rboː]; Late Latin: Narbona) is a commune and subprefecture in Southern France, located in the Occitania region. It is located about 15 km (9 mi) from the shores of the Mediterranean Sea and was historically a prosperous port city. Narbonne lies 849 km (528 mi) from Paris in the Aude department, of which it is an arrondissement. From the 14th century onwards, it declined following a change in the course of the river Aude. While it is the largest commune in Aude, the capital of the Aude department is the smaller commune of Carcassonne.

== Etymology ==
The etymology of the town's original name, Narbo, is lost in antiquity, and it may have referred to a hillfort from the Iron Age close to the location of the current settlement or its occupants. The earliest known record of the area comes from the Ancient Greek historian and geographer Hecataeus of Miletus (5th century BCE), who identified it as a Celtic harbor and marketplace at that time, and called its inhabitants Ναρβαῖοι, although the French academics and philologists Edme Cougny and Henri Lebègue report that several other names were used in ancient times to refer to the town, its territory, and Celtic inhabitants in ancient Greek inscriptions.

== History ==
=== Under the Romans ===
The ancient city of Narbonne was established in Gaul by the Roman Republic in 118 BCE, as Colonia Narbo Martius, colloquially Narbo, and made into the capital of the newly established Roman province of Gallia Transalpina (modern-day Southwestern France). It was located on the Via Domitia, the first Roman road in Gaul, built at the time of the foundation of the colony, and connecting Italy to Spain. Geographically, Narbonne was therefore located at a very important crossroads because it was situated where the Via Domitia connected to the Via Aquitania, which led toward the Atlantic Ocean through the cities of Tolosa and Burdigala.

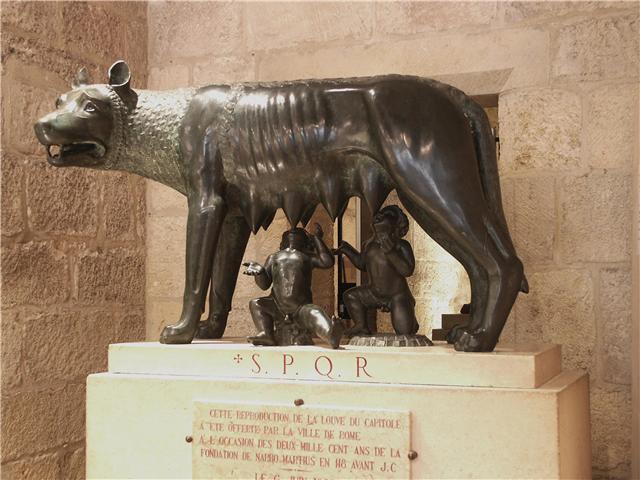
Bronze copy of the Capitoline Wolf donated by Rome to Narbonne in 1982 to commemorate two thousand years since the creation of the town.

The Roman colony of Narbo Martius was founded close to an older settlement: on the hill of Montlaurès, about 4 kilometers north of Narbonne, there was an oppidum that can be traced back to the 6th century BCE. Some scholars identify this settlement with Naro or Narbo, the capital of the Elisyces (Greek: Ἐλισύκοι; Latin: Elesyces), an ancient tribe of Ibero-Ligurian origin, mentioned both in Ancient Greek and Roman literary sources, that were Celticized before the Roman conquest of Gaul. However, this literary mention in Avienius' didactic poem Ora maritima did not occur until the late 4th century CE, and thus only about half a millennium after the founding of Narbo Martius. Other scholars consider the identification of the oppidum of Montlaurès with Naro or Narbo to be unproven.

Nearby the oppidum lies the lower course of the river Aude (Latin: Atax), which in Roman times still divided into two branches. The northern branch flowed further east, similar to the river's current course, to meet the Étang de Berre, a lagoon of the Mediterranean Sea north of the Massif de la Clape, while the southern branch followed the course of today's Canal de la Robine along the Roman colony of Narbo Martius, flowing into the lagoon south of it.

Politically, Narbonne gained importance as a competitor to Massilia (today Marseille). Julius Caesar settled veterans from his 10th Legion there and attempted to develop its port, while Massilia was supporting Pompey. Among the products of Narbonne, its rosemary-flower honey was famous among Romans. Later, the Roman province of Gallia Transalpina was renamed Gallia Narbonensis after the city, which became its capital. Seat of a powerful administration, the city enjoyed economic and architectural expansion. At that point, the city is thought to have had 30,000–50,000 inhabitants, and may have had as many as 100,000.

=== Visigothic Kingdom ===
According to Hydatius, in 462 AD the city was handed over to the Visigoths by a local military leader in exchange for support; as a result Roman rule ended in medieval France. It was subsequently the capital of the Visigothic Kingdom of Septimania, the only territory from Gaul to fend off the attacks of the Christian Franks after the Battle of Vouille (507). In 531, the Frankish king Childebert I invaded Septimania and defeated the Visigothic king, Amalaric, near Narbonne and occupied the city. However, after Childebert's continued invasion to Catalonia failed, Amalaric's successor Theudis was able to reclaim the rich province of Septimania, including Narbonne, to the Visigothic Kingdom.

=== Frankish conquest of Septimania ===
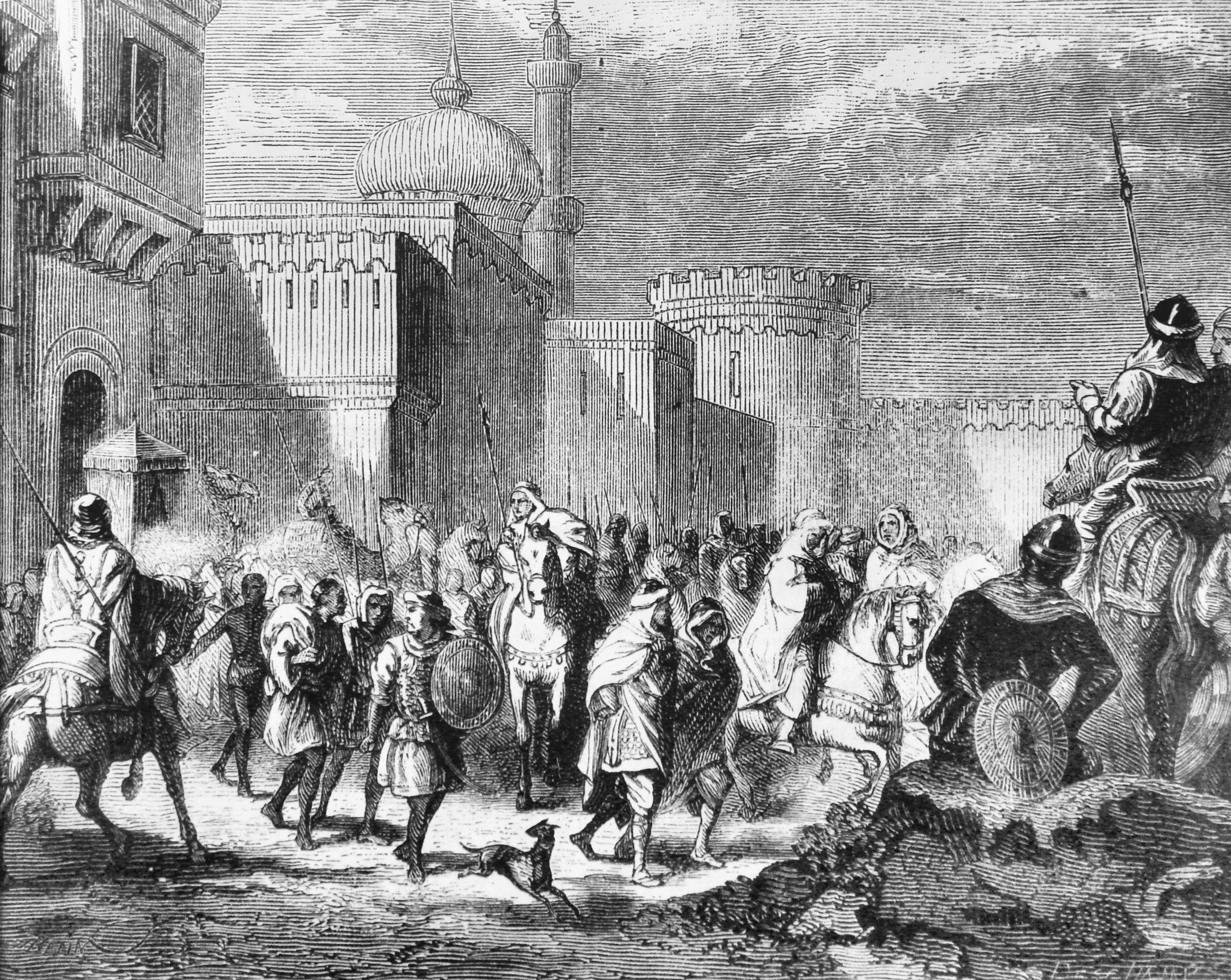
Arab and Berber Muslim troops retreating from Narbonne after the Frankish conquest of Septimania in 759. Illustration by Émile Bayard, 1880.

The region of Septimania was the last unconquered province of the Visigothic Kingdom. Arab and Berber Muslim forces began to campaign in Septimania in 719, as their incursion was motivated by the need to secure their territorial gains in Iberia. The region was invaded by the Andalusian Muslims in 719, renamed as Arbūnah and turned into a military base for future operations by the Andalusian military commanders. It passed briefly to the Emirate of Córdoba, which had been expanding from the south during the same century, before its subsequent conquest by the Christian Franks in 759, who by the end of the 9th century renamed it as Gothia or Marca Gothica ("Gothic March"). After the Frankish conquest of Narbonne in 759, the Muslim Arabs and Berbers were defeated by the Christian Franks and retreated to their Andalusian heartland, and the Carolingian king Pepin the Short came up reinforced.

=== Carolingian Empire ===
The Carolingian king Pepin the Short chased the Muslim Arabs and Berbers away from Septimania and conquered Narbonne in 759, after which the city became part of the Frankish Viscounty of Narbonne. The Frankish noble Bernat of Septimania was the ruler of these lands from 826 to 832. His career (he was beheaded in 844) characterized the turbulent 9th century in Septimania. His appointment as Count of Barcelona in 826 occasioned a general uprising of the Catalan lords (Bellonids) at this intrusion of Frankish power over the lands of Gothia. For suppressing Berenguer of Toulouse and the Catalans, Louis the Pious rewarded Bernat with a series of counties, which roughly delimit 9th-century Septimania: Narbonne, Agde, Béziers, Villeneuve-lès-Maguelone, Nîmes, and Uzès. Rising against Charles the Bald in 843, Bernat was apprehended at Toulouse and beheaded. Bernat's son, known as Bernat of Gothia, also served as Count of Barcelona and Girona, and as Margrave of Gothia and Septimania from 865 to 878.

The Frankish king found Septimania and the borderlands so devastated and depopulated by warfare, with the inhabitants hiding among the mountains, that he made grants of land that were some of the earliest identifiable fiefs to Visigothic and other refugees. Charlemagne founded several monasteries in Septimania, around which the people gathered for protection. Beyond Septimania to the southern border, Charlemagne established the Hispanic Marches in the borderlands of his empire. The territory passed to Louis the Stammerer, King of Aquitaine, but it was governed by Frankish margraves and then dukes from 817 onwards.

Septimania was a march of the Carolingian Empire and then West Francia down to the 13th century, though it was culturally and politically autonomous from the northern France-based central royal government. The region was under the influence of the people from the count territories of Toulouse, Provence, and ancient County of Barcelona. It was part of the wider cultural and linguistic region comprising the southern third of France known as Occitania. This area was finally brought under effective control of the French kings in the early 13th century as a result of the Albigensian Crusade, after which it was assigned governors. Narbonne became a major center of Jewish learning in Western Europe. In the 12th century, the court of Ermengarde of Narbonne (r. 1134–1192) presided over one of the cultural centers where the spirit of courtly love was developed.

=== Jewish community of Narbonne ===
In the 11th and 12th centuries, Narbonne was home to an important Jewish exegetical school, which played a pivotal role in the growth and development of the Zarphatic (Judæo-French) and Shuadit (Judæo-Provençal) languages in medieval France. Jews had settled in Narbonne from about the 5th century CE, with a community that numbered about 2,000 people in the 12th century. At this time, Narbonne was frequently mentioned in medieval Talmudic works in connection with its Jewish scholars. One source, Abraham ibn Daud of Toledo, gives them an importance similar to the Jewish exilarchs of Babylon. Furthermore, the Jewish community of Narbonne was home to the Benveniste and Kalonymos, two wealthy families of Sephardic Jewish scholars and noblemen established in medieval France, Germany, Spain, and other countries in Southern Europe. In the 12th and 13th centuries, the community went through a series of ups and downs before settling into extended decline.

=== Narbonne loses its river and port ===
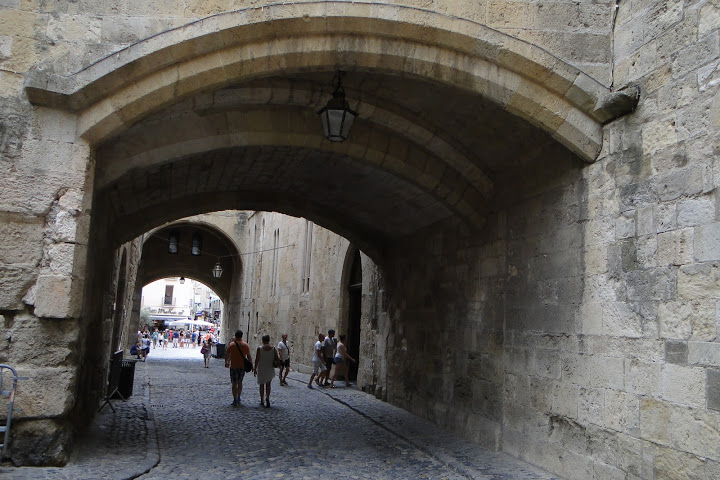
Old town of Narbonne

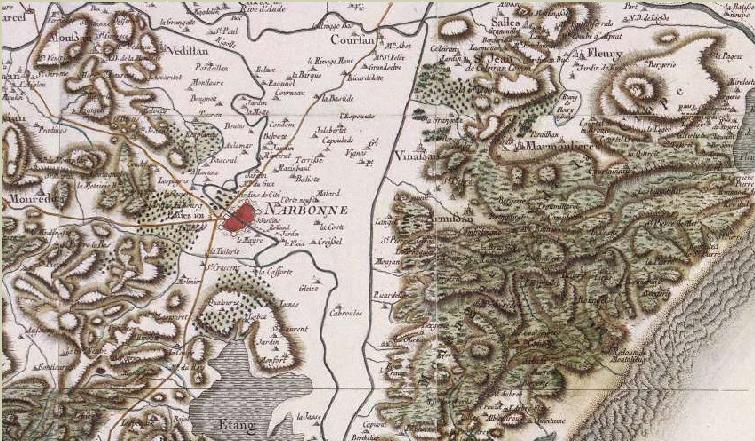
Narbonne c. 1780

Narbonne itself fell into a slow decline in the 14th century, for a variety of reasons. One was due to a change in the course of the river Aude, which caused increased silting of the navigational access. The river, known as the Atax in ancient times, had always had two main courses which split close to Salelles; one fork going south through Narbonne and then to the sea close to the Massif de la Clape, the other heading east to the etang at Vendres close to the current mouth of the river well to the east of the city. The Romans had improved the navigability of the river by building a dam near Salelles and also by canalising the river as it passed through its marshy delta to the sea (then as now the canal was known as the Robine.) A major flood in 1320 swept the dam away. The Aude river had a long history of overflowing its banks. When it was a bustling port, the distance from the coast was approximately 5 to 10 km (3 to 6 mi), but at that time the access to the sea was deep enough only when the river was in full spate which made communication between port and city unreliable.

However, goods could easily be transported by land and in shallow barges from the ports (there were several: a main port and forward ports for larger vessels; indeed the navigability from the sea into the étang and then into the river had been a perennial problem). The changes to the long seashore which resulted from the silting up of the series of graus or openings which were interspersed between the islands which made up the shoreline (St. Martin; St. Lucie) had a more serious impact than the change in course of the river. Other causes of decline were the Plague and the raid of Edward, the Black Prince, which caused much devastation. The growth of other ports was also a factor.

=== Narbonne Cathedral ===
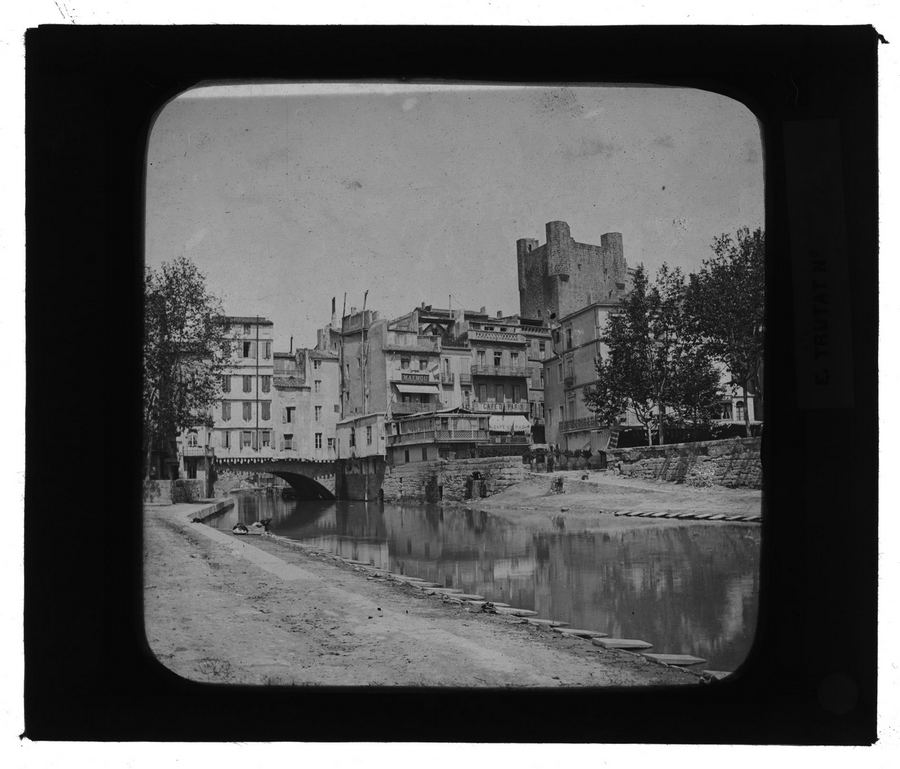
The city of Narbonne in the late 19th century

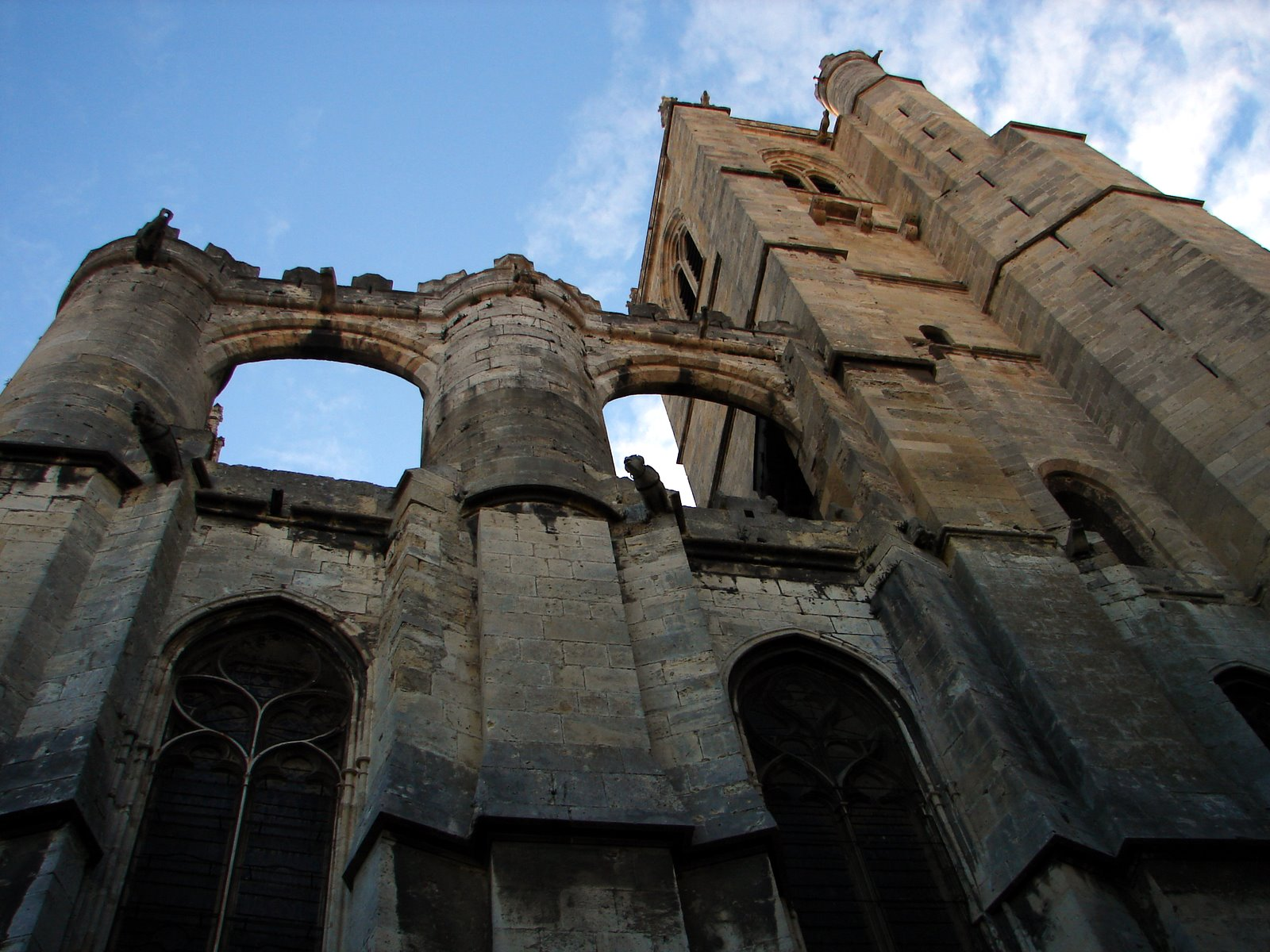
Part of the unfinished section of the Cathedral Saint-Just-et-Saint-Pasteur

The Narbonne Cathedral, dedicated to Saints Justus and Pastor, provides stark evidence of Narbonne's sudden and dramatic change of fortunes when one sees at the rear of the structure the enormously ambitious building programme frozen in time, for the cathedral—still one of the tallest in France—was never finished. The reasons are many, but the most important is that completing the cathedral would have required demolishing the city wall. The 14th century also brought the plague and a host of reasons for retaining the pre-Visigothic, 5th-century walls. Yet the choir, side chapels, sacristy, and courtyard remain intact, and the cathedral, although no longer the seat of a bishop or archbishop, remains the primary place of worship for the Roman Catholic population of the city, and is a major tourist attraction.

=== Building of the Canal de la Robine ===
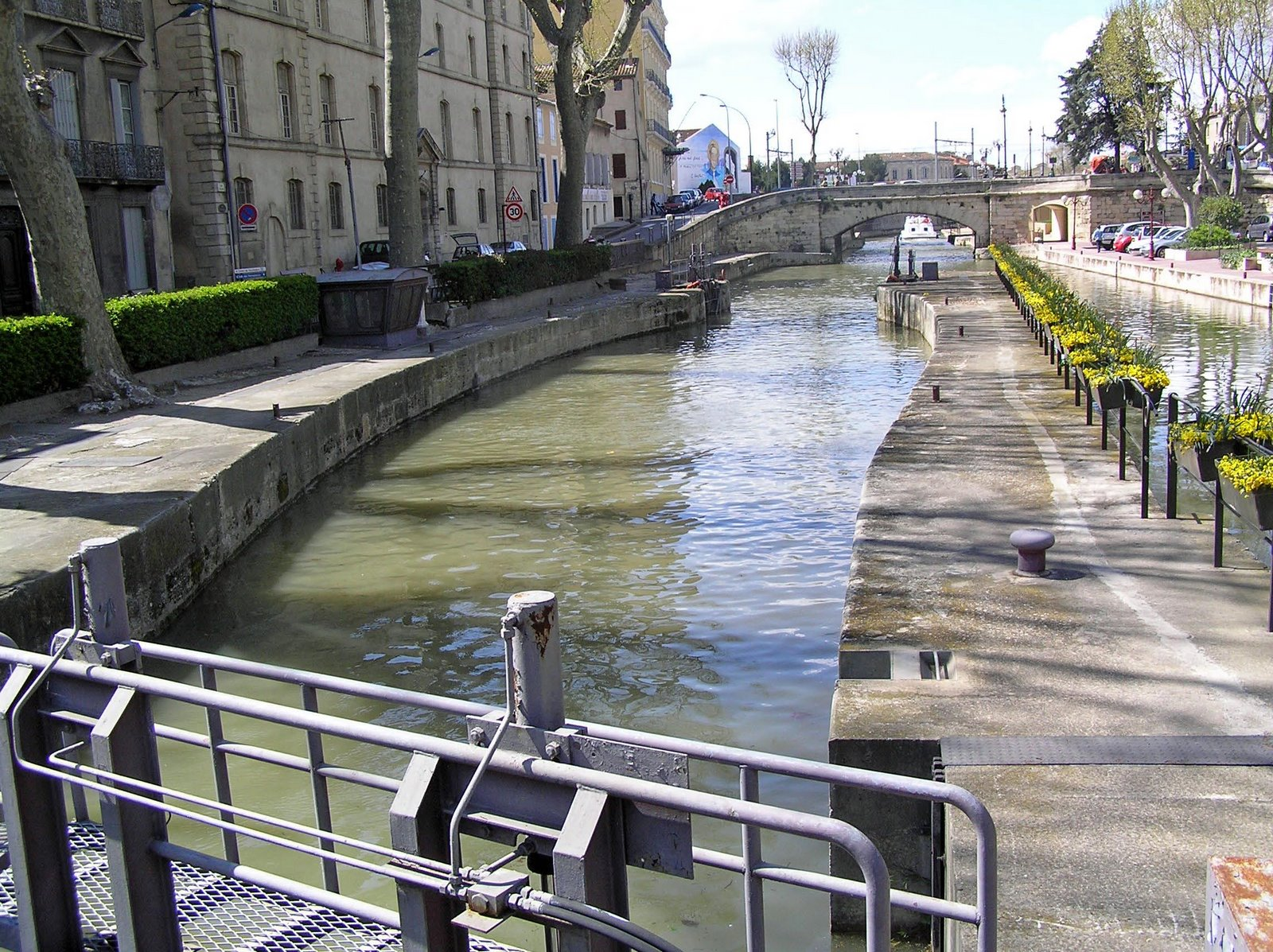
The Canal de la Robine in 2003. (Taken from the "Passerelle entre Deux Villes" pedestrian bridge, facing northwest, away from the heart of the city.)

From the sixteenth century, eager to maintain a link to important trade, the people of Narbonne began costly work to the vestiges of the river Aude's access to the sea so that it would remain navigable to a limited draft vessel and also serve as a link with the Royal Canal. This major undertaking resulted in the construction of the Canal de la Robine, which was finally linked with the Canal du Midi (then known as the Royal Canal) via the Canal de Jonction in 1776.

In the 19th century, the canal system in the south of France had to compete with an expanding rail network, which could ship goods more quickly. The canals kept some importance as they were used to support the flourishing wine trade. Despite its decline from Roman times, Narbonne held on to its vital but limited importance as a trading route. This has continued in more recent centuries.

== Geography ==
Narbonne is linked to the nearby Canal du Midi and the river Aude by the Canal de la Robine, which runs through the centre of town. It is very close to the A9 motorway, which connects Montpellier and Nîmes to Perpignan and, across the border, to Barcelona in Spain. There is also a recently renovated train station which serves the TGV to Spain, Paris and Calais, which in turn connects to the Eurostar. Narbonne is only 10 km from Narbonne Plage (beach), but it is only 2 km from the nearest open water, at La Nautique, although there is no sand, rather pebbles.

=== Climate ===
Climate data for Narbonne (1991–2020 normals, extremes 1989–present)
Month	Jan	Feb	Mar	Apr	May	Jun	Jul	Aug	Sep	Oct	Nov	Dec	Year
Record high °C (°F)	22.8 (73.0)	23.3 (73.9)	28.6 (83.5)	31.0 (87.8)	33.9 (93.0)	40.2 (104.4)	38.8 (101.8)	42.1 (107.8)	36.9 (98.4)	32.7 (90.9)	25.6 (78.1)	22.5 (72.5)	42.1 (107.8)
Mean daily maximum °C (°F)	10.9 (51.6)	12.1 (53.8)	15.5 (59.9)	18.1 (64.6)	21.8 (71.2)	26.4 (79.5)	29.3 (84.7)	29.1 (84.4)	24.9 (76.8)	19.9 (67.8)	14.6 (58.3)	11.5 (52.7)	19.5 (67.1)
Daily mean °C (°F)	7.8 (46.0)	8.4 (47.1)	11.3 (52.3)	13.6 (56.5)	17.2 (63.0)	21.3 (70.3)	24.0 (75.2)	23.9 (75.0)	20.2 (68.4)	16.2 (61.2)	11.4 (52.5)	8.5 (47.3)	15.3 (59.5)
Mean daily minimum °C (°F)	4.7 (40.5)	4.7 (40.5)	7.1 (44.8)	9.1 (48.4)	12.6 (54.7)	16.2 (61.2)	18.6 (65.5)	18.6 (65.5)	15.5 (59.9)	12.5 (54.5)	8.2 (46.8)	5.5 (41.9)	11.1 (52.0)
Record low °C (°F)	−4.7 (23.5)	−8.1 (17.4)	−5.2 (22.6)	0.3 (32.5)	2.2 (36.0)	8.7 (47.7)	11.2 (52.2)	11.8 (53.2)	7.8 (46.0)	2.0 (35.6)	−3.9 (25.0)	−6.0 (21.2)	−8.1 (17.4)
Average precipitation mm (inches)	61.4 (2.42)	46.5 (1.83)	48.2 (1.90)	63.6 (2.50)	51.3 (2.02)	32.5 (1.28)	17.0 (0.67)	31.1 (1.22)	60.6 (2.39)	92.5 (3.64)	78.4 (3.09)	52.2 (2.06)	635.3 (25.01)
Average precipitation days (≥ 1.0 mm)	5.9	4.9	5.9	6.4	6.1	3.7	2.6	3.6	4.5	5.9	5.7	5.5	60.6
Mean daily sunshine hours	4	6	8	8	8	10	11	9	8	6	5	4	7.25
Source: Meteociel; holiday-weather.com

Climate data for Narbonne
Month	Jan	Feb	Mar	Apr	May	Jun	Jul	Aug	Sep	Oct	Nov	Dec	Year
Average sea temperature °C	13	13	13	14	16	19	22	23	21	18	16	14	16.8
Average Wind Speed km/h	20.9	21.2	20.9	20.5	19.4	19.1	19.8	18.0	17.3	17.6	19.8	19.4	19.4
Source: holiday-weather.com; Meteo France

== Population ==
Historical population

Year	Pop.	±% p.a.
1793	9,050	—
1800	9,086	+0.06%
1806	9,464	+0.68%
1821	9,940	+0.33%
1831	10,246	+0.30%
1836	10,762	+0.99%
1841	11,907	+2.04%
1846	11,427	−0.82%
1851	13,066	+2.72%
1856	14,300	+1.82%
1861	16,062	+2.35%
1866	17,172	+1.35%
1872	17,266	+0.09%
1876	19,968	+3.70%
1881	28,134	+7.10%
1886	29,702	+1.09%
1891	29,566	−0.09%
1896	27,824	−1.21%
1901	28,852	+0.73%

Year	Pop.	±% p.a.
1906	27,039	−1.29%
1911	28,173	+0.83%
1921	28,956	+0.27%
1926	29,841	+0.60%
1931	31,909	+1.35%
1936	30,047	−1.20%
1946	29,975	−0.02%
1954	32,060	+0.84%
1962	33,891	+0.70%
1968	38,441	+2.12%
1975	39,342	+0.33%
1982	41,565	+0.79%
1990	45,849	+1.23%
1999	46,510	+0.16%
2007	51,306	+1.23%
2012	51,869	+0.22%
2017	54,700	+1.07%
2023	57,587	+0.86%

Source: EHESS and INSEE (1968–2023)

== Sights ==
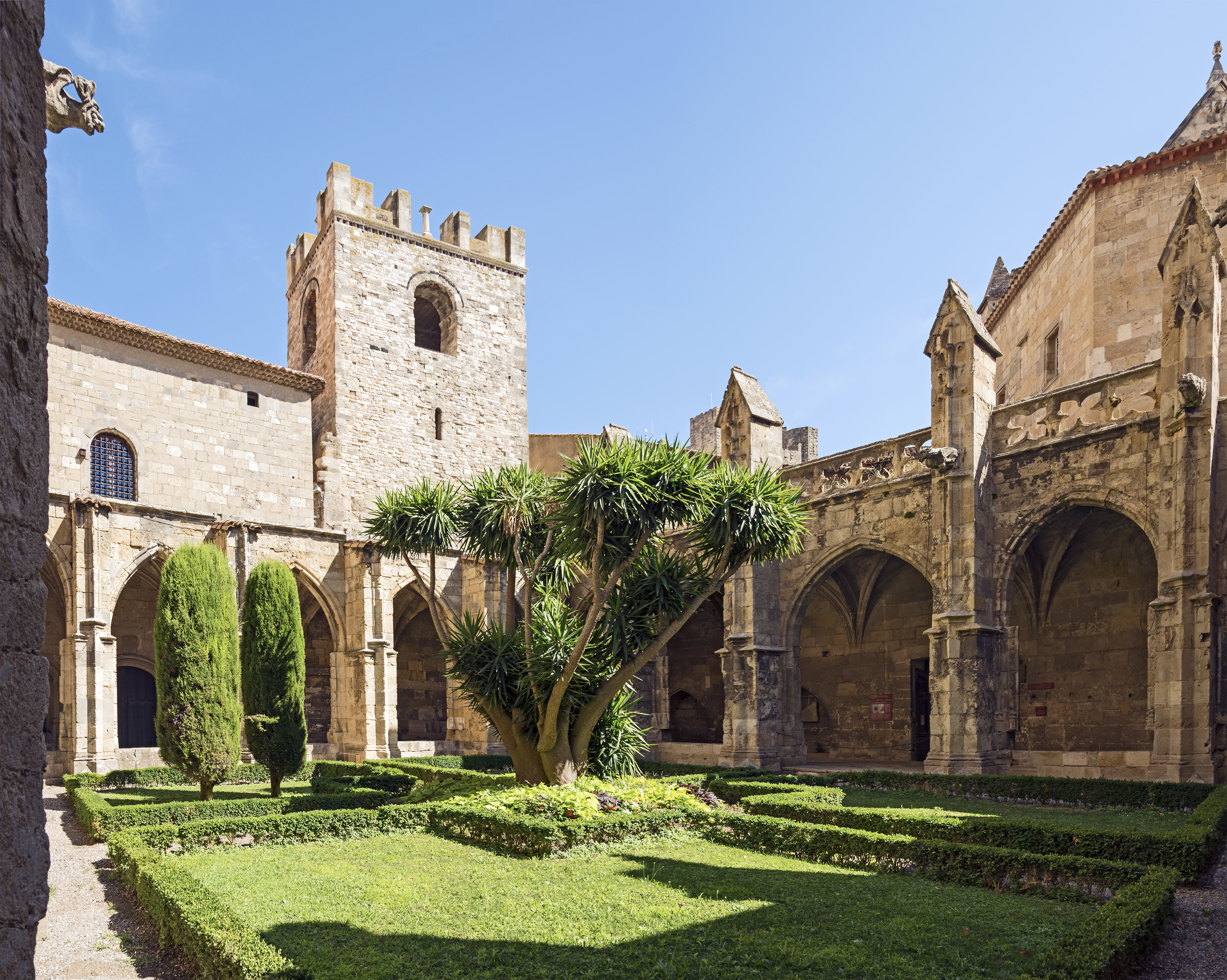
Cloister of the Archbishops' Palace

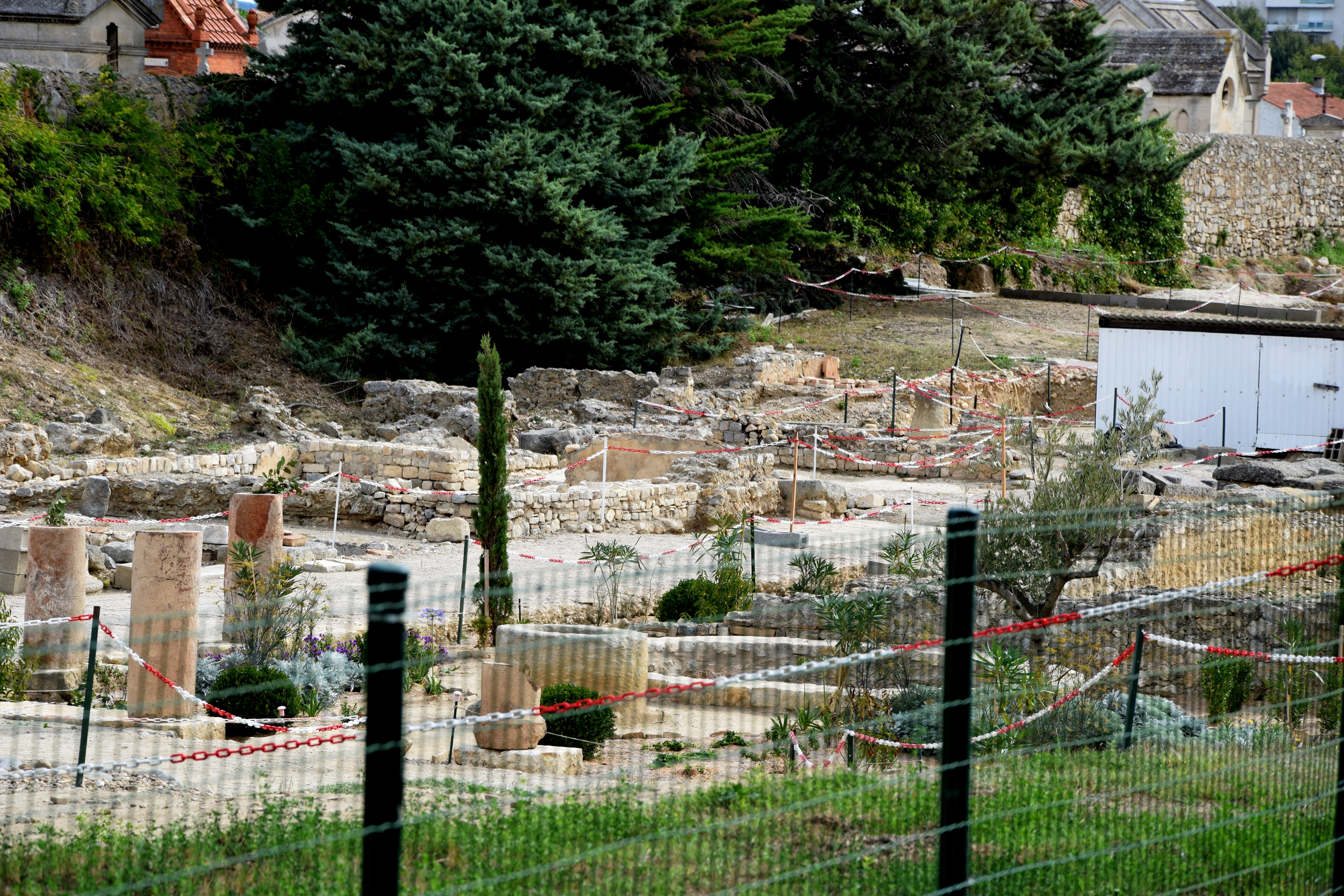
Archaeological site of Clos de la Lombarde

- The Cathedral Saint-Just-et-Saint-Pasteur, dating from 1272.
- The Palace of the Archbishops of Narbonne and its donjon with views over the city, designated as a monument historique by the French Ministry of Culture in 1840.
- Musée Archeologique, an archaeological museum in the town centre.
- Clos de la Lombarde, an archaeological site presenting the vestiges of Roman townhouses, bath houses, and workshops from the 1st century BCE to the 3rd century CE, and the first Christian basilica in Narbonne (3rd–4th century CE).
- The Roman Horreum, a former grain warehouse, built underground as a cryptoporticus.
- Remains of the Via Domitia in the city center.
- The canal, Canal de la Robine, running through the centre of the town
- The Halles covered market operates every day. The busiest times are Sunday and Thursday mornings.
- The nearby limestone massif, known as La Clape, and the beach at Narbonne plage.

== Sport ==
Narbonne is home to the rugby union team RC Narbonne founded in 1907. It is a historic team in France, Narbonne have twice won the French first division title and reached a European final in 2001. They play at the Parc des Sports Et de l'Amitié (capacity 12,000). They wear orange and black.

== Transport ==
The Gare de Narbonne railway station offers direct connections to Paris, Barcelona, Toulouse, Marseille, and many regional destinations. An extensive local system of buses and routes operated by Citibus.fr allow for easy public transport within Narbonne and surrounding communities.

The nearest airports to Narbonne are Marseille Provence, Toulouse–Blagnac, Perpignan–Rivesaltes, and Montpellier–Méditerranée airports.

== Personalities ==
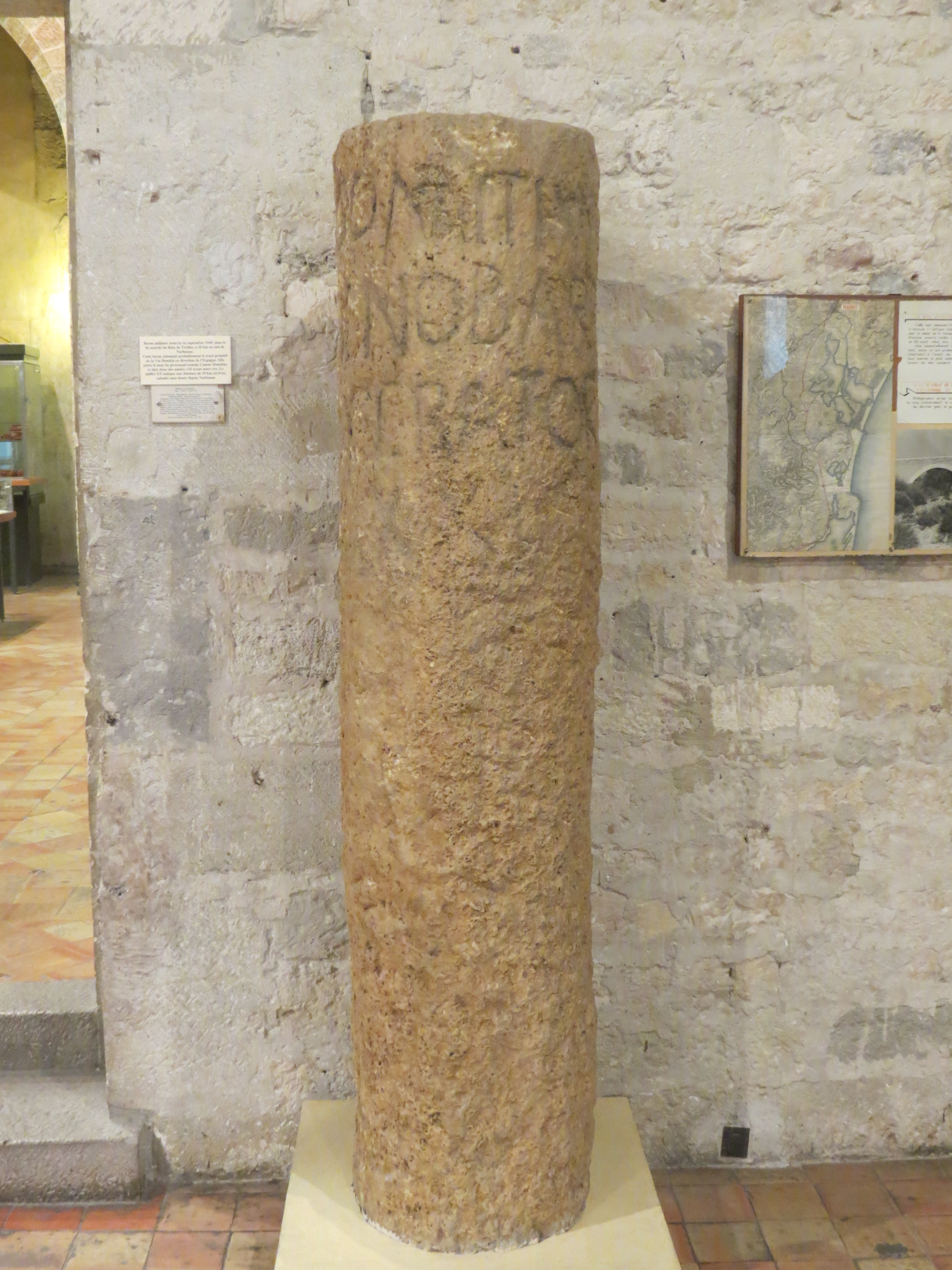
Milestone of Gnaeus Domitius Ahenobarbus, founder of the Roman colony of Narbo Martius. The marker is one of the earliest Latin inscriptions found in France (c. 118 BCE).

- Varro Atacinus (c. 82 – c. 35 BCE), Roman poet from the Roman province of Gallia Narbonensis
- Marcus Aurelius Carus (c. 222 – c. 283 CE), Roman Emperor from the Roman province of Gallia Narbonensis (r. 282–283), known for his late victories against the Sasanian Empire and the Germanic tribes
- Noble Jewish family of Benveniste, with roots in Narbonne
- Noble Jewish family of Kalonymos, with roots in Narbonne
  - Kalonymus ben Todros (d. c. 1194), medieval Provençal rabbi and Hakham of Provence
  - Makhir of Narbonne (725–765 or 793), medieval Jewish scholar and Nasi of the Jewish community of Narbonne
- Ateyaba (born 1989), French hip-hop artist
- Alexandre Baron (born 1994), French racing driver
- Joseph Barsalou (1600–1669), apothecary and physician whose family was from Narbonne
- Léon Blum (1872–1950), socialist politician and three-time Prime Minister of France, elected as Deputy for Narbonne in 1929, re-elected in 1932 and 1936
- Bonfilh, medieval Jewish troubadour from Narbonne
- Guillaume Barthez de Marmorières (1707–1799), French civil engineer
- Camille Lacourt (born 1985), French FINA World Championships swimmer
- Benjamin Lariche (born 1987), French racing driver
- Jean-Joseph de Mondonville (1711–1772), French violinist and composer
- Moshe ha-Darshan (11th century), medieval Jewish scholar and rosh yeshiva at the rabbinic seminary of Narbonne
- Anaïs Napoleón (1827 or 1831–1912 or 1916), French-Spanish photographer
- Pierre Reverdy (1889–1960), French Surrealist poet
- Saint Sebastian, early Christian martyr and saint (c. 255 – c. 288), killed during the Diocletianic Persecution
- Dimitri Szarzewski (born 1983), French rugby player
- Charles Trenet (1913–2001), French singer-songwriter

== International relations ==
Narbonne is twinned with:

- Aosta, Italy
- Grosseto, Italy
- (United Kingdom) Salford, England
- Weilheim, Germany

== See also ==
- A Jewish Princedom in Feudal France
- Bierzo Edict
- Communes of the Aude department
- Corbières AOC
- Gallo-Roman culture
- Gothic Wars
- Historia de regibus Gothorum, Vandalorum et Suevorum
- Medieval history of the Kingdom of France
- Praetorian prefecture of Gaul
- Royal Frankish Annals

== Bibliography ==
- Michel Gayraud, Narbonne antique des origines à la fin du IIIe siècle. Paris: De Boccard, Revue archéologique de Narbonnaise, Supplément 8, 1981, 591 p.
- Histoire de Narbonne, Jacques Michaud and André Cabanis, eds, Toulouse: Privat, 2004.
- L’Aude de la préhistoire à nos jours (under the direction of Jacques Crémadeilis), Saint-Jean-d’Angély, 1989.
- Les Audois : dictionnaire biographique, Rémy Cazals et Daniel Fabre, eds., Carcassonne, Association des Amis des Archives de l’Aude, Société d’Études Scientifiques de l’Aude, 1990.
