= Salelles =

Singular population entity in Spain

- Singular population entity
- Location within Spain Location within Catalonia Location within Province of Barcelona
- Coordinates: 41°42′05.9″N 1°47′09.1″E
- Country: Spain
- A. community: Catalunya
- Province: Barcelona
- Comarca: Bages
- Municipality: Sant Salvador de Guardiola

Population (January 1, 2024)
  - Total: 255
- Time zone: UTC+01:00
- Postal code: 08253
- MCN: 08098000600

Salelles is a singular population entity in the municipality of Sant Salvador de Guardiola, in Catalonia, Spain.

As of 2024 it has a population of 255 people.
