= Lespignan =

Lespignan Lespinhan (Occitan)
- Commune
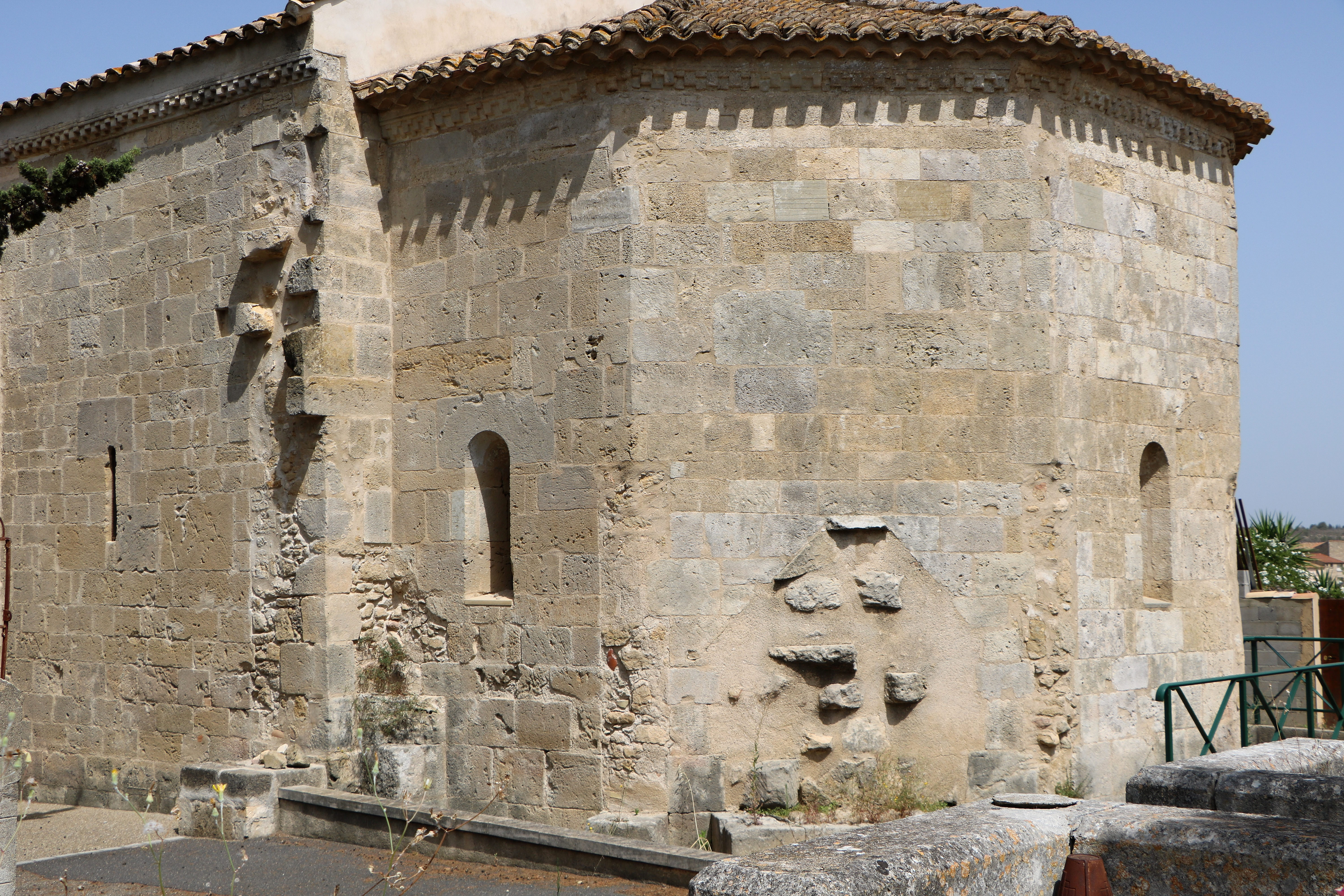
- Église Saint-Pierre

- Coat of arms
- Location of Lespignan
- Location within France Location within Occitanie
- Coordinates: 43°16′28″N 3°10′21″E
- Country: France
- Region: Occitania
- Department: Hérault
- Arrondissement: Béziers
- Canton: Béziers-1
- Intercommunality: CC la Domitienne

Government
  - Mayor (2020–2026): Jean-François Guibbert
- Area^{1}: 22.92 km^{2} (8.85 sq mi)
- Elevation: 61 m (200 ft)
- Highest elevation: 90 m (300 ft)
- Lowest elevation: 0 m (0 ft)
- Population (2023): 3,414
  - Density: 149.0/km^{2} (385.8/sq mi)
- Demonym: Lespignanais
- Time zone: UTC+01:00 (CET)
  - Summer (DST): UTC+02:00 (CEST)
- INSEE/Postal code: 34135 /34710
- ^{1} French Land Register data, which excludes lakes, ponds, glaciers > 1 km^{2} (0.386 sq mi or 247 acres) and river estuaries.

Lespignan (French pronunciation: [lɛspiɲɑ̃]; Occitan: Lespinhan) is a commune in the Hérault département in the Occitanie region in southern France.

Experiencing a Mediterranean climate, it is drained by the Aude River and various other small streams. The commune boasts a remarkable natural heritage: three Natura 2000 sites (the "Lower Plain of the Aude," the "Lower Course of the Aude," and the "Hills of Narbonnais"), two protected areas (the "Lower Plain of the Aude and Collines d'Enserune" and the "Lower Plain of the Aude"), and eight natural areas of ecological, faunal, and floristic interest.

Lespignan is a rural commune with 3,355 inhabitants in 2022, having experienced a significant population increase since 1962. It is located within the Lespignan urban area and is part of the Béziers catchment area. Its inhabitants are called Lespignanais or Lespignanaises.

== Geography ==
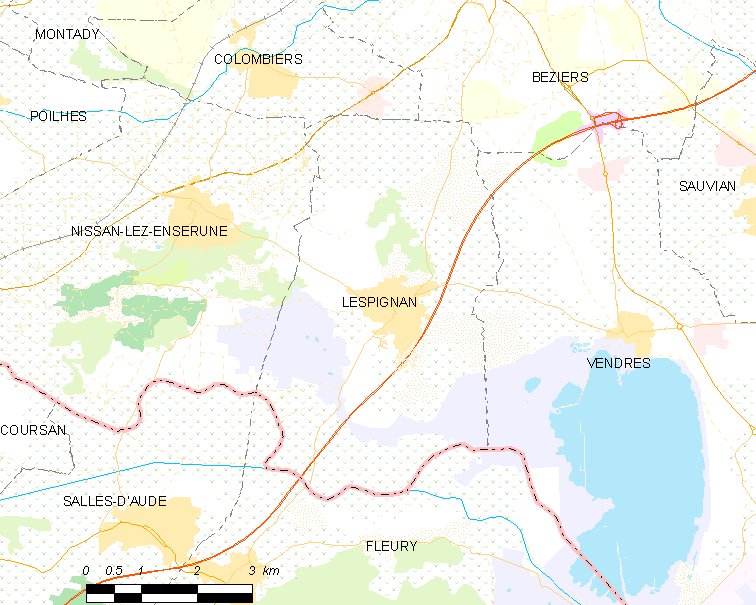
Map

Lespignan is located 10 km south (slightly southwest) of Béziers, 10 km from the sea. Lespignan is a commune bordering the department of Aude, this demarcation is made via the river "Aude". The territory of Lespignan is shared between the village itself and certain rural areas where the cultivation of the vine is very marked. The current trend advocates the appearance of numerous residential districts around the town center focused on local commerce.

=== Neighboring communes ===
The neighboring communes are Béziers, Colombiers, Fleury, Nissan-lez-Enserune, Salles-d'Aude and Vendres.

=== Communication routes ===
==== Roads ====
Lespignan's road network follows the A9 and has a motorway service area. The D14 leads out of the village towards Fleury, Aude to the south and towards Béziers to the north. The D37 leads to the village of Nissan-lez-Ensérune to the west and the village of Vendres to the east.

=== Public transport ===
The village of Lespignan is served by Line 212, which leads directly to Béziers. The line is operated by the Hérault Transport company.

=== Natural environment ===
Although poorly studied so far, it is very interesting because of the Matte pond, the homonymous canal which unites it to the Vendres pond and a group of Miocene hills dominating the latter. Among them, the Puech des Moulins (Figure 1) and the Puech Blanc bar (Figure 2) The vegetation covering the reliefs is a typical Languedoc garrigue whose inventory was carried out with that of Vendres.

=== Climate ===
Lespignan has a mediterranean climate (Köppen climate classification Csa). The average annual temperature in Lespignan is 15.3 °C (59.5 °F). The average annual rainfall is 620.7 mm (24.44 in) with October as the wettest month. The temperatures are highest on average in July, at around 23.8 °C (74.8 °F), and lowest in January, at around 8.0 °C (46.4 °F). The highest temperature ever recorded in Lespignan was 40.1 °C (104.2 °F) on 12 August 2003; the coldest temperature ever recorded was −9.0 °C (15.8 °F) on 22 November 1998.

Climate data for Lespignan (1981–2010 averages, extremes 1989−present)
Month	Jan	Feb	Mar	Apr	May	Jun	Jul	Aug	Sep	Oct	Nov	Dec	Year
Record high °C (°F)	21.5 (70.7)	25.5 (77.9)	29.8 (85.6)	33.0 (91.4)	34.5 (94.1)	39.3 (102.7)	38.8 (101.8)	40.1 (104.2)	39.0 (102.2)	33.0 (91.4)	26.6 (79.9)	21.7 (71.1)	40.1 (104.2)
Mean daily maximum °C (°F)	12.1 (53.8)	13.3 (55.9)	16.6 (61.9)	18.6 (65.5)	22.7 (72.9)	26.9 (80.4)	29.9 (85.8)	29.9 (85.8)	25.5 (77.9)	20.8 (69.4)	15.6 (60.1)	12.3 (54.1)	20.4 (68.7)
Daily mean °C (°F)	8.0 (46.4)	8.7 (47.7)	11.4 (52.5)	13.5 (56.3)	17.4 (63.3)	21.1 (70.0)	23.8 (74.8)	23.8 (74.8)	19.8 (67.6)	16.3 (61.3)	11.4 (52.5)	8.3 (46.9)	15.3 (59.5)
Mean daily minimum °C (°F)	3.8 (38.8)	4.1 (39.4)	6.3 (43.3)	8.4 (47.1)	12.2 (54.0)	15.3 (59.5)	17.7 (63.9)	17.7 (63.9)	14.1 (57.4)	11.7 (53.1)	7.1 (44.8)	4.3 (39.7)	10.3 (50.5)
Record low °C (°F)	−6.3 (20.7)	−8.0 (17.6)	−7.0 (19.4)	−0.7 (30.7)	3.3 (37.9)	4.0 (39.2)	9.5 (49.1)	9.0 (48.2)	5.0 (41.0)	−1.0 (30.2)	−9.0 (15.8)	−7.5 (18.5)	−9.0 (15.8)
Average precipitation mm (inches)	60.3 (2.37)	52.1 (2.05)	34.9 (1.37)	57.0 (2.24)	49.5 (1.95)	31.8 (1.25)	13.7 (0.54)	30.4 (1.20)	71.6 (2.82)	90.5 (3.56)	73.8 (2.91)	55.1 (2.17)	620.7 (24.44)
Average precipitation days (≥ 1.0 mm)	5.8	4.7	4.3	6.2	5.4	3.7	2.2	3.6	4.7	6.2	5.2	5.0	56.8
Source: Meteociel

=== Natural environments and biodiversity ===
==== Protected areas ====
Regulatory protection is the most effective means of intervention for preserving remarkable natural areas and their associated biodiversity.

Two protected areas are located in the commune:

- the "Basse Plaine de l'Aude et Collines d'Enserune," a piece of land acquired (or similarly protected) by a natural area conservatory, covering an area of 142.4 hectares;
- the "Basse Plaine de l'Aude," a piece of land acquired by the Conservatoire du littoral, covering an area of 1,464.1 hectares.

==== Natura 2000 ====
The Natura 2000 network is a European ecological network of natural sites of ecological interest developed based on the Habitats and Birds Directives, consisting of Special Areas of Conservation (SACs) and Special Protection Areas (SPAs).

A Natura 2000 site is defined in the municipality under both the Birds Directive and the Habitats Directive: the "lower plain of the Aude". Covering an area of 4,500 ha, this site includes a group of Mediterranean coastal wetlands with small dune environments and salt marshes behind the beach. This is a major site for the lesser grey shrike, which has populations close to half the national population, and for breeding species exceeding the threshold of 1% of their national population: Eurasian bittern, little bittern, purple heron, western marsh harrier, black-winged stilt, little egret, common tern, little tern, moustached warbler, and european roller.

Two other sites fall under the Habitats Directive:

- The "lower course of the Aude," covering an area of 5,358 ha, allows the reproduction of vulnerable migratory species (twait shad, sea lamprey), which have been in sharp decline since the proliferation of watercourse structures;
- the "Narbonnais hills", with an area of 2,149 ha, formed by a succession of reliefs which overlook and delimit the plain of the lower valley of the Aude, where a typical Mediterranean vegetation of garrigue and dry lawns as well as a woodland of Aleppo pines have developed.

==== Natural areas of ecological, faunal and floral interest ====
The inventory of natural areas of ecological, faunal, and floral interest (ZNIEFF) aims to cover the most ecologically interesting areas, primarily with a view to improving knowledge of the national natural heritage and providing various decision-makers with a tool to help them take the environment into account in land use planning. Six type 1 ZNIEFFs are listed in the commune:

- the "Lower Aude Wine Plain" (1,438 ha), covering four communes, two of which are in Aude and two in Hérault;
- the "Nissan Hills" (487 ha), covering two communes in the department;
- the "Northern Hills of Lespignan" (81 ha), covering two communes in the department;
- the "Southern Hills of Lespignan" (116 ha), covering two communes in the department;
- the "Vendres Pond" (1,647 ha), covering three municipalities, one in Aude and two in Hérault;
- the "Matte Pond and Meadows" (395 ha), covering two communes in the department;

and two type 2 ZNIEFFs:

- the "Lower Aude Plain and Capestang Pond" (7,120 ha), covering ten municipalities, four in Aude and six in Hérault;
- the "Nissan and Lespignan Hills" (2,645 ha), covering four municipalities in the department.
Map of ZNIEFF types 1 and 2 in Lespignan.

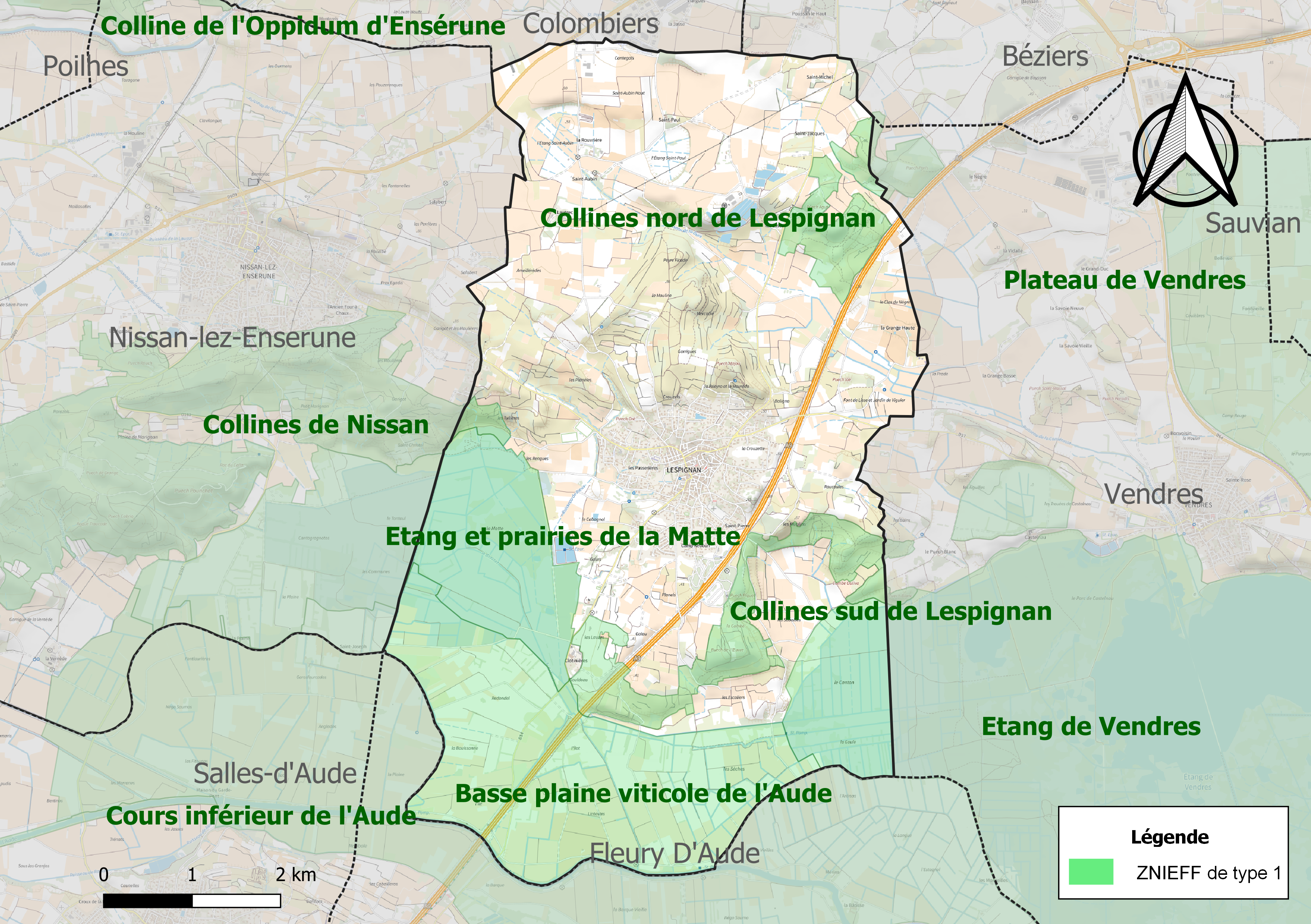
Map of ZNIEFF type 1 in the commune.

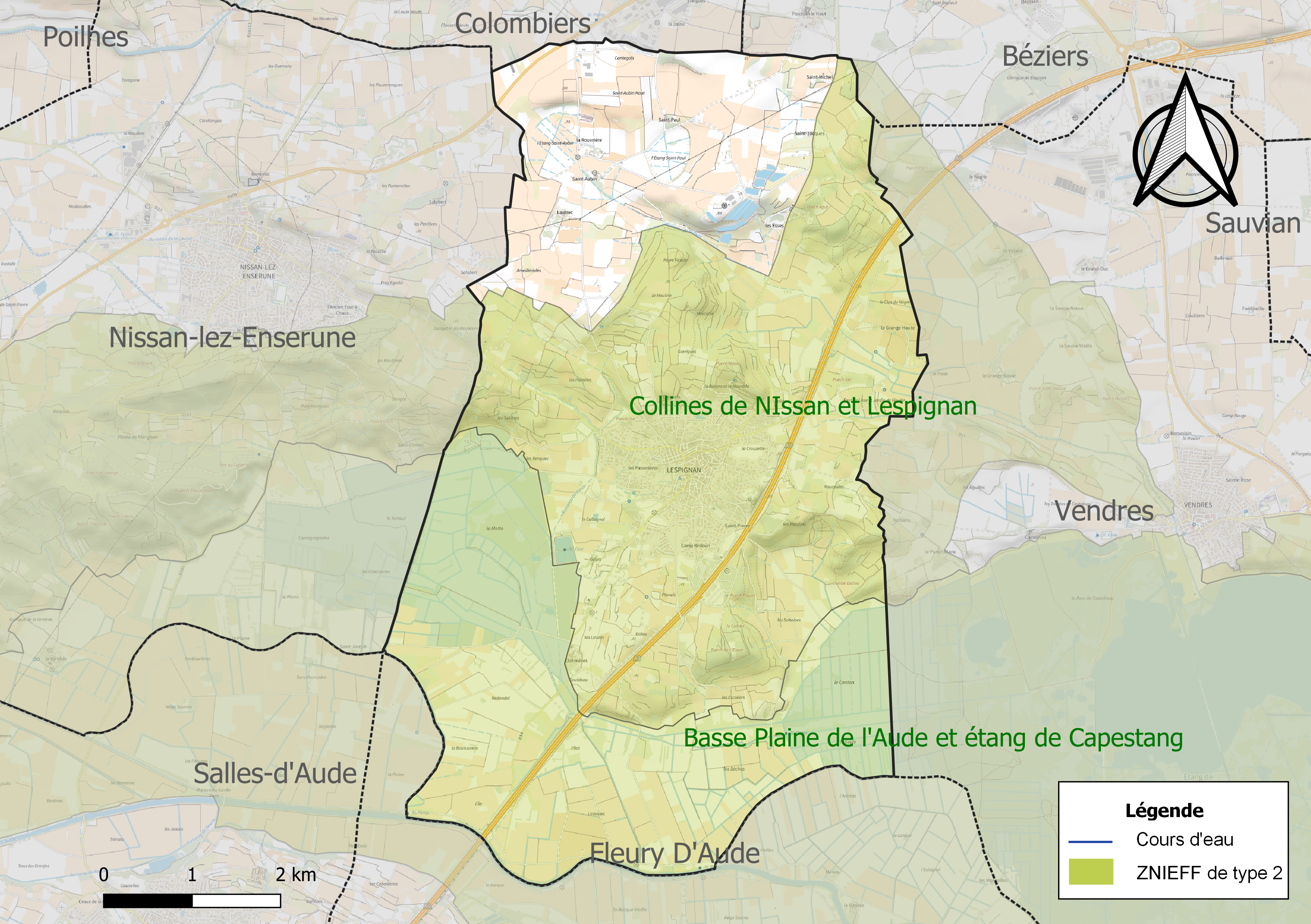
Map of ZNIEFF type 2 in the commune.

== Urban planning ==
=== Typology ===
As of 1 January 2024, Lespignan is categorized as a rural town, according to the new seven-level municipal density grid defined by INSEE in 2022. It belongs to the urban unit of Lespignan, a single-communal urban unit constituting an isolated town. Furthermore, the commune is part of the Béziers attraction area, of which it is a suburban commune. This area, which includes 53 communes, is categorized in areas of 50,000 to less than 200,000 inhabitants.

=== Land use ===
The land use of the municipality, as shown in the European database of biophysical land use Corine Land Cover (CLC), is marked by the importance of agricultural territories (86.6% in 2018), an increase compared to 1990 (76.7%). The detailed breakdown in 2018 is as follows: permanent crops (41.8%), heterogeneous agricultural areas (27.8%), meadows (16.9%), urbanized areas (6.2%), environments with shrub and/or herbaceous vegetation (3.6%), inland wetlands (3.2%), industrial or commercial areas and communication networks (0.6%). The evolution of the land use of the commune and its infrastructures can be observed on the different cartographic representations of the territory: the Cassini map (18th century), the general staff map (1820-1866) and the IGN maps or aerial photos for the current period (1950 to today).

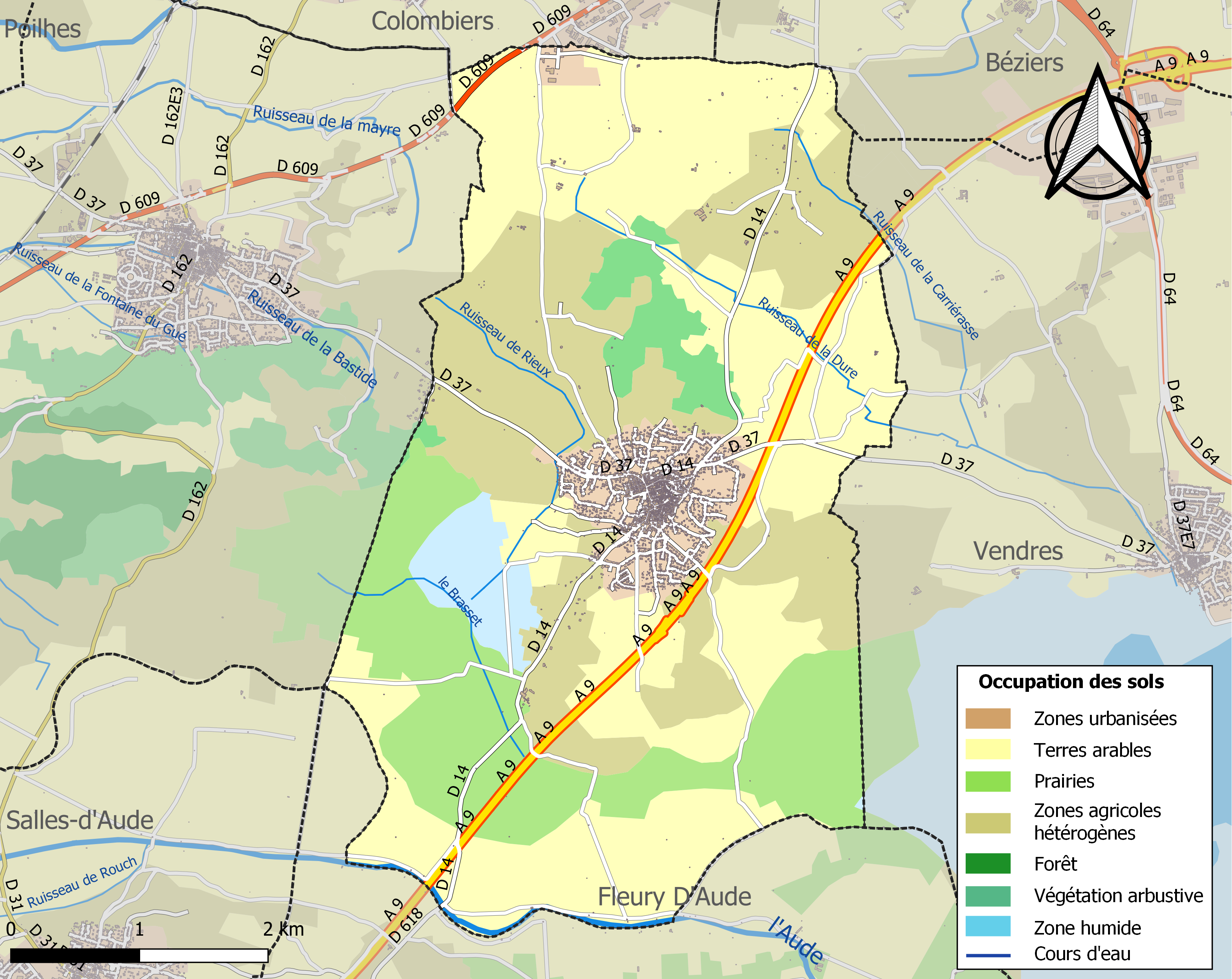
Map of the commune's infrastructure and land use in 2018 (CLC).

=== Major risks ===
The territory of the commune of Lespignan is vulnerable to various natural hazards: meteorological (storms, thunderstorms, snow, extreme cold, heatwave or drought), floods, forest fires and earthquakes (low seismicity). It is also exposed to a technological risk, the transport of dangerous materials.

==== Natural risks ====
Certain parts of the municipal territory are likely to be affected by the risk of flooding due to overflowing rivers, particularly the Aude. The municipality has been declared a state of natural disaster due to damage caused by floods and mudslides in 1982, 1986, 1987, 1992, 1993, 1996, 1999, 2003, and 2019.

Lespignan is exposed to the risk of forest fires. A departmental forest fire protection plan (PDPFCI) was approved in June 2013 and runs until 2022, when it must be renewed. Individual fire prevention measures are specified by two prefectural decrees and apply in areas exposed to forest fires and within 200 meters of them. The decree of 25 April 2002 regulates the use of fire by prohibiting, in particular, bringing fire, smoking and throwing cigarette butts in sensitive areas and on the roads that cross them under penalty of sanctions. The decree of 11 March 2013 makes clearing of brushwood mandatory, the responsibility of the owner or beneficiary.

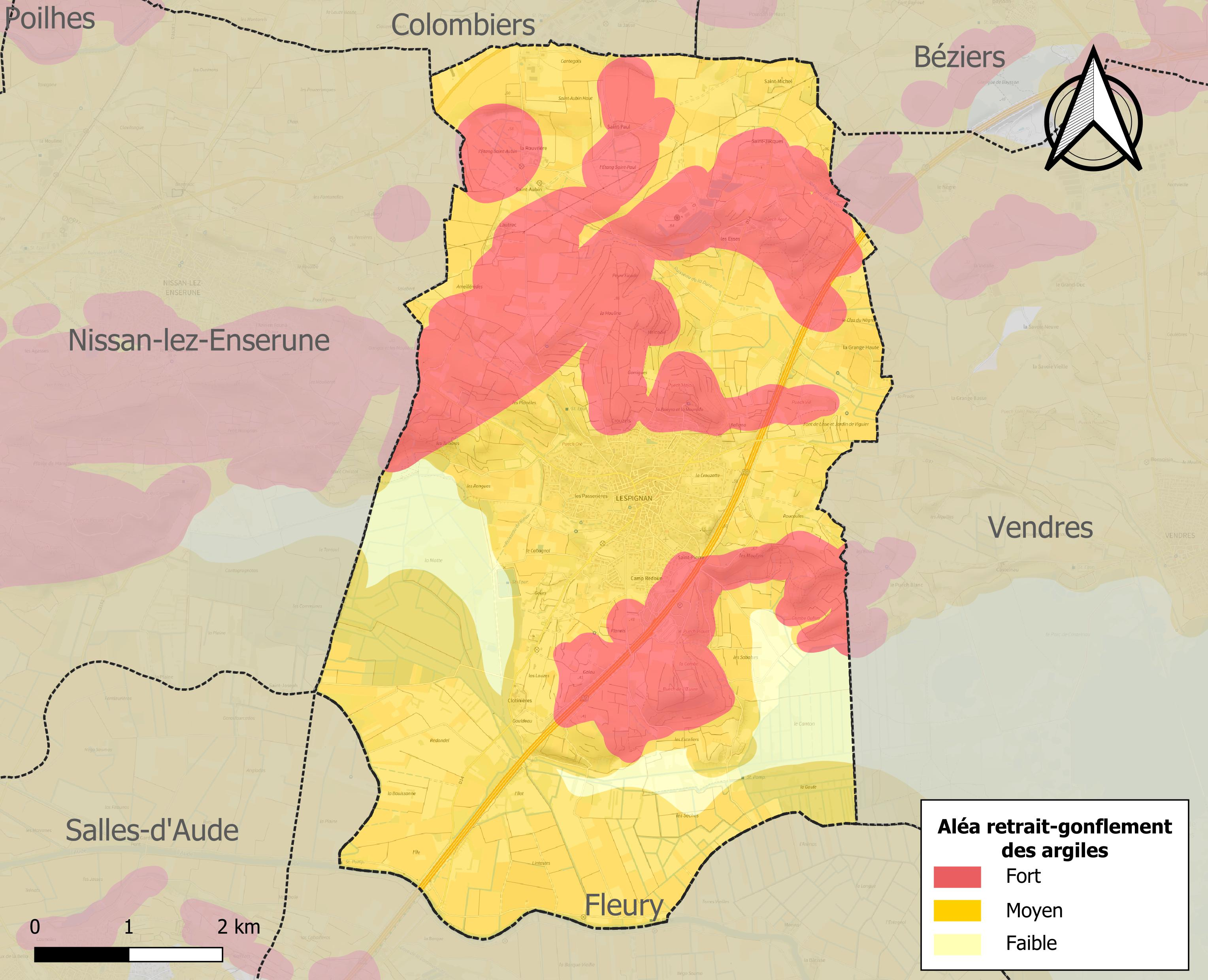
Map of the shrinkage-swelling hazard zones of clay soils in Lespignan.

The shrinkage-swelling of clay soils can cause significant damage to buildings in the event of alternating periods of drought and rain. 91.3% of the communal area is at medium or high risk (59.3% at the departmental level and 48.5% at the national level). Of the 1,566 buildings counted in the commune in 2019, 1,566 are at medium or high risk, or 100%, compared to 85% at the departmental level and 54% at the national level. A map of the national territory's exposure to the shrinkage-swelling of clay soils is available on the BRGM website.

Furthermore, to better understand the risk of land subsidence, the national inventory of underground cavities allows us to locate those located in the commune.

==== Technological risks ====
The risk of transporting hazardous materials in the municipality is linked to its crossing by major road or rail infrastructure or the presence of a hydrocarbon transport pipeline. An accident occurring on such infrastructure is likely to have serious effects on property, people or the environment, depending on the nature of the material transported. Urban planning provisions may be recommended accordingly.

== Economy ==
=== Income ===
In 2018, the commune had 1,518 tax households, comprising 3,434 people. The median disposable income per consumption unit was €20,070 (€20,330 in the department). 43% of tax households were taxed (45.8% in the department).

=== Employment ===
In 2018, the population aged 15 to 64 was 1,935, of which 73.5% were active (61% employed and 12.6% unemployed) and 26.5% were inactive. Since 2008, the communal unemployment rate (as defined by the census) for 15-64 year-olds has been higher than that of France and the department.

The commune is part of the Béziers catchment area, as at least 15% of the active population work in the area. It had 331 jobs in 2018, compared to 387 in 2013 and 367 in 2008. The number of employed people residing in the commune is 1,192, representing an employment concentration indicator of 27.8% and an employment rate among those aged 15 or over of 52%.

Of these 1,192 employed people aged 15 or over, 209 work in the commune, representing 18% of the population. To get to work, 89.6% of residents use a personal or company four-wheeled vehicle, 1.8% use public transport, 5.1% travel by two-wheeler, bicycle, or on foot, and 3.4% do not need transport (working from home).

=== Non-agricultural activities ===
==== Sectors of activity ====
228 establishments were located in Lespignan as of 31 December 2019. The table below details the number by sector of activity and compares the ratios with those of the department.

Sector of activity	Commune		Department
Sector of activity	Number	%	%
Set	228	100 %	(100 %)
Manufacturing industry, extractive and other industries	23	10,1 %	(6,7 %)
Construction	61	26,8 %	(14,1 %)
Wholesale and retail trade, transport, accommodation and catering	43	18,9 %	(28 %)
Information and communication	4	1,8 %	(3,3 %)
Financial and insurance activities	3	1,3 %	(3,2 %)
Real estate activities	12	5,3 %	(5,3 %)
Specialized, scientific and technical activities and administrative and support services activities	27	11,8 %	(17,1 %)
Public administration, education, human health and social action	35	15,4 %	(14,2 %)
Other service activities	20	8,8 %	(8,1 %)

The construction sector is predominant in the municipality since it represents 26.8% of the total number of establishments in the municipality (61 out of the 228 companies located in Lespignan), compared to 14.1% at the departmental level.

==== Businesses and commerce ====
The five companies headquartered in the municipality that generated the most revenue in 2020 were:

- Assist Conseil Études Bâtiment, engineering, technical studies (€1,073,000)
- Eden Invest, holding company activities (€569,000)
- SARL Sud Olives, food retail at stalls and markets (€328,000)
- Le Petrin, bakery and bakery-pastry shop (€304,000)
- Occitanie Environnement, treatment and disposal of non-hazardous waste (€239,000)

=== Agriculture ===
The commune is in the "Viticole Plain", a small agricultural region occupying the coastal strip of the Hérault department. In 2020, the technical-economic orientation of agriculture in the commune is viticulture.

The number of active farms with their headquarters in the commune fell from 196 in the 1988 agricultural census to 122 in 2000, then to 75 in 2010 and finally to 54 in 2020, a drop of 72% in 32 years. The same trend is observed at the departmental level, which lost 67% of its farms during this period. The agricultural area used in the commune also decreased, from 923 ha in 1988 to 567 ha in 2020. At the same time, the average agricultural area used per farm increased, from 5 to 11 ha.

== History ==
=== Antiquity ===
Remains from the Gallo-Roman period can be seen in the immediate vicinity of the village.

==== The "Villa" Vivios ====
The archaeological site of Villa Vivios is poorly understood: exact meaning and function, water management (input and discharge) in Antiquity; current state of conservation.

==== Careers ====
They are very numerous and can be seen at the places called Cambrasse-Les Escaliers and Gouldeau. They must have provided the materials for the archaeological sites.

=== Middle Ages ===
A document from 1154 mentions that the church of Lespignan belonged to the monastery of Cassan (order of the canons of Saint-Augustin).

=== Old Regime ===
In 1632, Lespignan was besieged by the troops of the King of France.

In 1711, the Prior of Lespignan, François Médaille, handed over his benefice to the Bishop of Béziers, wishing to help his parishioners and the diocese. Thus, the title of Prior of Lespignan was abolished (replaced by a perpetual vicarage managed by the bishop upon presentation by the Commander of Cassan).

To the east of the village, the feudal castle dominated the entire village. Its owner, the Duke of Fleury, could see Narbonne and Pérignan. One of the castle's two towers collapsed in early 1900. The remaining feudal castle has undergone some alterations.

The ramparts contain a breach caused by Louis XIII's artillery, opened during the siege of Lespignan in 1632. As the ramparts were no longer useful, the gap was not repaired. This breach is the current road to Béziers.

As the sea receded, the Lespignan plain remained uncultivated until 1793. The Aude River made it suitable for cultivation. On this plain, where the Matte, due to its salinity, grows samphire, which is used to produce soda. Hence, two or three Renaissance houses in Lespignan, built by Italians (a succession of Italian prelates ruled the bishopric of Béziers from 1547 to 1669) who exported soda to Murano for glassmaking.

=== Modern history ===
The mutiny of the 17th Infantry Regiment of Béziers in 1907, during the winegrowers' revolt, resulted in a massacre of soldiers from Hérault in 1914-1915, most likely sent to the front line as a sign of reprisal (but some authors refute this hypothesis). The war memorials in the villages bear witness to this. 76 Lespignan residents were killed, or nearly one in ten households affected.

== Demographics ==
Historical population
Year	Pop.	±% p.a.
1968	1,874	—
1975	1,871	−0.02%
1982	1,948	+0.58%
1990	2,360	+2.43%
1999	2,568	+0.94%
2007	3,074	+2.27%
2012	3,192	+0.76%
2017	3,260	+0.42%
2023	3,414	+0.77%
Source: INSEE

== Education ==
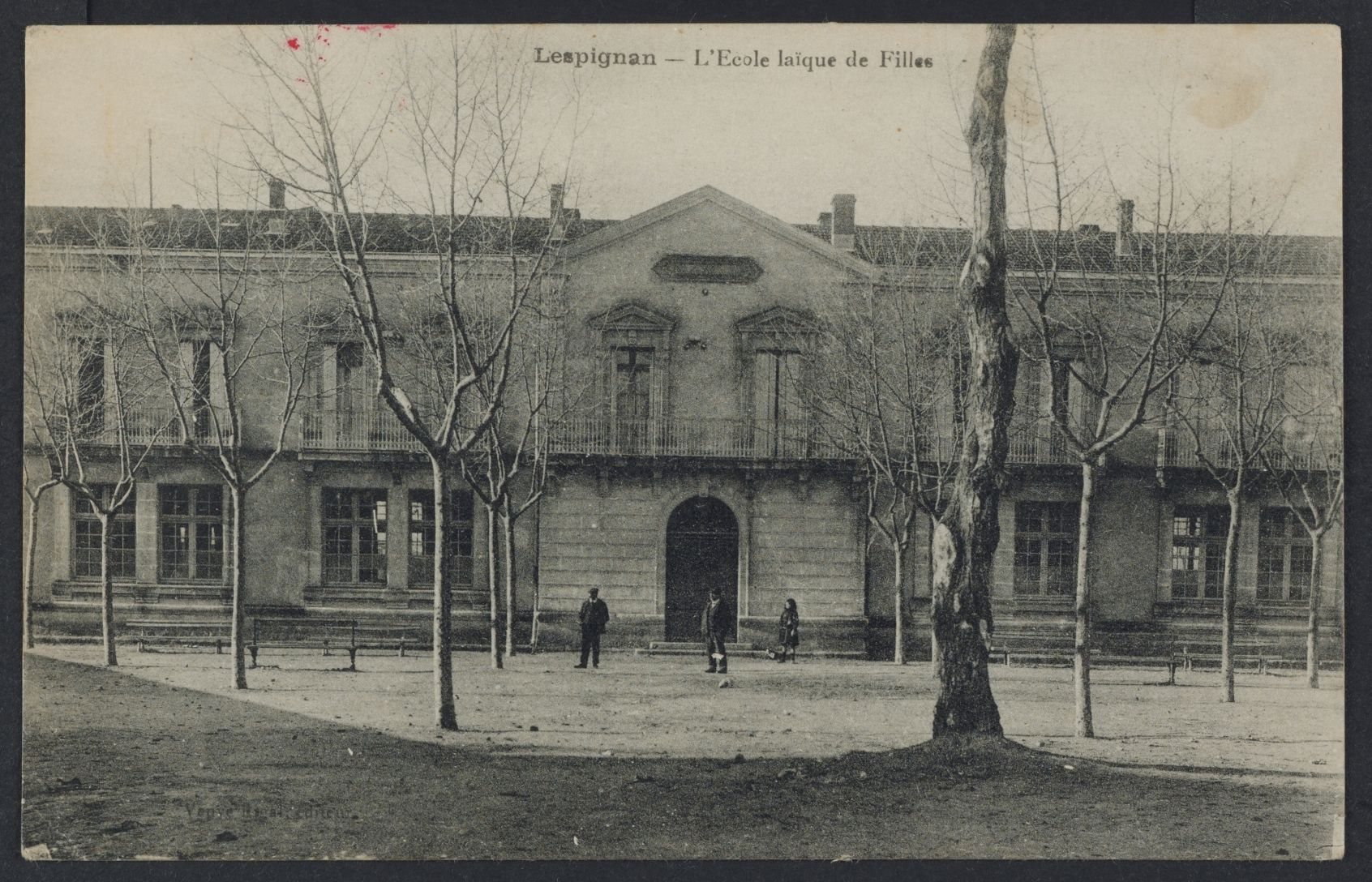
Postcard of the secular girls' school (late 19th - early 20th century).

The commune of Lespignan has two primary education establishments: the communal nursery school and the communal elementary school.

== Public services ==
The municipality has a post office on its territory.

== Local culture and heritage ==
=== Media ===
The local newspaper Midi Libre reports on certain events taking place in the town through its Béziers edition.

=== Places and monuments ===
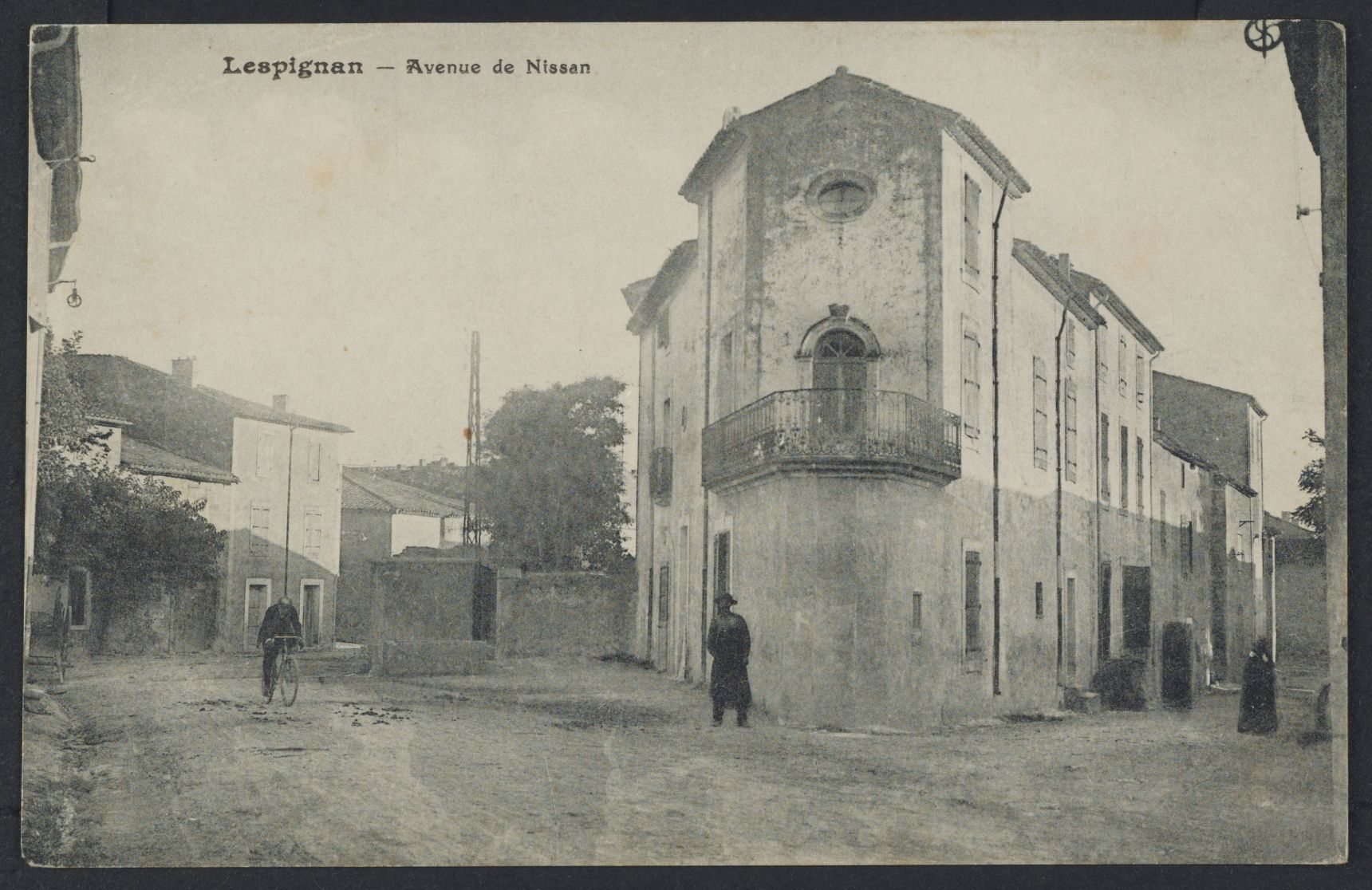
Postcard of Nissan Avenue (late 19th - early 20th century).

In Lespignan, there is only one complete church, that of Saint-Pierre-aux-Liens in the village center, dating from the 13th-14th centuries.

- Saint-Pierre Church in Lespignan. The choir and apse were listed as historical monuments in 1952. The building was listed as a historical monument in 1988.
- Former Saint-Pierre Church in Lespignan. The cemetery church, probably dating from the 9th century, is also dedicated to the apostle Saint Peter. It was restored in 1865 but subsequently abandoned, as it was located outside the village fortifications.

A document from 1154 mentions that the church of Lespignan belonged to the Cassan Monastery (Order of the Canons of Saint Augustine). In 1711, the Prior of Lespignan, François Médaille, handed over his benefice to the Bishop of Béziers, wishing to help his parishioners and the diocese. Thus, the title of Prior of Lespignan was abolished, replaced by a perpetual vicarage managed by the bishop upon presentation by the Commander of Cassan.

- Church of the Assumption of Our Lady of Lespignan.
- Private feudal castle with its tower belonging to the commune.

=== Festivals and events ===
==== The Matte la Zike festival ====
A music festival created in 2014, taking place in August. Many rock-oriented bands from Occitanie have performed there, including Barbeaux and Goulamas'k.

==== Shrove Tuesday ====
Young people go around the village and "collect" various foodstuffs.

==== 14 July ====
Created in 1983, it is a republican festival with balls, a lantern parade, fireworks, and various games (pétanque competitions, young pétanque players, all-around pétanque players, quadrathlons, and volleyball tournaments).

==== The local festival ====
Traditionally takes place on the first Sunday in August and lasts four or five days. Includes dances, pétanque competitions, and volleyball tournaments.

=== Twin cities ===
The village of Lespignan is twinned with:

- Chastre, Belgium

Officialized in 1985 in Lespignan, in 1986 in Chastre (Belgium). The twin town with an agricultural vocation is located in the south of Walloon Brabant. It is in fact an entity of seven villages (Chastre, Blanmont, Villeroux, Saint Gery, Gentinnes, Noirmont and Cortil). In total, 6,600 inhabitants and 3,132 hectares. School exchanges, inter-city visits, and visits periodically strengthen the relations between the two communes.

=== Heraldry ===
Arms of Lespignan	Vert, a lozenge saltire of Or and Azure.

== See also ==
- Communes of the Hérault department
