= Armissan =

Commune in Occitanie, France

- Commune
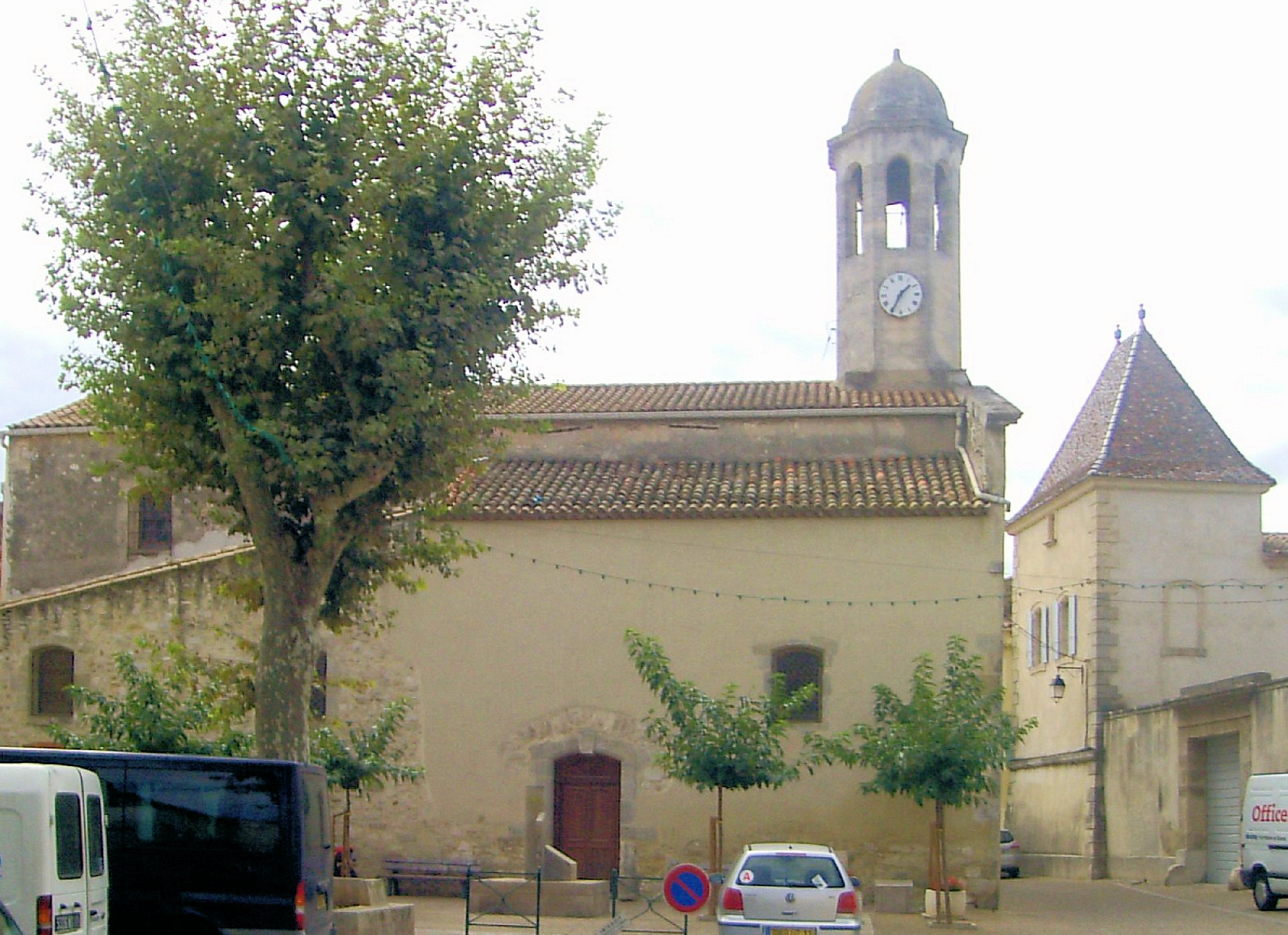
- Saint Etienne Church in Armissan

- Coat of arms
- Location of Armissan
- Location within France Location within Occitanie
- Coordinates: 43°11′17″N 3°05′50″E
- Country: France
- Region: Occitania
- Department: Aude
- Arrondissement: Narbonne
- Canton: Les Basses Plaines de l'Aude
- Intercommunality: Le Grand Narbonne

Government
  - Mayor (2022–2026): Gérard Lacombe
- Area^{1}: 12.51 km^{2} (4.83 sq mi)
- Highest elevation: 195 m (640 ft)
- Lowest elevation: 3 m (9.8 ft)
- Population (2023): 1,461
  - Density: 116.8/km^{2} (302.5/sq mi)
- Time zone: UTC+01:00 (CET)
  - Summer (DST): UTC+02:00 (CEST)
- INSEE/Postal code: 11014 /11110
- ^{1} French Land Register data, which excludes lakes, ponds, glaciers > 1 km^{2} (0.386 sq mi or 247 acres) and river estuaries.

Armissan (French pronunciation: [aʁmisɑ̃]; Occitan: Armissan) is a commune in the Aude department in the Occitanie region of southern France.

== Geography ==
Armissan is part of the urban area of Narbonne and is located just 2 km east of the city immediately south of Vinassan and inside the Regional Natural Park of Narbonne. Access to the commune is by road D68 from Narbonne passing through the town and continuing south-east to join the D168 to Narbonne-Plage at the southern border of the commune. The D168 from Narbonne to Narbonne-Plage also passes through the south of the commune. There is also the D31 going south from Vinasson through the west of the commune to join the D32. The A9 autoroute passes through the west of the commune but has no exit - the nearest exit is Exit 37 at Narbonne. The commune has large forests in the south-west and in the north with the rest of the commune farmland.

The Ruisseau Mayral with many tributaries flows through the village west to join a network of canals west of the A9.

== History ==
=== Heraldry ===
Arms of Armissan	Blazon: Ermine, in fesse fusilly Or and Azure.

== Administration ==
List of Successive Mayors

From	To	Name
2001	2020	Gérard Kerfyser
2020	2026	José Frere

== Demography ==
The inhabitants of the commune are known as Armissannais or Armissannaises in French.

Historical population

Year	Pop.	±% p.a.
1793	281	—
1821	443	+1.64%
1846	520	+0.64%
1872	633	+0.76%
1901	905	+1.24%
1926	846	−0.27%
1946	576	−1.90%
1962	636	+0.62%
1968	713	+1.92%

Year	Pop.	±% p.a.
1975	687	−0.53%
1982	935	+4.50%
1990	1,252	+3.72%
1999	1,211	−0.37%
2007	1,506	+2.76%
2012	1,547	+0.54%
2017	1,520	−0.35%
2023	1,461	−0.66%

Source: EHESS and INSEE

== Economy ==
The commune is part of the Languedoc AOC.

== Sites and monuments ==
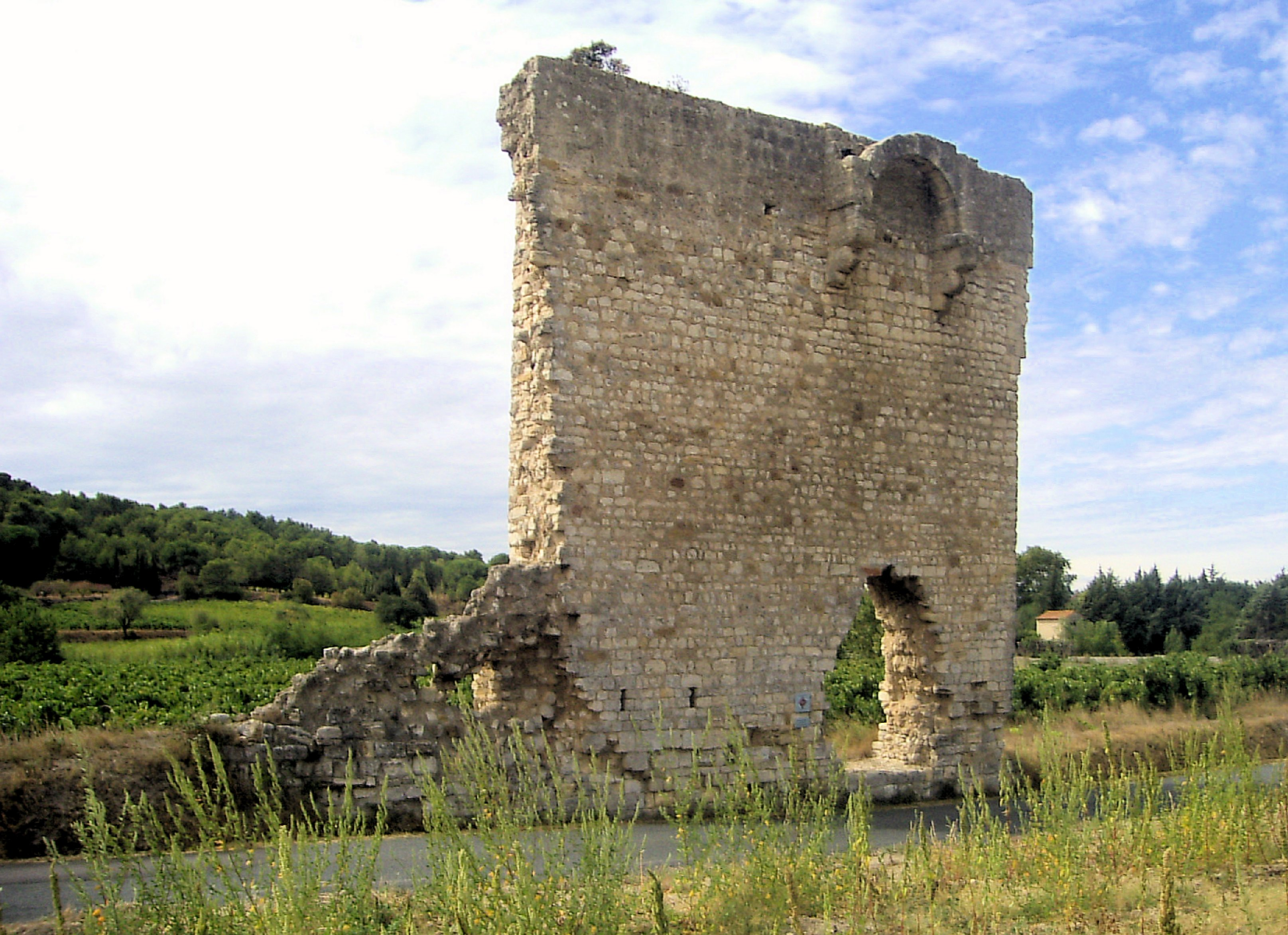
Remain of Saint Peter's church

- The Remains of the Church of Saint Peter (Middle Ages) are registered as an historical monument.
- The Chateau of Armissan
- The War Memorial (20th century) is registered as an historical object.

The Church of Saint-Etienne contains many items that are registered as historical objects:

- The Tombstone of René de Chefdebien (1615)
- Statues (18th-19th century)
- An Altar Painting: Saints Pierre and Etienne (17th century)
- A box for holy oils (1684)
- A Ciborium (1654)
- A Ciborium (17th century)
- A Bronze Bell (1732)
- A Sacristy Washbasin (15th century)
- A Statue/Reliquary: Saint Roch (18th century)
- 4 Altar Candlesticks and a Cross (17th century)
- 6 Altar Candlesticks and a Cross (17th century)

== See also ==
- Communes of the Aude department
