= Henry Fourès =

Henry Fourès (born 17 May 1948) is a French historian of music and musician.

== Life ==
Born in Coursan, Fourès first followed lessons of art history at the Paul Valéry University Montpellier 3 and musical studies at the Conservatoire de Paris where he won his First Prizes in music theory, music analysis, and composition. He then studied medieval musicology at the Berlin University of the Arts and the piano at the Academy of Fine Arts Vienna.

After being an intern at the Groupe de recherches musicales (GRM INA) from 1975 until 1977, he was appointed professor in charge of improvised music at the Conservatoire de Pantin from 1977 to 1980. He then taught the history of medieval music from 1980 to 1982 at the University of Toulouse le Mirail. In 1982 he was appointed Inspector General of Music responsible for teaching and then creation at the Direction générale de la Création artistique at the French Ministry of Culture. He left this position in 1990 to devote himself fully to his activities as a composer and performer. He was artistic director of the creative studio La Muse en circuit, then worked regularly in Germany (Potsdam, Berlin, Cologne, Frankfurt...) where he was invited to perform with various symphonic and radio ensembles.

His activities cover many areas. He has made films for television, composed music for image, dance and stage. He is also the author of numerous radio creations (France Culture) and the director of Hörspiel (radio drama) for the Hessischer Rundfunk and the Westdeutscher Rundfunk. He has written symphonic works, chamber music, electronic music pieces, mixed music, and vocal music, but has also designed and produced interactive installations and major events.

Fourès was director of the Conservatoire national supérieur de musique et de danse de Lyon from 2000 to 2009. He is also co-artistic director with composer Reinhard David Flender of the Franco-German OPUS XXI Academy of Chamber Music, which is dedicated to the contemporary repertoire.

== Selected works ==
=== Vocal music a cappella ===
- Cinq-six-onze for 11 vocal soloists (2002)
- Célébration de la mode for soprano and mixed choir (1992)
- Célébration de la fatigue for mixed choir (1990)

=== Vocal music with instruments ===
- Contrepoint, Three pieces for children's choir and organ (2009)
- L'espace des songes, for orchestra, traditional music ensemble and recordings (2007)
- Soleares for soprano, bass clarinet, percussion, piano and cello (2003)
- L'esclavage for mezzo-soprano, baritone and piano (1998)
- Maât for vocal and instrumental ensemble, tape and spatialization techniques (1988)
- Le bal de la contemporaine, dance music for instrumental ensemble and voice (1984)
- Poker d'âmes, Opera for amateur actors, orchestra, choir and soloists (1980/81)
- Icare etc. Opera for amateur actors, orchestra, choir and soloists (1980)
- Musique avec petit carré blanc for an indefinite number of participants (1976)

=== Electronic music ===
- Mittel Meer Meer der Mitte radio play (1999)
- Athina, Dance music (1994)
- Bonjour Monsieur Cueco, radio play (1984)
- Passe temps Film score for Jose Maria Bersoza (1984)
- Corazon 1. 2. 3. 4. 5. 6. Dance music (1982–1988)
- Entre temps Film score for Jose Maria Bersoza (1982)
- Le miroir des jours, incidental music (1979)
- La galina incidental music (1978)
- La lune de Peyrerepertuise Radiofeature (1976)

=== Music for instrumental ensemble ===
- Méditation sur le scorpion for string quartet (2004)
- Sommerbericht for seven percussionists (2001)
- Trio (2) for juggler, percussion and piano (1997)
- Le livre des traditions, Concert spectacle for seven performers (1993)
- La leçon de composition, Concert spectacle for 2 comedians, one comedian and six musicians (1992)
- Musica Ficta n° 7 for brass quintet (1988)
- Ô lac ! for Big Band (1988)
- Opus open for tuba and cembalo (1987)
- Cosi fa la boum for 17 performers (1985)
- 42 rue d'Alayrac for piano, clarinet and percussion (1985)
- Musica Ficta n° 3, Pays Paysage for indefinite ensemble (1984)
- Coda for 14 instruments (1981)

=== Solo pieces ===
- Pour la flûte à bec for alto flute (2009)
- Célébration de la caresse n° 2 for tambourine (1999)
- Vom Blau for double bass (1999)
- Kristall for alto saxophone (1999)
- Gegenlicht for bass clarinet (1998)
- Célébration du fa for piano (1992)
- Ô feu ! for tambourine, tape and pyrotechnics (1986)
- Interview n° 1 for tenor saxophone (or bass clarinet) and tape (1976)

== Bibliography ==
- Henry Fourès, "La créativité: espace médian de la connaissance et de l'apprentissage", in Orphée apprenti, no. 1, Éditions du Conseil supérieur de la Musique, Brussels, October 2009.
- —, "Ce qu'a vu le Cers und À la recherche du rythme perdu, zwei Arbeiten mit dem Komponisten Luc Ferrari" in La revue Filigrane, no. 8: Jazz, musiques improvisées et écritures contemporaines : convergences et antinomies, Éditions Delatour, Paris 2008.
- —, lead article "L'atelier du temps", in Vers une sémiotique du temps dans les arts, actes du colloque: Ircam-Delatour, Paris, December 2005.

== Discography (selection) ==
- Henry Fourès, Carlo Rizzo, Beñat Achiary, Célébration du contre-jour, 1 CD Radio France, Harmonia Mundi, 2007.
- Henry Fourès, Célébration de la caresse, Gegenlicht, Kristall, Célébration de l'oiseau, Vom Blau, Célébration du fa; Françoise Kluber, voice; Dominique My, piano; Bernard Cazauran, double bass; Carlo Rizzo, tambourine; Jean-Pierre Caens, alto saxophon; Claude Crousier, bass clarinet, 1 CD MFA, l'empreinte digitale.
- Henry Fourès, Athina, György Kurtág, synthesizer; Patrick Moutal, zither/surbahar; Carlo Rizzo, tambourine; Pablo Cueco and Patrick Moutal, lute; 1 CD Compagnie Accrorap, Musidisc, 1995, no. MU 750.
- Henry Fourès, Interview no. 1; 9, Rue Colbert, Jules Calmettes, saxophone/flute; Henry Fourès, piano, 1 CD Adda, 1988 (1st ed. on LP 1980), no. ADDA 581088.
