= Léon Escalaïs =

French opera singer (1859–1940)

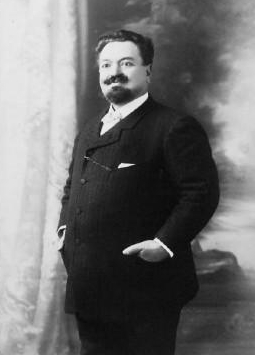
Léon Escalais

Léon Escalaïs (August 8, 1859, Cuxac-d'Aude – November 8, 1940, Cuxac-d'Aude) was a prominent French tenor, particularly associated with French and Italian heroic roles. His lean, nimble and powerful voice was noted for the ease and brilliance of its upper register.

== Life and career ==
Born Léonce-Antoine Escalaïs, he commenced his vocal studies as a young man at the Music Conservatory of Toulouse, where he won prizes for singing and opera performance. He continued his studies at the Paris Conservatory with two well-known teachers of the day, Crosti and Obin, prior to making his professional debut at the Théâtre du Château (Paris) in 1882, in Sardanapale by Jean-Baptiste Duvernoy.

Escalaïs was offered a contract by the Paris Opéra. His first appearance with the Paris Opéra at the Palais Garnier occurred in 1883, as Arnold in Guillaume Tell. (Arnold would become one of his signature roles.)

Two years later, he sang for the first time at the Théâtre de la Monnaie in Brussels, and he made his debut at La Scala, Milan, in 1888. He left the Paris Opéra in 1892 after a dispute with management and accepted engagements in Dijon, Lyon, Marseille and Italy. Among the taxing roles which he undertook were Eléazar in La Juive, Robert in Robert le diable, Raoul in Les Huguenots, Vasco in L'Africaine and the title parts in Le Cid and Sigurd.

Between 1892 and 1908, Escalaïs sang more often in Italy than he did in his native land. He added to his repertoire such Verdi roles as Manrico in Il trovatore, Radamès in Aida and the title part in Otello. Consequently, he was sometimes described as "the French Tamagno" (after Francesco Tamagno, the Italian heroic tenor).

Escalaïs rejoined the Paris Opéra in 1908. The following year, he sang as a guest artist at the New Orleans Opera House. These would be his only performances in the United States. He retired from the stage in 1912 while still in good voice and was appointed to the Legion of Honour by the French Government in 1927. In retirement, he gave private singing lessons. One of his students was José Luccioni, an outstanding dramatic tenor of the 1930s and '40s. Escalaïs died in Cuxac-d'Aude during the Second World War, aged 82.

== Vocal characteristics & recordings ==
Escalais's many successes were achieved in spite of his being handicapped by a short, dumpy physique which was often at odds with the heroic stature of the characters that he portrayed on stage. The impressive quality of his voice compensated for any physical drawbacks, however. It was strong, bright in tone, with effortless top notes (including a potent high D) and showed remarkable flexibility. He also had a fluent command of traditional bel canto ornaments such as trills and runs. This type of agile yet robust dramatic tenor voice is now rare, which makes the gramophone discs that he cut in Milan in 1905–06 for Fonotipia Records of considerable interest to musicologists and vocal students.

Both the Preiser and Symposium companies have released CD anthologies devoted to Escalaïs.

== Sources ==
- Roland Mancini and Jean-Jacques Rouveroux (originally H. Rosenthal and J. Warrack), French edition, Guide de l’opéra, Les indispensables de la musique (Fayard, 1995). ISBN 2-213-59567-4.
- Leo Riemens, liner notes to Leonce Escalais, Lebendige Vergangenheit Compact Disc 89527 (Preiser, Austria, 2000).
- Michael Scott, The Record of Singing, Volume One (Duckworth, London, 1977).
- John Steane, The Grand Tradition: 70 years of Singing on Disc, (Duckworth, London, 1974).
- Jean-Pierre Mouchon, "Le ténor Léon Escalaïs (1859-1940). I. Sa vie et sa carrière. Illustrations de Serge Escalaïs" in "Étude" n°38, mai-juin-juillet-août 2007 (Association internationale de chant lyrique TITTA RUFFO, website: titta-ruffo-international.jimdo.com).
- Jean-Pierre Mouchon, "Chronologie de la carrière du ténor Léon Escalaïs" in "Étude" n°42, septembre-octobre-novembre-décembre 2008 (Association internationale de chant lyrique TITTA RUFFO, site: titta-ruffo-international.jimdo.com).
- Jean-Pierre Mouchon, "Le ténor Léonce Escalaïs" (Édilivre, Saint-Denis, France, 207 pages, ill., 2014).
- Serge Escalaïs, website: https://www.normandie-visuels.fr/escalais/
