= Coursan =

Commune in Occitanie, France

- Commune
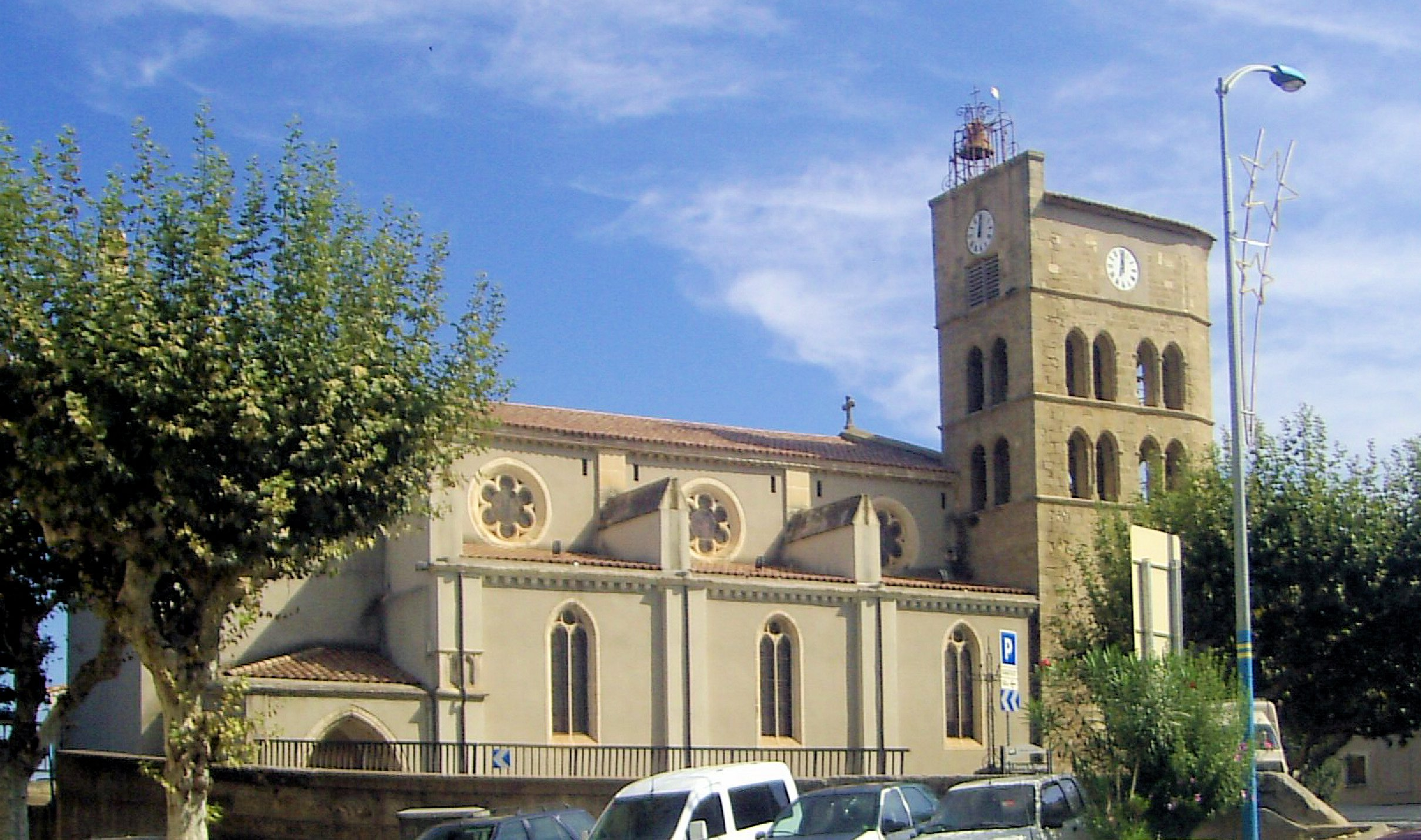
- The church in Coursan

- Coat of arms
- Location of Coursan
- Location within France Location within Occitanie
- Coordinates: 43°13′57″N 3°03′32″E
- Country: France
- Region: Occitania
- Department: Aude
- Arrondissement: Narbonne
- Canton: Les Basses Plaines de l'Aude
- Intercommunality: Grand Narbonne

Government
  - Mayor (2020–2026): Edouard Rocher
- Area^{1}: 24.61 km^{2} (9.50 sq mi)
- Highest elevation: 14 m (46 ft)
- Lowest elevation: 0 m (0 ft)
- Population (2023): 5,737
  - Density: 233.1/km^{2} (603.8/sq mi)
- Time zone: UTC+01:00 (CET)
  - Summer (DST): UTC+02:00 (CEST)
- INSEE/Postal code: 11106 /11110
- ^{1} French Land Register data, which excludes lakes, ponds, glaciers > 1 km^{2} (0.386 sq mi or 247 acres) and river estuaries.

Coursan (French pronunciation: [kuʁsɑ̃]; Occitan: Corçan) is a commune in the Aude department in southern France. Coursan station has rail connections to Narbonne, Béziers and Montpellier.

It is 7 km from Narbonne on the river Aude. There is a bridge built in the fifteenth century, over which passes the RN9 road. The town has a church from the same period which is in the course of being restored.

Composer Henry Fourès was born in Coursan (17 May 1948)

== Population ==
Historical population

Year	Pop.	±% p.a.
1793	1,440	—
1800	1,436	−0.04%
1806	1,414	−0.26%
1821	1,630	+0.95%
1831	1,761	+0.78%
1836	1,850	+0.99%
1841	2,022	+1.79%
1846	2,040	+0.18%
1851	2,172	+1.26%
1856	2,231	+0.54%
1861	2,154	−0.70%
1866	2,477	+2.83%
1872	2,538	+0.41%
1876	2,709	+1.64%
1881	3,458	+5.00%
1886	3,786	+1.83%
1891	3,847	+0.32%
1896	3,767	−0.42%
1901	3,829	+0.33%

Year	Pop.	±% p.a.
1906	3,802	−0.14%
1911	3,793	−0.05%
1921	4,121	+0.83%
1926	4,273	+0.73%
1931	4,438	+0.76%
1936	3,589	−4.16%
1946	3,271	−0.92%
1954	3,228	−0.17%
1962	3,212	−0.06%
1968	3,366	+0.78%
1975	3,334	−0.14%
1982	4,021	+2.71%
1990	5,137	+3.11%
1999	5,241	+0.22%
2007	6,166	+2.05%
2012	6,056	−0.36%
2017	5,908	−0.49%
2023	5,737	−0.49%

Source: EHESS and INSEE (1968-2023)

== See also ==
- Communes of the Aude department
- List of medieval bridges in France
