= Canton of Les Basses Plaines de l'Aude =

Coordinates: 43°14′N 3°4′E

- Canton
- Situation of the canton of Les Basses Plaines de l'Aude in the department of Aude
- Country: France
- Region: Occitania
- Department: Aude
- No. of communes: {{{nbcomm}}}
- Population (2023): 21,554
- INSEE code: 1106

The canton of Les Basses Plaines de l'Aude (before 2015: canton of Coursan) is an administrative unit in the Aude department, southern France. Its seat is in the town Coursan. The canton consists of 6 communes:

1. Armissan
2. Coursan
3. Cuxac-d'Aude
4. Fleury
5. Salles-d'Aude
6. Vinassan
