= Cuxac-d'Aude =

Commune in Occitanie, France

- Commune
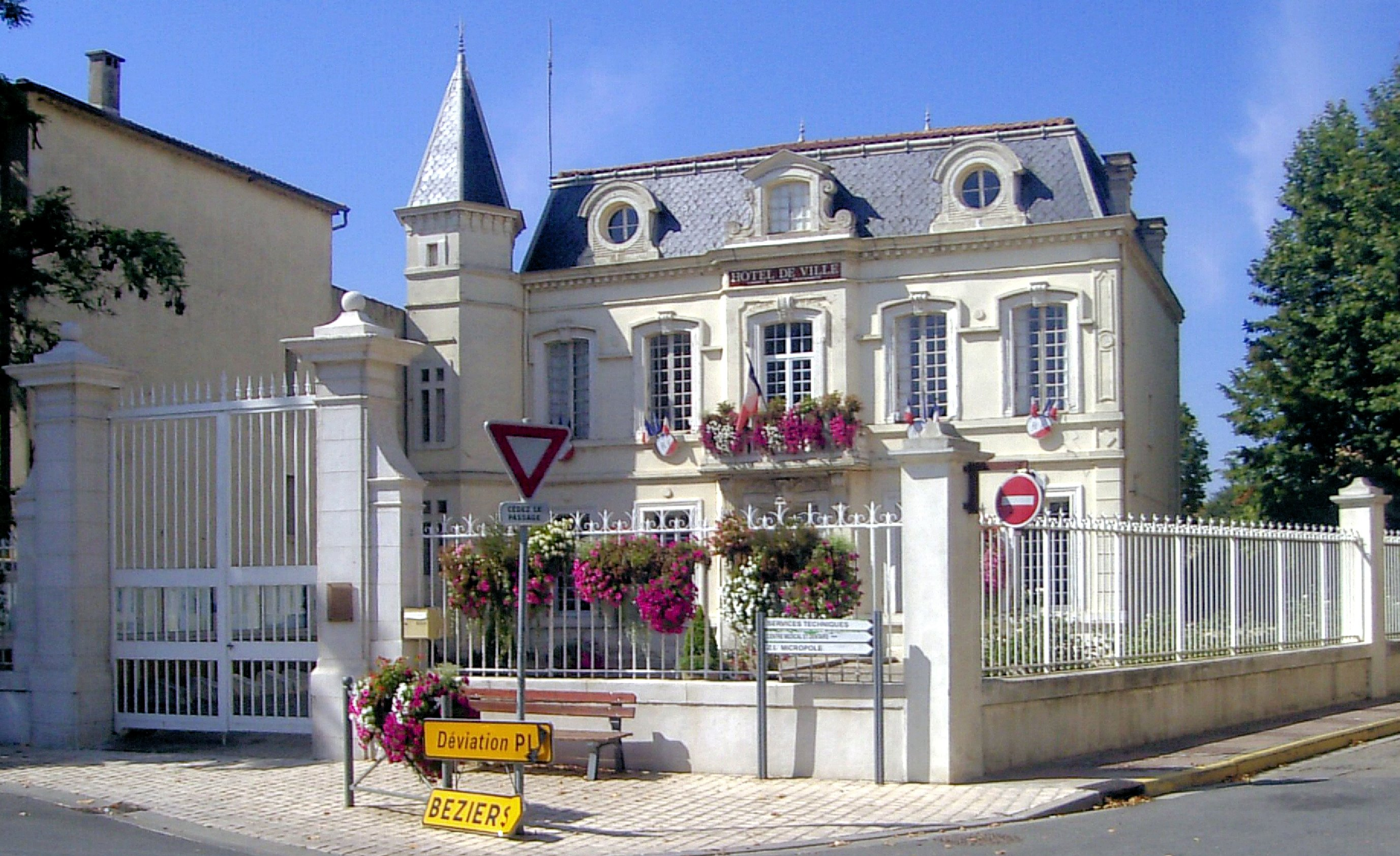
- Town hall

- Coat of arms
- Location of Cuxac-d'Aude
- Location within France Location within Occitanie
- Coordinates: 43°14′47″N 3°00′00″E
- Country: France
- Region: Occitania
- Department: Aude
- Arrondissement: Narbonne
- Canton: Les Basses Plaines de l'Aude
- Intercommunality: Grand Narbonne

Government
  - Mayor (2022–2026): Gregory Delfour
- Area^{1}: 21.54 km^{2} (8.32 sq mi)
- Elevation: 8 m (26 ft)
- Highest elevation: 48 m (157 ft)
- Lowest elevation: 0 m (0 ft)
- Population (2023): 4,079
  - Density: 189.4/km^{2} (490.5/sq mi)
- Time zone: UTC+01:00 (CET)
  - Summer (DST): UTC+02:00 (CEST)
- INSEE/Postal code: 11116 /11590
- ^{1} French Land Register data, which excludes lakes, ponds, glaciers > 1 km^{2} (0.386 sq mi or 247 acres) and river estuaries.

Cuxac-d'Aude (French pronunciation: [kyksak dod]; Occitan: Cucçac d'Aude) is a commune in the Aude department in southern France.

The French operatic tenor Léon Escalaïs was born and died in Cuxac-d'Aude.

== Population ==
Historical population
Year	Pop.	±% p.a.
1968	2,314	—
1975	2,490	+1.05%
1982	3,014	+2.77%
1990	3,998	+3.59%
1999	4,272	+0.74%
2007	4,343	+0.21%
2012	3,991	−1.68%
2017	4,030	+0.19%
2023	4,079	+0.20%
Source: INSEE

== See also ==
- Communes of the Aude department
