= Salles-d'Aude =

Commune in Occitanie, France

- Commune
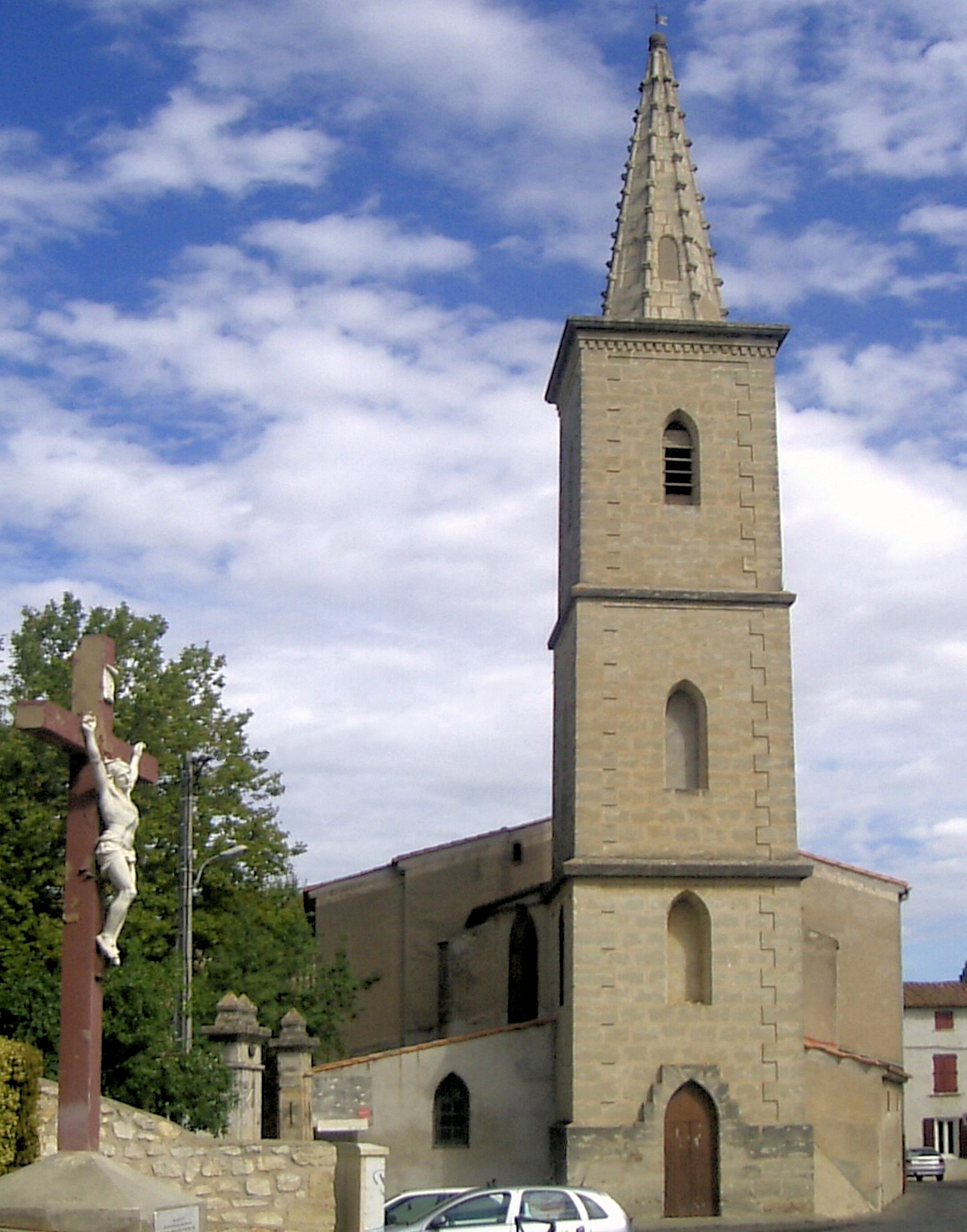
- The Chapel of the Penitents in Salles-d'Aude

- Coat of arms
- Location of Salles-d'Aude
- Location within France Location within Occitanie
- Coordinates: 43°14′21″N 3°07′14″E
- Country: France
- Region: Occitania
- Department: Aude
- Arrondissement: Narbonne
- Canton: Les Basses Plaines de l'Aude
- Intercommunality: Grand Narbonne

Government
  - Mayor (2020–2026): Jean-Luc Rivel
- Area^{1}: 18.15 km^{2} (7.01 sq mi)
- Elevation: 12 m (39 ft)
- Highest elevation: 87 m (285 ft)
- Lowest elevation: 2 m (6.6 ft)
- Population (2023): 3,369
  - Density: 185.6/km^{2} (480.8/sq mi)
- Time zone: UTC+01:00 (CET)
  - Summer (DST): UTC+02:00 (CEST)
- INSEE/Postal code: 11370 /11110
- ^{1} French Land Register data, which excludes lakes, ponds, glaciers > 1 km^{2} (0.386 sq mi or 247 acres) and river estuaries.

Salles-d'Aude (French pronunciation: [sal dod]; Occitan: Salas d'Aude) is a commune in the Aude department in southern France.

== Population ==
Historical population
Year	Pop.	±% p.a.
1968	1,382	—
1975	1,395	+0.13%
1982	1,510	+1.14%
1990	1,710	+1.57%
1999	1,902	+1.19%
2007	2,486	+3.40%
2012	3,041	+4.11%
2017	3,255	+1.37%
2023	3,369	+0.58%
Source: INSEE

== See also ==
- Communes of the Aude department
