= Fleury, Aude =

Commune in Occitanie, France

Fleury
- Commune
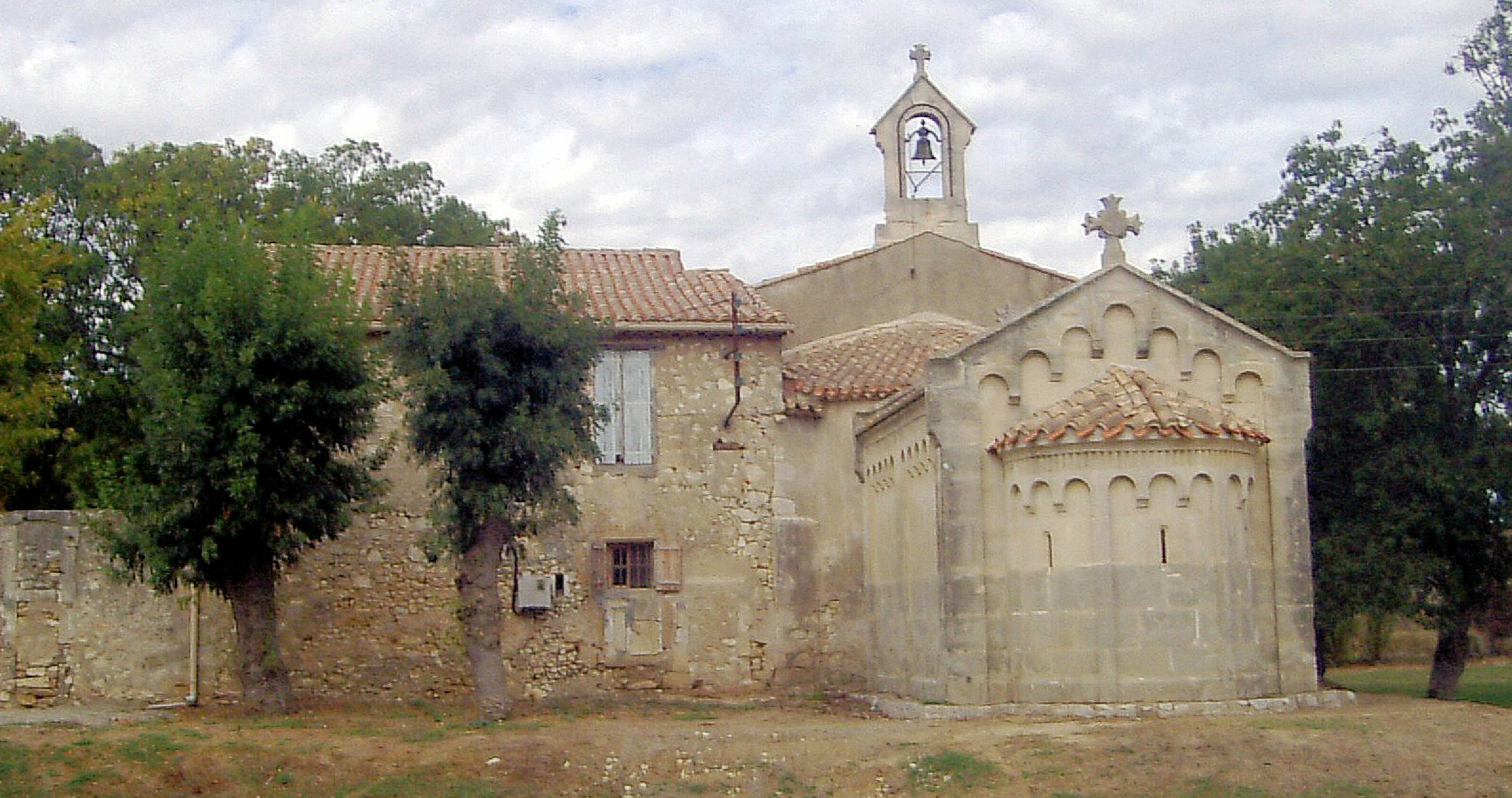
- The chapel of Liesse in Fleury

- Coat of arms
- Location of Fleury
- Location within France Location within Occitanie
- Coordinates: 43°13′50″N 3°08′07″E
- Country: France
- Region: Occitania
- Department: Aude
- Arrondissement: Narbonne
- Canton: Les Basses Plaines de l'Aude
- Intercommunality: Grand Narbonne

Government
  - Mayor (2020–2026): André-Luc Montagnier
- Area^{1}: 51.27 km^{2} (19.80 sq mi)
- Elevation: 35 m (115 ft)
- Highest elevation: 163 m (535 ft)
- Lowest elevation: 0 m (0 ft)
- Population (2023): 4,246
  - Density: 82.82/km^{2} (214.5/sq mi)
- Time zone: UTC+01:00 (CET)
  - Summer (DST): UTC+02:00 (CEST)
- INSEE/Postal code: 11145 /11560
- ^{1} French Land Register data, which excludes lakes, ponds, glaciers > 1 km^{2} (0.386 sq mi or 247 acres) and river estuaries.

Fleury (French pronunciation: [flœʁi] or [fløʁi]; Occitan: Fluris, [flyˈɾis]), unofficially Fleury-d'Aude for disambiguation, is a commune in the Aude department, in the administrative region of Occitania, southern France.

== Population ==
Historical population
Year	Pop.	±% p.a.
1968	2,030	—
1975	1,877	−1.11%
1982	2,027	+1.10%
1990	2,264	+1.39%
1999	2,547	+1.32%
2007	3,146	+2.68%
2012	3,812	+3.92%
2017	3,825	+0.07%
2023	4,246	+1.76%
Source: INSEE

== See also ==
- Communes of the Aude department
