= Vinassan =

Commune in Occitanie, France

- Commune
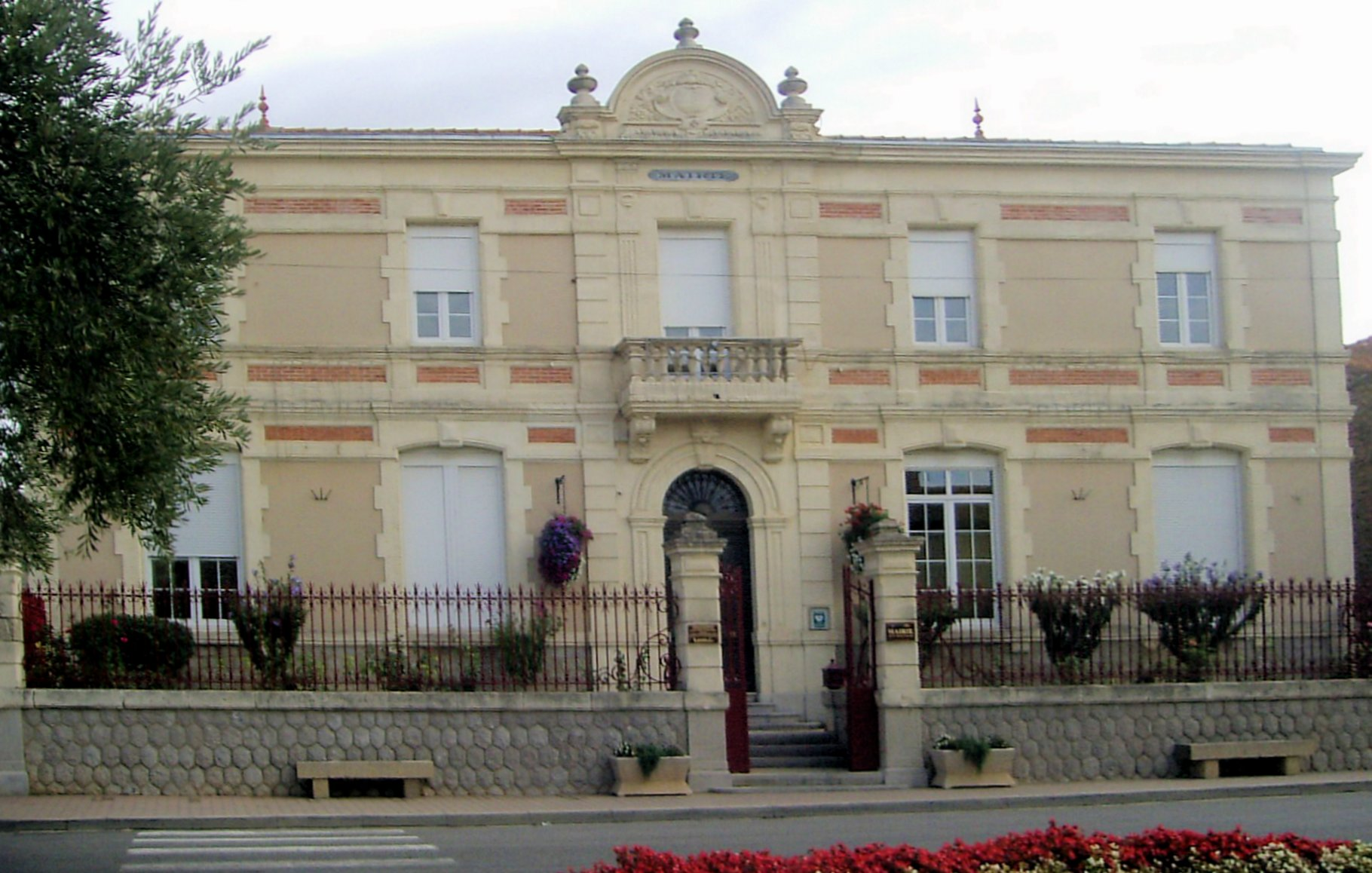
- Town hall

- Coat of arms
- Location of Vinassan
- Location within France Location within Occitanie
- Coordinates: 43°12′16″N 3°04′29″E
- Country: France
- Region: Occitania
- Department: Aude
- Arrondissement: Narbonne
- Canton: Les Basses Plaines de l'Aude
- Intercommunality: Grand Narbonne

Government
  - Mayor (2020–2026): Didier Aldebert
- Area^{1}: 8.96 km^{2} (3.46 sq mi)
- Elevation: 15 m (49 ft)
- Highest elevation: 142 m (466 ft)
- Lowest elevation: 3 m (9.8 ft)
- Population (2023): 2,662
  - Density: 297/km^{2} (769/sq mi)
- Time zone: UTC+01:00 (CET)
  - Summer (DST): UTC+02:00 (CEST)
- INSEE/Postal code: 11441 /11110
- ^{1} French Land Register data, which excludes lakes, ponds, glaciers > 1 km^{2} (0.386 sq mi or 247 acres) and river estuaries.

Vinassan (French pronunciation: [vinasɑ̃]; Occitan: Vinaçan) is a commune in the Aude department in southern France.

== Population ==
Historical population
Year	Pop.	±% p.a.
1968	817	—
1975	878	+1.03%
1982	980	+1.58%
1990	1,427	+4.81%
1999	2,004	+3.85%
2007	2,218	+1.28%
2012	2,549	+2.82%
2017	2,646	+0.75%
2023	2,662	+0.10%
Source: INSEE

== See also ==
- Communes of the Aude department
