= Action in Chains =

Sculpture by Aristide Maillol

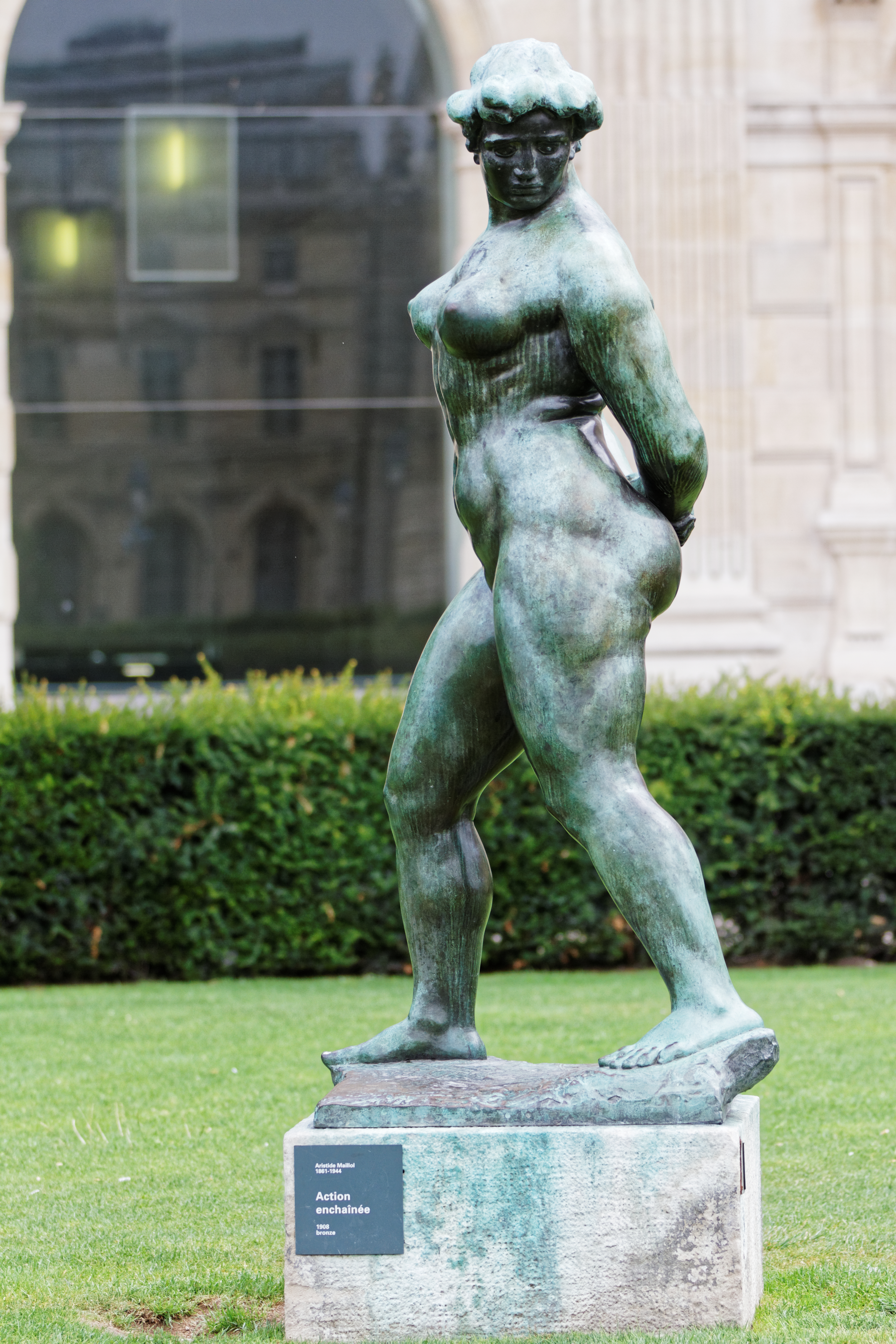
copy at Tuileries Garden

Action in Chains is a 1905 bronze sculpture by Aristide Maillol. The original called Monument to Blanqui was commissioned by Louis Auguste Blanqui, and resides at the Puget-Théniers, for which it was originally commissioned.

== Secondary casts and related artworks ==
- Bronze casts (2.15m height) at :

- Musée d'Orsay, displayed since 1964 mat Tuileries Garden as part of a series of works by Maillol on open-air display
- Caracas Museum of Contemporary Art (1906)
- Österreichische Galerie Belvedere
- Hirshhorn Museum and Sculpture Garden
- Hakone Open-Air Museum
- Norton Simon Museum
- Private collection (Sale by Dina Vierny, Christie's, 2005);
- Billy Rose Collection, Israel Museum

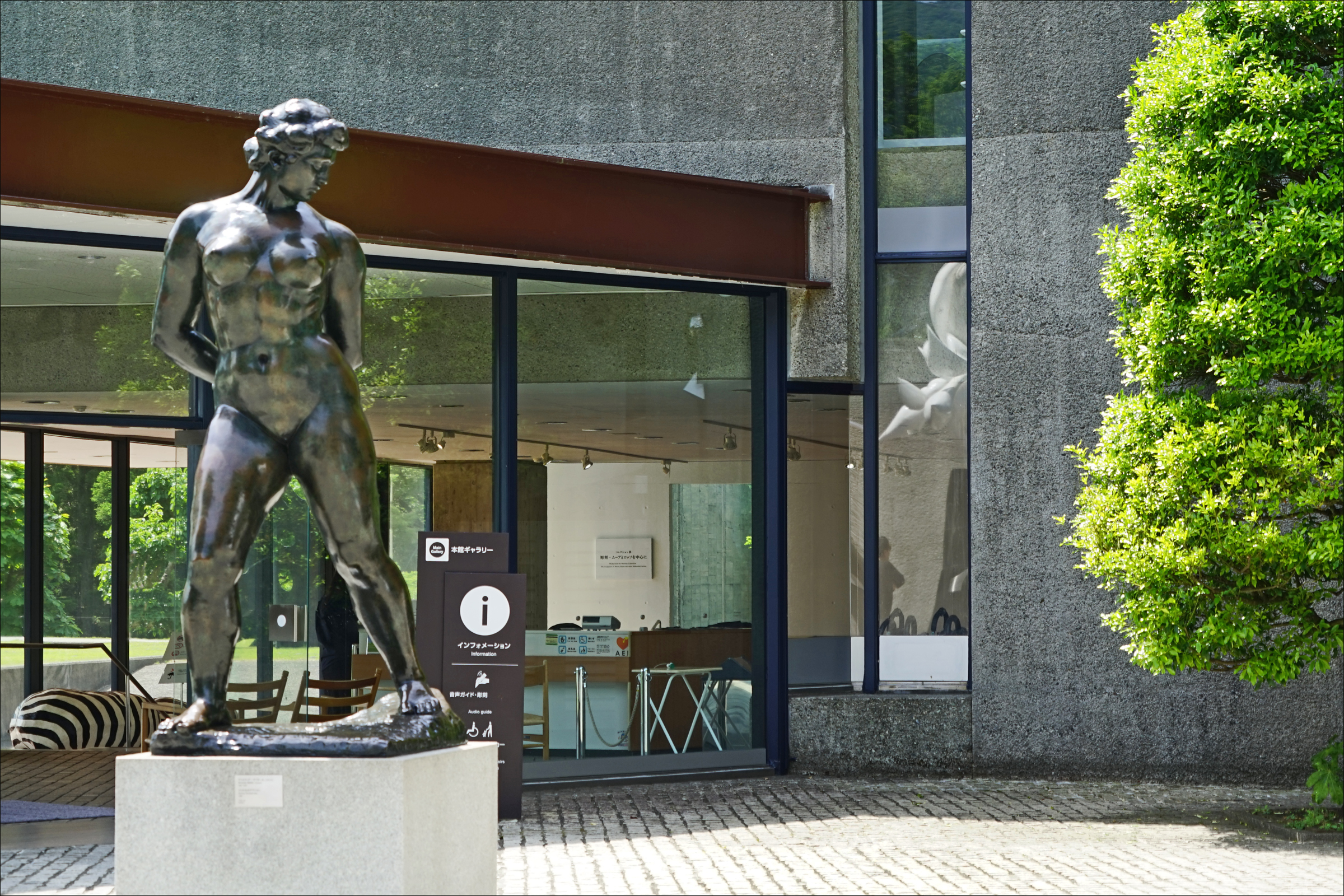
copy at Hakone Open-Air Museum

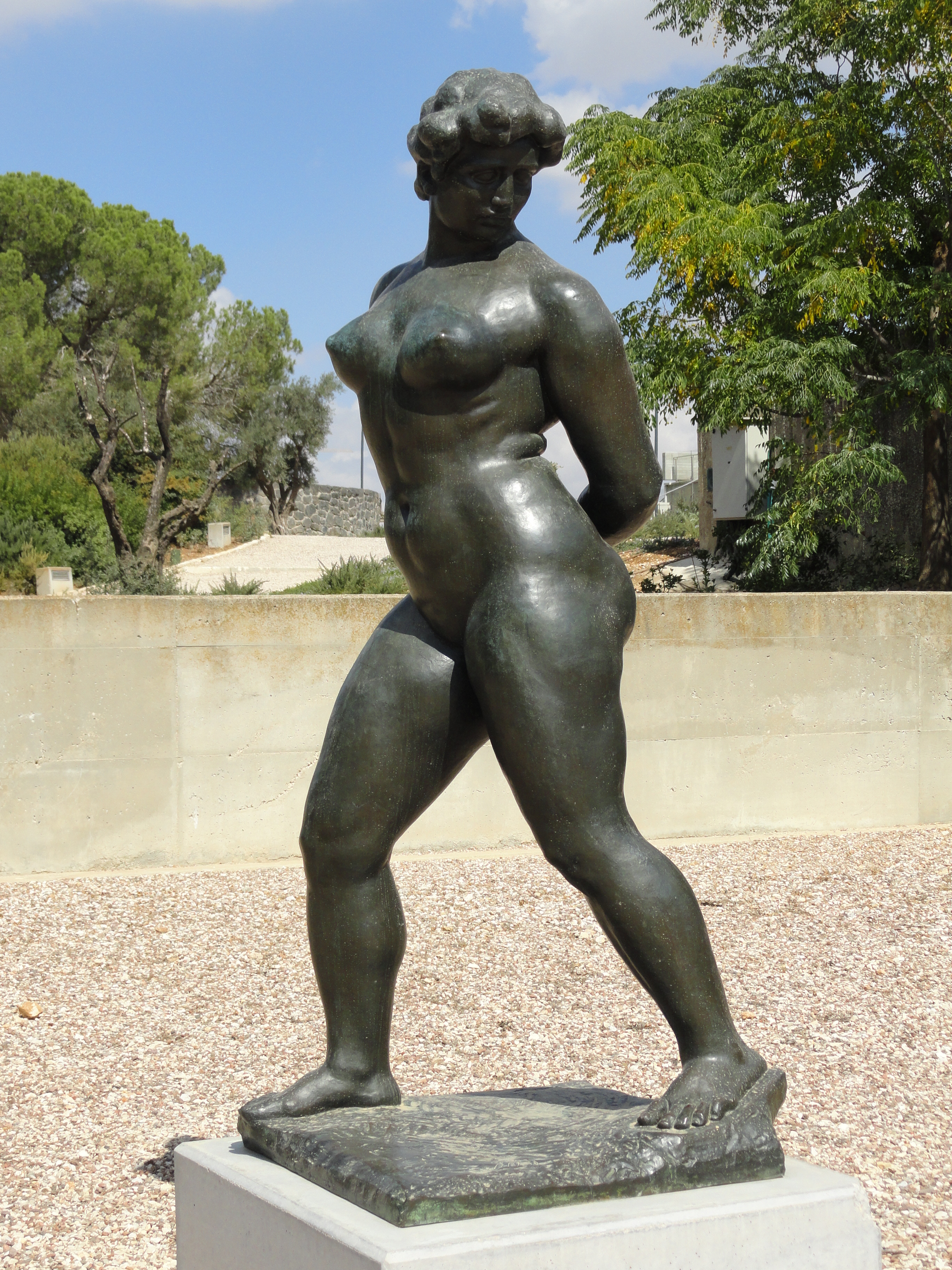
copy at Billy Rose Collection, Israel Museum

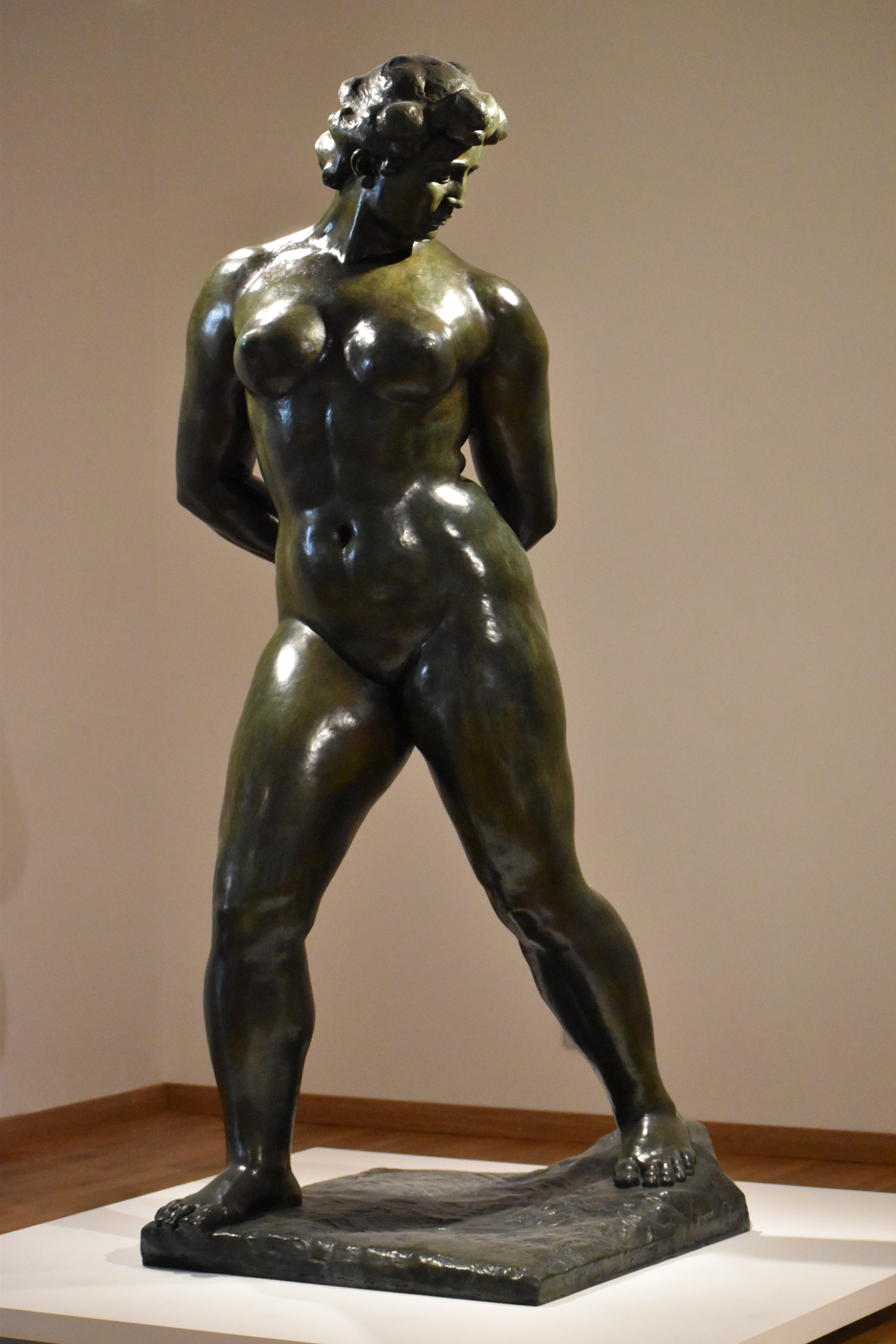
copy from private collection, at an art show at Perpignan
- Bronze versions without arms (2.15m height):

- Collection Dina Vierny, Paris;
- Private collection at city of Perpignan, displayed at Banyuls-sur-Mer.

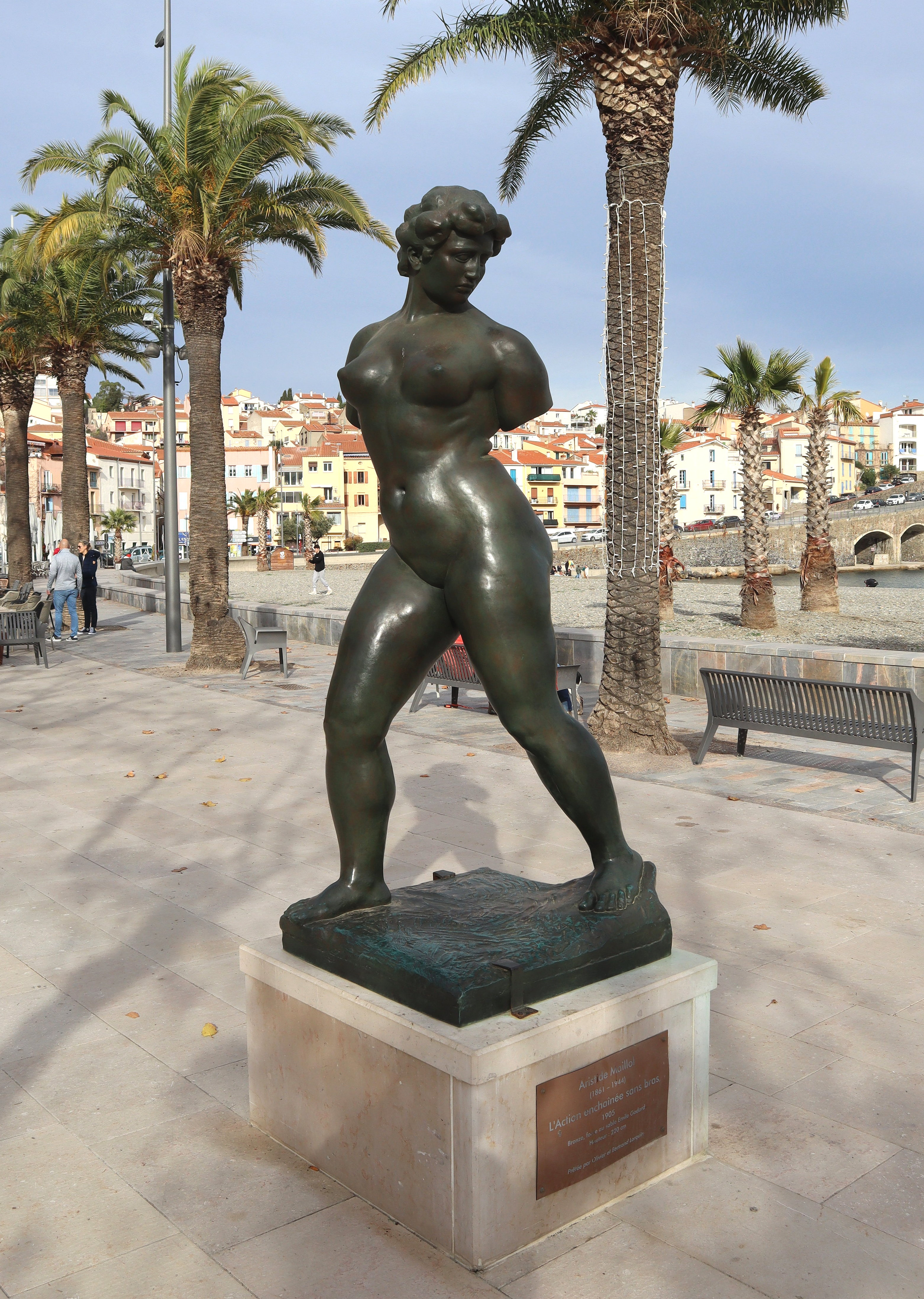
copy from Banyuls-sur-Mer
- Bronze torso:

- Kunstmuseum Basel
- Art Institute of Chicago
- Tate Gallery
- Metropolitan Museum of Art
- City of Perpignan;
- Collection Oskar Reinhart, Winterthur;
- Private collection.

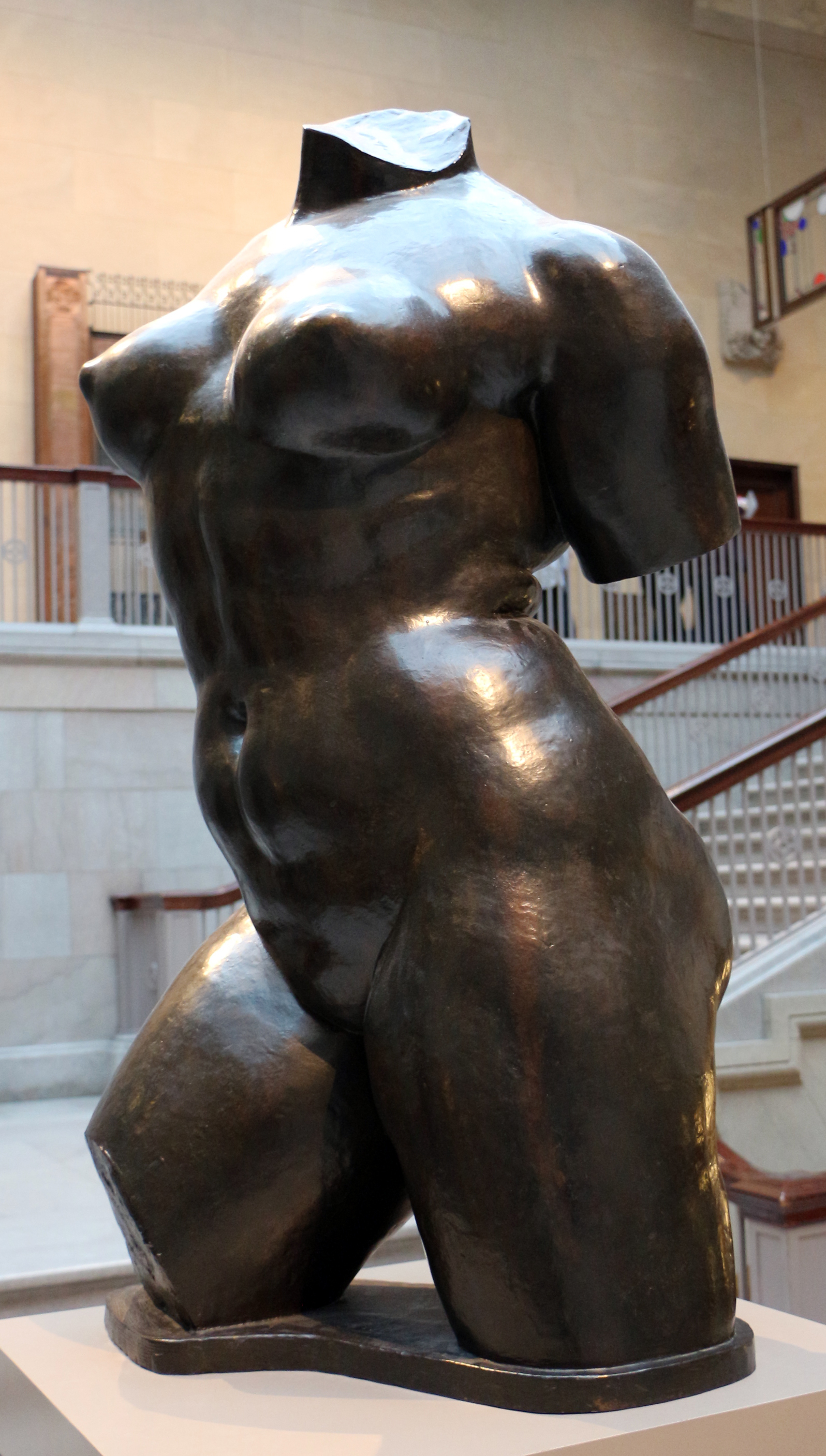
copy at Art Institute of Chicago
- Other:

- Bronze study without arms (33 cm height) at Metropolitan Museum of Art
- Charcoal Drawing at Metropolitan Museum of Art
- Plaster cast (2.15 m height) at Musée Maillol

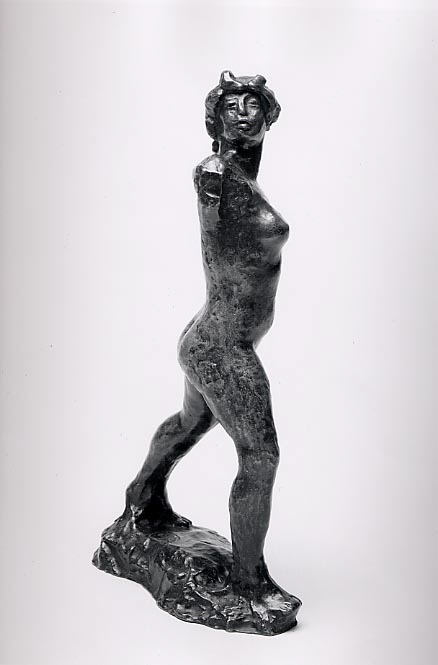
copy at Metropolitan Museum of Art

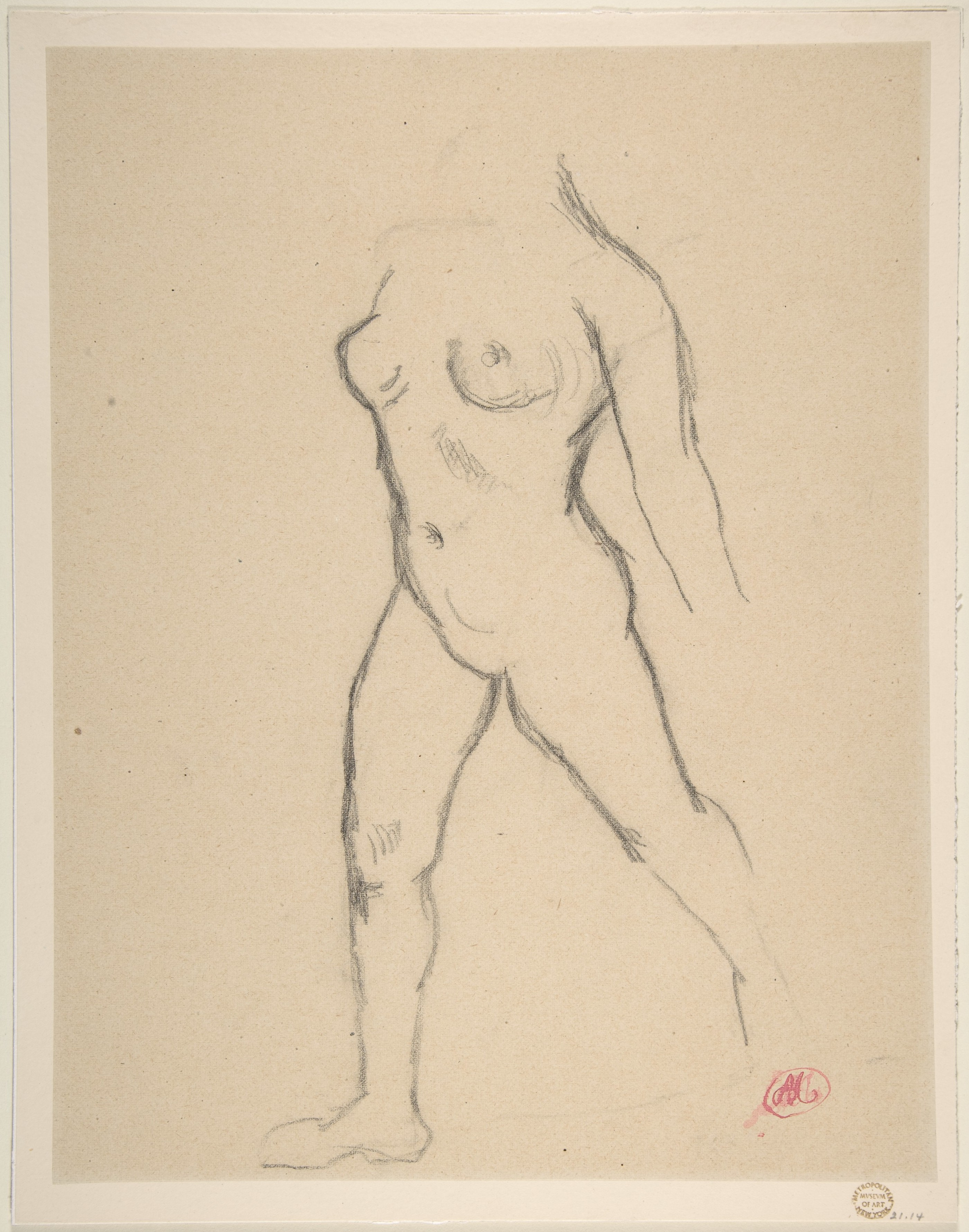
drawing at Metropolitan Museum of Art

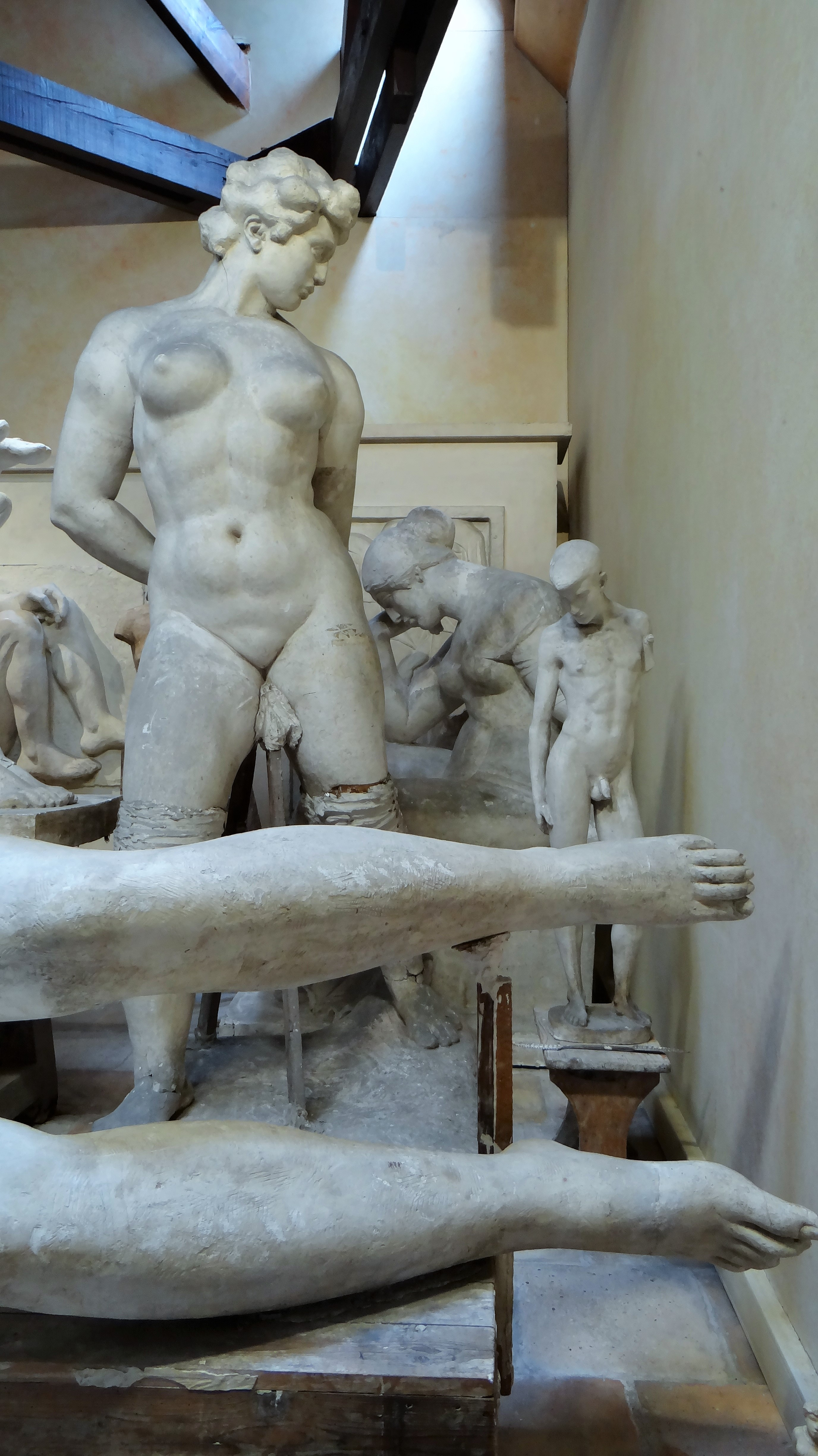
Plaster cast at Musée Maillol
