= The Mountain (Maillol) =

Sculpture by Aristide Maillol

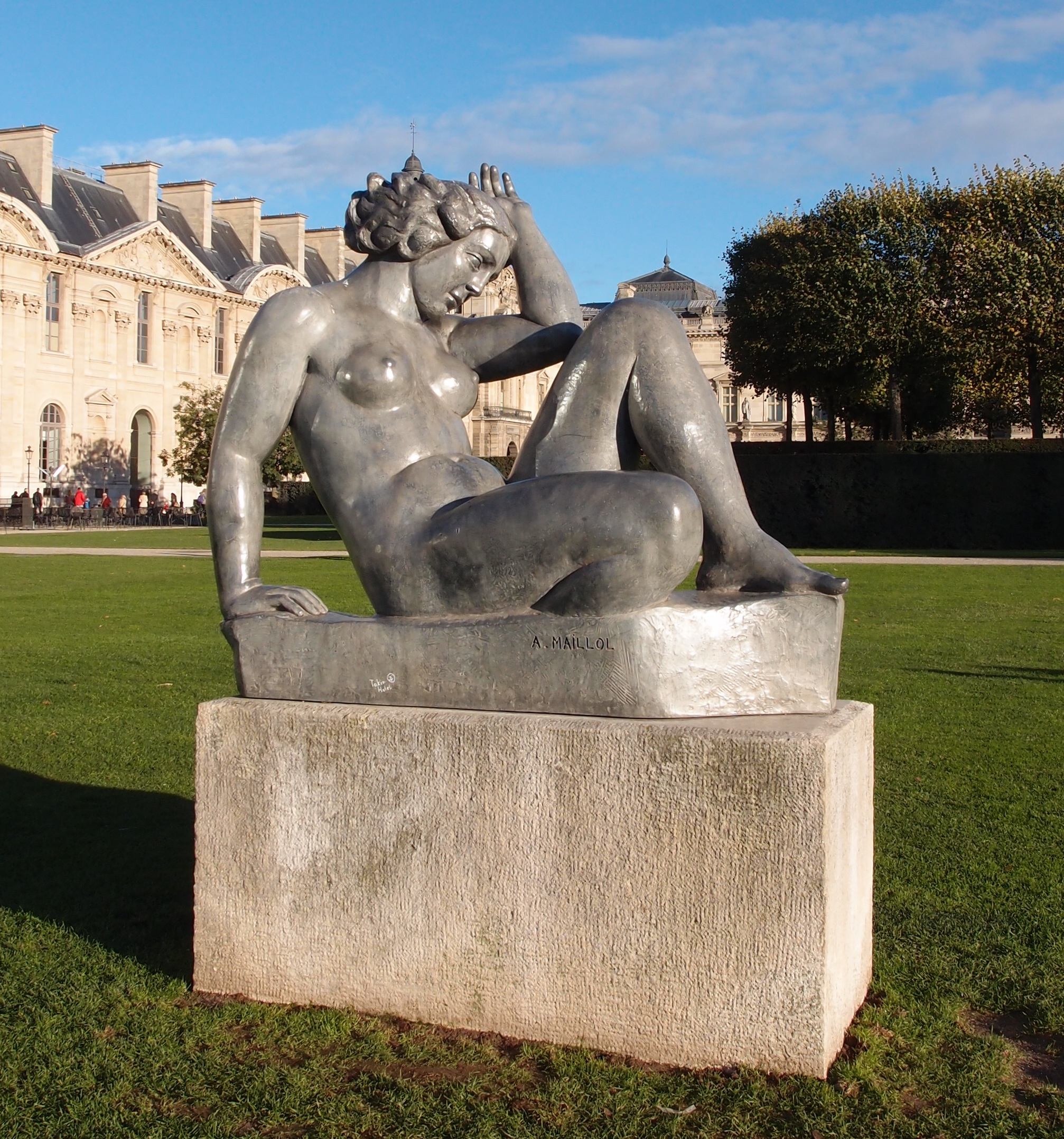
- La Montagne, Jardin des Tuileries, Paris
- Artist: Aristide Maillol
- Year: 1937

The Mountain (La Montagne) is a monumental sculpture by the French artist Aristide Maillol. Dina Vierny, the artist's longtime collaborator, served as a model for the sculpture.

The sculpture, carved in stone, was commissioned by the Musée National d'Art Moderne in 1936 and now can be found at the Museum of Fine Arts of Lyon. La Montagne was also cast in lead by the Rudier Foundry and the Emile Godard Foundry in an edition of six numbered casts, as four artist's proofs, and as two estate casts. In addition to gracing a number of private collections, casts of La Montagne can be viewed at these locations:

- Jardin des Tuileries, Paris
- Norton Simon Museum, Pasadena
- National Gallery of Australia, Canberra
- St. Louis Art Museum, Missouri
- Columbus Museum of Art, Ohio
- Musée Maillol, Paris
- Tel Aviv Museum of Art, Israel
- Kenyon College, Ohio
