= Eugène-René Arsal =

French sculptor

Eugène-René Arsal (3 August 1884 - 14 November 1972) was a French sculptor.

== Biography ==
Eugène-René Arsal was born on the 3rd of August 1884 in Paris. He was a student of Aristide Maillol and Hector Lemaire. He installed his workshop in Vincennes and presented his works in the Salon des artistes français from 1905 to 1939. Arsal was a member of the Société des artistes français, and he got an Honorable mention in 1923 at the Salon des artistes français.

He died on 14 November 1972 in Vincennes.
