= Musée Maillol Banyuls-sur-Mer =

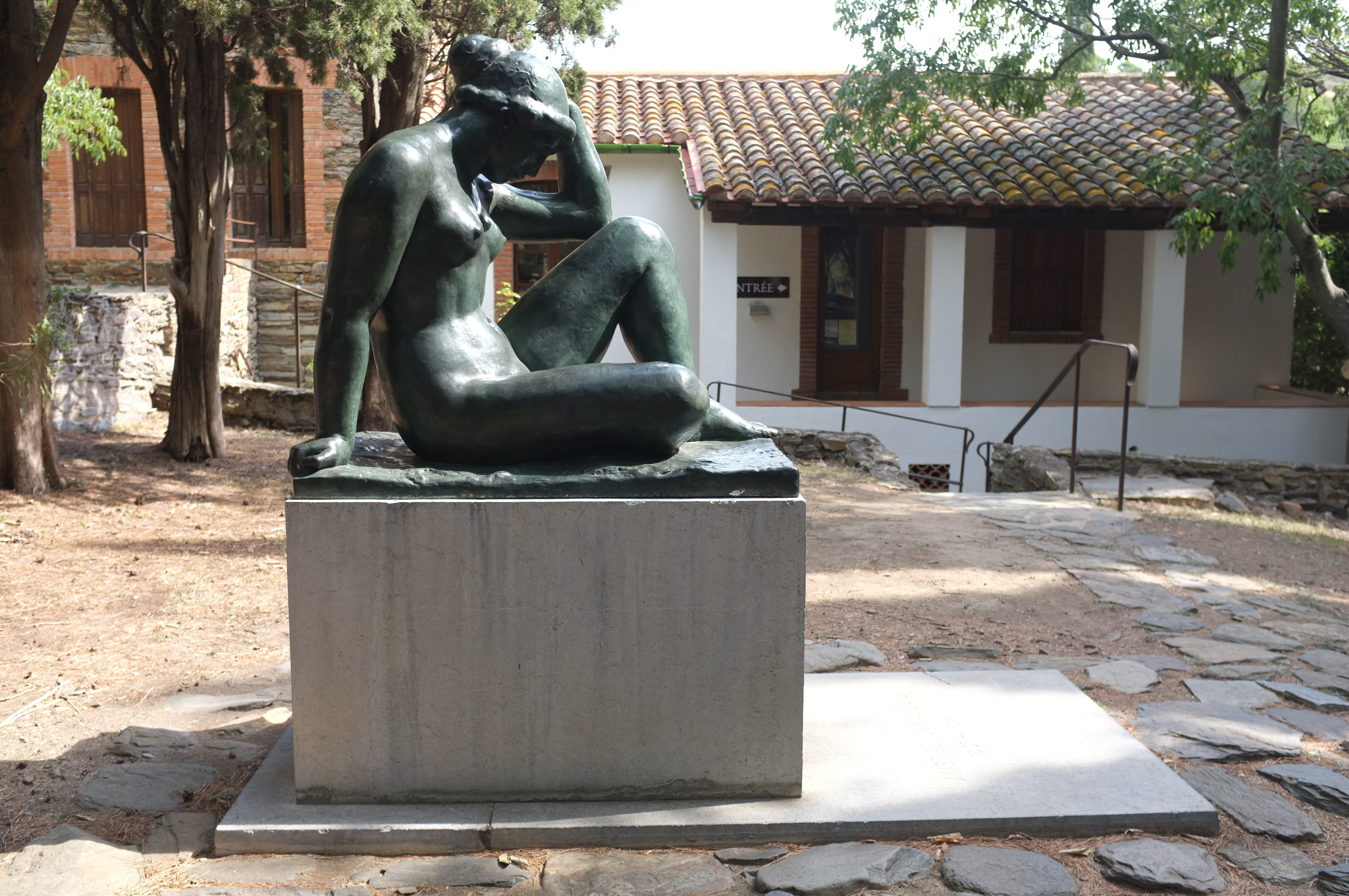
- Maillol's tomb in the museum's garden.
- Established: 1994
- Location: Banyuls-sur-Mer
- Coordinates: 42.461902°N 3.106739°E
- Collections: Paintings, sculptures, drawings

The Musée Maillol de Banyuls-sur-Mer is a private museum at the farm of the sculptor Aristide Maillol where he spent the last years of his life. The farm, "La Métairie", is situated in the Roume valley 4 km from the city center of Banyuls-sur-Mer in the Pyrénées-Orientales. The museum is operated by the Fondation Dina Vierny, which also operates the Musée Maillol in Paris.

== Establishment ==
After Maillol's death in 1944, the site was abandoned and deteriorated. Much later, thanks to the combined actions of Maillol's model and muse Dina Vierny and the city of Banyuls-sur-Mer, the rescue and restoration of the farm took place. A small Maillol museum was opened to the public at the end of 1994.

== Exhibits ==
The museum presents works of Aristide Maillol as well as artifacts from his daily life in La Métairie. Exhibits include:

- 36 bronze and terracotta sculptures
- Lithographs, drawings, paintings, and ceramics
- The dining-room of his studio at Marly-le-Roi and his kitchen
- His workshop
- Temporary exhibitions

In the garden of the museum is his tomb on which sits a bronze cast of La Méditerranée, one of his favorite works.

== Gallery ==
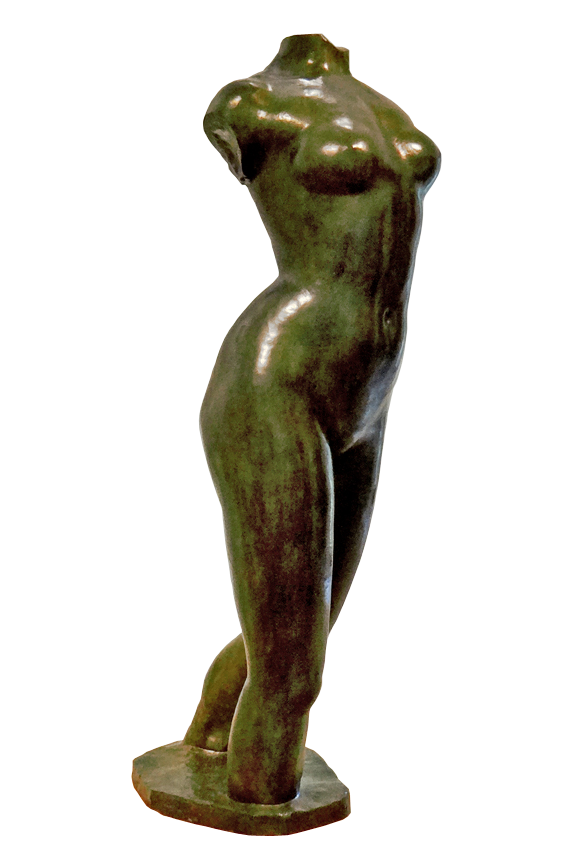
Torse de L'Ile de France (1921)

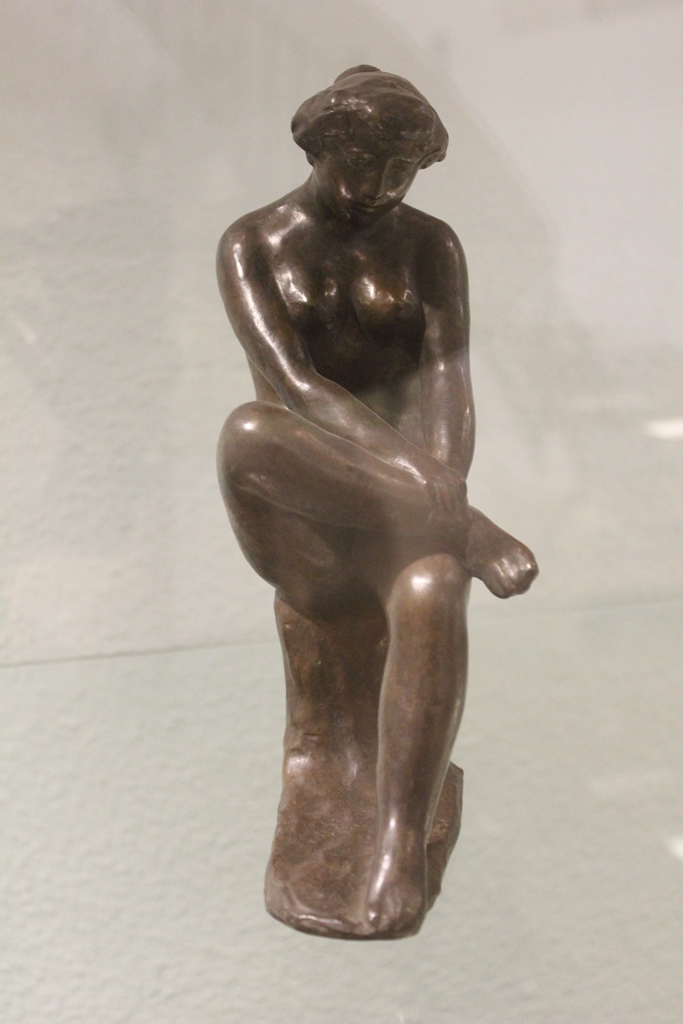
Statuette of a seated woman (1900)

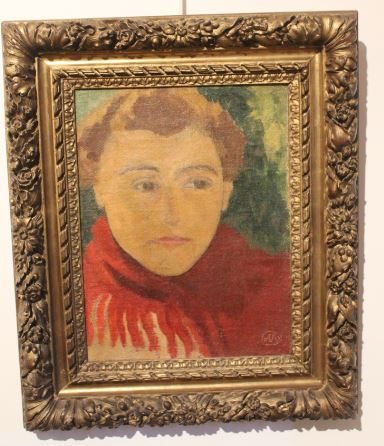
Figure painting with a red shawl (1930)

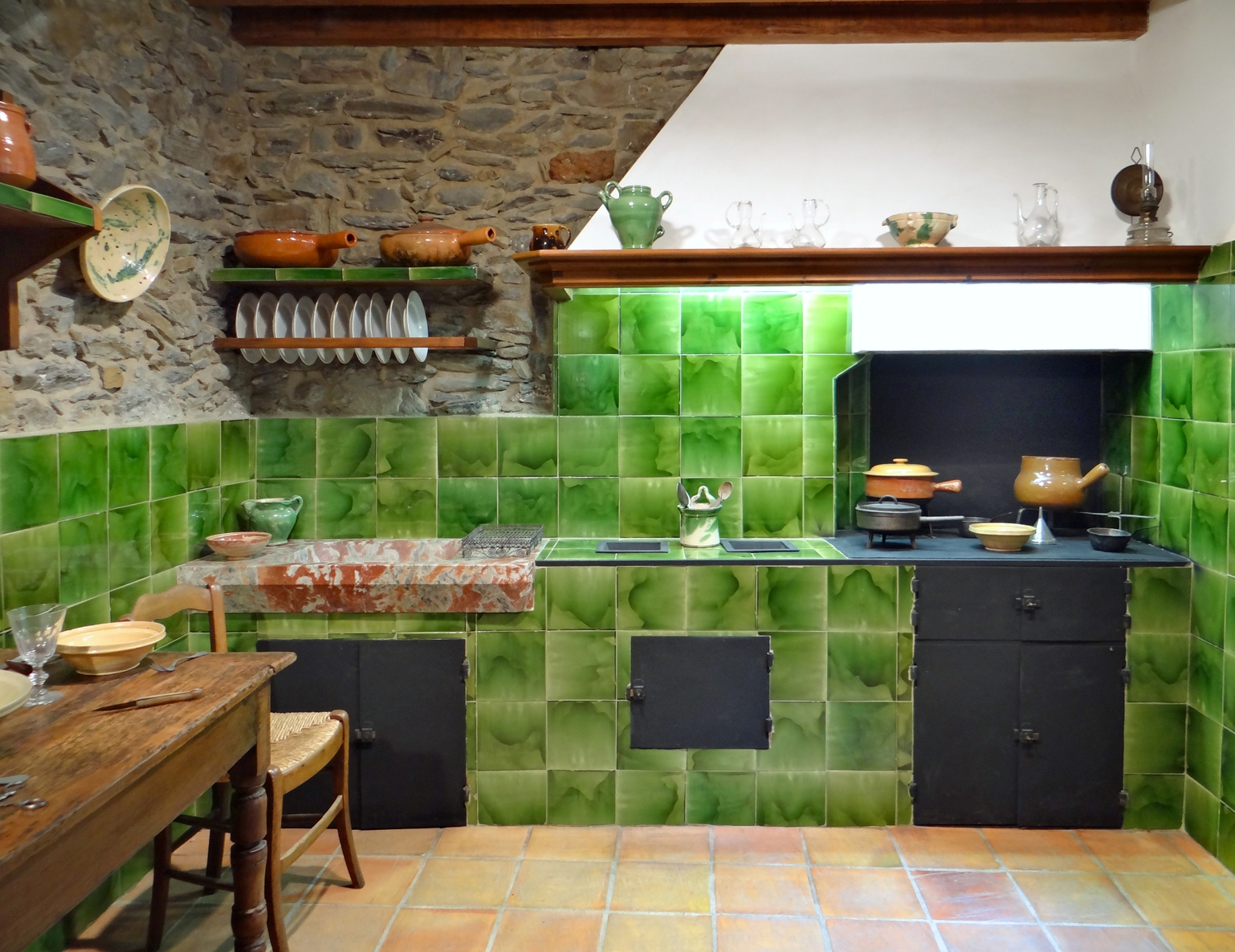
The kitchen

== See also ==
- List of single-artist museums
- Musée Maillol, Paris
