= Air (Maillol) =

Sculpture by Aristide Maillol

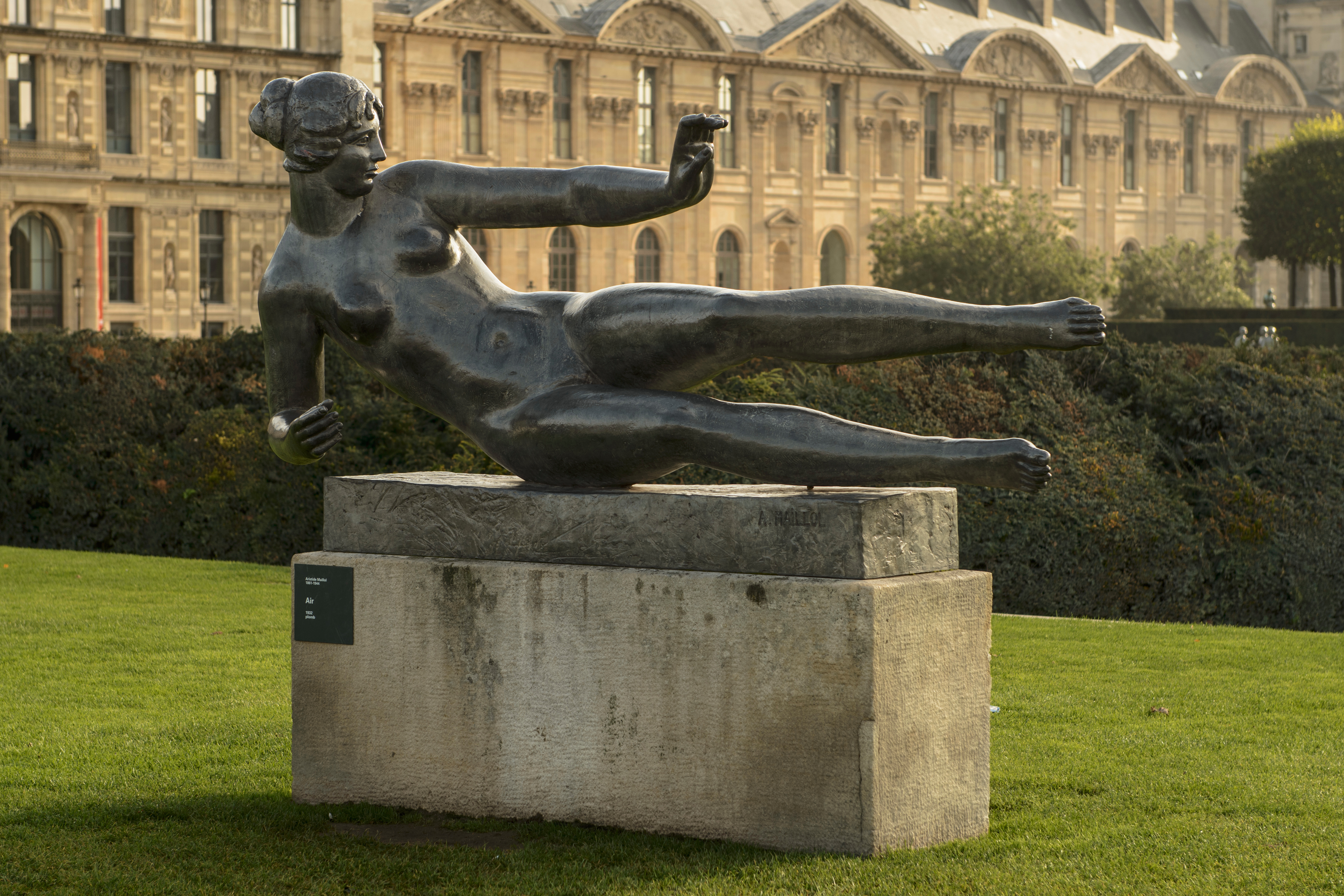
- Artist: Aristide Maillol
- Year: 1938
- Type: lead
- Dimensions: 130 cm × 240 cm × 93.3 cm (50 in × 94 in × 36 3/4 in)
- Location: various

Air is a lead or bronze sculpture, by Aristide Maillol.

He modeled Dina Vierny in plaster in 1938, and casts were made after his death. It is an edition of six. Examples are located at the Kröller-Müller Museum, Yale University Art Gallery, Jardin des Tuileries, J. Paul Getty Museum, Norton Simon Museum, and Kimbell Art Museum.
