= Vierny =

Vierny is a surname. Notable people with the surname include:

- Dina Vierny (1919–2009), French artists' model
- Sacha Vierny(1919–2001), French cinematographer
