= Bathing Woman with Raised Arms =

Sculpture by Aristide Maillol

- fr: La Baigneuse aux bras levés
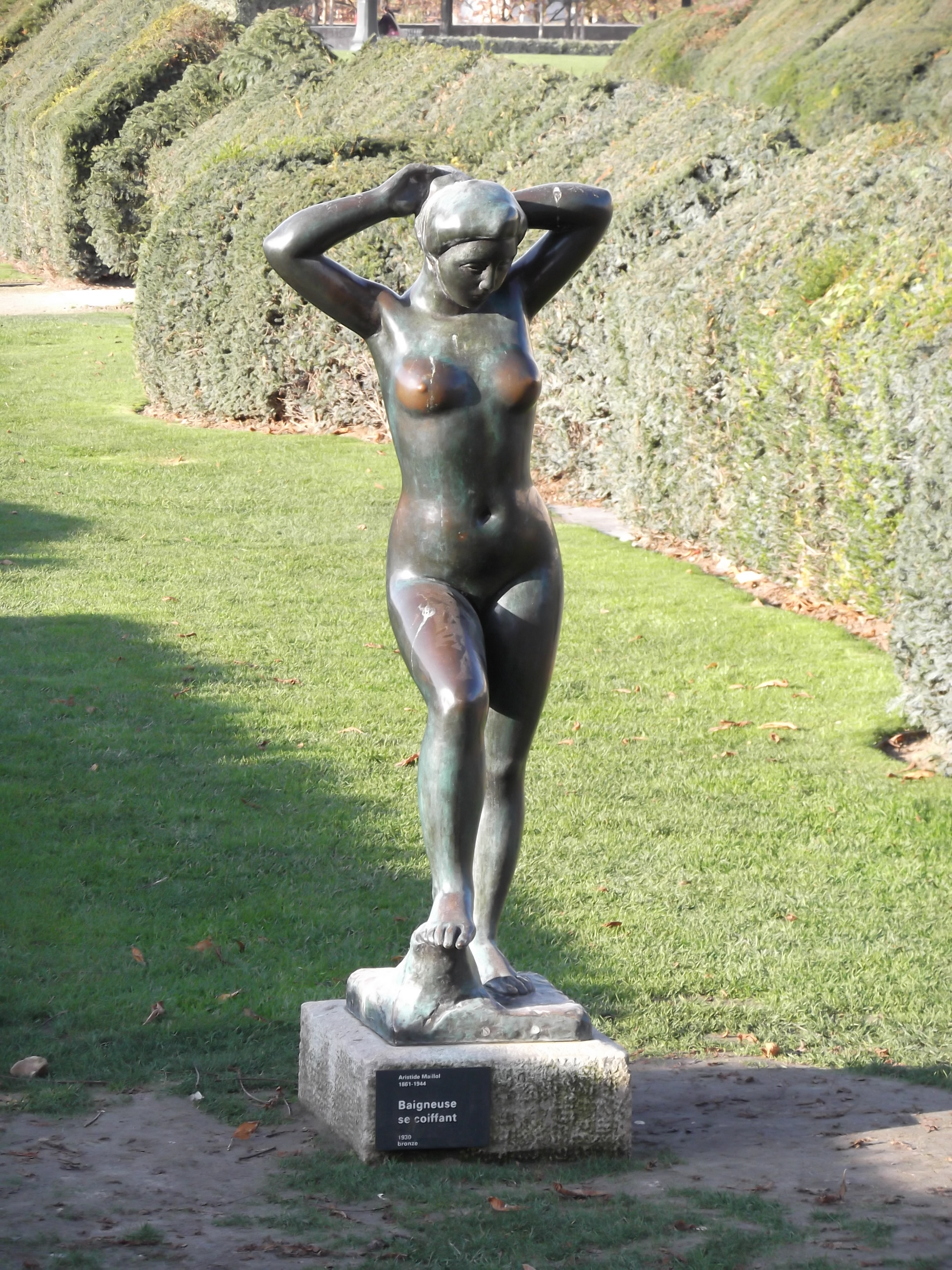
- Artist: Aristide Maillol
- Year: 1921
- Medium: Bronze
- Location: Tuileries Gardens

Bathing Woman with Raised Arms (French: La Baigneuse aux bras levés) is a 1921 bronze sculpture by the French artist Aristide Maillol. Since 1964 it has been exhibited in the Jardin du Carrousel next to the Tuileries Garden.
