= L'Été sans bras =

Sculpture by Aristide Maillol

L’Été sans bras
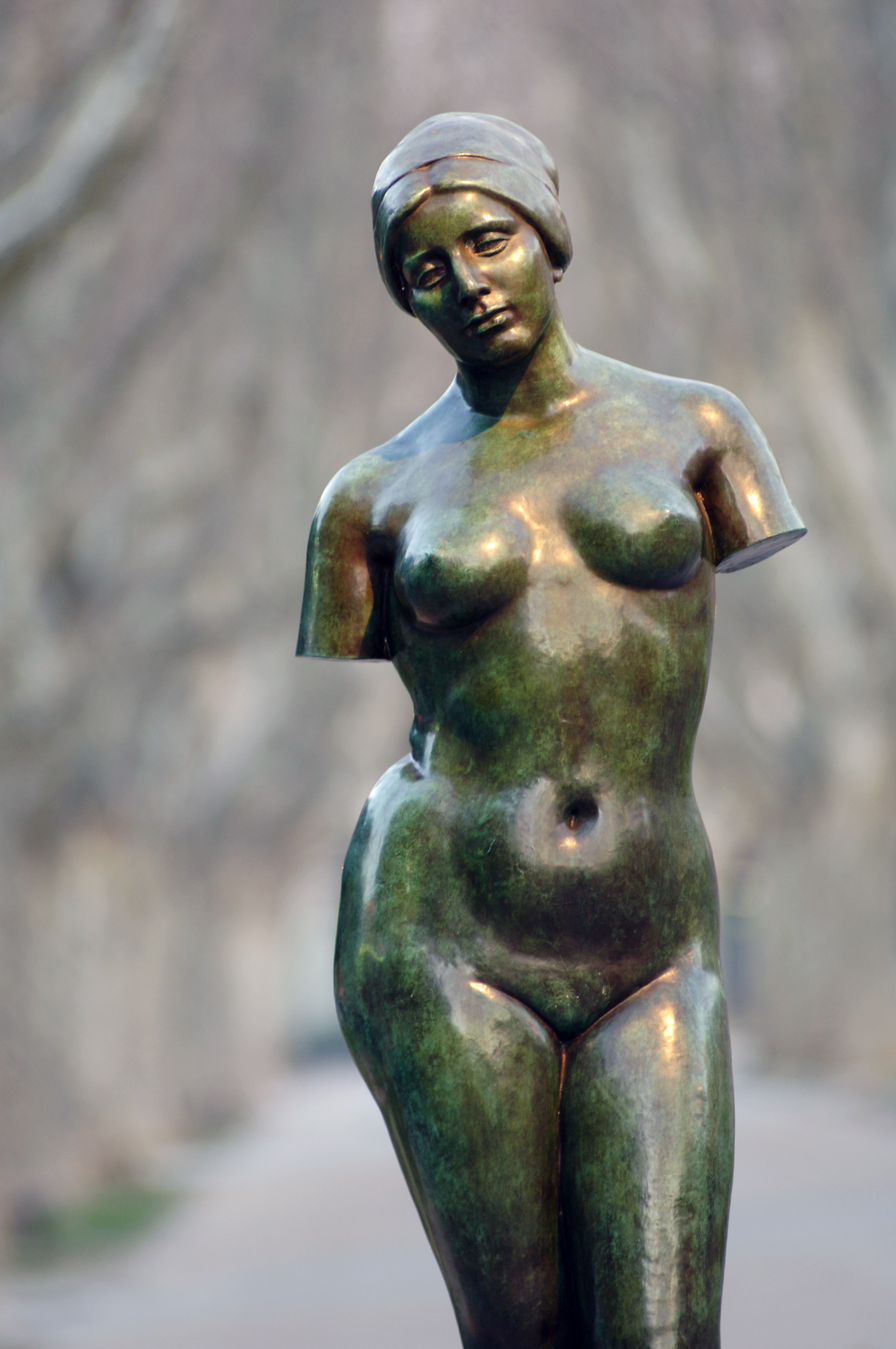
- Artist: Aristide Maillol
- Year: 1911
- Dimensions: 1.63 m (64 in)
- Location: Perpignan; 42.70235478°N 2.896356582°E
- Owner: City of Perpignan

L’Été sans bras is a sculpture made by Aristide Maillol in 1911.

== Design ==
L’Été sans bras ("without arms") is one of the versions of Maillol's L'Été. The project started as just a torso, and in successive versions a head, arms and legs were added.

The finished version (L'Été) was commission by the Russian Ivan Morozov at the beginning of the 20th century. It was one of Maillo's favourites; he said that "This piece of art is favored by Maillol who believes that 'arms hide profiles'." However, for several years the sculpture remained only as the uncompleted plasterwork L’Été sans bras in Maillol's studio.

== Public domain ==
Like the artist's other works, L'Été sans bras has been in the public domain in France since 1 January 2015.

== See also ==
- Venus de Milo
