= Nymph (Central Figure for "The Three Graces") =

Artwork by Aristide Maillol

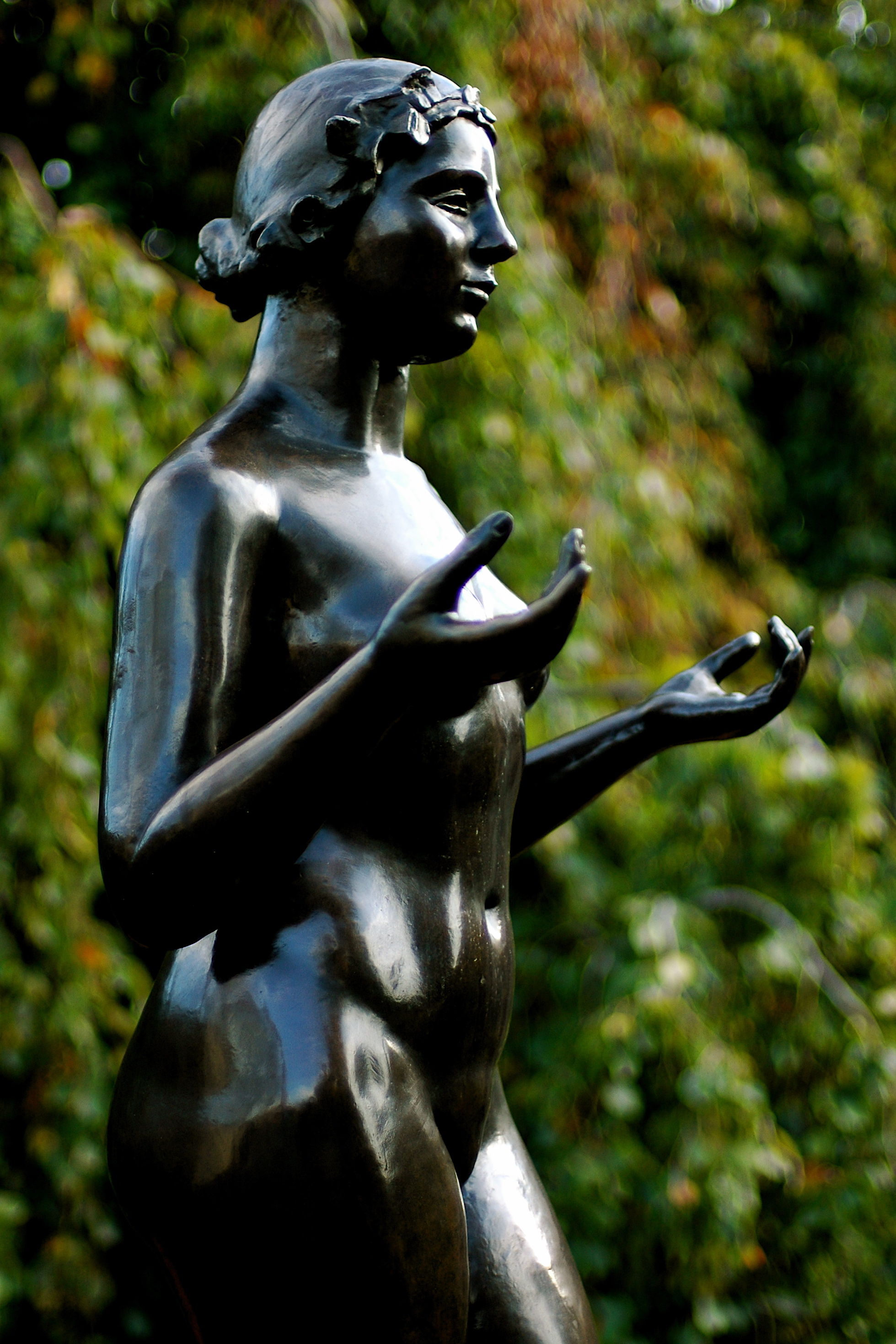
- Artist: Aristide Maillol
- Type: Bronze
- Dimensions: 154.6 cm × 62.2 cm × 47.6 cm (60 7/8 in × 24 1/2 in × 18 3/4 in)
- Location: Hirshhorn Museum and Sculpture Garden; Washington, D.C., United States
- Owner: Smithsonian Institution

Nymph (Central Figure for "The Three Graces") is a bronze sculpture, by Aristide Maillol. It was modeled in 1930, and cast in 1953, it is at the Hirshhorn Museum and Sculpture Garden.

In the tradition of the Three Graces in Ancient Roman sculpture, and The Three Graces, by Antonio Canova, it shows serenity, in contrast to his contemporary, Auguste Rodin.

In 1991, it was damaged by blast of a Harrier AV-8B landing as a part of the Gulf War National Victory Celebration.

== See also ==
- List of public art in Washington, D.C., Ward 2
