= La Rivière (Maillol) =

Sculpture by Aristide Maillol

Coordinates: 48°51′43″N 2°19′55″E

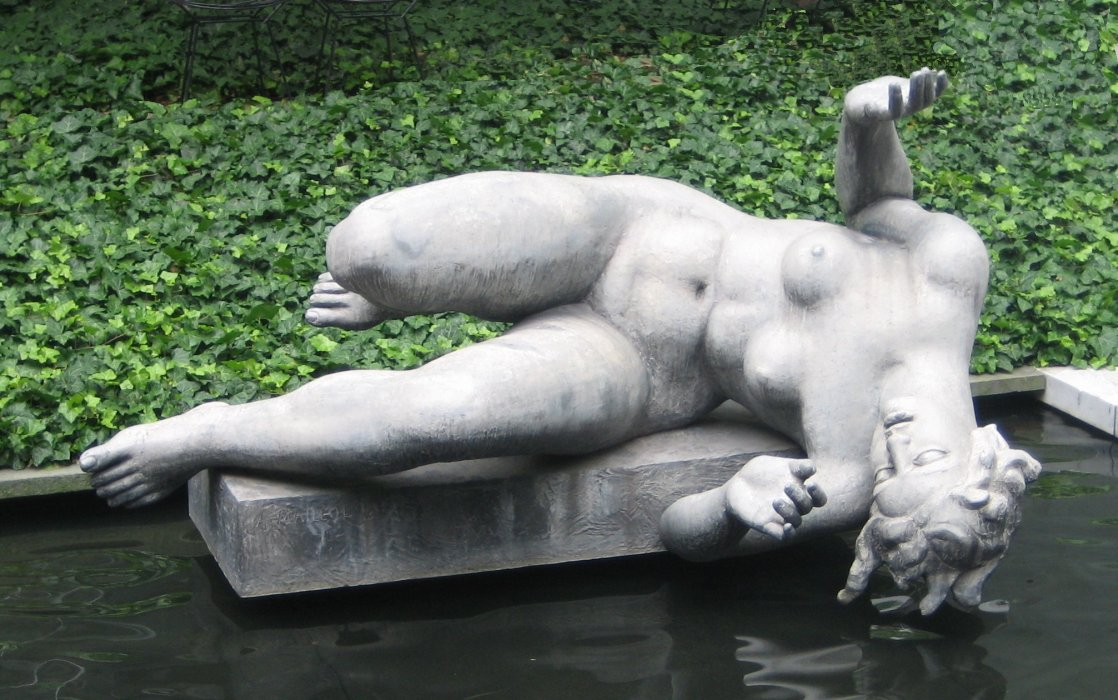
- Artist: Aristide Maillol
- Year: 1938-39; completed 1943
- Type: lead
- Dimensions: 136.5 cm × 230 cm × 170 cm (53 3/4 in × 90 in × 66 in)
- Location: various

La Rivière (The River) is a lead or bronze sculpture by Aristide Maillol.

== Location ==
There are examples at the Carrousel Garden in Paris; Citygarden in St. Louis, Missouri; the Museum of Modern Art in New York City; the Norton Simon Museum in Pasadena; Kunsthalle Hamburg, Hamburg; the Museum of Fine Arts, Houston; and the Virginia Museum of Fine Arts, Richmond, Virginia, among others held in private collections. A version is also located in the Talacker neighborhood of Zürich.

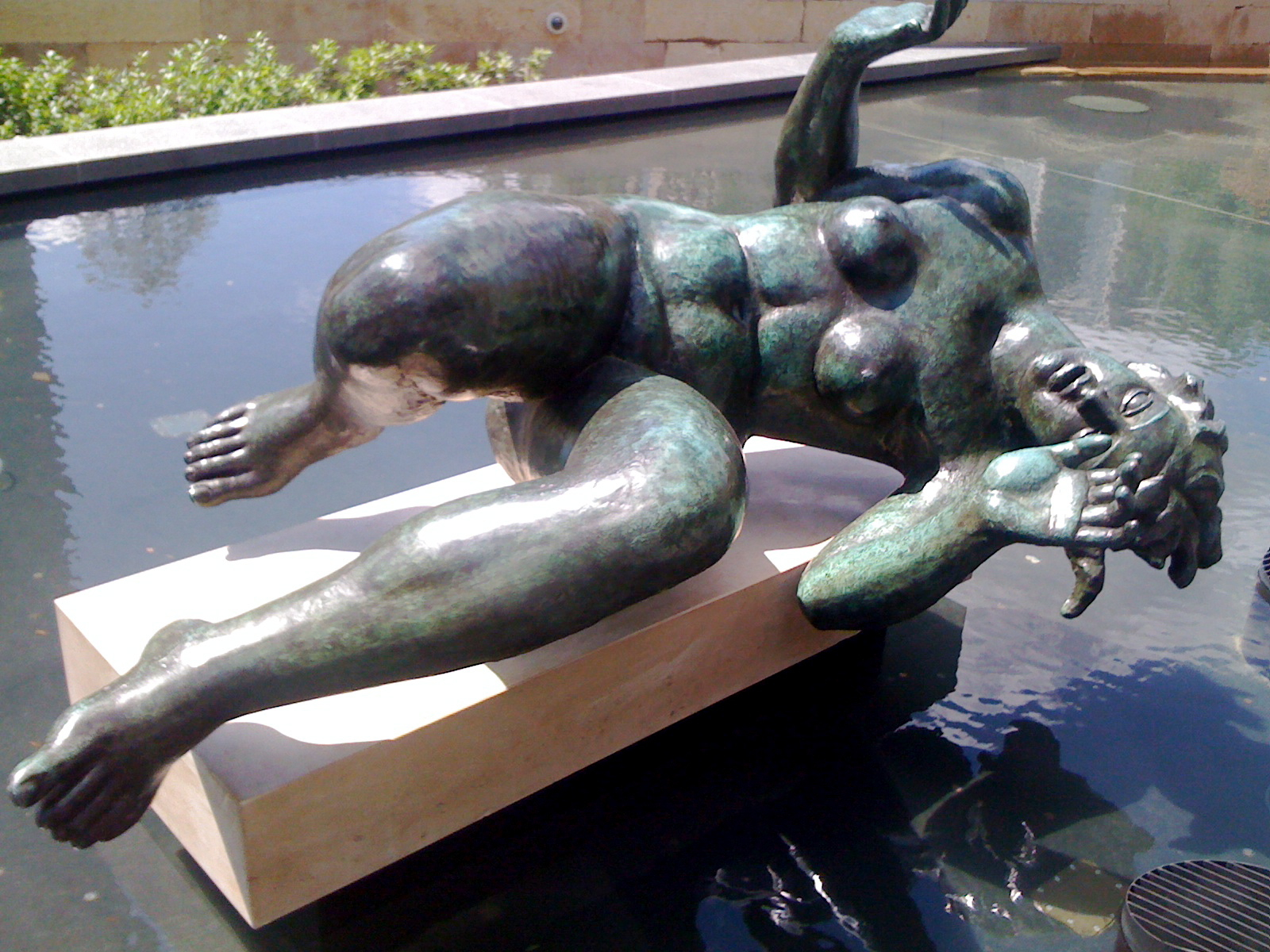
Bronze example
