= Aristide Maillol =

French artist (1861–1944)

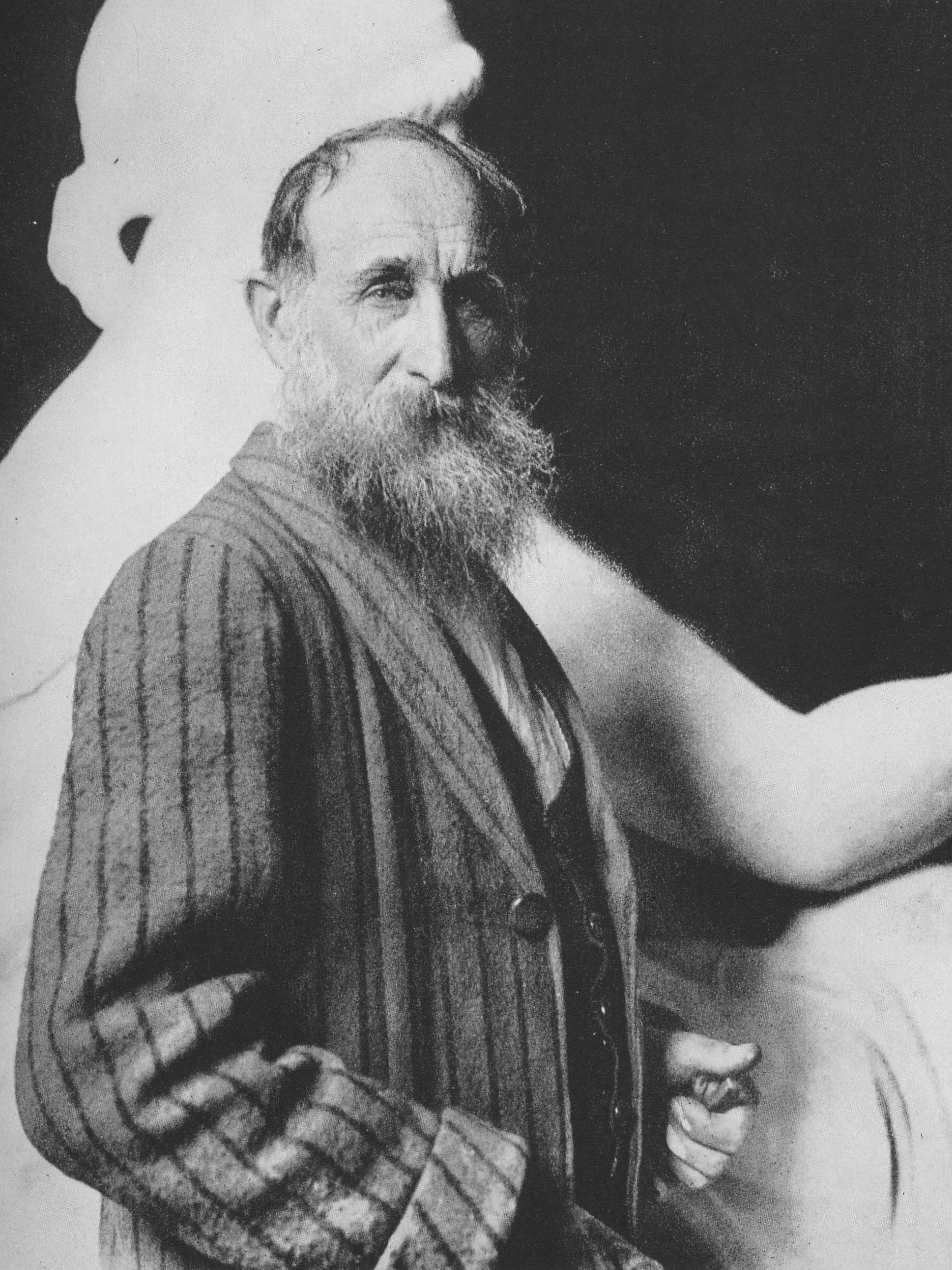
- Aristide Maillol (1925), in a photograph by Alfred Kuhn
- Born: Aristide Joseph Bonaventure Maillol; December 8, 1861; Banyuls-sur-Mer, Roussillon, France
- Died: September 27, 1944 (aged 82); Banyuls-sur-Mer, Roussillon, France
- Education: École des Beaux-Arts
- Known for: Sculpture, painting

Aristide Joseph Bonaventure Maillol (French: [mɑjɔl]; December 8, 1861 – September 27, 1944) was a French Catalan sculptor, painter, and printmaker.

He began his career as a painter and developed an early interest in the decorative arts. He became primarily interested in sculpture from his early 40s. Maillol was one of the most famous sculptors of his time. His work inspired artists such as Picasso, Henri Matisse and Henry Moore.

== Biography ==
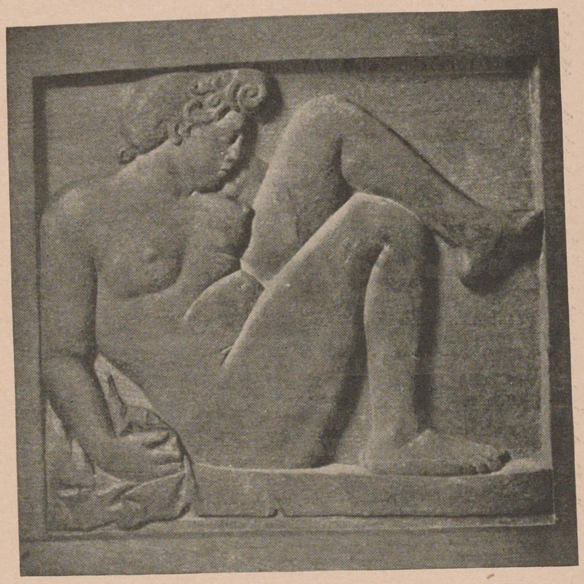
Maillol, Bas Relief, terracotta. Exhibited at the 1913 Armory Show, New York, Chicago, Boston. Catalogue image (no. 110)

Maillol was born in Banyuls-sur-Mer, Roussillon. He decided at an early age to become a painter, and moved to Paris in 1881 to study art. After several applications and several years of living in poverty, his enrollment in the École des Beaux-Arts was accepted in 1885, and he studied there under Jean-Léon Gérôme and Alexandre Cabanel. His early paintings show the influence of his contemporaries Pierre Puvis de Chavannes and Paul Gauguin.

Gauguin encouraged his growing interest in decorative art, an interest that led Maillol to take up tapestry design. In 1893 Maillol opened a tapestry workshop in Banyuls, producing works whose high technical and aesthetic quality gained him recognition for renewing this art form in France. He began making small terracotta sculptures in 1895, and within a few years his concentration on sculpture led to the abandonment of his work in tapestry.

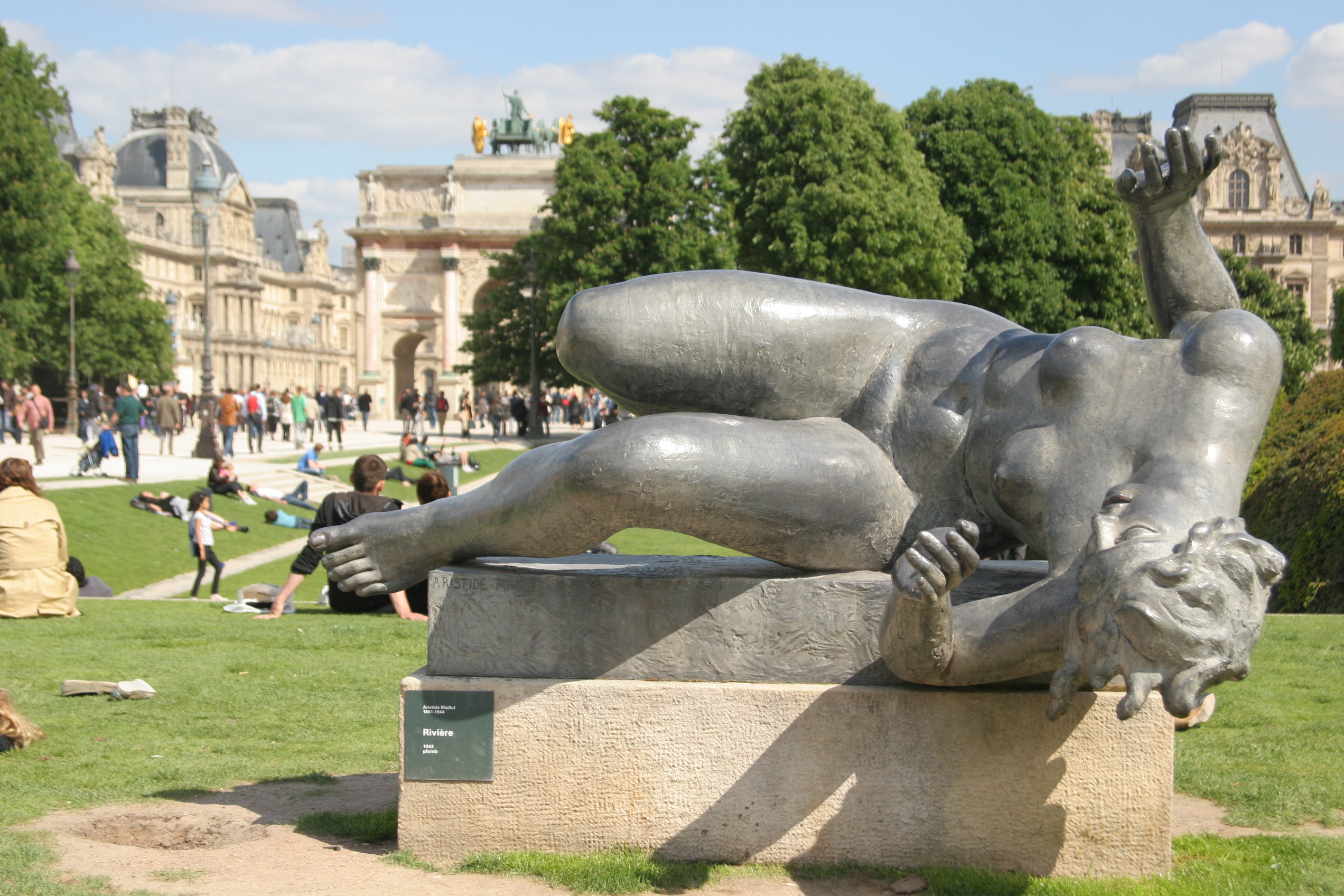
Maillol, The River, bronze, 1938–1943, at the Tuileries Garden in Paris

In July 1896, Maillol married Clotilde Narcis, one of his employees at his tapestry workshop. Their only son, Lucian, was born that October.

Maillol's first major sculpture, A Seated Woman, was modeled after his wife. The first version (in the Museum of Modern Art, New York) was completed in 1902, and renamed La Méditerranée. Maillol, believing that "art does not lie in the copying of nature", produced a second, less naturalistic version in 1905. In 1902, the art dealer Ambroise Vollard provided Maillol with his first exhibition.

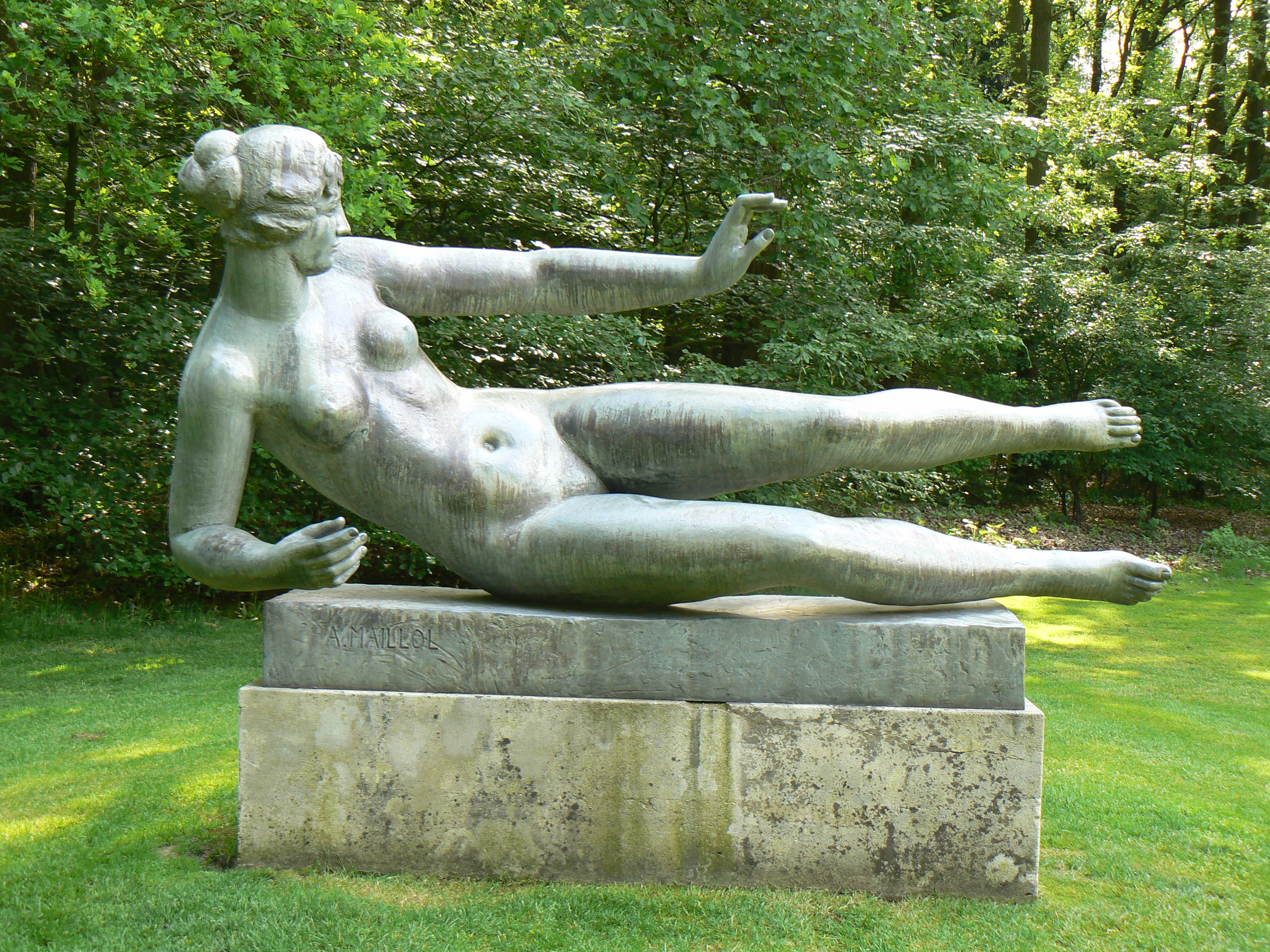
Air cast 1938, Kröller-Müller Museum

The subject of nearly all of Maillol's mature work is the female body, treated with a classical emphasis on stable forms. The figurative style of his large bronzes is perceived as an important precursor to the greater simplifications of Henry Moore, and his serene classicism set a standard for European (and American) figure sculpture until the end of World War II.

Josep Pla said of Maillol, "These archaic ideas, Greek, were the great novelty Maillol brought into the tendency of modern sculpture. What you need to love from the ancients is not the antiquity, it is the sense of permanent, renewed novelty, that is due to the nature and reason."

His important public commissions include a 1912 commission for a monument to Cézanne, as well as numerous war memorials commissioned after World War I.

Maillol served as a juror with Florence Meyer Blumenthal in awarding the Prix Blumenthal (1919–1954) a grant awarded to painters, sculptors, decorators, engravers, writers, and musicians.

Maillol was a prominent illustrator of classical literature: he produced series of illustrations for the poetic works of Virgil (Eclogues and Georgics), Ovid (Ars Amatoria), Horace and Longus, which were often printed alongside translations or bilingual editions of the respective texts. His series of woodcut illustrations for an edition of Vergil's Eclogues was published by Harry Graf Kessler in 1926–27. He also illustrated Chansons pour elle by Paul Verlaine (1939).

He died in Banyuls at the age of eighty-two, in an automobile accident. While driving home during a thunderstorm, the car in which he was a passenger skidded off the road and rolled over. A large collection of Maillol's work is maintained at the Musée Maillol in Paris, which was established by Dina Vierny, Maillol's model and platonic companion during the last 10 years of his life. His home a few kilometers outside Banyuls, also the site of his final resting place, has been turned into a museum, the Musée Maillol Banyuls-sur-Mer, where a number of his works and sketches are displayed.

Three of his bronzes grace the grand staircase of the Metropolitan Opera House in New York City: Summer (1910–11), Venus Without Arms (1920), and Kneeling Woman: Monument to Debussy (1950–55). The third, the artist's only reference to music, is a copy of an original created for the French city of Saint-Germain-en-Laye, Claude Debussy's birthplace.

== Nazi-looted art ==
During the German occupation of France, dozens of artworks by Maillol were seized by the Nazi looting organization known as the E.R.R. or Reichsleiter Rosenberg Taskforce. The Database of Art Objects at the Jeu de Paume lists thirty artworks by Maillol. The German Lost Art Foundation database lists 33 entries for Maillol. The German Historical Museum's database for artworks recovered by the Allies at the Munich Central Collecting Point has 13 items related to Maillol. Maillol's sculpture "Head of Flora" was found in the stash of Cornelius Gurlitt, son of Hitler's art dealer Hildebrand Gurlitt together with lithographs, drawings and paintings.

A photograph from May 24, 1946, shows "Six men, members of the Monuments, Fine Arts & Archives section of the military, prepare Aristide Maillol's sculpture Baigneuse à la draperie, looted during World War II for transport to France. Sculpture is labeled with sign: Wiesbaden, no. 31."

Jewish art collectors whose artworks by Maillol were looted by Nazis include Hugo Simon, Alfred Flechtheim and many others.

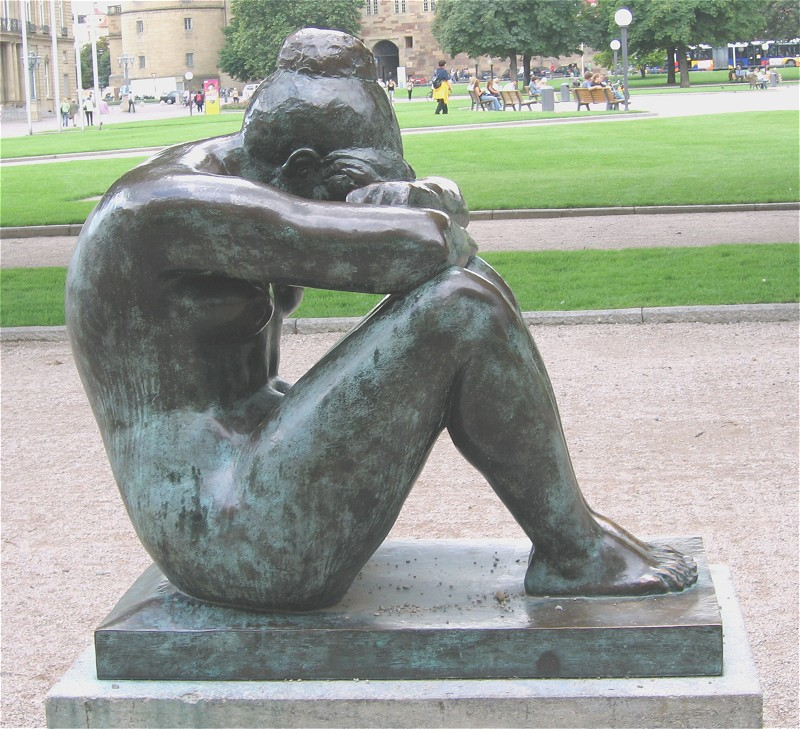
Aristide Maillol, The Night, (1902), Stuttgart

== Works ==
- Mme Henry Clemens van de Velde (c. 1899)
- The Mediterranean (1902–05)
- Action in Chains (1905)
- Flora, Nude (1910)
- L'Été sans bras (1911)
- Bathing Woman with Raised Arms (1921)
- Nymph (1930)
- The Mountain (1937)
- L'Air (1938)
- The River (1938–43)
- Harmonie (1944)
- Femme à l’Écharpe (circa 1919–20, cast in bronze in edition of 6; certificate of authenticity from model Dina Vierny dated 29.10.1970)

== Sources ==
- Solomon R. Guggenheim Museum, "Aristide Maillol, 1861–1944", New York, Solomon R. Guggenheim Foundation, 1975.
- Frèches-Thory, Claire, & Perucchi-Petry, Ursula, ed.: Die Nabis: Propheten der Moderne, Kunsthaus Zürich & Grand Palais, Paris & Prestel, Munich 1993 ISBN 3-7913-1969-8 (German), (French)
