= Banyuls-sur-Mer =

Banyuls-sur-Mer Banyuls de la Marenda (Catalan) Banhòls de Mar (Occitan)
- Commune
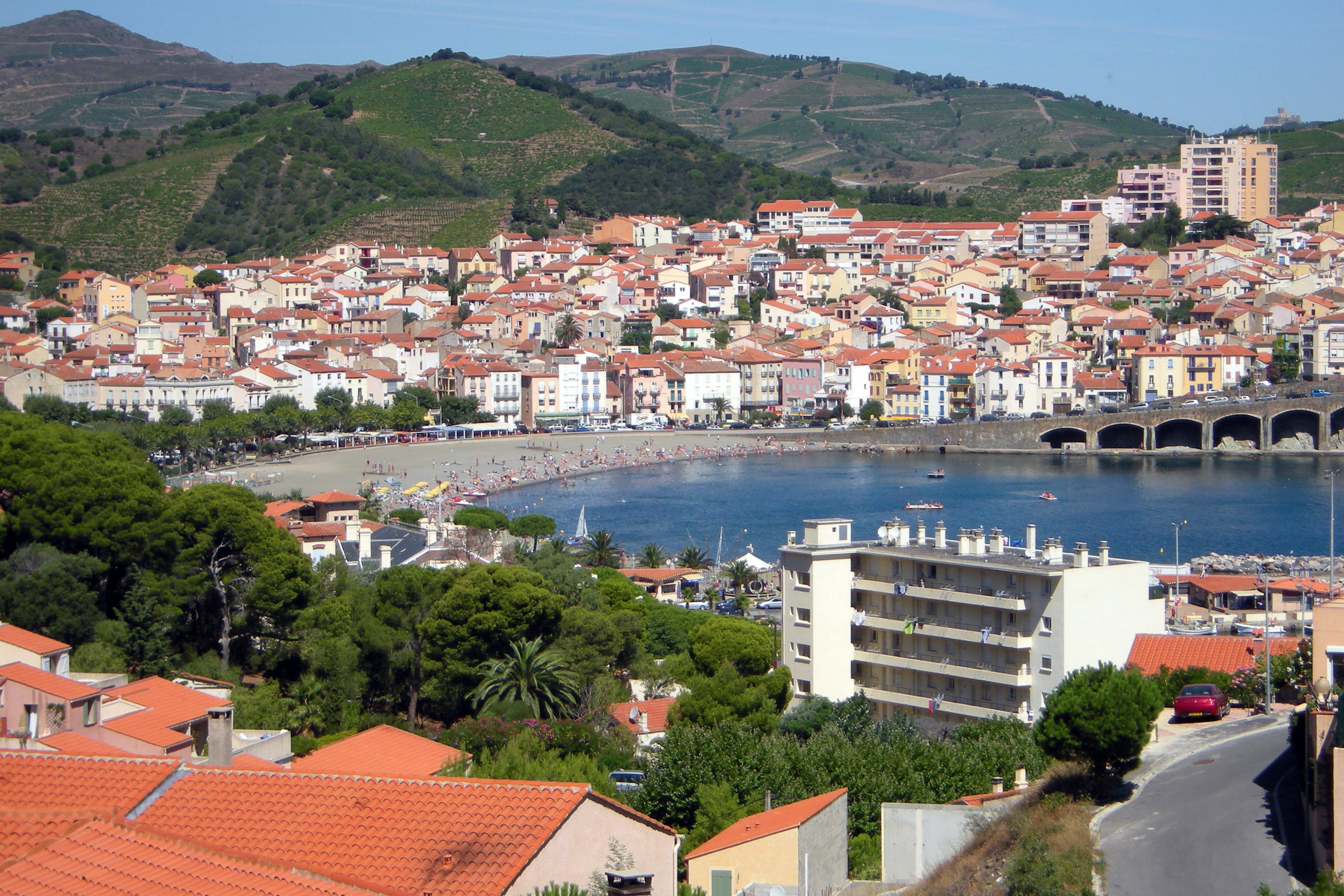
- A general view of Banyuls-sur-Mer

- Coat of arms
- Location of Banyuls-sur-Mer
- Location within France Location within Occitanie
- Coordinates: 42°28′59″N 3°07′41″E
- Country: France
- Region: Occitania
- Department: Pyrénées-Orientales
- Arrondissement: Céret
- Canton: La Côte Vermeille
- Intercommunality: CC des Albères, de la Côte Vermeille et de l'Illibéris

Government
  - Mayor (2020–2026): Jean-Michel Solé
- Area^{1}: 42.34 km^{2} (16.35 sq mi)
- Elevation: 6 m (20 ft)
- Highest elevation: 965 m (3,166 ft)
- Lowest elevation: 0 m (0 ft)
- Population (2023): 4,496
  - Density: 106.2/km^{2} (275.0/sq mi)
- Demonym(s): banyulenc (-a) (ca) banholenc (-a) (oc)
- Time zone: UTC+01:00 (CET)
  - Summer (DST): UTC+02:00 (CEST)
- INSEE/Postal code: 66016 /66650
- ^{1} French Land Register data, which excludes lakes, ponds, glaciers > 1 km^{2} (0.386 sq mi or 247 acres) and river estuaries.

Banyuls-sur-Mer (French pronunciation: [baɲuls syʁ mɛʁ]; Catalan: Banyuls de la Marenda [bəˈɲuls də lə məˈɾendə]; Occitan: Banhòls de Mar or Banhòls de la Marenda), often just called Banyuls, is a commune in the French department of the Pyrénées-Orientales, Occitania southern France.

== Geography ==
=== Location ===
Banyuls-sur-Mer is located in the canton of La Côte Vermeille and in the arrondissement of Céret. It is part of the Northern Catalan comarca of Rosselló, within the subcomarca of Albera.

Banyuls-sur-Mer is neighbored by Cerbère, Port-Vendres, Argelès-sur-Mer and Collioure on its French borders, and by Espolla, Rabós, Colera and Portbou on its Spanish borders. The foothills of Pyrenees, the Monts Albères, run into the Mediterranean Sea in Banyuls-sur-Mer, creating a steep cliff line.

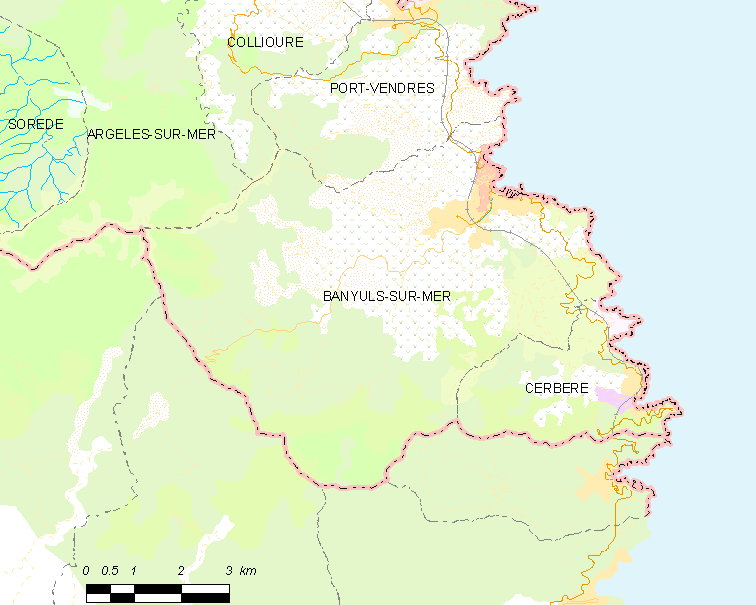
Map of Banyuls-sur-Mer and its surrounding communes

== Toponymy ==
Banyuls-sur-Mer was first mentioned in 981 as Balneum or Balneola. In 1074, the town started being called Bannils de Maritimo in order to distinguish it from Banyuls-dels-Aspres, which lies 20 km (12 mi) away. In 1197, the town was mentioned as Banullis de Maredine and in 1674. In Catalan, it has been called Banyuls de la Marenda since the 19th century.

The name Banyuls indicates the presence of a pond. In fact, a pond did exist in Banyuls-sur-Mer until the creek Vallauria was drained in 1872. The term Marenda in Catalan or sur Mer in French merely indicates the proximity to the coast.

== History ==
In the 20th century Banyuls-sur-Mer was the site of a camp housing Republican escapees from Spain at the end of the Spanish Civil War.

== Government and politics ==
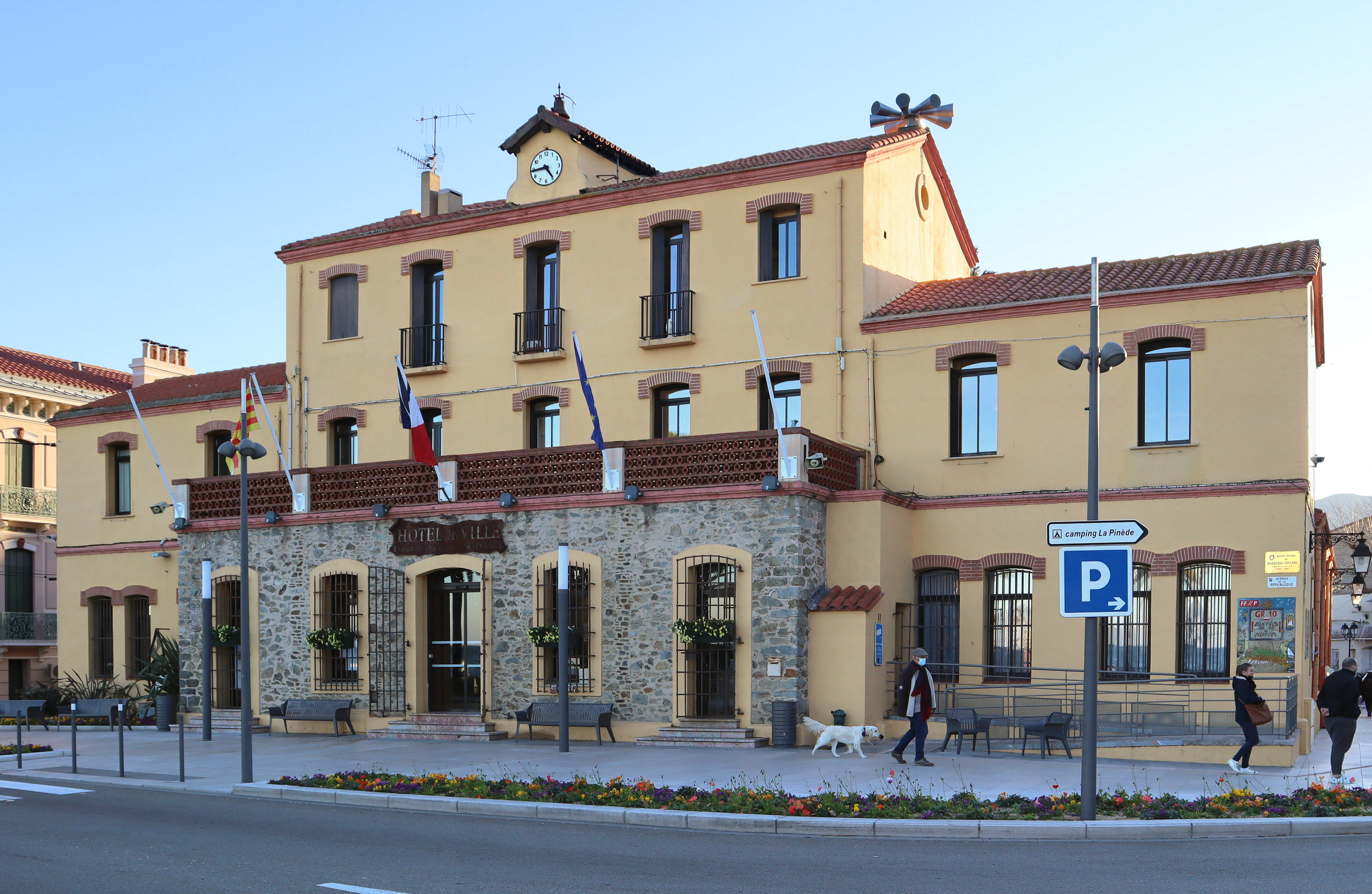
Town hall

=== Mayors ===
Mayor	Term start	Term end
René Ribère	1977	1983
Jean Rède	1983	1995
Pierre Becque	1995	2001
Roger Rulls	2001	2008
Jean Rède	2008	2014
Jean-Michel Solé	2014	

=== International relations ===
Banyuls-sur-Mer is twinned with Settle, North Yorkshire, United Kingdom and also with the town of Kralupy nad Vltavou in the Central Bohemian Region of the Czech Republic.

== Demography ==
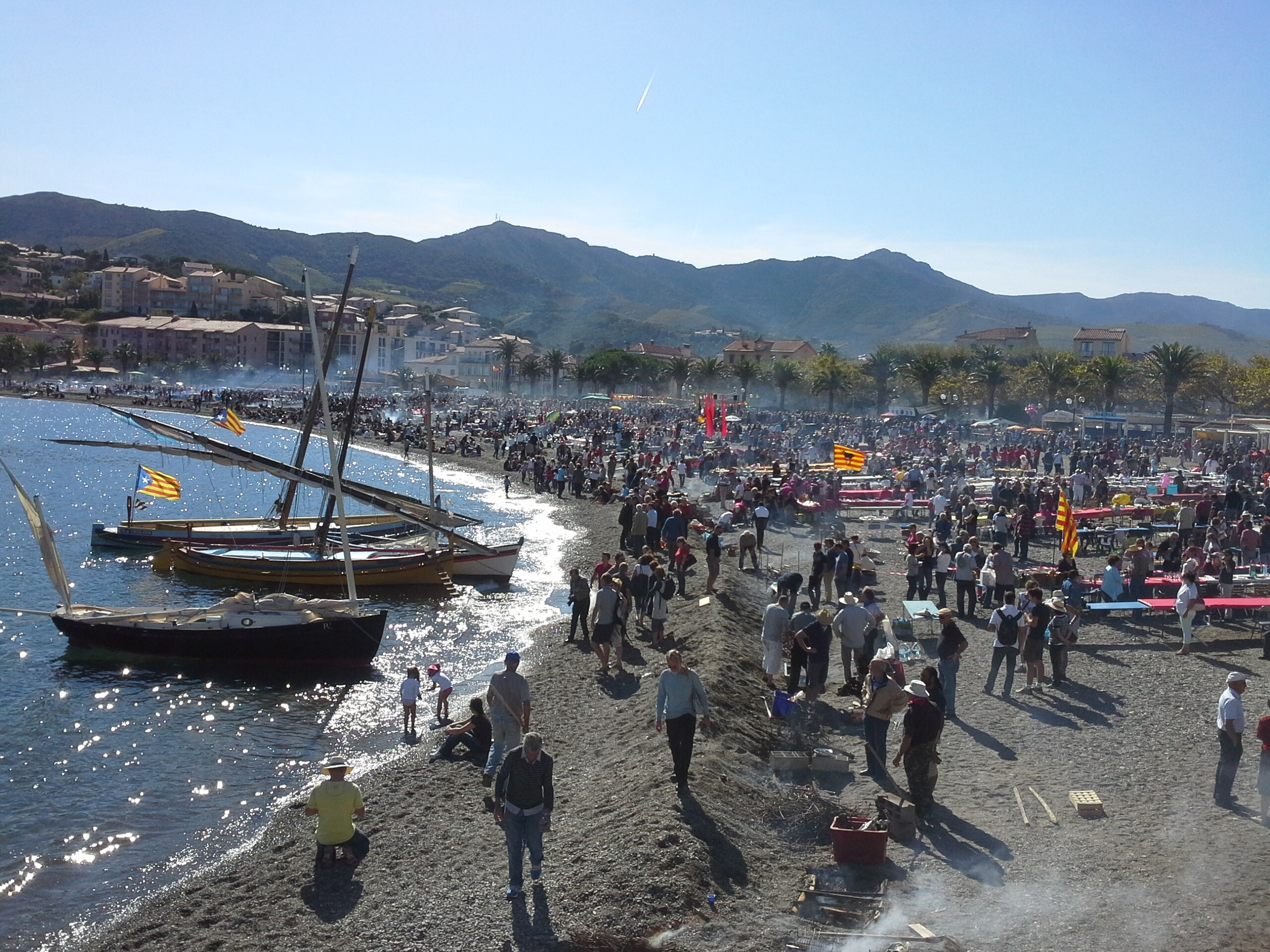
"Fête des Vendanges", wine festival held on the beach each year in October

Historical population

Year	Pop.	±% p.a.
1836	2,022	—
1901	3,111	+0.67%
1962	4,271	+0.52%
1968	4,436	+0.63%
1975	4,000	−1.47%
1982	4,093	+0.33%

Year	Pop.	±% p.a.
1990	4,662	+1.64%
1999	4,532	−0.31%
2007	4,644	+0.31%
2012	4,652	+0.03%
2017	4,761	+0.46%
2023	4,496	−0.95%

Source: EHESS and INSEE (1968–2023)

== Sports ==
- Banyuls-sur-Mer is at the eastern end of the GR 10 long-distance footpath.
- Banyuls is a centre for scuba diving. The main dive site of the area is the marine reserve at Cap Rederis. Local dive schools offer excellent facilities.
- Sea kayaking is also available here.

== Economy ==
For nearly two centuries, the smuggling of goods to and from Spain was a major activity in Banyuls-sur-Mer. Depending on the needs of the time, salt, tobacco, silver, sugar, rice, textiles, and leather were smuggled through this city, almost always with impunity. Otherwise the inhabitants lived mainly from fishing and viticulture. Nowadays, tourism stemming from the wine industry plays a significant economic role in the town, notably for delicious and rare red dessert wines. Under the Collioure appellation, the town is also a centre of quality dry reds, rosés and whites, with a number of producers of naturally sweet wines.

== Sites of interest ==
- Musée Maillol Banyuls-sur-Mer, a private museum at the farm of the sculptor Aristide Maillol where he is buried.

=== Sculptures by Aristide Maillol in Banyuls-sur-Mer ===
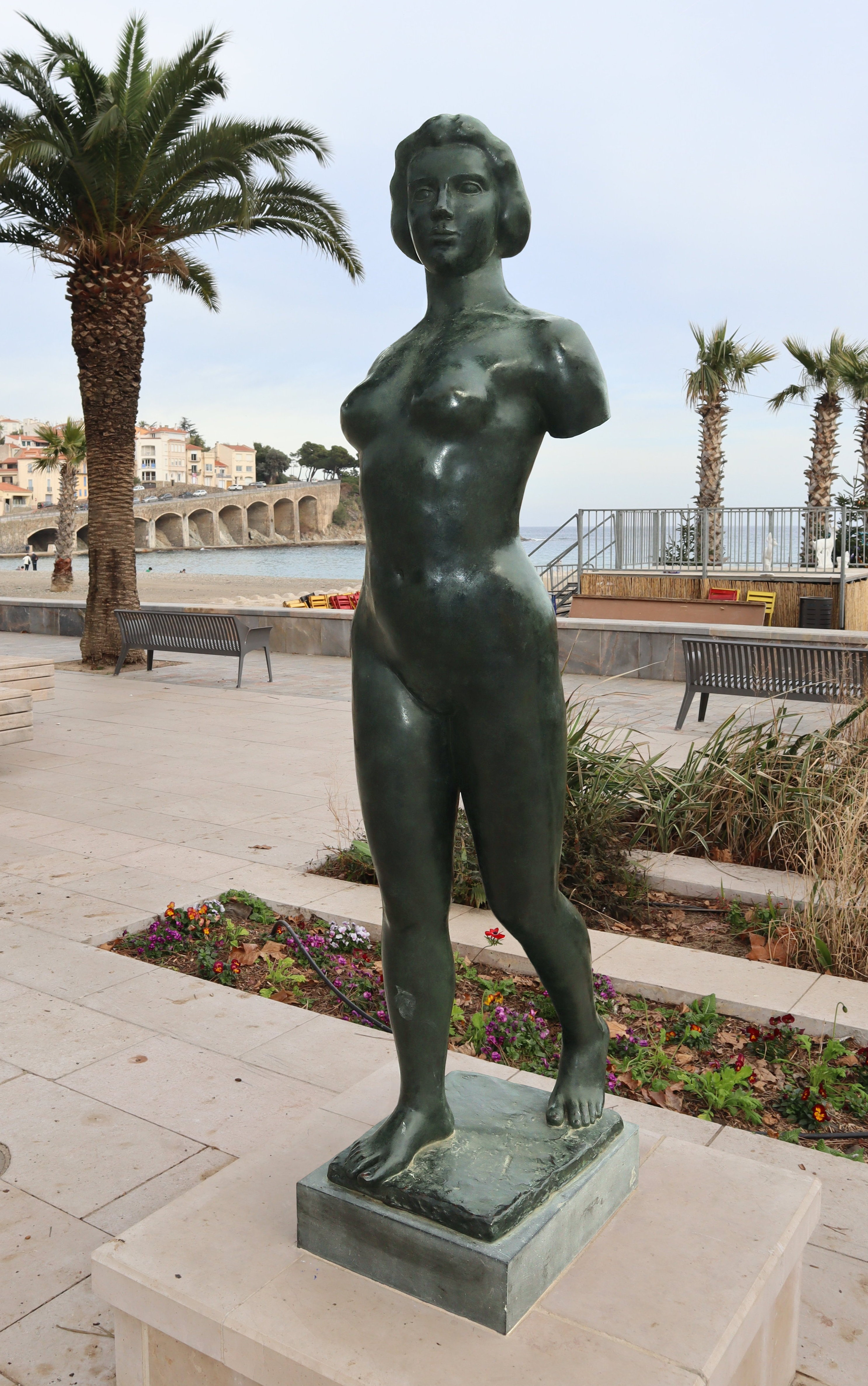
Île-de-France sans bras

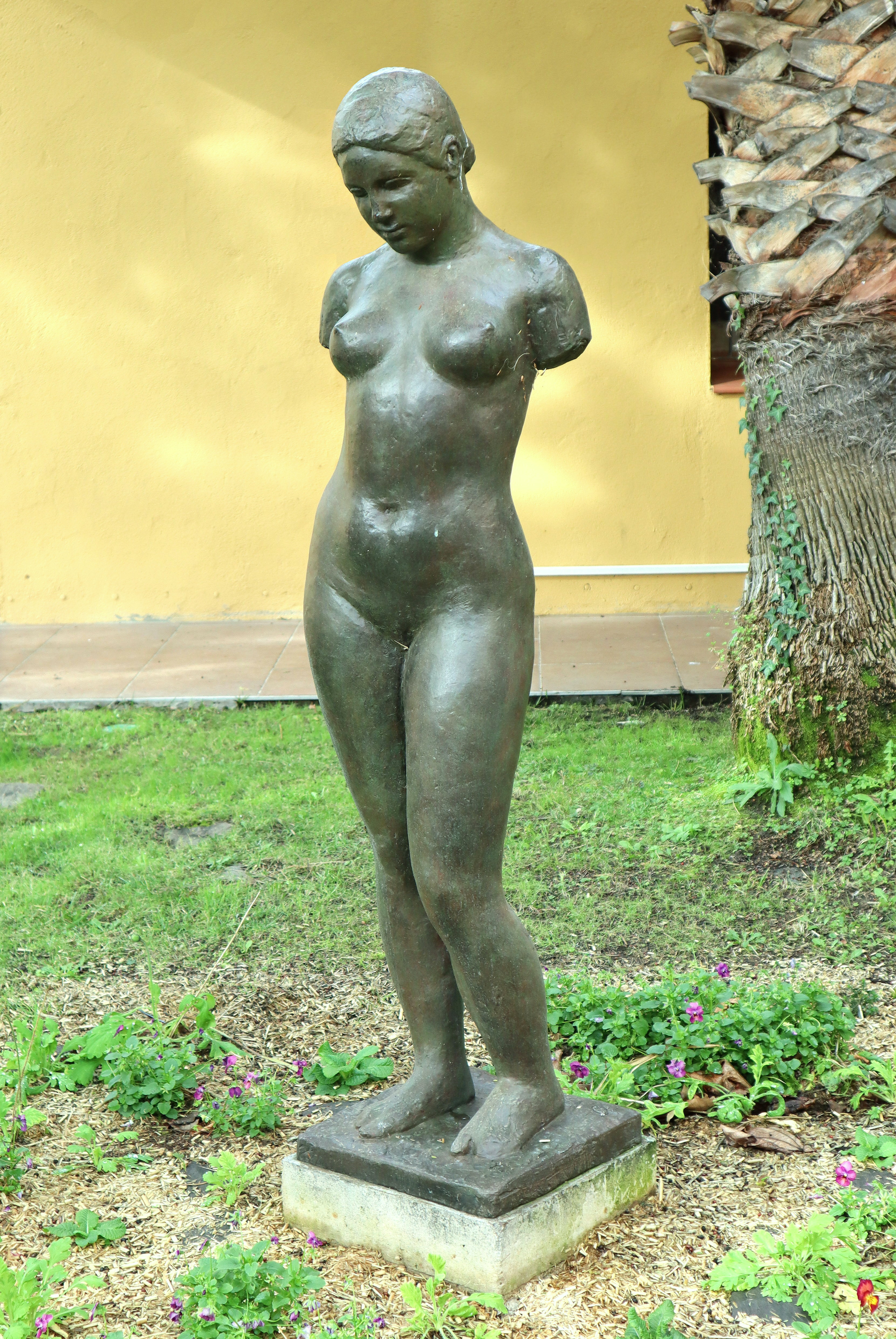
Dina esquisse pour l‘harmonie

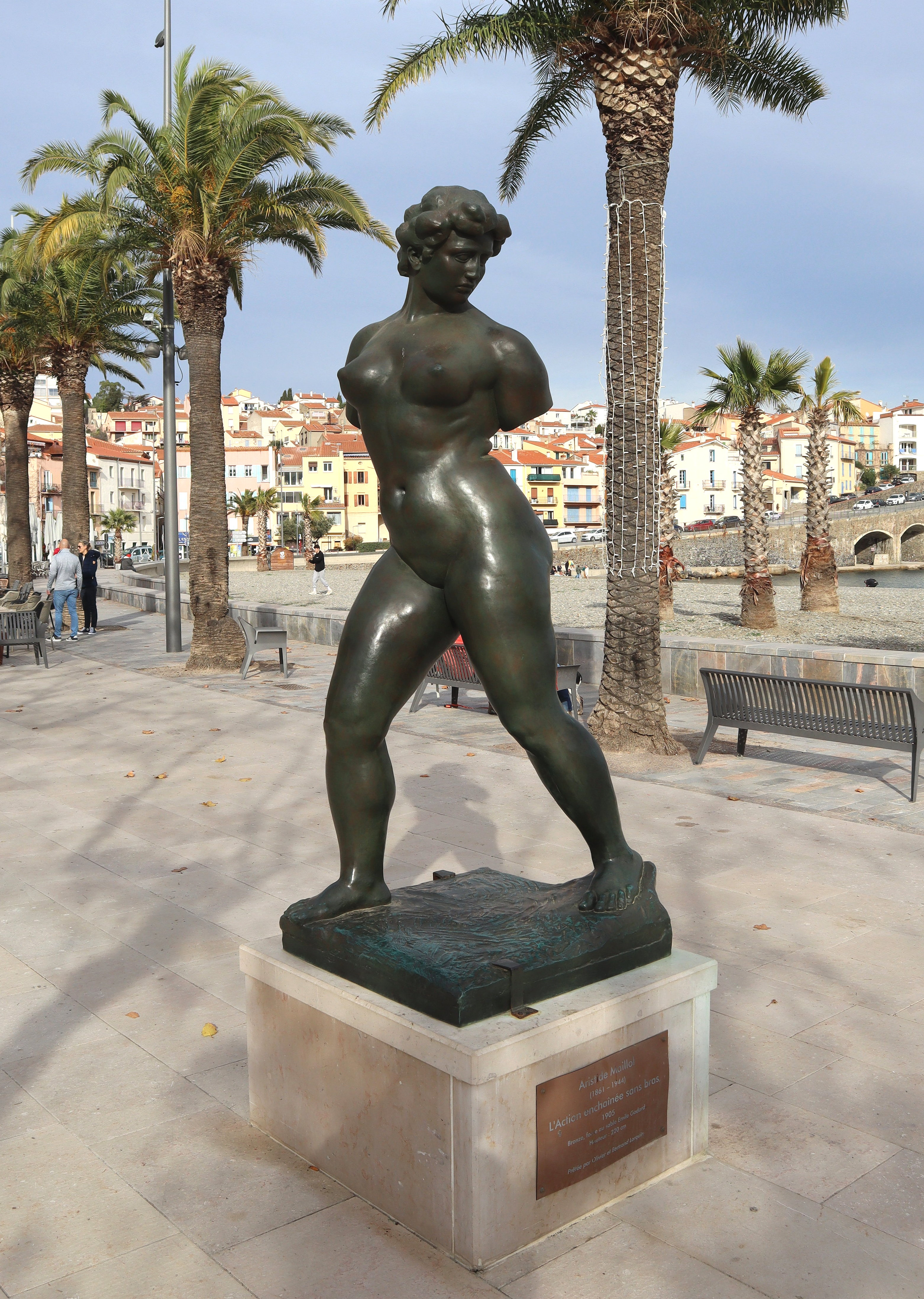
L’Action enchaînée

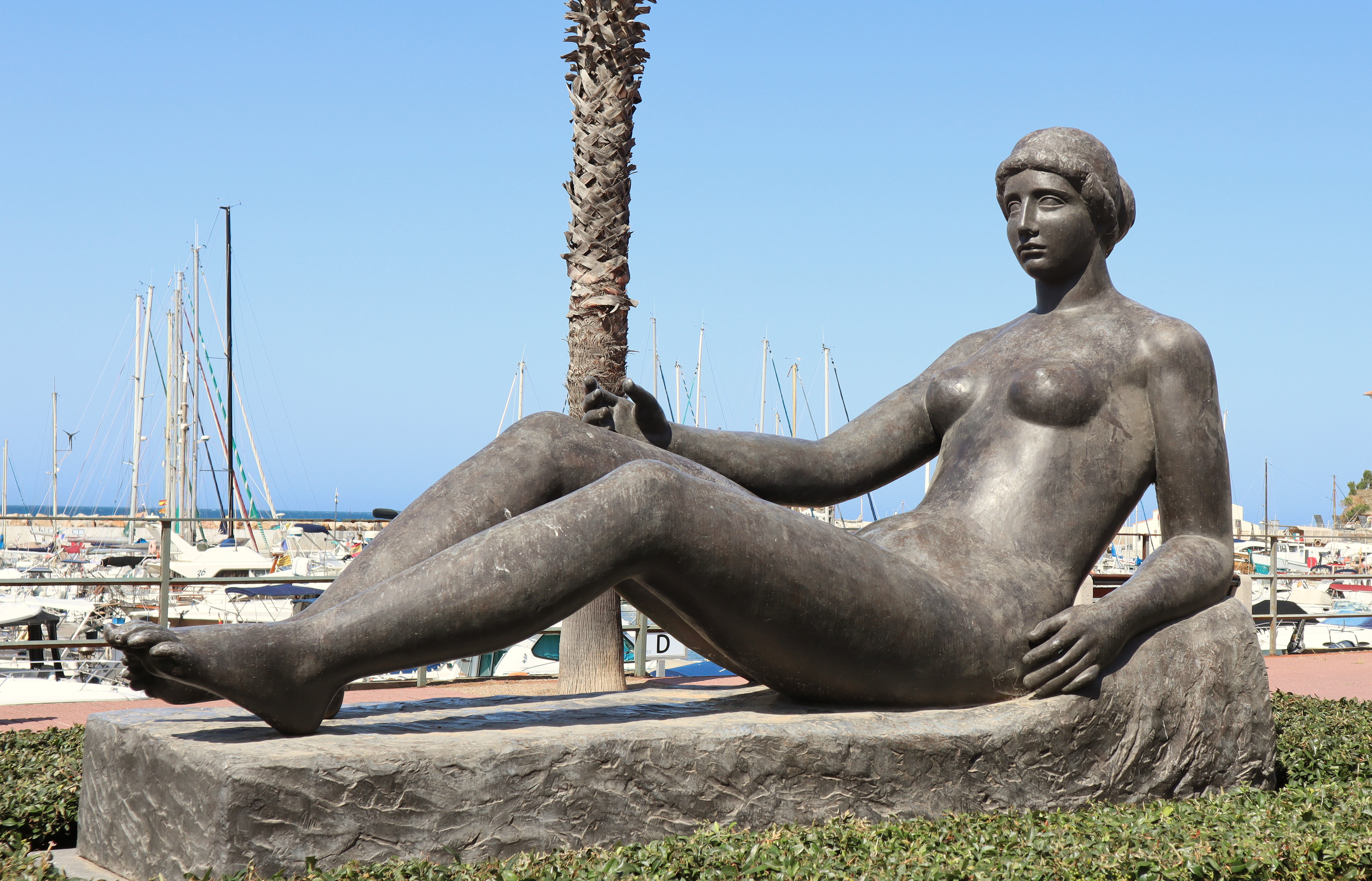
Jeune fille allongée

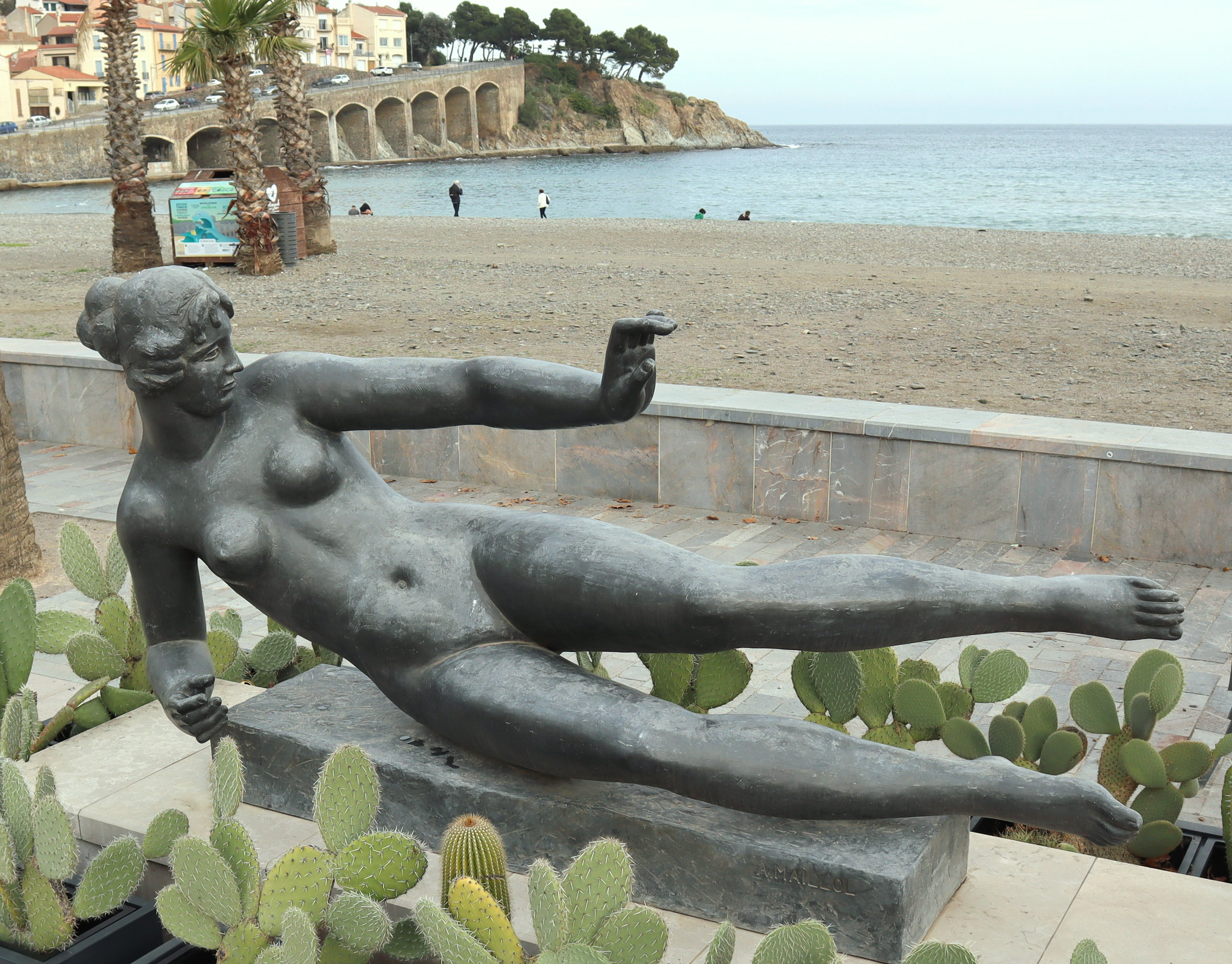
L'Air

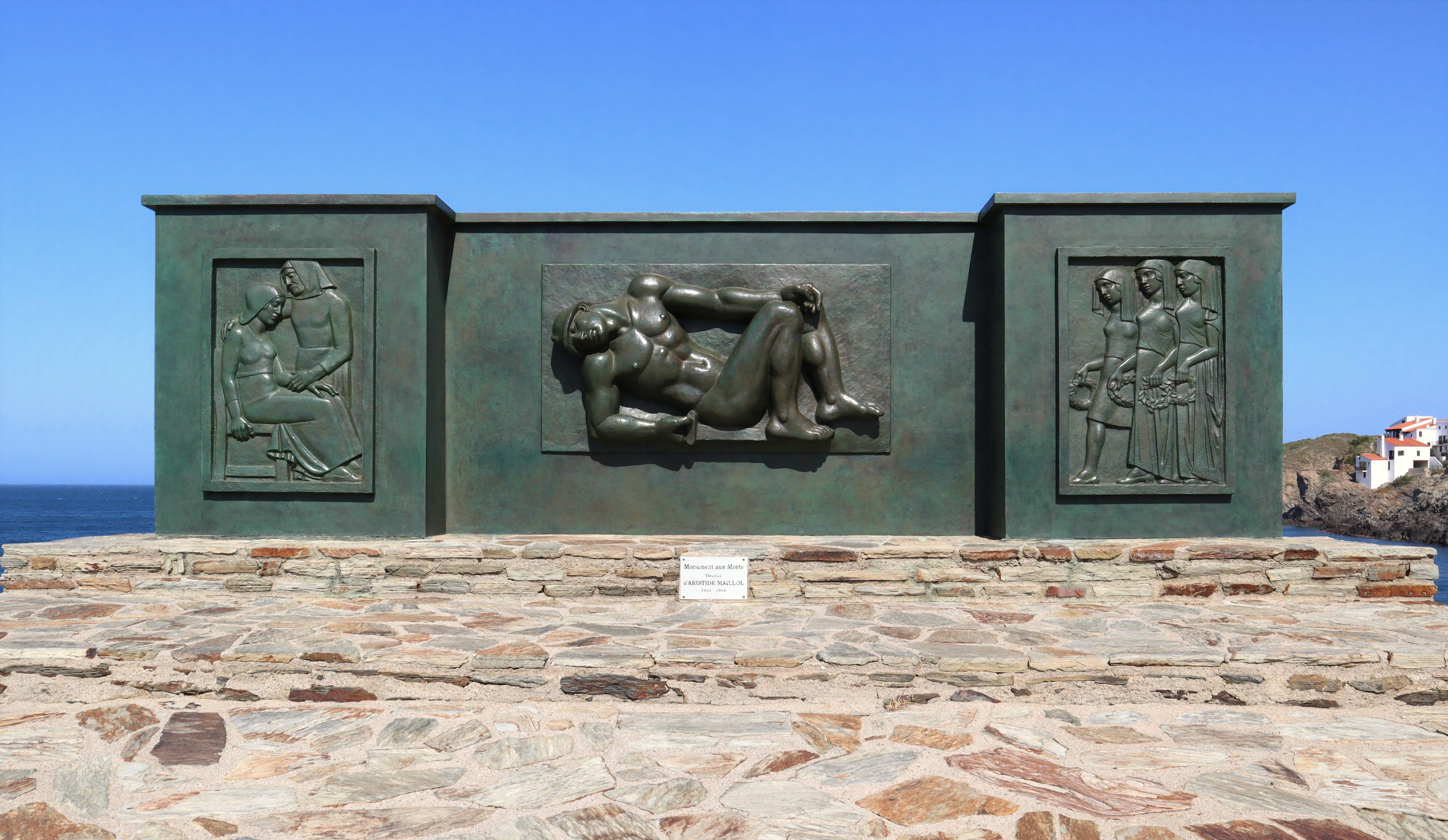
War memorial (bronze)

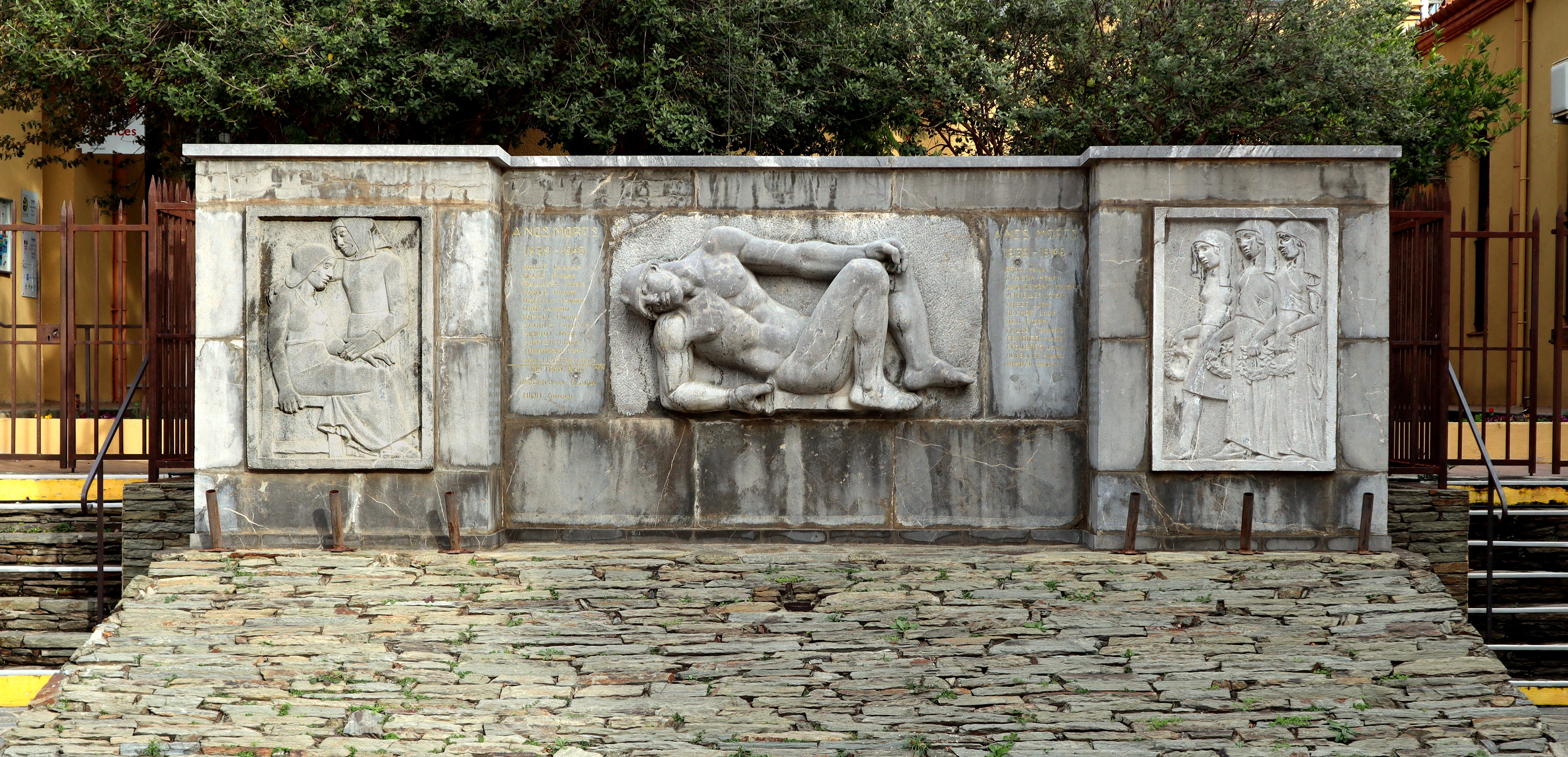
War memorial (stone)

== Notable people ==
- Aristide Maillol (1861–1944), French sculptor and painter, born and died in Banyuls-sur-Mer. Maillol was very much part of the turn of the century art scene, friends with Matisse, Derain, Picasso, Dalí. A sculpture of Dina Vierny, aged 17, his last muse and model, and a member of the French Resistance, stands beneath the huge jacaranda tree behind the town hall.
- Emil Racoviță (1868–1947), Romanian polar explorer, former co-director of the Arago laboratory.
- Jean de La Hire (1878–1956), writer born in Banyuls-sur-Mer.
- Marc Eyraud (1924–2005), actor, died in Banyuls-sur-Mer.
- Nils Seethaler (*1981), German cultural anthropologist, spent parts of his childhood in Banyuls-sur-Mer.

== See also ==
- Communes of the Pyrénées-Orientales department
