= Musée Maillol =

Museum in Paris

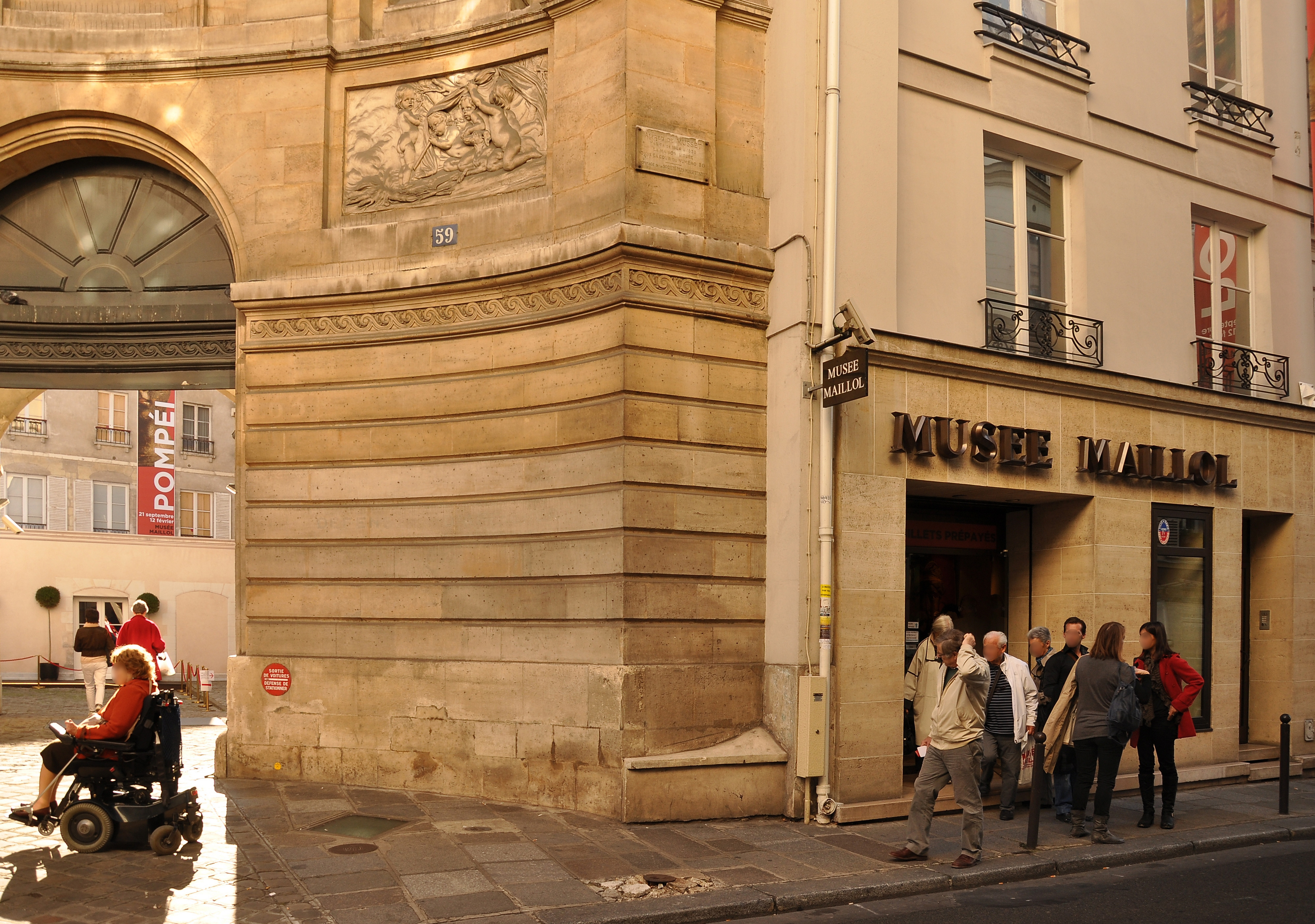
- Established: 1995
- Location: Paris
- Coordinates: 48°51′17.2″N 2°19′29.6″E
- Type: Art Museum
- Website: www.museemaillol.com

The Musée Maillol is an art museum located in the 7th arrondissement at 59–61, rue de Grenelle, Paris, France.

== History ==
In 1964, Dina Vierny donated Maillol's monumental sculptures to the state. André Malraux, Minister of Culture, installs them in the open air in the Tuileries Garden. The same year, she created her foundation, the aim of which was to make the work of Aristide Maillol known to the public.

The museum was established in 1995 by Dina Vierny. On January 20, 1995, the Maillol museum was inaugurated in a mansion in the 7th arrondissement of Paris, the Bouchardon hotel. Its renovation, led by Dina Vierny and the architect Pierre Devinoy, lasted more than fifteen years. On this occasion, he rehabilitated the basement to accommodate the restaurant which had previously been the Cabaret La Fontaine des Quatre-Saisons since 1951, opened by the Les Frères Jacques and Pierre Prévert.

The space of the Maillol museum today offers some 4,250 m^{2} of surface area. In addition to the rooms devoted to the works of Maillol and the permanent collections, there are spaces for hosting temporary exhibitions.

In February 2015, the establishment was in crisis following the judicial liquidation of the company Tecniarte, which had organized all the gallery's exhibitions since the death of Dina Vierny in 2009. The exhibition on "Le Baiser dans l' art: from the Renaissance to the present day", scheduled from March 25, is officially postponed.

In 2016, the museum resumed its activities with a program entrusted to Culturespaces (Engie) which terminated its contract in 2020.

In 2021, the reopening of the museum is managed directly by the heirs of Dina Vierny, with the support of the Belgian cultural operator Tempora.

== Collection ==
It presents the works of Maillol (drawings, engravings, paintings, sculptures, decorative art, original plaster and terracotta work) along with other works from Vierny's private collection:

- Masters of French naïve art including a painting by Henri Rousseau
- Drawings by Paul Cézanne, Edgar Degas, Jean Auguste Dominique Ingres, Henri Matisse, Pablo Picasso, Suzanne Valadon, and Tsuguharu Foujita
- Drawings and watercolours by Raoul Dufy
- Paintings by Pierre Bonnard and Serge Poliakoff
- Lithographic work by Odilon Redon
- Woodcuts and watercolours by Paul Gauguin
- Sculptures by Auguste Rodin
- Works by Wassily Kandinsky, Marcel Duchamp, Raymond Duchamp-Villon, Robert Couturier, and Jacques Villon
- Works of Russian artists including Eric Bulatov, Oscar Rabine, and Vladimir Yankilevsky

The museum is open daily, including Tuesdays; an admission fee is charged.

== See also ==
- List of museums in Paris
- Musée Maillol Banyuls-sur-Mer
- List of single-artist museums
