= Dina Vierny =

French artists' model, singer, art dealer, collector and museum director

- Vierny (left) with Aristide Maillol
- Born: Dina Aibinder; January 25, 1919; Chișinău
- Died: January 20, 2009 (aged 89); Paris
- Occupations: art dealer, collector, museum director, art model
- Awards: Legion of Honour

Dina Vierny (25 January 1919 – 20 January 2009) was a French artists' model who became a singer, art dealer, collector and museum director. She is known as the model and muse to French sculptor Aristide Maillol. In 1995, she established the Musée Maillol.

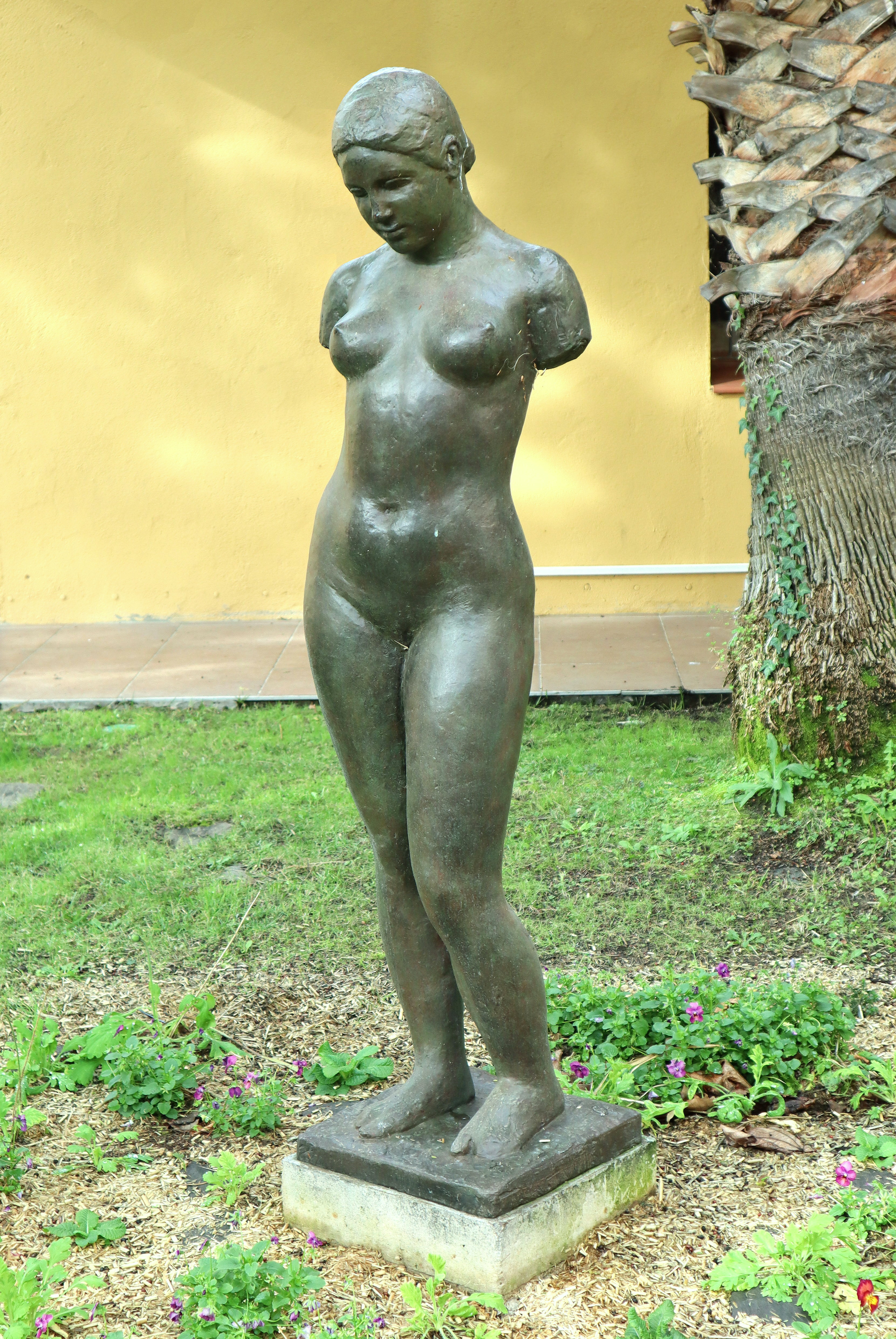
Dina esquisse pour l‘harmonie by Aristide Maillol in Banyuls-sur-Mer

== Biography ==
Born as Dina Aibinder into a Jewish family in Kishinev, Bessarabia (now Chișinău, Moldova), she moved to France with her family during her childhood.

Beginning at age 15, she was Aristide Maillol's muse for ten years, until his death in 1944 in a car crash. After two years of modeling while clothed, she began work as a nude model. During her career as a model, she also posed for Henri Matisse, Raoul Dufy, and Pierre Bonnard.

Both Matisse and Bonnard attributed a renewed inspiration for painting and sculpture to Vierny.

After Maillol moved to Banyuls-sur-Mer in 1939, she worked as a guide for the organization founded by Varian Fry to smuggle refugees out of occupied France during World War II. She was arrested by police in France and acquitted after a trial, and then left temporarily for Nice to pose for Henri Matisse before returning to Banyuls-sur-Mer. She was arrested by the Gestapo in 1943 and spent six months in prison.

In 1947, she opened an art gallery in the Saint-Germain-des-Pres district of Paris. In 1964, she donated 18 Maillol sculptures to France for installation in the Jardin des Tuileries.

In 1995, she founded the Fondation Dina Vierny-Musée Maillol and opened the Musée Maillol.

== Death ==
Vierny died in Paris, five days before her 90th birthday. She was survived by her two sons, Olivier Lorquin, director of the Musée Maillol in Paris, and art historian Bertrand Lorquin, the museum's curator.
