= Vermilion Coast Tracks =

The Vermilion Coast Tracks follow the mediterranean coastline of the Pyrenees from Argelès-sur-Mer to Cerbère the border town with Spain. Passing through several types of forest, and vineyards, this tracks often provides excellent views over the sea. It is classified as one of Pyrénées-Orientales's Great Hikes, and is located in the Massane Forest Natural Reserve.

== Hiking on the Vermilion Coast ==
The trailheads are at Cerbère, and Argelès, on the southern and northern edges of the Vermilion coast respectively. Most people take 1 to 2 days to complete the trails.

The trails passes through several areas of private land, and touches the edge of the Cerbère-Banyuls Natural Marine Reserve where a special scuba diving underwater trail is open to the public in the summer.

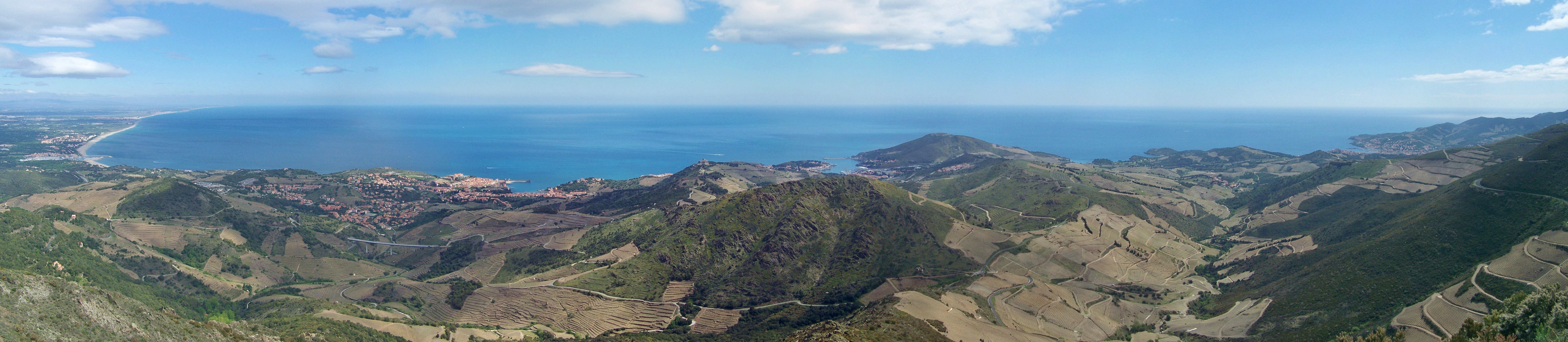
View of the Vermilion Coast from the Madeloc Tower. Overlooking Argelès-sur-Mer, Collioure, Port-Vendres and Banyuls-sur-Mer.

=== Cerbère to Banyuls by the Torre de Querroig ===
12km [7.5 miles], approximately 5 hours. A technical route for experienced walkers. Unsuitable in high winds. Starting in the village of Puig del Mas, follow the path that Jewish writer, Walter Benjamin and friends took to escape Nazi persecution in occupied France. Climb to The 13th century Torre de Querroig (672m).

=== Port Vendres to Banyuls by the Littoral Trail ===
12km [7.5 miles], approximately 4 hours. This trail can be done back and forth, in any direction. A well maintained path but the cliffs can be dangerous if it is windy, and the wind can be extremely strong at Cap Bear. The walk takes in the historic site of Paullilles, the 18th century museum, Redoute Bear and the active military installation, Fort Bear.

=== The Madeloc Tower & Military Installations ===
21.5km [13.5 miles], approximately 6 hours. Intermediate level with some technical areas. Begin from Place de l'Obélisque, in Port Vendres, walking via Cosprons, Fortress Galline, Batterie 500, Tour de Madeloc (656m), Batterie Taillefer, Fort Dugommier & Fort St Elme before dropping back to Port Vendres.

=== The Ultrera Castle ===
7km [3 miles], approximately 4 hours. Some steep climbs/descents and rocky ledges. Starting in La Vall (between Sorède and Argelès-sur-Mer) the walk climbs up to the Château d'Ultrera, passing the 10th century Chapelle de la Pavé.

== See also ==
- Hiking in the Pyrénées-Orientales
