= Route départementale 914 =

Scenic coastal route from Perpignan to Spanish border

Coordinates: 42.55359°N 3.0336°E

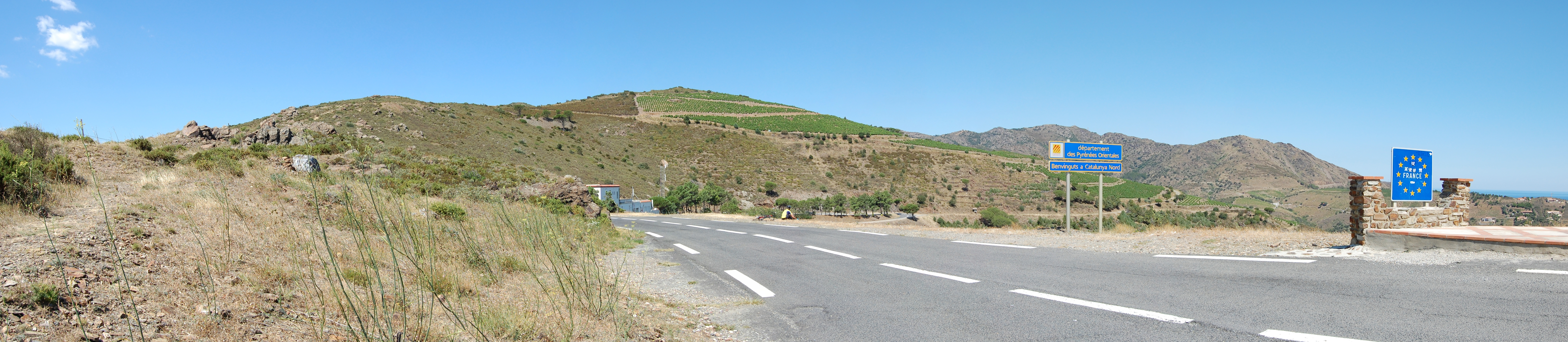
The end of the RD914, at the Balistres Pass, French - Spanish border, July 27, 2008

The Route Départementale 914 or RD 914 is the scenic route by the Mediterranean Sea, between Perpignan and Cerbère, at the Spanish border. Formerly named Route Nationale 114, or RN 114 before being handed to the département of Pyrénées-Orientales, on December 9 2005. It becomes the Spanish National Road N-260 or Eix Pirenenc (in Catalan) as it crosses the border toward Portbou.

The N-260 is about to be upgraded into a highway, the "Autovía del Eje Pirenaico" (in Spanish) or "Autovia del Eix Pirenenc" (in Catalan), the Autovía A-26.

See the Route Départementale 914 on GoogleMaps

== From Perpignan to Cerbère ==
- Perpignan (km 0)
- Corneilla-del-Vercol
- Elne (km 13)
- Argelès-sur-Mer (km 21)
- Collioure (km 27)
- Port-Vendres (km 30)
- Paulilles (km 33)
- Banyuls-sur-Mer (km 36)
- Cerbère (km 45)
- Col des Balistres

== See also ==
- Côte Vermeille
