= Henri de Jordan =

French painter

Henri de Jordan born in Algiers on September 13, 1944, died on January 31, 1996 in Royan, , was a French painter. Most of Henri de Jordan’s career spanned from 1970 to 1996.

Georges-Henry Gourrier said of him:

Henri de Jordan learned very early the importance of light. He had a sensual and sometimes violent passion for landscapes, nourished by the constant Mediterranean sunlight. His canvases, structured in large horizontal planes of thick and fluid material depending on the desired luminosity, express a sensitivity to nature of aristocratic refinement. His greens, blues, pinks and reddish tones bring to his compositions a distinguished stylistic character and the fullness of a certain joy of painting.

== Biography ==
=== Family ===
Henri de Jordan was born on September 13, 1944, in Algiers. His father was a painter and his mother was Catalan, descended from the Güell family.

He left Algeria after a few months for the Pyrénées-Orientales. He spent his childhood between the Côte Vermeille and Cerdagne, where his taste for color and wide open spaces was born.

=== The artist ===
At the age of 13, he won first prize in "C'est Jeudi" of Jean Nohain, competition as well as the honourable mention and congratulations from the Nice auditorium jury. At the very beginning of the 1960s, he joined the École supérieure Tessier de Tours.

He was later noticed in Perpignan by Firmin Bauby in Sant Vicens. There he discovered painting on ceramics and art tapestry. He worked with Jean Picart le Doux and Jean Lurçat with whom he maintained a long friendship. He had also met Dali, Picasso in art circles.

At the end of the 1960s, alongside Firmin Bauby, he travelled around the world for two years in more than forty countries and territories. He brought back a series of pictures that he kept all his life. Like Paul Gauguin, the colors of French Polynesia marked him . But also Brazil, Guatemala, Argentina, Mexico, Japan, Iran, India, Egypt, Lebanon, Hong Kong, New York...

Upon returning to France, he definitively launched his career as a painter. From 1968 to 1978 he settled in Narbonne between the sea and Corbières. Then, until 1982 in Fanjeaux. Then he went to Grenoble to immerse himself in these crowns of mountains and their lights. He opened a gallery there on avenue Alsace-Lorraine. A few years later, he retired to calm in the Drôme for a few years. In 1990, he settled in Royan in Charente-Maritime which he never left.

During his career, he exhibited all over the world.
