= Maureillas-las-Illas =

- Commune
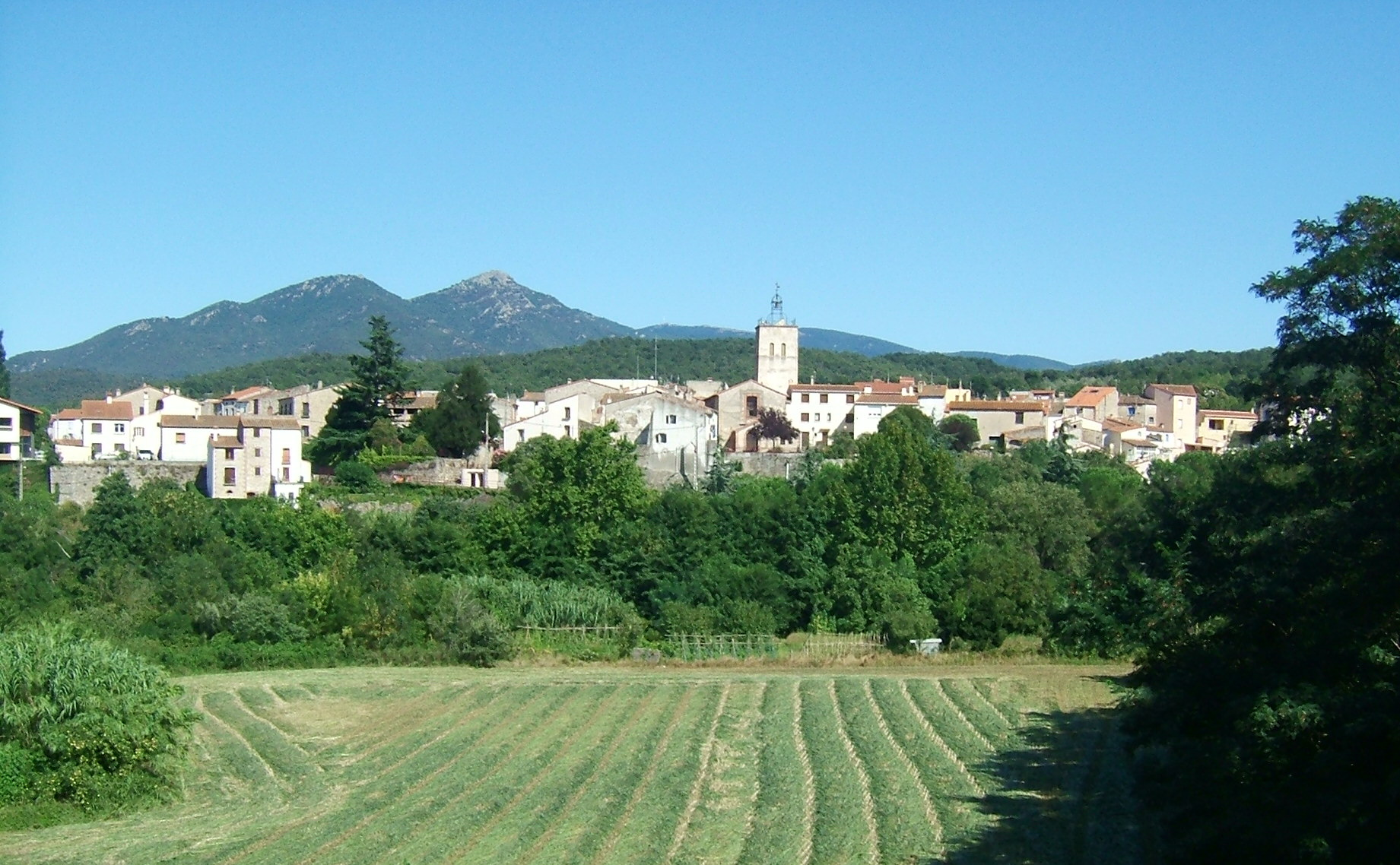
- A general view of Maureillas-las-Illas
- Location of Maureillas-las-Illas
- Location within France Location within Occitanie
- Coordinates: 42°29′29″N 2°48′39″E
- Country: France
- Region: Occitania
- Department: Pyrénées-Orientales
- Arrondissement: Céret
- Canton: Vallespir-Albères
- Intercommunality: Vallespir

Government
  - Mayor (2020–2026): Jean Vila
- Area^{1}: 42.10 km^{2} (16.25 sq mi)
- Elevation: 154 m (505 ft)
- Highest elevation: 1,320 m (4,330 ft)
- Lowest elevation: 78 m (256 ft)
- Population (2023): 3,006
  - Density: 71.40/km^{2} (184.9/sq mi)
- Time zone: UTC+01:00 (CET)
  - Summer (DST): UTC+02:00 (CEST)
- INSEE/Postal code: 66106 /66480
- ^{1} French Land Register data, which excludes lakes, ponds, glaciers > 1 km^{2} (0.386 sq mi or 247 acres) and river estuaries.

Maureillas-las-Illas (French pronunciation: [moʁɛjas laz‿ijas]; Catalan: Morellàs i les Illes) is a rural commune in the Vallespir, Pyrénées-Orientales in the south of France. The commune belongs to the Communauté de communes of Vallespir uniting Maureillas-las-Illas with nine other communes.

== Geography ==
=== Localisation ===
Maureillas-las-Illas is located in the canton of Vallespir-Albères and in the arrondissement of Céret. It lies east of Céret and north of the Spanish border.

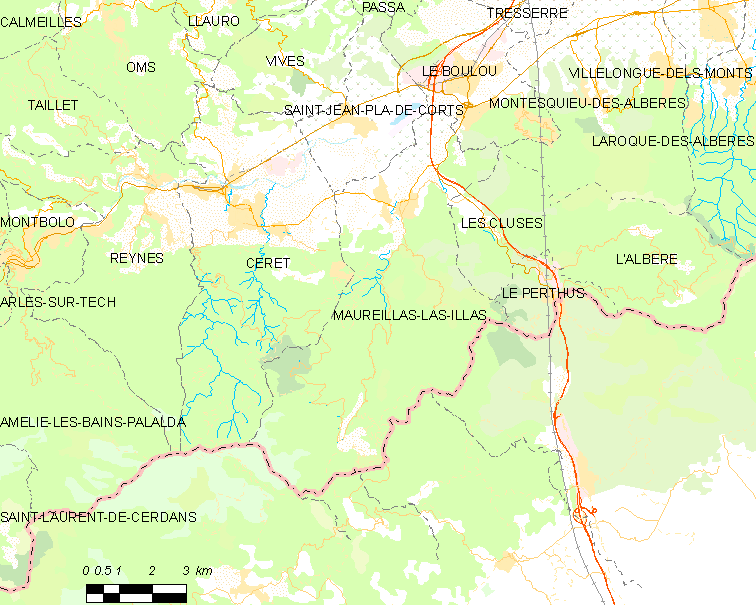
Maureillas-las-Illas and its surrounding communes

== Toponymy ==
Names

The first mention of the village under the name Maurelianum was in 1011. The name is then written as Maurelanis in the 12th century, Maurellans and Maurellas in the 15th century and finally Maurallas or Maurellas since the 17th century.

Maurellas is the Catalan spelling, Maureillas is its French transcription.

Etymology

Maureillas is probably issued from the name of a Roman landowner, Maurelius, followed by the -anos suffix (plural of -anum). It has nothing to do with the Moors.

== History ==
Until recently, the dolmen of Siuréda was still hidden by a thick vegetation but its discovery shows that the prehistoric man of Chalcolithic, roughly 3500 to 1700 BC, lived in the hills above Maureillas.

The history of Maureillas as a settlement goes back to antiquity. Founded by the Romans as a small settlement, the village remained small until the Charlemagne conquest Saracens in 811.

In the Middle Ages the village grew around the church of Saint Etienne, built in the 10th century. In 1400, residents built a new chapel outside the walls of the village. It was dedicated to Saint John of Mauranells.

Maureillas was a place of residence for the powerful Oms family, but there are no remains left of the possessions of this family. However, the village of Les Cluses belonged to them from the 7th century.

The commune of Saint-Martin de Fenollar was merged with Maureillas in 1823. In 1972, the villages of Las Illas and Riunoguès were also incorporated into the commune.

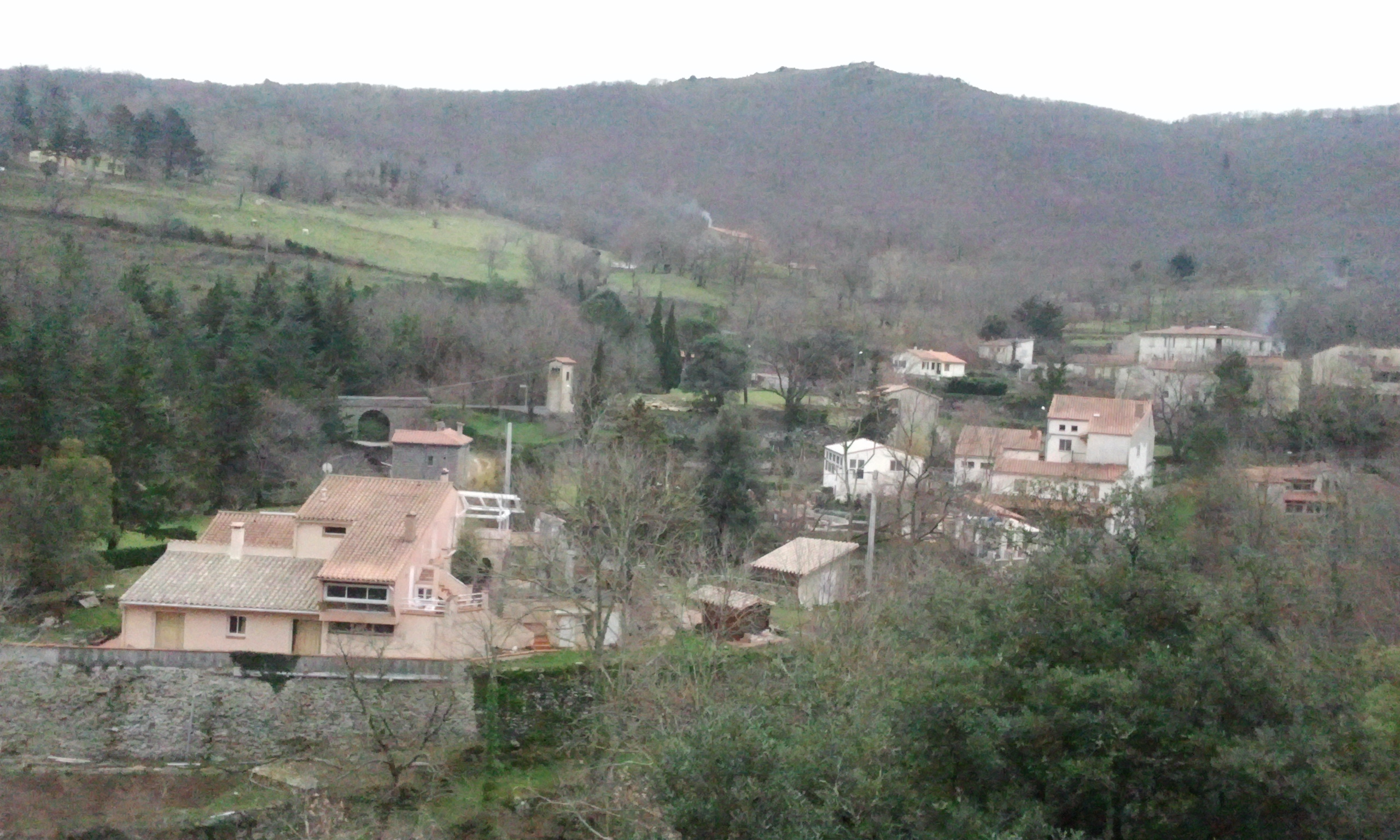
Las Illas

Las Illas is in the deep confines of a valley leading to the Col of Panissars, on the border with Spain, and the Trophy of Pompey. This is the second most southerly town in mainland France after Lamanère. In the 9th century, the passage was so important that the clergy of Arles-sur-Tech built a church dedicated to Notre Dame du Remède there. In the 11th century, it was bequeathed to the monastery of Ripoll which built a priory.

Las-Illas was notorious in the 19th century for the groups of outlaws who took refuge in the surrounding caves, the famous Trabucayres.

=== The Trabucayres ===
The Trabucayres are famous mountain outlaws, bands of individuals who, on behalf of social banditry, political or foul, robbed, kidnapped, and ransomed coaches, landowners and farmers from 1837 to 1846. The name comes from the Catalan word "trabuc", a short-barreled shotgun used at that time.

Despite their cruelty, the Trabucayres were treated as avengers of social injustice. This feeling was strengthened because their crimes were addressed to the "bourgeoisie". In addition, Trabucayres preceded their acts with religious rituals to absolve them from all sin, thus reinforcing their popularity among common people. The legend is still alive and a source of pride among border populations.

== Government and politics ==
=== Mayors ===
Mayor	Term start	Term end
Jean-Daniel Amiot	1989	2008
André Bordaneil	2008	2020
Jean Vila	2020	incumbent

== Population ==
Historical population

Year	Pop.	±% p.a.
1793	360	—
1800	427	+2.47%
1806	594	+5.66%
1821	750	+1.57%
1831	903	+1.87%
1836	943	+0.87%
1841	974	+0.65%
1846	1,019	+0.91%
1851	1,047	+0.54%
1856	1,115	+1.27%
1861	1,199	+1.46%
1866	1,239	+0.66%
1872	1,407	+2.14%
1876	1,487	+1.39%
1881	1,502	+0.20%
1886	1,348	−2.14%
1891	1,375	+0.40%
1896	1,386	+0.16%
1901	1,333	−0.78%

Year	Pop.	±% p.a.
1906	1,308	−0.38%
1911	1,324	+0.24%
1921	1,239	−0.66%
1926	1,177	−1.02%
1931	1,216	+0.65%
1936	1,120	−1.63%
1946	1,081	−0.35%
1954	1,068	−0.15%
1962	1,093	+0.29%
1968	1,108	+0.23%
1975	1,370	+3.08%
1982	1,706	+3.18%
1990	2,037	+2.24%
1999	2,281	+1.26%
2007	2,594	+1.62%
2012	2,679	+0.65%
2017	2,544	−1.03%
2023	3,006	+2.82%

Source: EHESS and INSEE

== Economy ==
=== Cultivation of cork oak ===
Until the 1950s, still half of the population of Maureillas worked in the cork oak industry, now almost extinct. The Museum of Cork Oak of Maureillas has been created to tell the history of this past activity.

== Sites of interest ==
- Saint-Martin-de-Fenollar chapel
- Saint-Michel de Riunoguès church
- Saint-Étienne de Maureillas church
- Church of Notre-Dame du Remède
- Dolmen of Siuréda
- Ruins of the Bel Ull watch tower

== Gallery ==
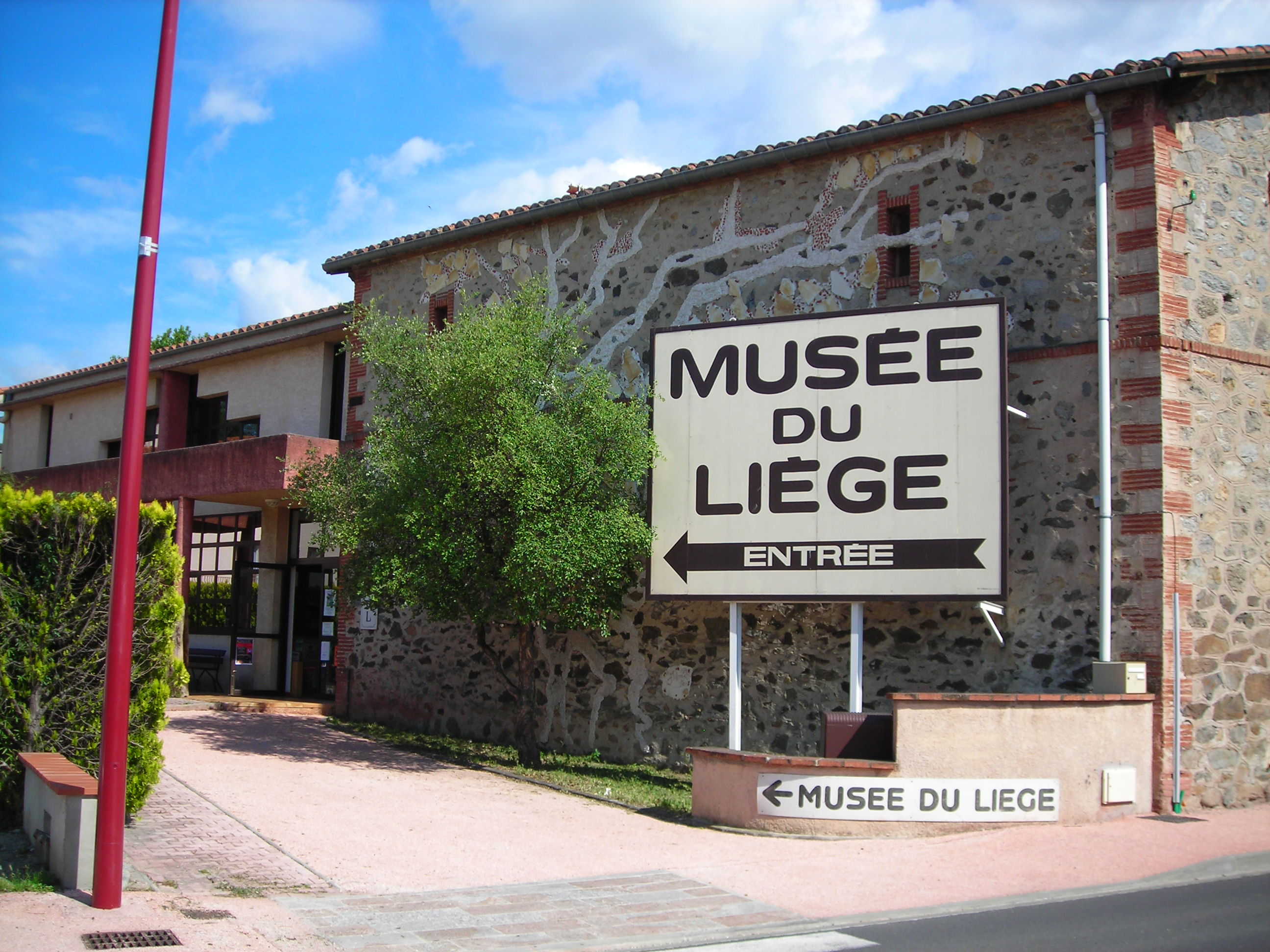
Cork Museum of Maureillas.

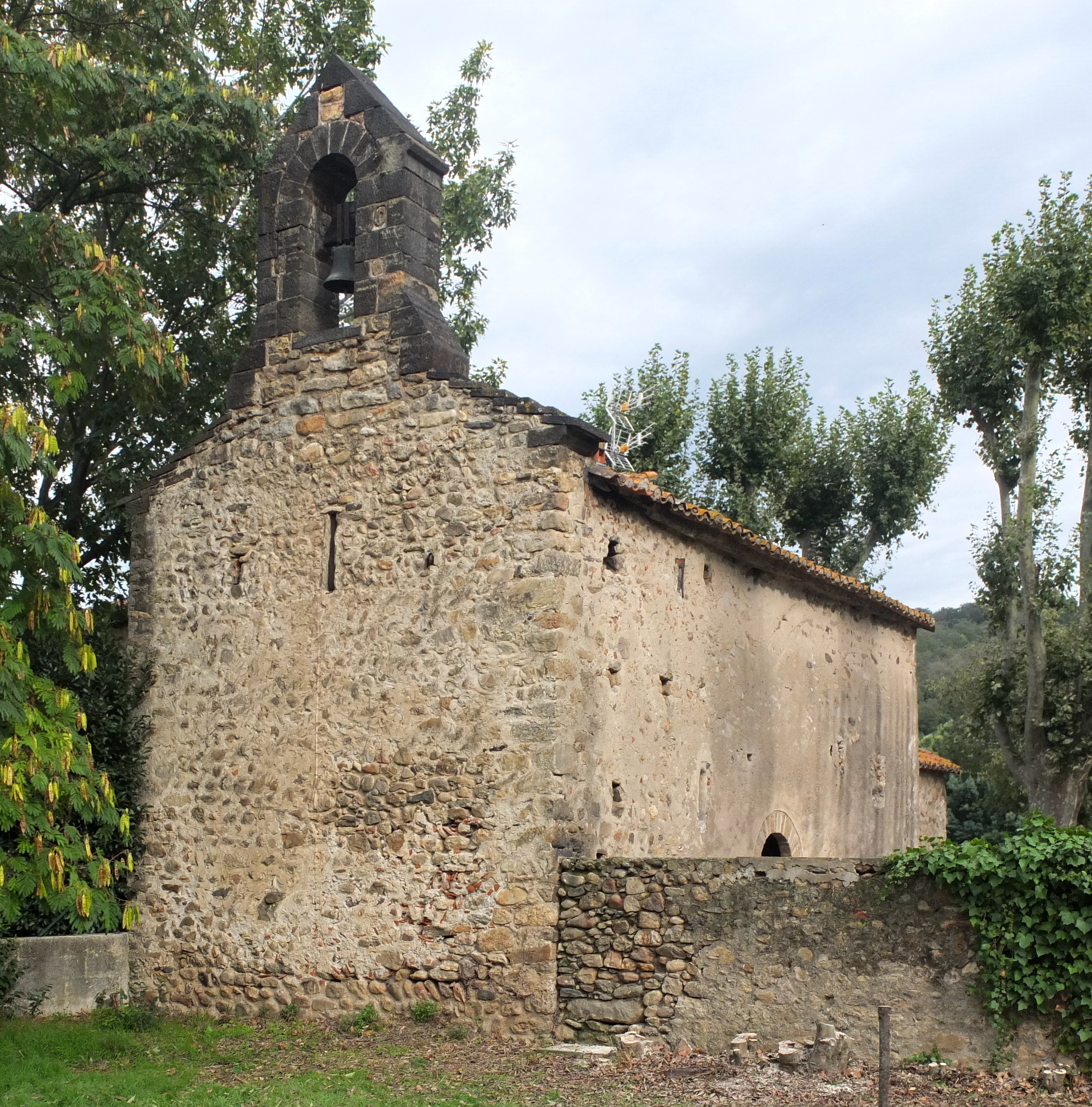
Saint-Martin-de-Fenollar chapel

== See also ==
- Communes of the Pyrénées-Orientales department
- Hiking in the Pyrénées-Orientales
- The Siureda dolmen
