= Paulilles =

Protected area in France

Coordinates: 42°30′05″N 3°07′25″E

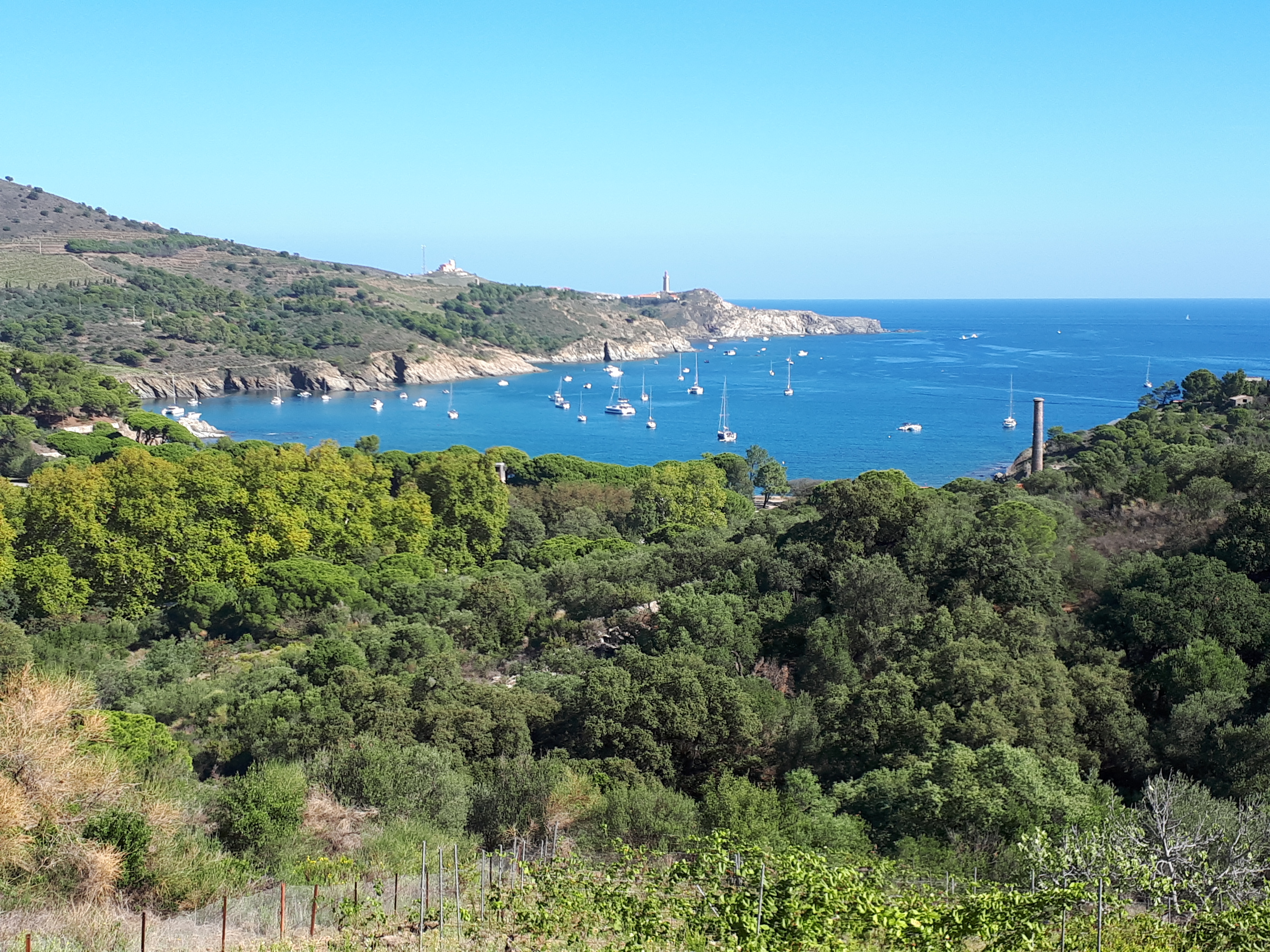
Paulilles

Paulilles (Catalan: Polilles) is a protected area on the Mediterranean Sea, located between the towns of Port-Vendres, and Banyuls-sur-Mer in Pyrénées-Orientales, North Catalonia, France.

== History ==
=== The Dynamite Factory ===
Paulilles Recreational Park occupies a rehabilitated dynamite factory site protected as an ecological network by the Natura 2000 European organisation. Originally serving as the French Nobel Dynamite Factory, it was created by Nobel's associate in France, Paul François Barbe, and built in 1870. Several accidents over the years caused multiple deaths: the most important ones killed 20 workers in 1882 and 5 in 1885.

=== Protecting the environment ===
In July 1991, the installations were closed by the Société nationale des poudres et des explosifs (SNPE), and later sold to the Conservatoire du littoral in 1998 to protect the area from real estate developers. In 2005, the General Council of the Pyrénées-Orientales launched the renovation to ready 9 buildings, destroy nearly 70, and landscape 17 hectares to turn Paulilles into a free and ecological recreational park, a museum on the industrial heritage of the factory and a traditional Catalan boat repair facility . Paulilles opens to the public in June 2008.

== Geography ==
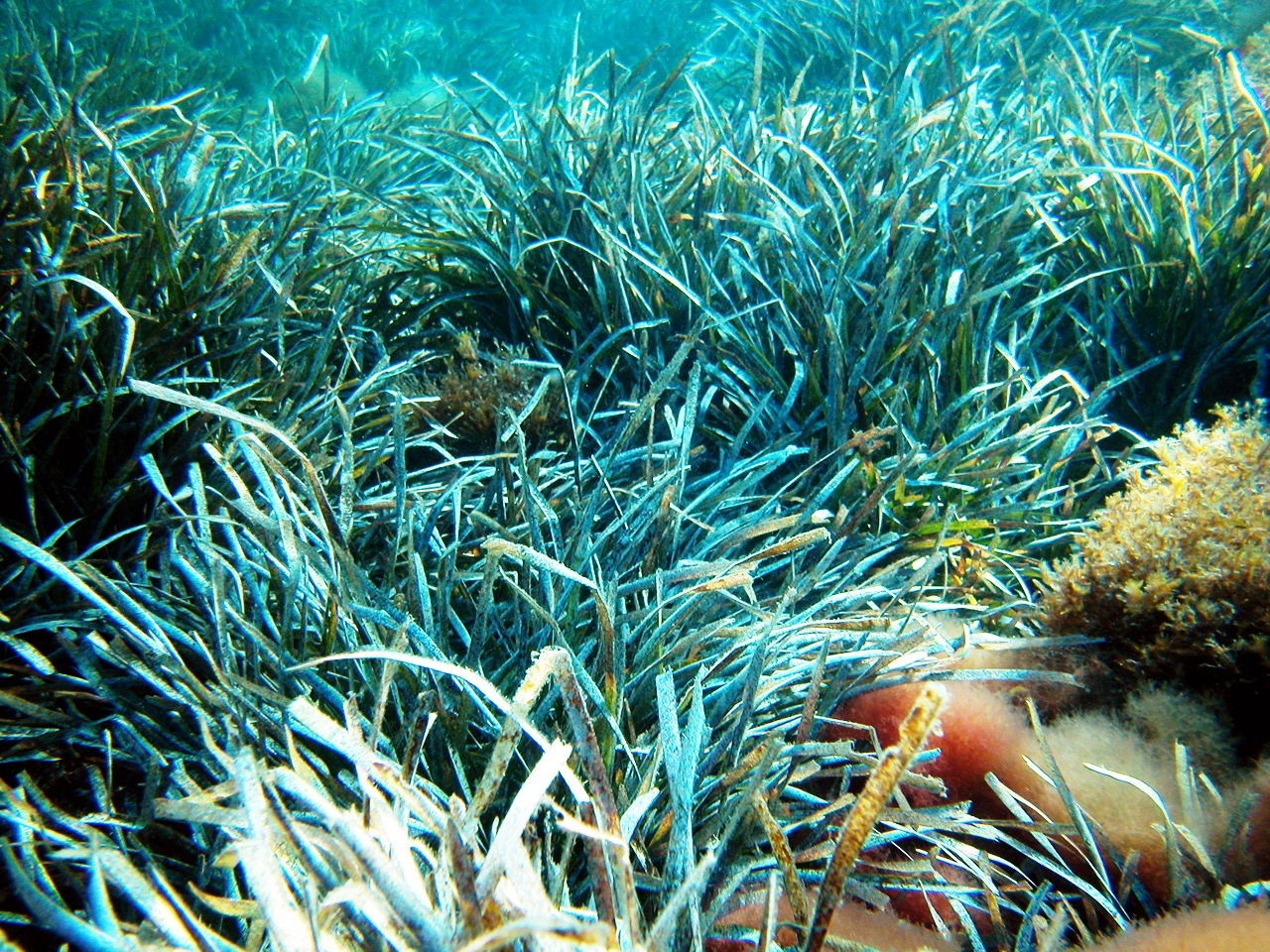
Posidonia

Paulilles is located about 2 miles (3 km) south of Port-Vendres behind the Las Portas pass along the scenic Route départementale 914. It is a small scale Mediterranean bay, forming a prairie down to the sea between the Béar cape, and the Oullestrell cape and forms three beaches: Bernardi, del Mitg, Fourat separated by small cliffs in the bay. The original forest has been well preserved and is typical of the Mediterranean region. It is composed of Aleppo pine (Pinus halepensis), maritime pine (Pinus pinaster), stone pine (Pinus pinea), for the Pinaceae) family. Also holm oak (Quercus ilex), cork oak (Quercus suber) and olive trees (Olea europaea ). Local flora is well represented with the Armeria of Roussillon (Armeria ruscinonensis), the polycarpon of Catalonia (Polycarpon polycarpoides), Thymelaea hirsuta, Limonium tremolsii, and also Tamarix (Tamaricaceae), and gattiliers (Vitex agnus-castus).

All the waters around Paulilles are also protected by Natura 2000, for its Posidonia oceanica, a species of seagrass that is endemic to the Mediterranean Sea and Coralline algaes that offers shelter and nursing home for the rich aquatic life. This marine plants forms large underwater meadows of high importance to the environmental conservation of the region.

== Recreational opportunities ==
- Biking
- Hiking
- Walking
- Bird watching
- Swimming
- Scuba diving

== See also ==
- Côte Vermeille
- European Route of Industrial Heritage
