= Las Illas =

French former commune

Coordinates: 42°25′33″N 2°47′06″E

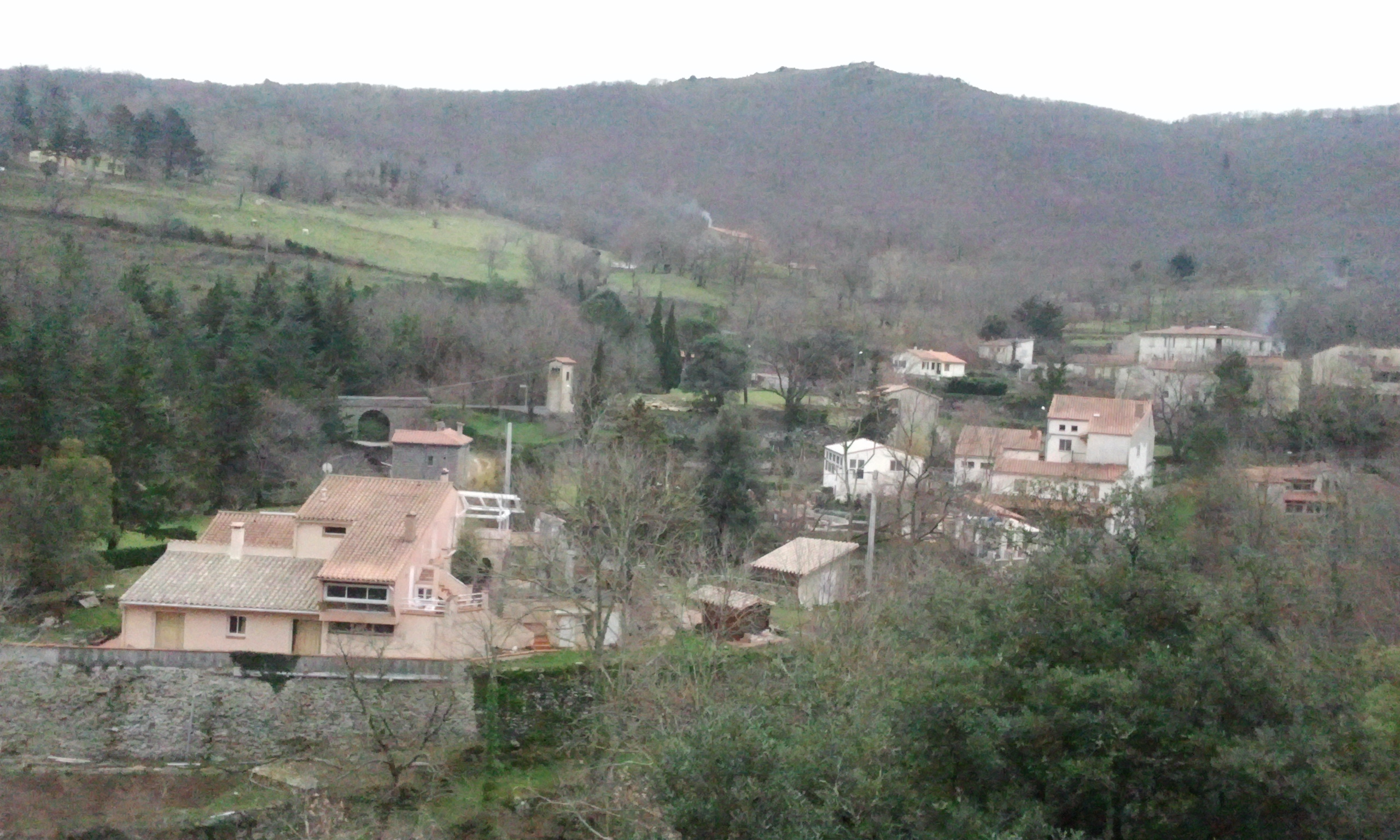
Las Illas

Las Illas (in Catalan: Les Illes) is a former commune in Pyrénées-Orientales (France), now part of Maureillas-las-Illas.

== Geography ==
Las Illas is located south of Maureillas and north of Maçanet de Cabrenys (Catalonia, Spain).

== History ==
Las Illas became a commune in 1790.

Las Illas was only linked to the electricity network on 26 July 1955. The commune had repeatedly asked to have electricity since 1923.

On 20 June 1972, Las Illas was linked with Maureillas and Riunoguès to create the new commune of Maureillas-las-Illas.

== Politics and administration ==
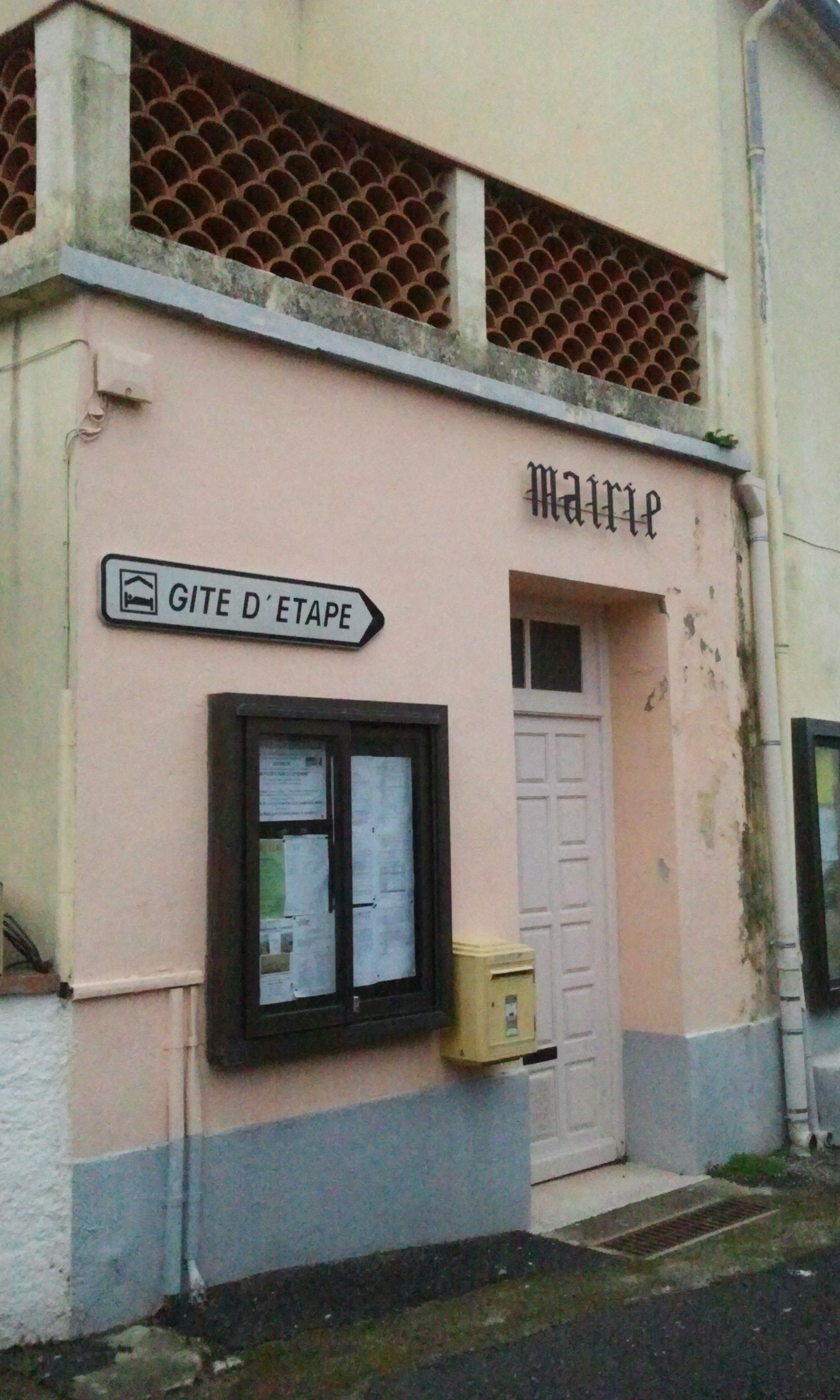
The town hall

=== Mayors ===
Mayor	Term start	Term end
François Dabouzi	1945	1947
Antoine Auriol	1947	1952
François Dabouzi	1952	1953
Marguerite Dabouzi	March 1965	June 1965
René Guidicelli	1965?	?
Raymond Commenge	?	1972

== Demography ==
Demography of Las Illas.

Population under the Ancien Régime is calculated either in number of feu fiscal (f, fire tax), or in number of inhabitants.

1365 f	1378 f	1470 f	1515 f	1553 f	1720 f	1730 f	1755 f	1767	1774	1789 f	1794	1795	1796
14	12	4	4	3	5	7	20	110	84	24	91	101	104

1800	1804	1806	1820	1826	1831	1836	1841	1846	1851	1856	1861	1866	1872	1876	1881
131	122	129	205	236	269	249	233	281	289	305	280	264	314	237	237

1886	1891	1896	1901	1906	1911	1921	1926	1931	1936	1946	1954	1962	1968
228	198	181	191	209	192	119	119	85	84	119	67	57	60

After 1975, see Maureillas-las-Illas#Population

== Sites of interest ==
- The romanesque church of Notre-Dame du Remède.
- The war memorial.
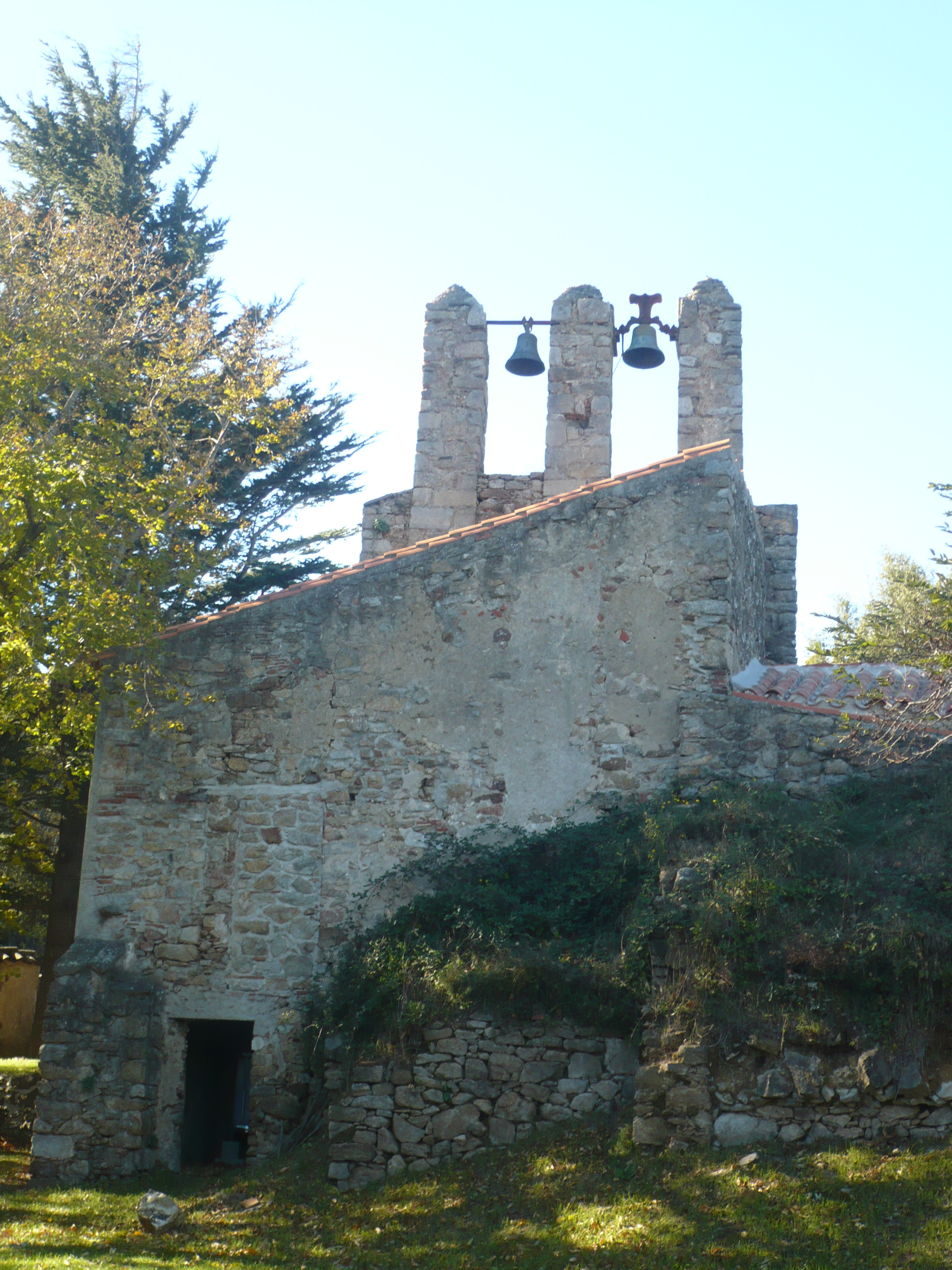
The church

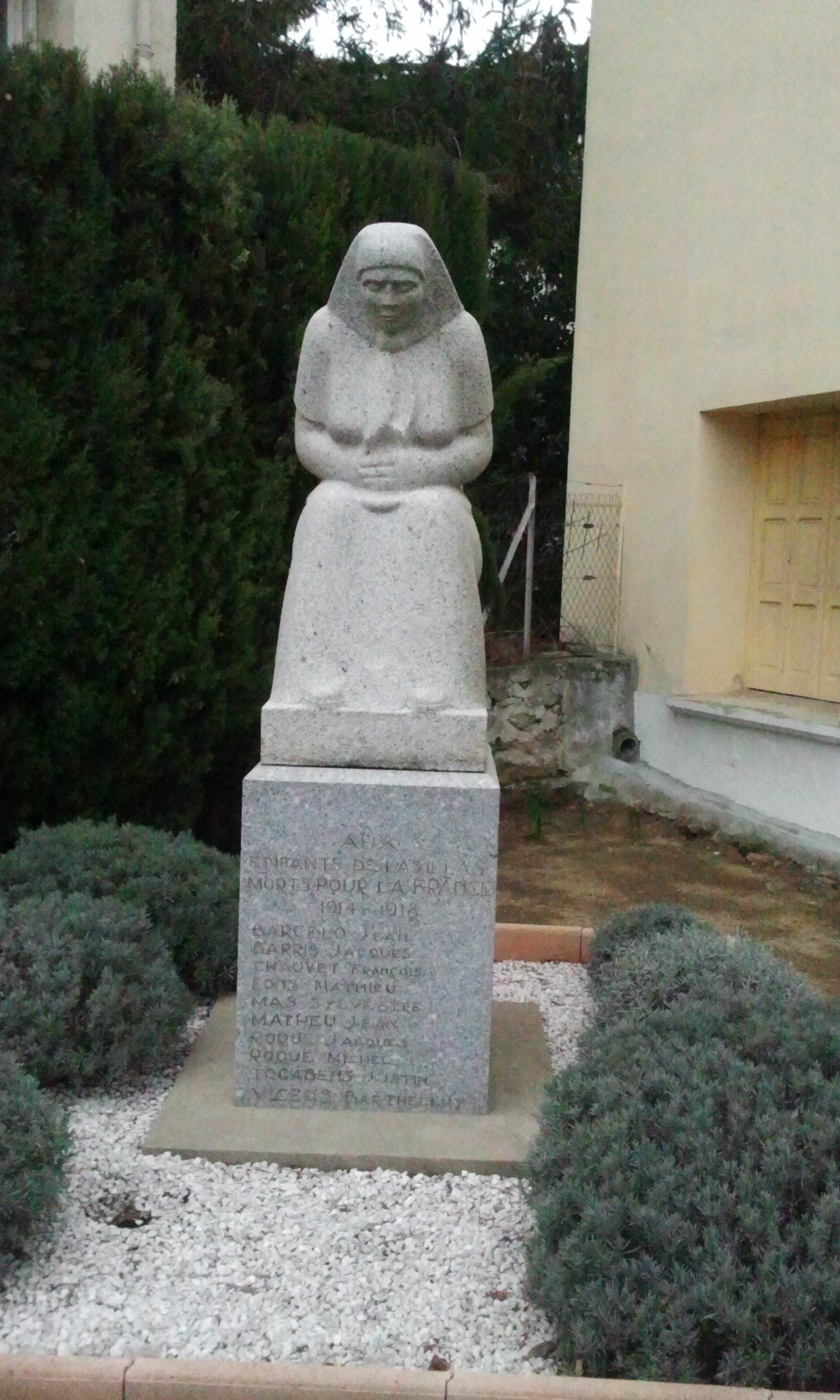
The war memorial

== See also ==
- Communes of the Pyrénées-Orientales department
