= Hiking in the Pyrénées-Orientales =

Hiking in the Pyrénées-Orientales is very popular because of its wide range of hiking tracks and scenery in the Pyrenees mountain range by the Mediterranean Sea. They are Pyrénées-Orientales' premier venue, through areas of some of the best scenery in the country. The tracks are maintained to a high standard, making it easier for visitors to explore some of the most scenic parts of Pyrénées' backcountry.

== List of great hikes ==
- Canigou Range Tracks
- Capcir Highlands Tracks
- Carlit Lakes Journey
- Força Real Trail
- French Cerdagne Trail
- Puigmal Mountain Trail
- Vallespir Forest Track
- Vauban Heritage Tracks
- Vermilion Coast Tracks

== Major Trans-pyrenees crossing trails ==
- Crossing the Pyrenees though the more accessible GR 10 in France parallel to the GR 11 in Spain.
- The Haute Randonnée Pyrénéenne is a coast to coast route through the Pyrénées, that links the Atlantic to the Mediterranean. the HRP is on the ridge line, crossing alternately French and Spanish slopes.

== Gallery ==
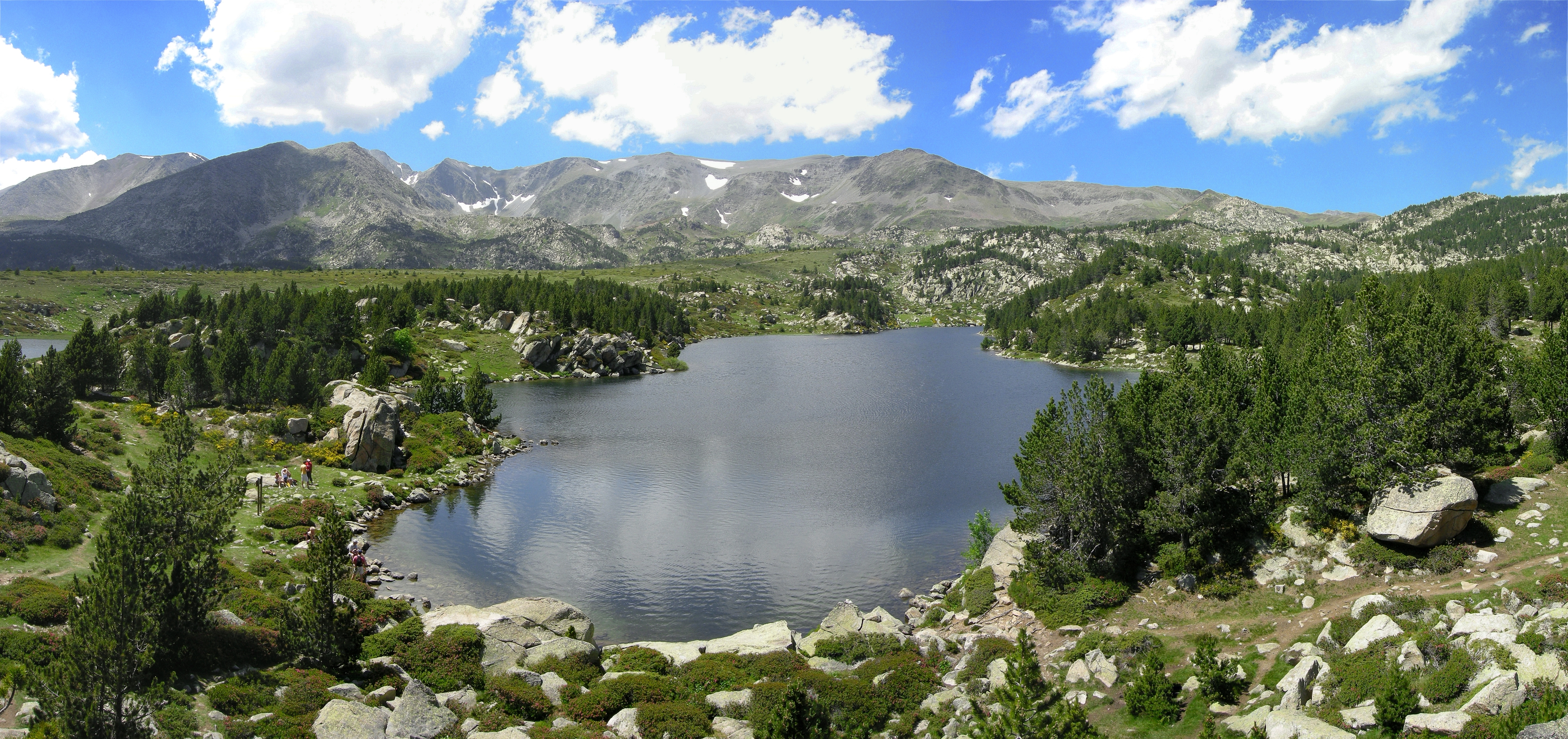

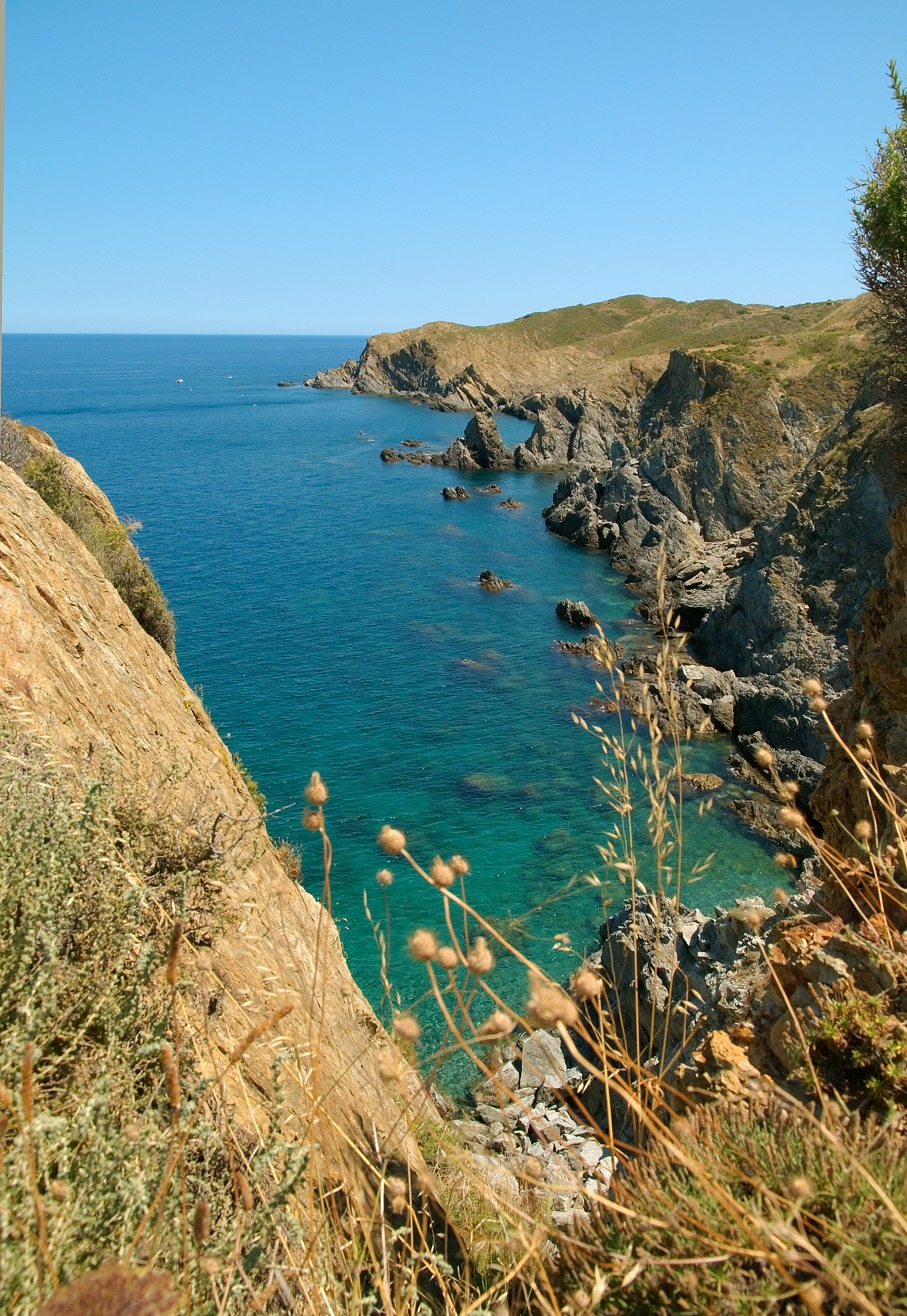

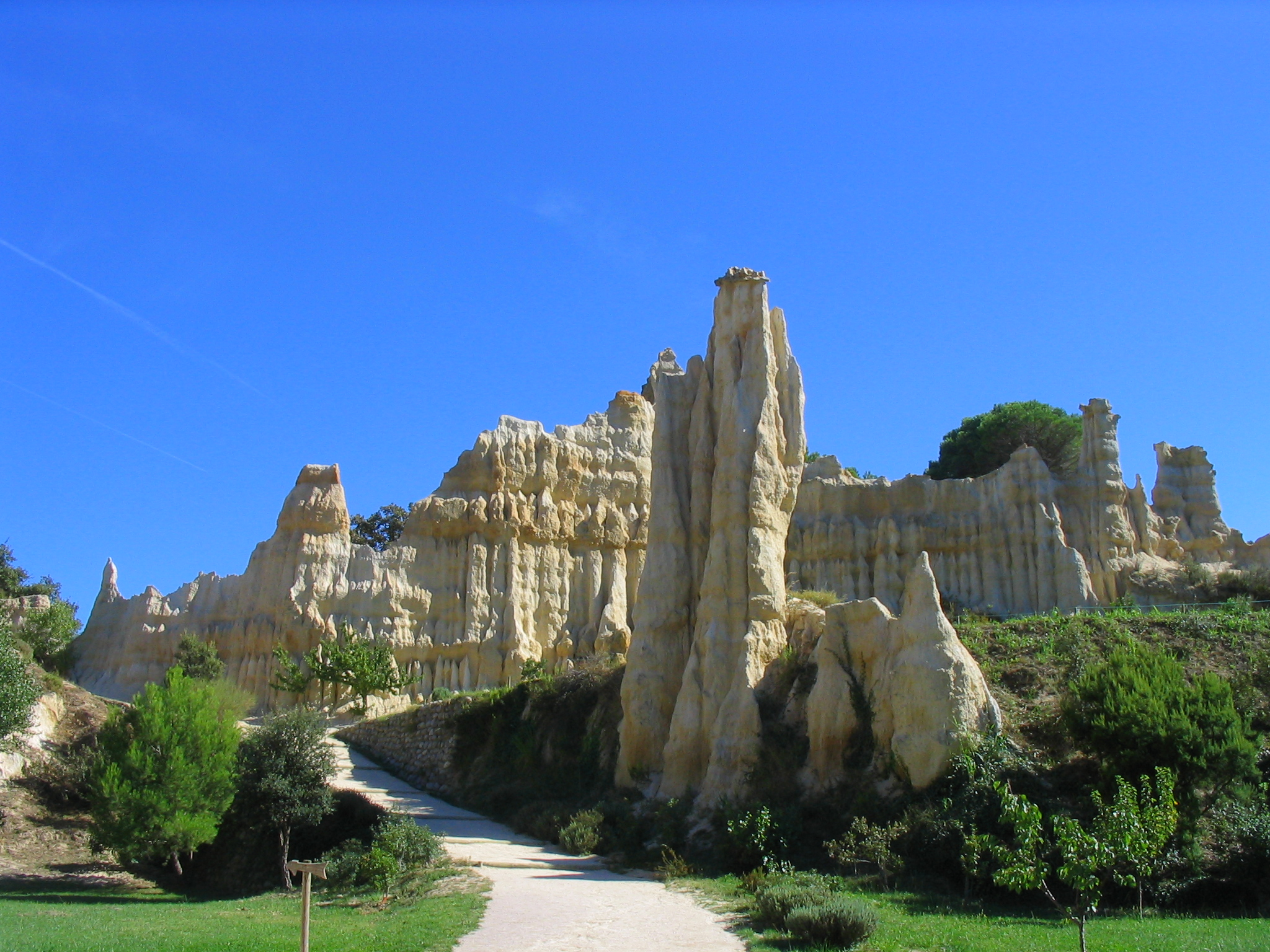

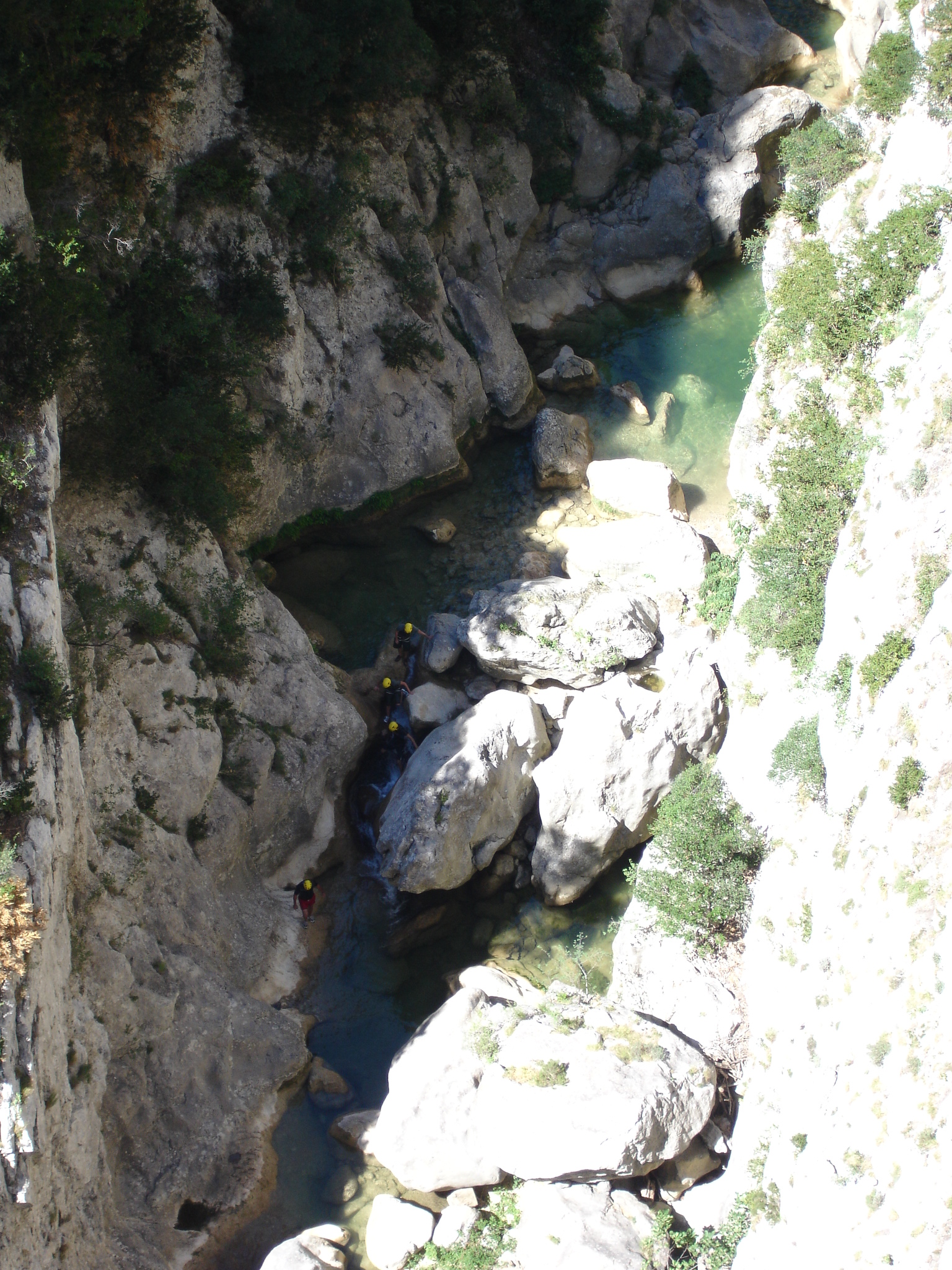

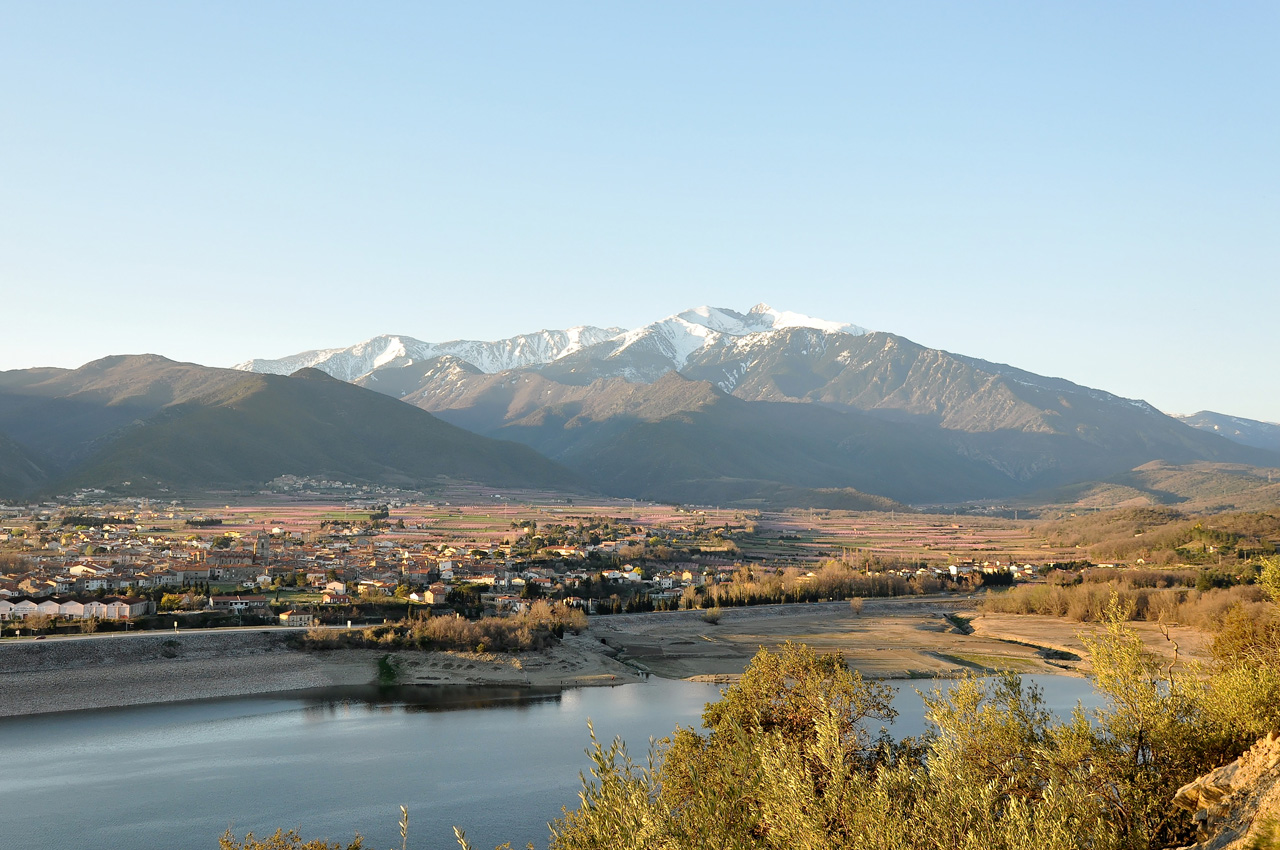

== See also ==
- Pyrénées-Orientales
- Trail blazing
