= Réserve Naturelle Marine de Cerbère-Banyuls =

Marine protected area of France

Réserve Naturelle Marine de Cerbère-Banyuls (Cerbère-Banyuls Marine Nature Reserve) is a marine protected area established in 1974 off the coast of Côte Vermeille, France, in the Mediterranean Sea. It is popular with underwater divers. It is a no-take zone intended to preserve biodiversity and fish populations.
