= Cerbère =

Cerbère Cervera de la Marenda
- Commune
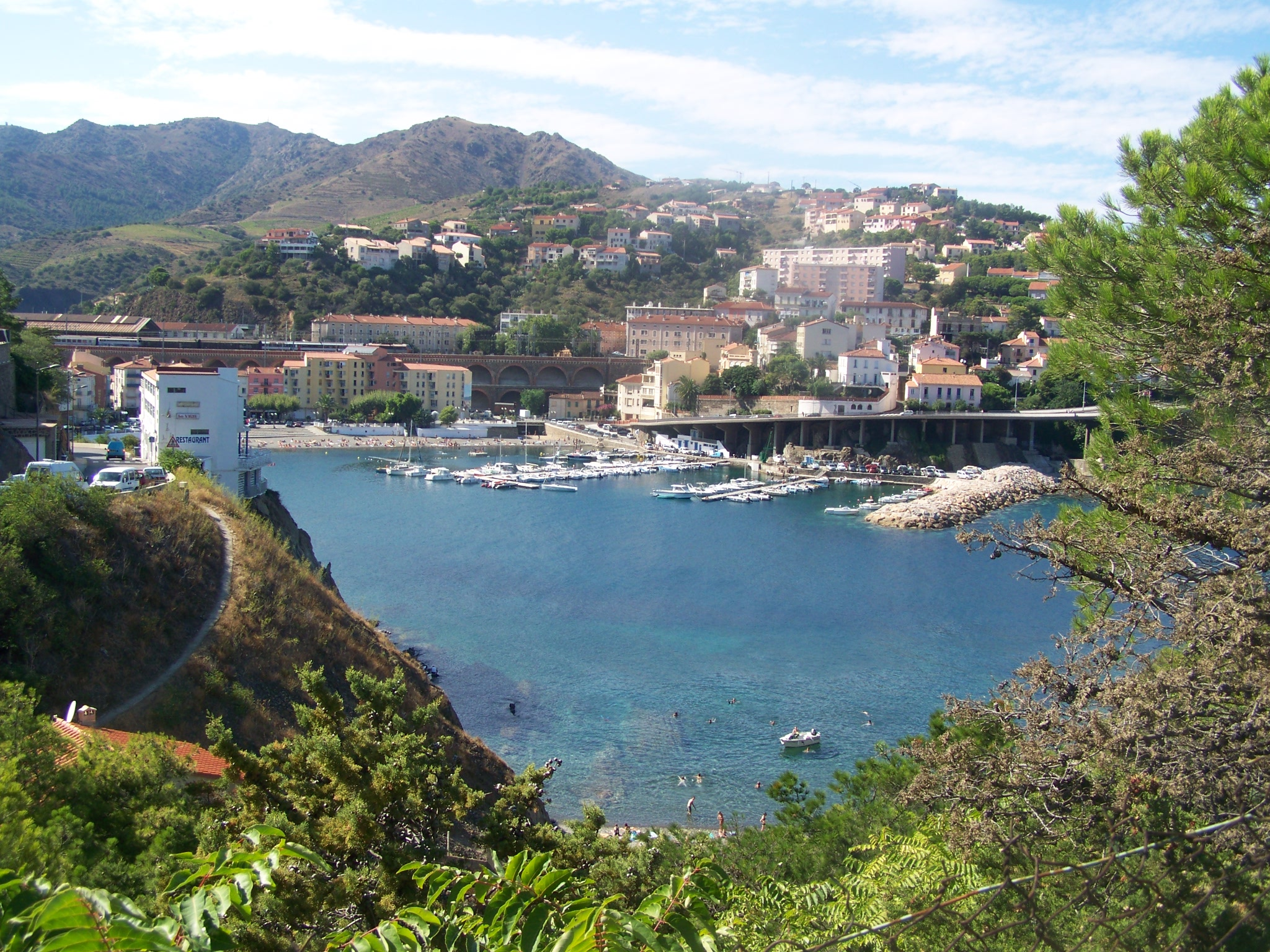
- A view of the harbor in Cerbère.

- Coat of arms
- Location of Cerbère
- Location within France Location within Occitanie
- Coordinates: 42°26′39″N 3°09′56″E
- Country: France
- Region: Occitania
- Department: Pyrénées-Orientales
- Arrondissement: Céret
- Canton: La Côte Vermeille
- Intercommunality: CC des Albères, de la Côte Vermeille et de l'Illibéris

Government
  - Mayor (2020–2026): Christian Grau
- Area^{1}: 8.18 km^{2} (3.16 sq mi)
- Highest elevation: 643 m (2,110 ft)
- Lowest elevation: 0 m (0 ft)
- Population (2023): 1,209
  - Density: 148/km^{2} (383/sq mi)
- Time zone: UTC+01:00 (CET)
  - Summer (DST): UTC+02:00 (CEST)
- INSEE/Postal code: 66048 /66290
- ^{1} French Land Register data, which excludes lakes, ponds, glaciers > 1 km^{2} (0.386 sq mi or 247 acres) and river estuaries.

Cerbère (French pronunciation: [sɛʁbɛʁ]; Catalan: Cervera de la Marenda; Occitan: Cerbèr) is a commune and railway town in the Pyrénées-Orientales department in southern France. Its inhabitants are called Cerbériens (Cerverins / Cerverines in Catalan).

The village is best known for the border railway station, Gare de Cerbère, on the French side of the border on the railway line between Perpignan and Barcelona. Since France and Spain use different rail gauges, the border stations of Cerbère and Portbou are quite busy with various transfer or gauge adjustment operations.

== Geography ==
=== Localisation ===
The last commune on the Côte Vermeille (vermilion coast) before Spain, Cerbère is neighboured by the communes of Banyuls-sur-Mer and Portbou (Spain).

Cerbère's proximity to Spain played a significant role in what has become known as "The Retreat" or "La Retirada". In the early months of 1939, many of the near 500,000 Republican refugees fleeing Franco's Spain flooded over the border at Col-des-Balistras/Belitres Pass into Cerbère and other border villages. A monument featuring an exposition of photos taken by photographer Manuel Moros of those refugees now marks the crest of Belitres Pass, where Portbou in Spain and Cerbère in France can be seen from the same spot.

Cerbère is located in the canton of La Côte Vermeille and in the arrondissement of Céret.

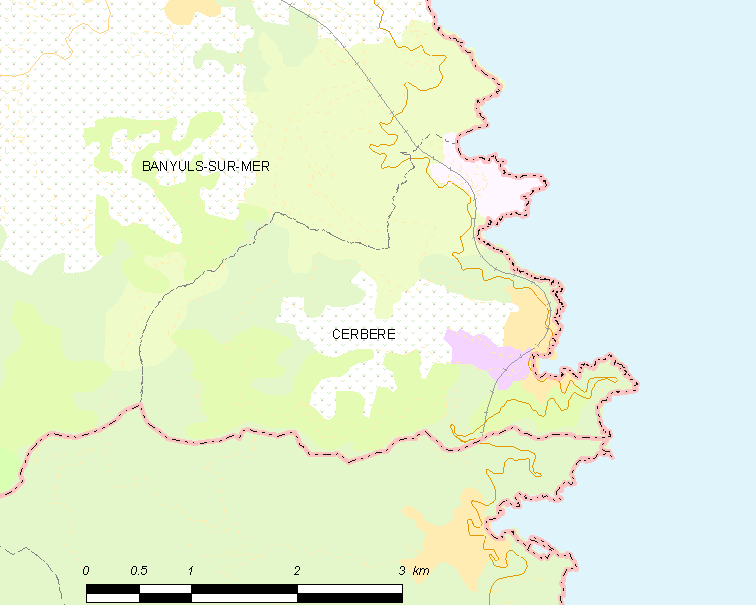
Map of Cerbère and its surrounding communes

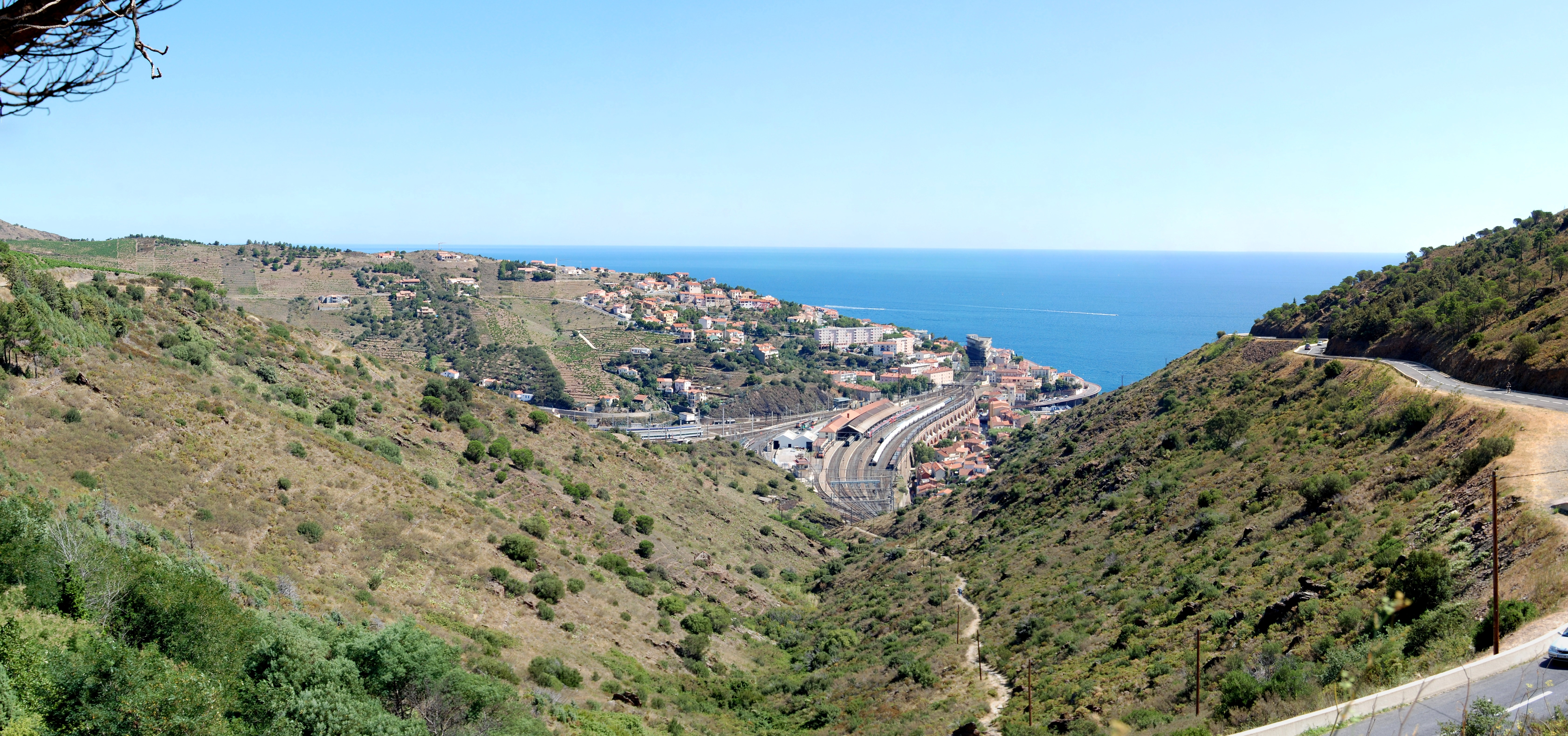
Panorama of Cerbère seen from the French/Spanish border

== Toponymy ==
The derivation of the name has nothing to do with the dog Cerberus (Cerbère in French), guardian of Hell in Greek mythology, even if Cape Cerbère could appear as a guard post at the entry to Spain. In any case, numerous other localities have the same name, especially in Spain, and their geographic position would not suggest such a derivation. An alternative suggestion is a place frequented by stags (French: cerfs), an equally unlikely hypothesis. Given the antiquity of the name, it must be assumed to be a pre-Latin name, and to come from the pre-Indo-European root kar or ker (rock) followed by the Ibero-Basque root -erri (place). The name of Cerbère described, then, a rocky place, which perfectly describes the site, as well as other localities with similar names.

== History ==
Prehistoric occupation is beyond doubt, as witnessed by the presence of several megaliths within the commune: two menhirs, one at the foot of Pic de Querroig (Catalan: la Pera Dreta), and three dolmens: at Col de la Farella, Col des Portes and at Coma Estepera.

Cerbère is mentioned from the first century by the earliest Roman geographer Pomponius Mela, as marking the limit of the Gauls: Cervaria locus finis galliae; this is reflected in 1659 in the negotiations to fix the Franco-Spanish border. In 1155, the area was known as Cervera.

Although the commune of Cerbère only dates from 1889, its territory was already defined in document of 981, in the form of a fiefdom granted by the French King Lothaire to his friend the Duke Gausfred. In this document are set out the present limits of the territory: Perafita, Pic Joan and Pic de Querroig. This fiefdom, called la vall de Cervera, included a castle (the Querroig tower is the only remnant) and a church dedicated to Christ the Saviour, built at the foot of the Pic de Querroig and mentioned in the 14th century. It is only from the fourteenth century that we can find evidence to give a vague idea of the history of Cerbère. The place was attached to Abeilles, creating a single seigneurie (manor), of which Dominique Isern, from Rigarda, was owner at the end of the Ancien Régime. It then became part of the commune of Banyuls-sur-Mer, to which it had, in fact, been more or less attached since the Middle Ages.

It was in 1864 that the destiny of Cerbère was to change. In this year, an agreement was signed between Spain and France to build a rail link between the two countries, leading to the construction of two frontier stations at Portbou and at Cerbère. The international tunnel was inaugurated in 1876, the tracks laid and the international station opened in 1878. Traffic was immediately important, and led to a rapid growth of population. The rail infrastructure grew to a considerable size, since the differing track gauges in Spain and France necessitated moving all merchandise between trains - simpler than changing the axles. The growth in population led naturally to the creation of the commune of Cerbère (1889), which had 1428 inhabitants in the census of 1891. The population did not stop growing until 1962, when it reached 2438. Growth was reversed from this date for several reasons: mechanisation on the railway (notably the changing of axles), growth of road transport, and abolition of Customs barriers. However, the economic role of Cerbère is far from being negligible: in 1998, the station handled a total of 2,500,000 tonnes of merchandise. In the freight yard, 350 to 700 wagons are handled daily, whether by changing axles (13 trains a day) or with dual axles (10 trains a day). For passengers, the number of trains serving the station varies from 18 to 47 a day depending on season. Annually, 15,000 trains pass through Cerbère station.

In the 20th century Cerbère was the site of a camp housing Republican escapees from Spain at the end of the Spanish Civil War.

== Politics and administration ==
=== Mayors ===
Mayor	Term start	Term end
Dominique Mitjavile	1888	1896
Sauveur Sayrou	1896	1902
Jean-Félix Belloc	1902	1904
Gabriel Coll	1956	1959
Joseph Estève	1959	1965
Jean Marti	1965	1995
Jean-Claude Portella	1995	2020
Christian Grau	2020	incumbent

== Population ==
Historical population
Year	Pop.	±% p.a.
1968	2,064	—
1975	1,940	−0.88%
1982	1,641	−2.36%
1990	1,461	−1.44%
1999	1,487	+0.20%
2007	1,571	+0.69%
2012	1,370	−2.70%
2017	1,355	−0.22%
2023	1,209	−1.88%
Source: INSEE

== Sites of interest ==
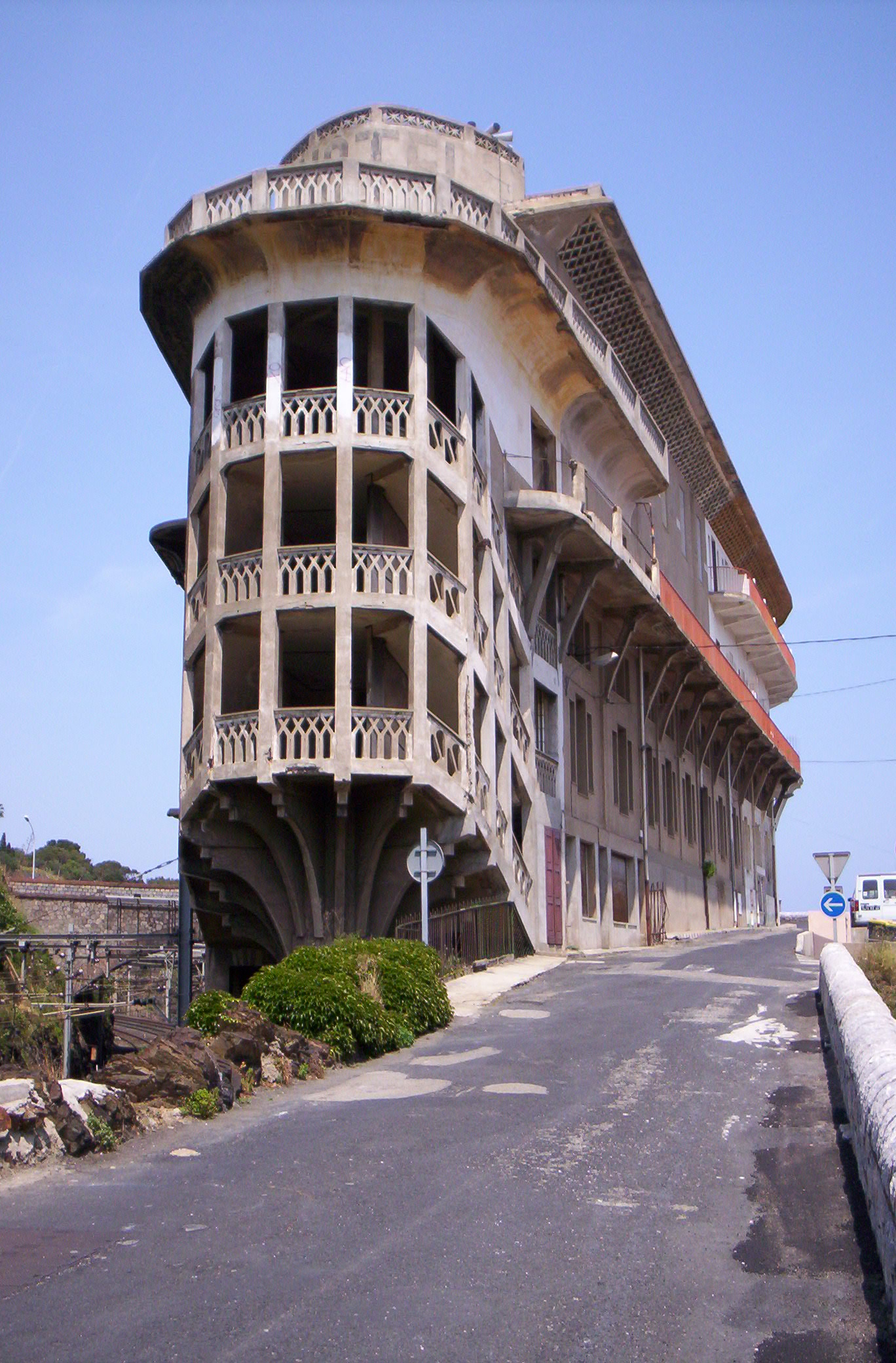
Léon Baille's Hotel Belvédère du Rayon Vert

- The former Belvédère du Rayon Vert hotel, designed in the art déco style by the Perpignan architect, Léon Baille, was built between 1928 and 1932 and has the overall appearance of a ship. It has its own cinema and a tennis court on the roof. In 1987, the building was added to the list of historic monuments.
- Cap Cerbère is a rocky headland giving excellent views of the Catalan coast.
- The road over the Franco-Spanish border, while very tortuous, affords splendid views of the town as well as the coast. The actual border is on the Col des Balistres at 173 m/568 ft.
- Cerbère is an important centre for tourism, often linked with undersea diving. The Cerbère-Banyuls National Nature Reserve established in 1974, was the first marine reserve in France and covers 650 hectares (1,600 acres) of sea.

== See also ==
- Communes of the Pyrénées-Orientales department
