= Port-Vendres =

- Commune
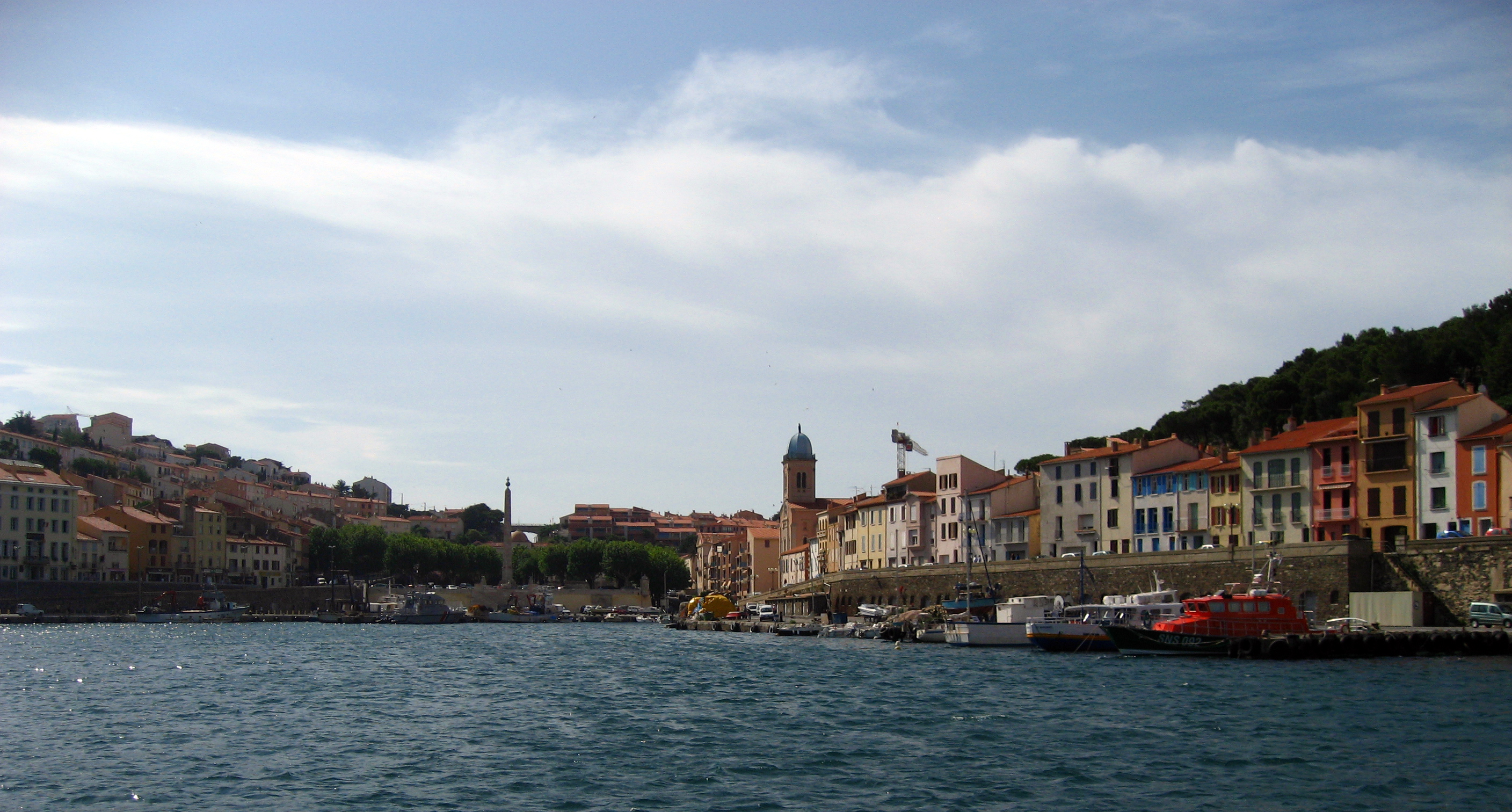
- The harbour of Port-Vendres

- Coat of arms
- Location of Port-Vendres
- Location within France Location within Occitanie
- Coordinates: 42°31′08″N 3°06′21″E
- Country: France
- Region: Occitania
- Department: Pyrénées-Orientales
- Arrondissement: Céret
- Canton: La Côte Vermeille

Government
  - Mayor (2020–2026): Grégory Marty
- Area^{1}: 14.77 km^{2} (5.70 sq mi)
- Elevation: 23 m (75 ft)
- Highest elevation: 655 m (2,149 ft)
- Lowest elevation: 0 m (0 ft)
- Population (2023): 4,018
  - Density: 272.0/km^{2} (704.6/sq mi)
- Time zone: UTC+01:00 (CET)
  - Summer (DST): UTC+02:00 (CEST)
- INSEE/Postal code: 66148 /66660
- ^{1} French Land Register data, which excludes lakes, ponds, glaciers > 1 km^{2} (0.386 sq mi or 247 acres) and river estuaries.

Port-Vendres (French pronunciation: [pɔʁ vɑ̃dʁ]; Catalan: Portvendres) is a commune in the Pyrénées-Orientales department, southeastern France.

A typical Mediterranean fishing port, situated near the Spanish border on the Côte Vermeille in southeastern France, Port-Vendres is renowned for its numerous fish and sea food restaurants.

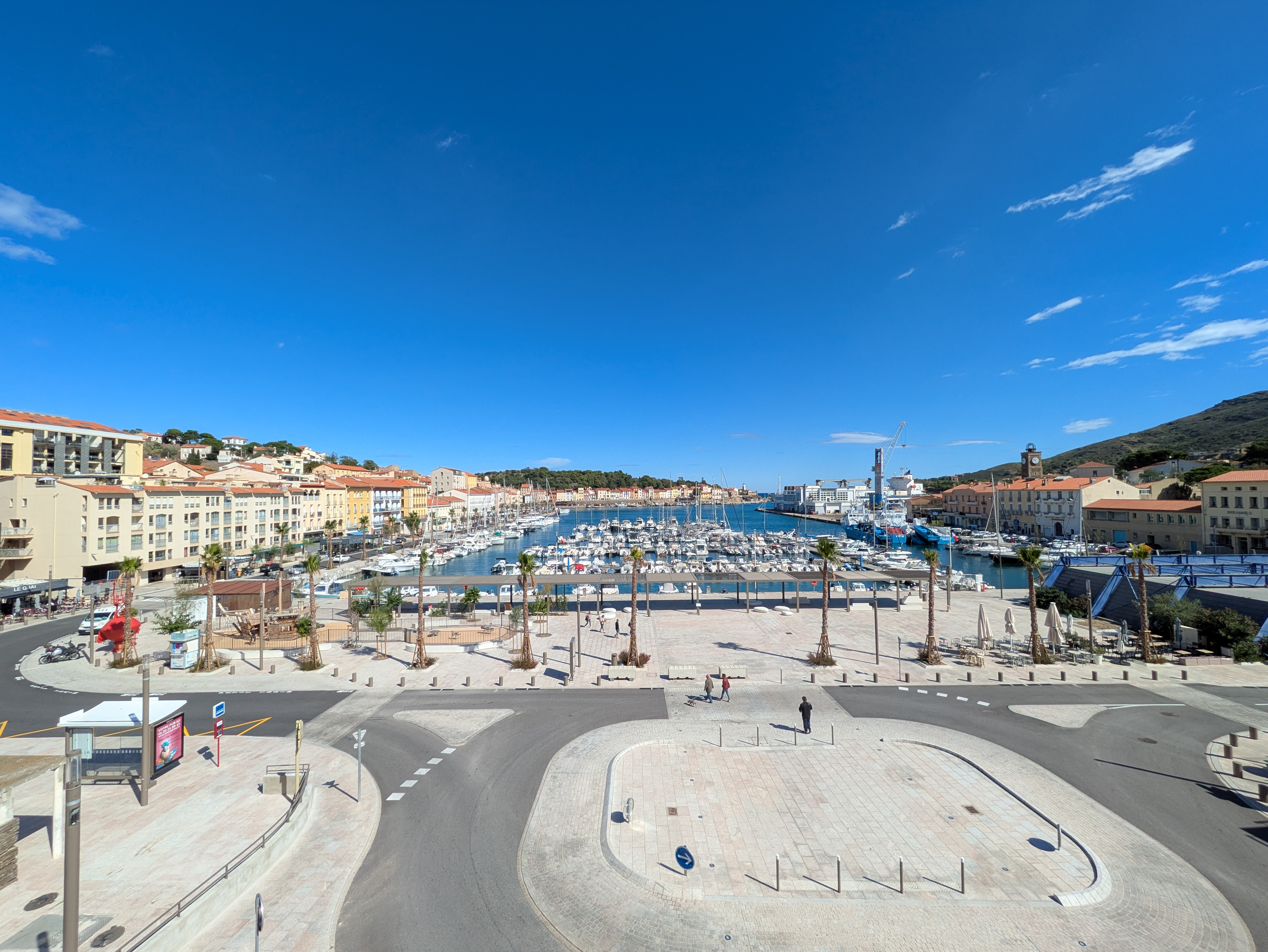
The port and the Quai François Joly, in the centre de Port-Vendres. The quay was renovated in 2025.

== Geography ==
Port-Vendres is located in the canton of La Côte Vermeille and in the arrondissement of Céret.

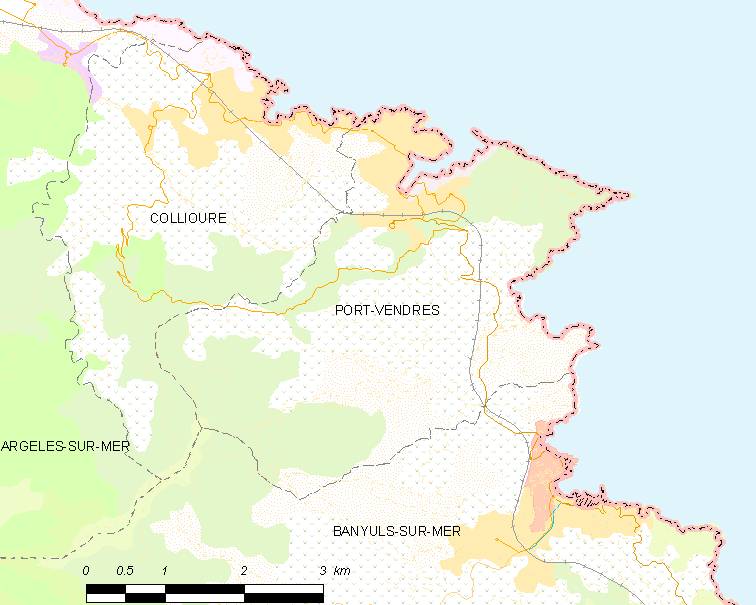
Map of Port-Vendres and its surrounding communes

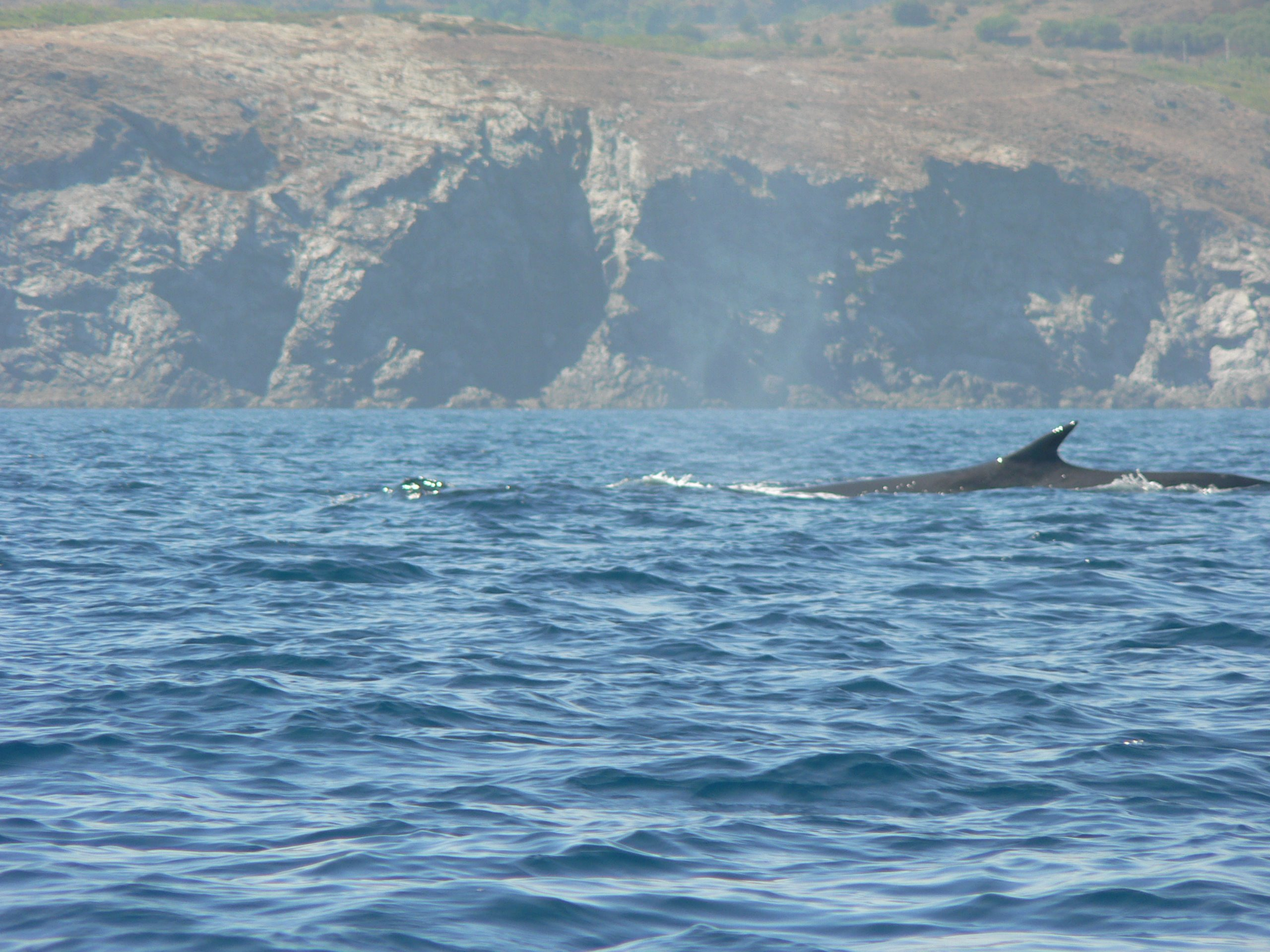
Fin whale swimming nearby cap Béar

Port-Vendres is one of the few deep-water ports in this part of the French Mediterranean coast. It takes freighters and cruise ships, as well as large and small fishing boats which may be seen arriving with their daily catch.

The geomorphology of Port-Vendres meant that it developed in a different way from the nearby port of Collioure. Whereas Collioure has two beaches which slowly descend into a relatively shallow sandy-bottomed harbour, Port-Vendres is deeper and rockier. Collioure and Port-Vendres have therefore been used for different purposes - Collioure for small commercial ship and Port-Vendres for larger vessels and military transports. During the 20th century, this made it a main point of embarkation for French troops going to serve in Algeria.

Port-Vendres, view to the north-west.

=== Climate ===
Climate data for Port-Vendres (normals 1991–2020, extremes 1973-present)
Month	Jan	Feb	Mar	Apr	May	Jun	Jul	Aug	Sep	Oct	Nov	Dec	Year
Record high °C (°F)	22.2 (72.0)	22.3 (72.1)	24.8 (76.6)	27.7 (81.9)	32.2 (90.0)	36.4 (97.5)	34.5 (94.1)	36.3 (97.3)	32.4 (90.3)	31.0 (87.8)	23.8 (74.8)	23.0 (73.4)	36.4 (97.5)
Mean daily maximum °C (°F)	12.2 (54.0)	12.5 (54.5)	14.8 (58.6)	17.0 (62.6)	20.3 (68.5)	24.4 (75.9)	27.0 (80.6)	27.0 (80.6)	23.6 (74.5)	19.9 (67.8)	15.7 (60.3)	13.1 (55.6)	18.9 (66.0)
Daily mean °C (°F)	9.7 (49.5)	9.8 (49.6)	12.1 (53.8)	14.2 (57.6)	17.5 (63.5)	21.3 (70.3)	23.9 (75.0)	23.9 (75.0)	20.8 (69.4)	17.4 (63.3)	13.3 (55.9)	10.7 (51.3)	16.2 (61.2)
Mean daily minimum °C (°F)	7.2 (45.0)	7.1 (44.8)	9.3 (48.7)	11.2 (52.2)	14.5 (58.1)	18.2 (64.8)	20.7 (69.3)	20.8 (69.4)	17.8 (64.0)	14.7 (58.5)	10.7 (51.3)	8.1 (46.6)	13.4 (56.1)
Record low °C (°F)	−7.0 (19.4)	−3.1 (26.4)	−1.6 (29.1)	2.0 (35.6)	4.8 (40.6)	9.0 (48.2)	12.2 (54.0)	14.0 (57.2)	9.1 (48.4)	5.2 (41.4)	−0.5 (31.1)	−5.9 (21.4)	−7.0 (19.4)
Average precipitation mm (inches)	51.9 (2.04)	45.1 (1.78)	50.6 (1.99)	53.9 (2.12)	48.5 (1.91)	33.3 (1.31)	13.0 (0.51)	22.0 (0.87)	51.7 (2.04)	90.8 (3.57)	71.2 (2.80)	41.1 (1.62)	573.2 (22.57)
Average precipitation days (≥ 1 mm)	8.4	9.7	7.7	7.5	7.6	9.7	5.4	7.3	11.2	13.3	11.0	7.4	106.2
Source: Infoclimat.fr

== History ==
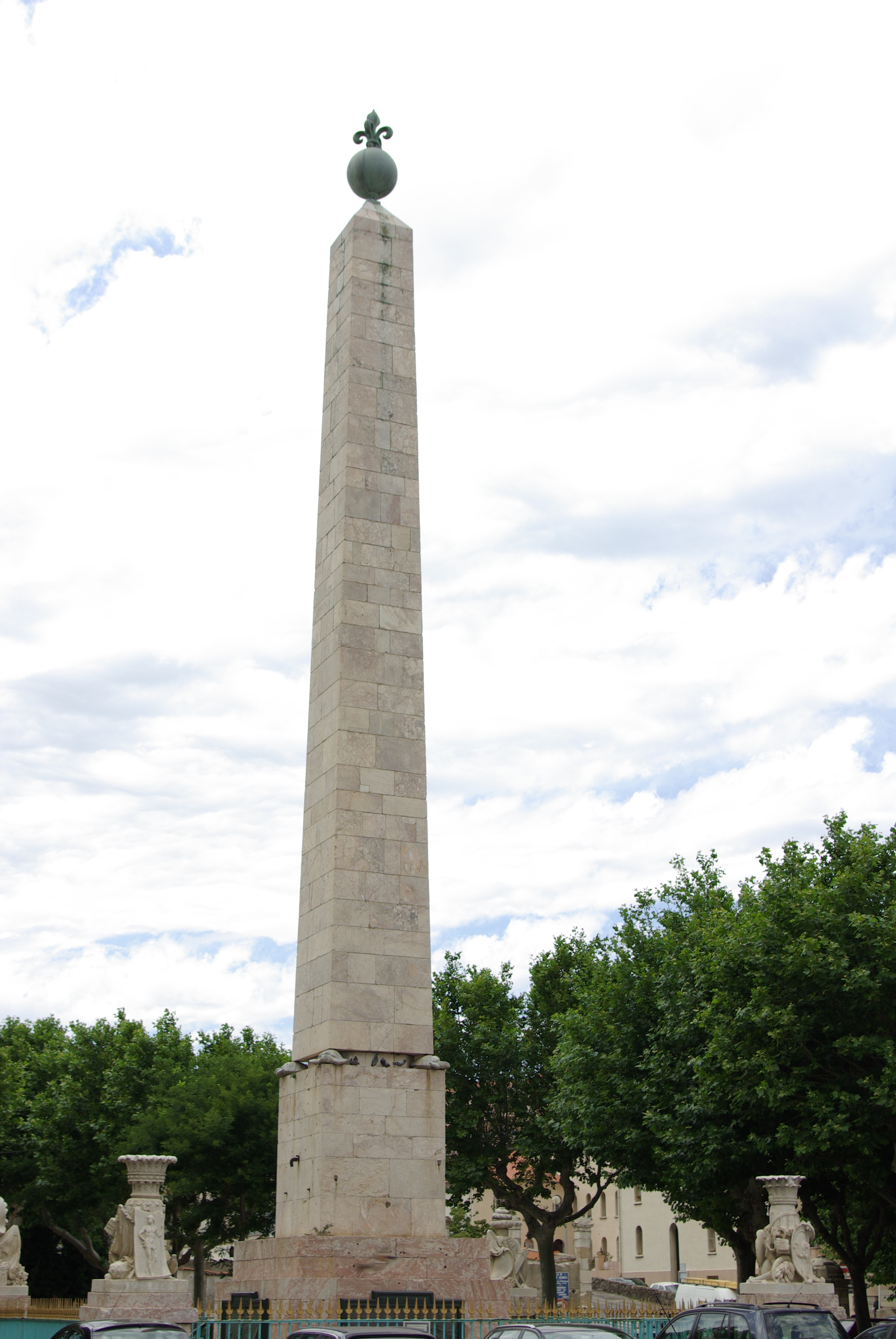
Obelisk of Port-Vendres

Port-Vendres has been in existence since Iron Age times, when it was used as a harbour connected with the Iberian settlement of Illiberis (modern Elne). It was later developed by the Romans, who called it Portus Veneris after the goddess Venus; there was probably a temple of Venus nearby for the good fortune of mariners. Ancient writers wrote that there was a sanctuary of Aphrodite and called it Aphrodisium (Ancient Greek: Ἀφροδίσιον). Strabo writes that it was dedicated to the Pyrenaean Aphrodite (Ancient Greek: Πυρηναίας Ἀφροδίτης).

During the Middle Ages, Port-Vendres was expanded by the rulers of the Kingdom of Majorca and served as a key point of connection between the mainland and the Balearic Islands. It passed to France along with the rest of Roussillon in 1659, as a result of the Treaty of the Pyrenees. Vauban carried out work to fortify the port between 1673 and 1700, building three redoubts and fortresses.

Under Louis XVI, a major expansion of the port was carried out under the supervision of Count Joseph Augustin De Mailly d'Haucourt, the lieutenant general for Roussillon and commander in chief of the province. He was the driving force behind the modernisation of Port-Vendres as a port, and followed plans originally conceived by Vauban to open up and enlarge the existing facilities. From 1776 to 1778, land was dug out and quays were created. A fourth fortress, the Redoute Mailly, was also built at this time to guard the harbour.

Charles De Wailly, architect and painter to the king, was commissioned to build a 98 feet (30 m)-high marble obelisk which has now become a focal point of Port-Vendres. The first stone was placed on 28 September 1780, by Mailly's wife, Felicite de Narbonne Pelet, and witnessed by much of the Roussillon nobility. The obelisk is adorned by four bronze bas-reliefs representing the newly independent United States of America, which France had supported during the American War of Independence; the abolition of serfdom in France; free trade and the strengthened French Navy. In commemoration of the building of the obelisk, the Fete de Mailly takes place every September. The day begins with a fancy dress parade through the streets followed by a re-enactment of the placing of the first stone, circus workshops, historical games, rides in a carriage, Xim Xim concert (featuring traditional dance music of central France), Catalan ballet, enactment of a pirate fight, jeu de foulard (bandana game), and so on.

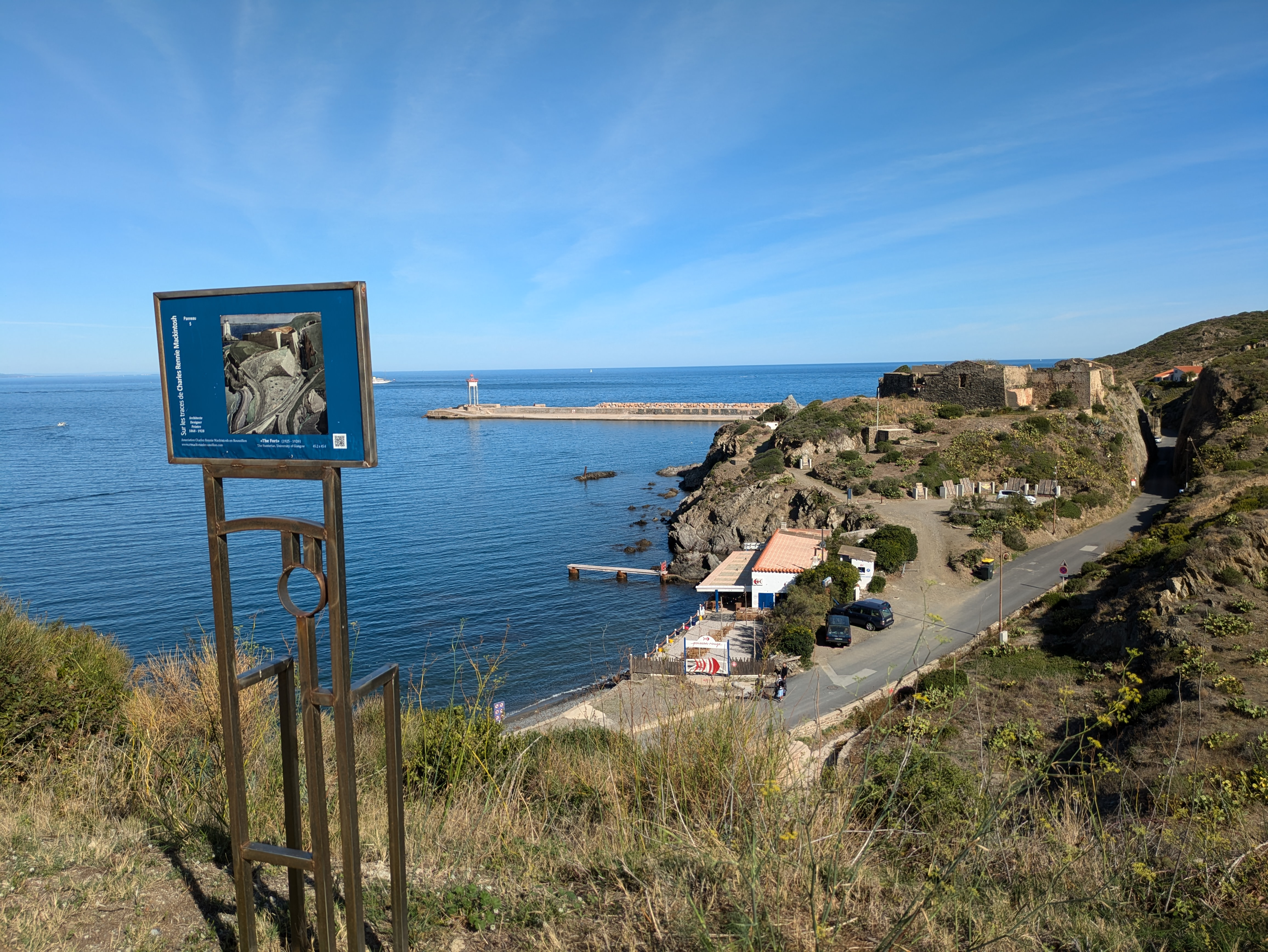
On the "Charles Rennie Mackintosh Trail" in Port-Vendres.

The Scottish Art Nouveau architect, interior designer, textile designer and water colourist Charles Rennie Mackintosh lived and painted in Port-Vendres from 1923 until 1927, when he was forced by ill health to return to London, where he died in 1928. During his stay in Port-Vendres Mackintosh painted many watercolours of the town and the surrounding area.

During the Second World War, the town was part of a heavily fortified coastal zone established by the occupying forces of Nazi Germany. Coastal artillery batteries were built at Cap Béar just south of the town, but the Germans abandoned the area in August 1944 a few days after the Allied landings on the Côte d'Azur during Operation Dragoon.

== Politics and administration ==
=== Mayors ===
Mayor	Term start	Term end
Michel Strehaiano	?	2008
Jean-Pierre Romero	2008	

=== Twin towns ===
Port-Vendres is twinned with:

- Yorktown, Virginia, United States
- Zweibrücken, Germany

== Population ==
Historical population
Year	Pop.	±% p.a.
1968	5,705	—
1975	5,613	−0.23%
1982	5,246	−0.96%
1990	5,370	+0.29%
1999	5,881	+1.02%
2007	4,414	−3.52%
2012	4,227	−0.86%
2017	4,129	−0.47%
2023	4,018	−0.45%
Source: INSEE

== See also ==
- Banyuls AOC
- Paulilles
- Communes of the Pyrénées-Orientales department
