= Côte Vermeille =

Region in the French department of Pyrénées-Orientales

Coordinates: 42°30′N 3°08′E

The Côte Vermeille (French pronunciation: [kot vɛʁmɛj]; Catalan: Costa Vermella, meaning "vermilion coast", or traditionally Catalan: la Marenda; Occitan: Còsta Vermelha) is a region in the French department of Pyrénées-Orientales on the Mediterranean Coast near the border with Spain. The Côte Vermeille stretches from Argelès-sur-Mer to the border village of Cerbère. The towns of Collioure, Port-Vendres and Banyuls-sur-Mer are nested along a 20 km stretch of beaches, small bays, creeks and coves.

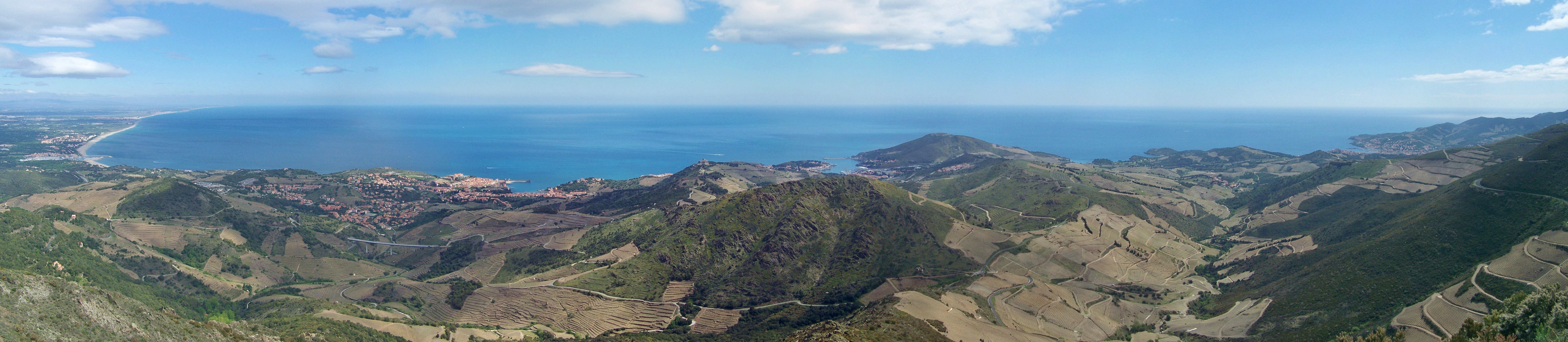
The Côte Vermeille, showing Argelès-sur-Mer, Collioure, Port-Vendres, Paulilles and Banyuls-sur-Mer.

== See also ==
- Paulilles
- Natura 2000
- Route départementale 914
