= Coll de la Llosa dolmen =

Megalithic tomb in Occitania, France

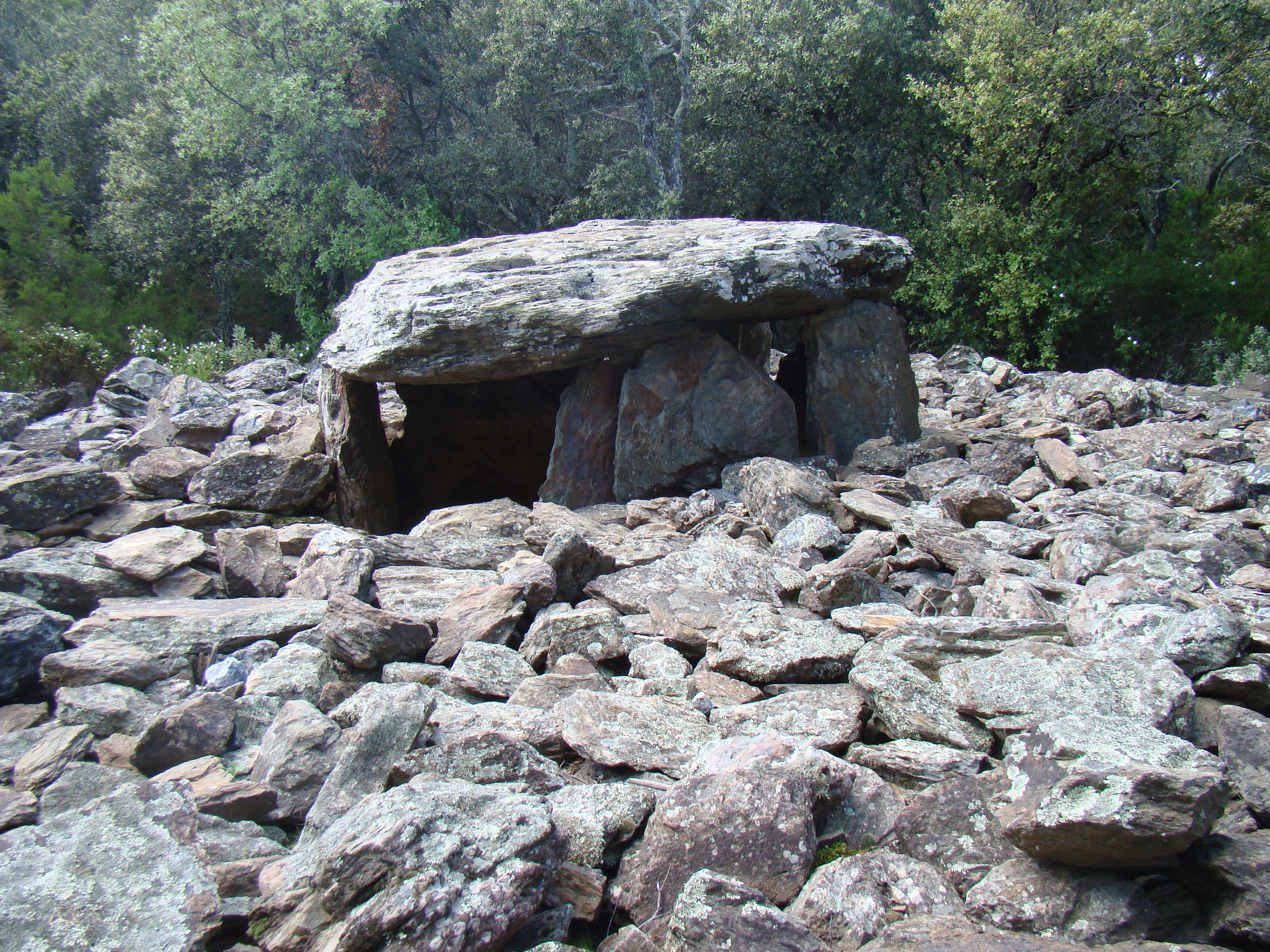
- The dolmen in 2016
- Interactive map of Coll de la Llosa dolmen
- 42°37′50″N 2°36′21″E
- Type: Dolmen
- Location: Pyrénées-Orientales, Occitania, France

History
- Built: c. 3500 BC

Site notes
- Material: Schist

The Coll de la Llosa dolmen is a megalithic structure located on the border of the communes of Bouleternère, Casefabre, and Saint-Michel-de-Llotes in the French department of Pyrénées-Orientales in the Occitanie region.

The corridor dolmen is surrounded by a tumulus measuring ten meters in diameter, and is covered with a slab bearing numerous engravings in the form of crosses and cup marks. Its function is probably that of a collective burial of the chamber or corridor type; it dates from the 4th millennium BC, which would link it to the Neolithic culture of the southern Chasséen, well identified in the Pyrénées-Orientales.

== Geography ==
The dolmen is located on a pass called Coll de la Llosa, at an altitude of 592 m, in the Aspres natural region in the eastern foothills of the Canigou massif, to the east of the Pyrenees mountain range. Like all the other dolmens in the region, the archaeological site is located on a high point overlooking the surrounding area. The Coll de la Llosa dolmen has the added distinction of dominating the deep valley of the Boulès river to the west, just above one of its springs.

Administratively, it is located in the French department of Pyrénées-Orientales, on the boundary of the communes of Bouleternère, Casefabre, and Saint-Michel-de-Llotes, having served as a milestone for the definition of the territories of these three villages. Its discoverer, Eugène Devaux, placed it in the territory of Casefabre, while Catalan researchers Carreras and Tarrús placed it in Saint-Michel-de-Llotes.

It can be reached on foot via a number of unmarked paths, as the megalith stands in the middle of a Mediterranean-type forest. The nearest road, a narrow départementale, runs several hundred meters to the east, and a forest track 200 m to the west. Several dolmens can be found nearby, including the dolmen of les Rieres (1.5 km to the north), the dolmen of la Creu de la Llosa, those located in the communes of Bouleternère and Saint-Michel-de-Llotes, and a cup mark that may be a dolmen remnant just 150 m away, on the same col.

The word coll means "col" in Catalan, the traditional language of the Aspres region. In the same language, a llosa is a large, flat rock. Various expressions of this type designating flat rocks actually refer to dolmens, which subsequently gave their name to the area surrounding them.

== Description ==
The Coll de la Llosa dolmen is a dolmen with a narrowed corridor: it consists of a trapezoidal dolmenic chamber extended by a corridor 2.50 m long and around 50 cm wide, crossing a circular mound around ten metres in diameter.

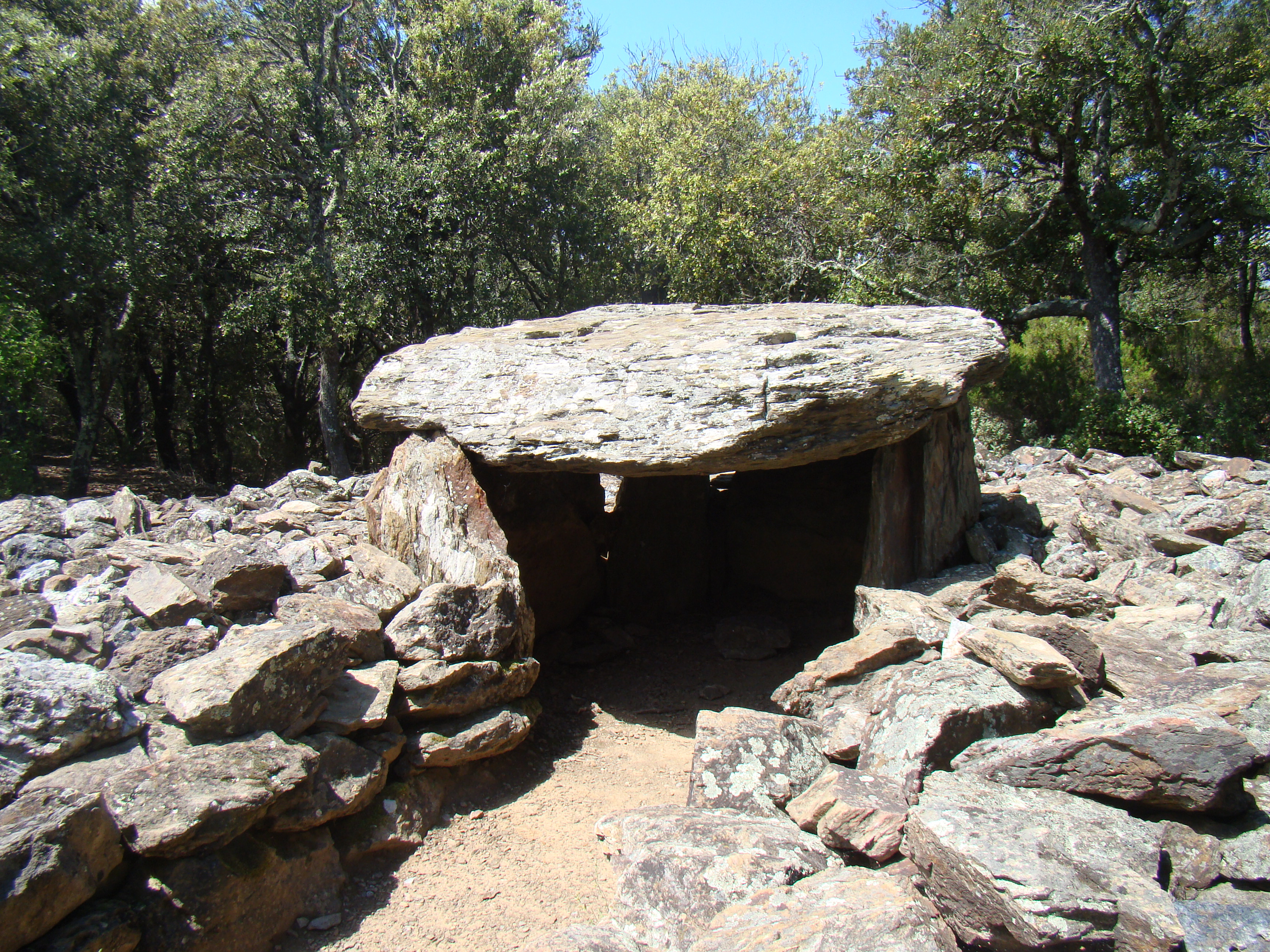
Corridor and dolmen

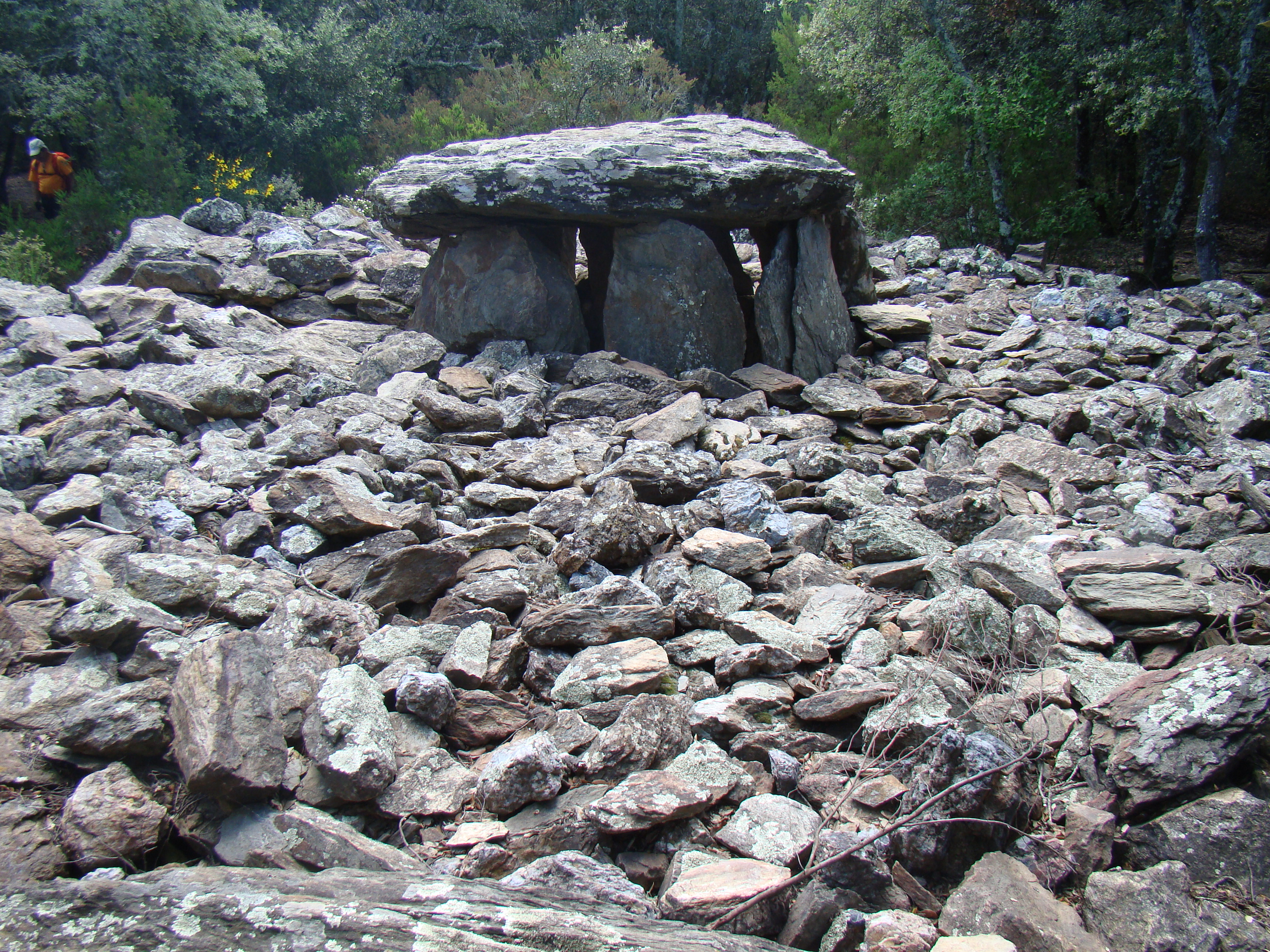
Tumulus

It is made of gneiss and schist blocks quarried on site. The axis of the dolmen is west-east, with an entrance to the east. It follows the natural movements of the ground: a west-east trough at the top of a mound, which facilitated construction by limiting the excavation of rocky ground and the supply of material for the tumulus,. The cover slab, made of schist, is wide and thick (length: 1.50 m, width: 2.40 m, average thickness: 35 cm). Only one of the chevet slabs appears to have retained its original position, the others having been tilted or moved long before the dolmen was restored.

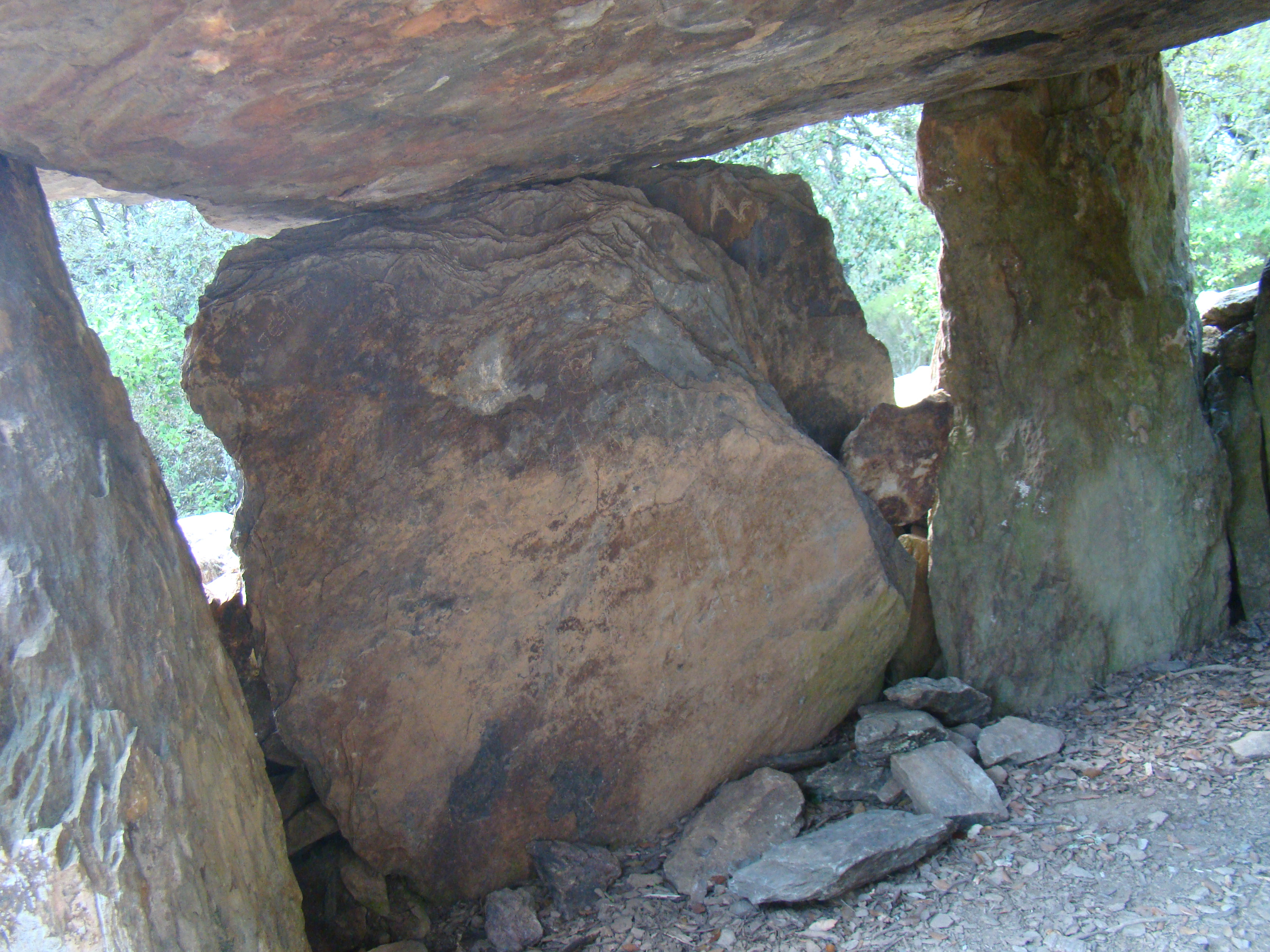
Inside the chamber, on the left

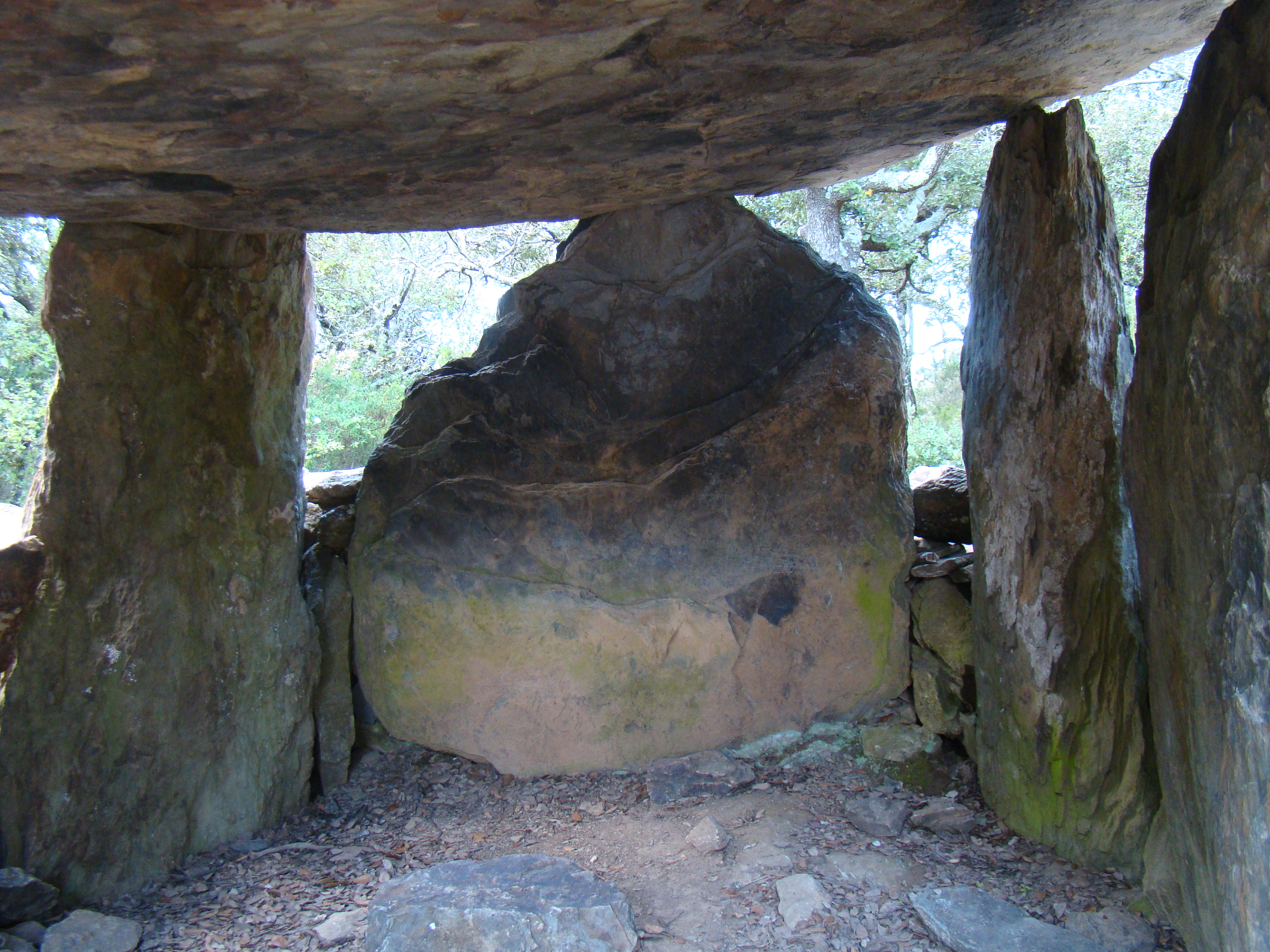
back

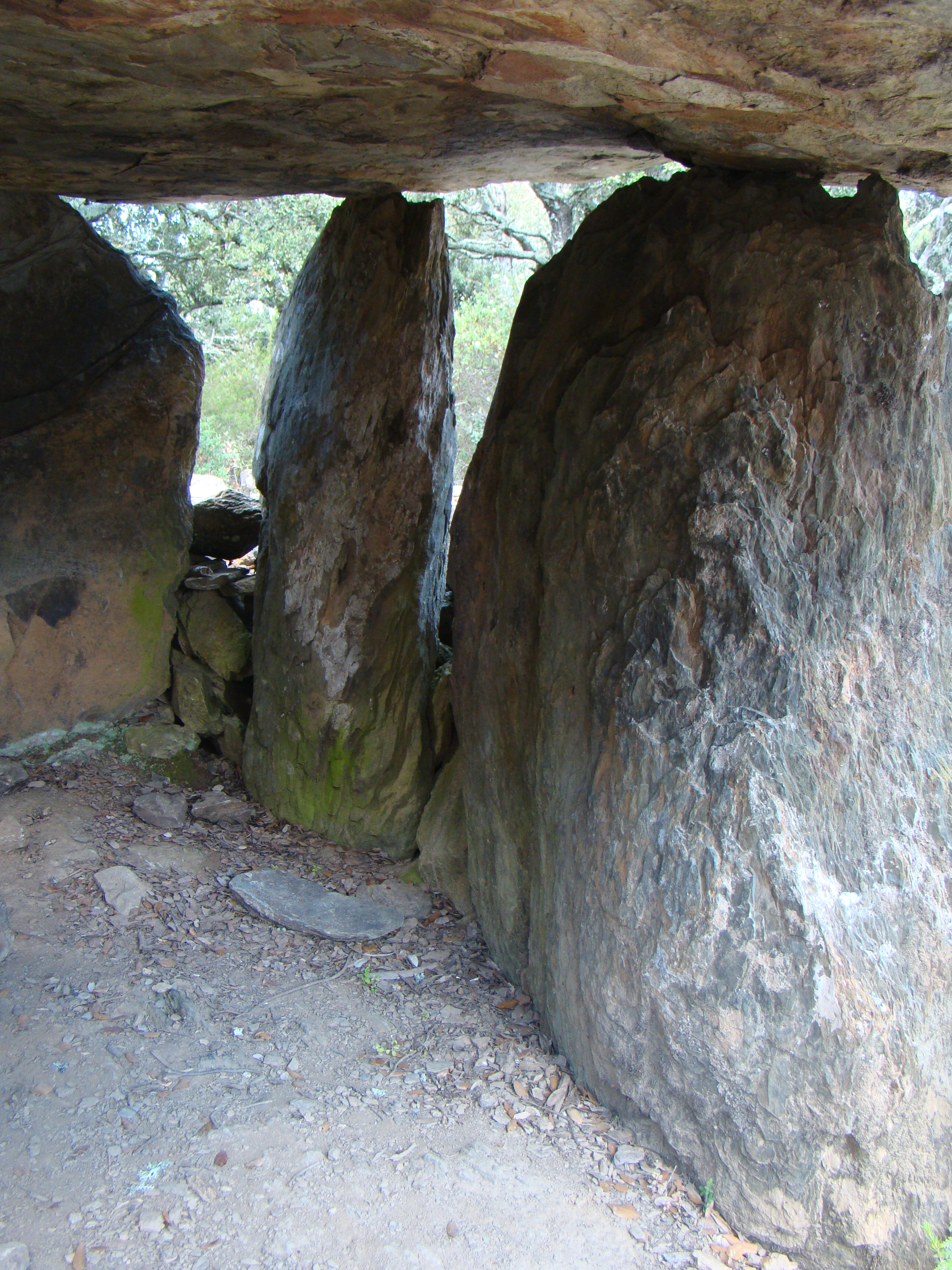
right.

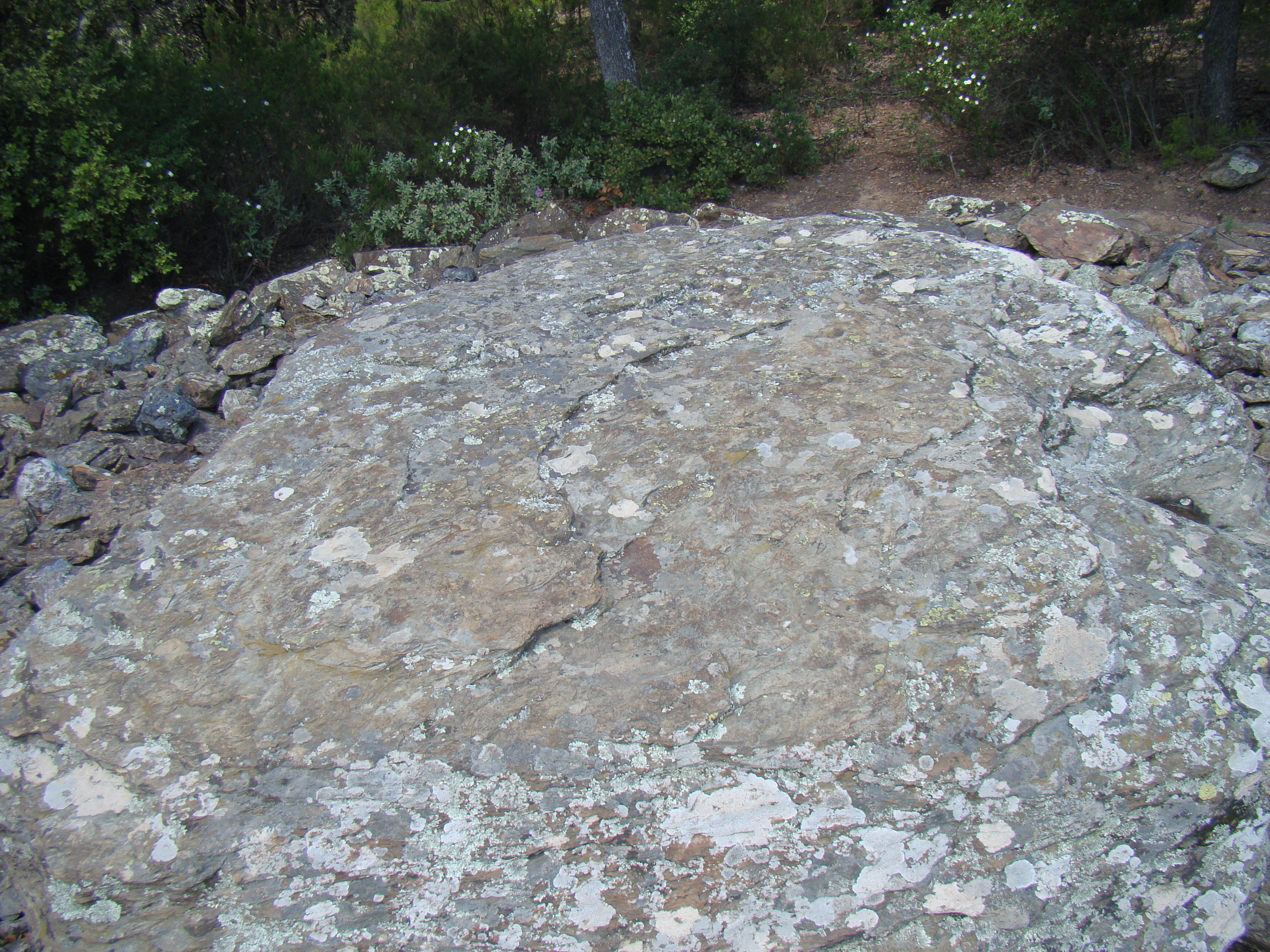
The roof slab

The cover slab features numerous engravings. Jean Abélanet has counted at least 82 cup marks (engraved hollows in the shape of small cups), some of which are linked by short grooves also engraved in the rock, as well as 34 crosses. Two larger engravings stand out: a cross in the center of the slab and an oval hollow near its top. The exact use of these engravings is unknown.

imagen Typical plan of an ancient corridor dolmen, with trapezoidal chamber.

== History ==
Typical plan of an ancient corridor dolmen, with trapezoidal chamber

According to Carreras and Tarrús, the Coll de la Llosa dolmen probably belongs to the group of early corridor dolmens, with polygonal or trapezoidal chambers, which would date it to the 4th millennium BC. According to Jean Guilaine, there is "no reason" why dolmens in the Pyrénées-Orientales region should not be dated back to the 4th millennium BC, but there is no archaeological proof of this. According to archaeologist and prehistorian Jean-Paul Demoule and his colleagues, it is linked to the Neolithic culture of the southern Chasséen.

Since time immemorial, this dolmen has been used as a milestone between the territories of Bouleternère, Casefabre and Saint-Michel-de-Llotes. An 1828 text states that the boundary between Casefabre and Saint-Michel-de-Llotes "will end in another straight line at the Col de la Llauze, at a large flat stone on which there are several holes and some artistically engraved crosses". The chamber was looted in ancient times, the floor dug up to the point of threatening the stability of the edifice and most of the slabs moved.

The first publication on the dolmen was by Eugène Devaux in 1934,. It was subsequently studied by Pierre Ponsich and Maurice Iché (publications in 1949), then by Jean-Philippe Bocquenet in 1994, who subsequently studied and restored it. He found no furniture in the chamber, which had long since been emptied. The tumulus yielded mainly fragments of contemporary or uncharacteristic objects, along with a dozen fragments of Campaniform pottery.

== See also ==
- Siureda dolmen
- The dolmen of Coma Enestapera
- Dolmen

== Bibliography ==
- Abélanet, Jean (2011). Itinéraires mégalithiques : dolmens et rites funéraires en Roussillon et Pyrénées nord-catalanes. Canet, Trabucaire. p. 350. ISBN 9782849741245.
- Basseda, Lluís (1990). "Toponymie historique de Catalunya Nord, t. 1". Revista Terra Nostra: 796.
- Bocquenet, Jean-Philippe (1994–1995). "Casefabre. Dolmen du Coll de la Llosa". Bilan Scientifique Régional Languedoc-Roussillon: 165.
- Bocquenet, Jean-Philippe (1995–1996). "Casefabre. Dolmen du Coll de la Llosa". Bilan Scientifique Régional Languedoc-Roussillon: 138.
- Carreras Vigorós, Enric; Tarrús Galter, Josep (2013). "181 anys de recerca megalítica a la Catalunya Nord (1832-2012)". Annals de l'Institut d'Estudis Gironins: 31–184.
- Demoule, Jean-Paul; Cottiaux, Richard; Dubouloz, Jérôme; Giligny, François; et al. (2007), La Révolution néolithique en France, Archéologies de la France, La Découverte, pp. 121–140, EAN 9782707151384
- Devaux, Eugène (1934). "Dolmens à gravures en Roussillon". Bulletin de la Société Agricole, Scientifique et Littéraire des Pyrénées-Orientales. 58: 225–239.
