= Coma Enestapera dolmen =

Megalithic tomb in Occitania, France

Dolmen of Coma Enestapera
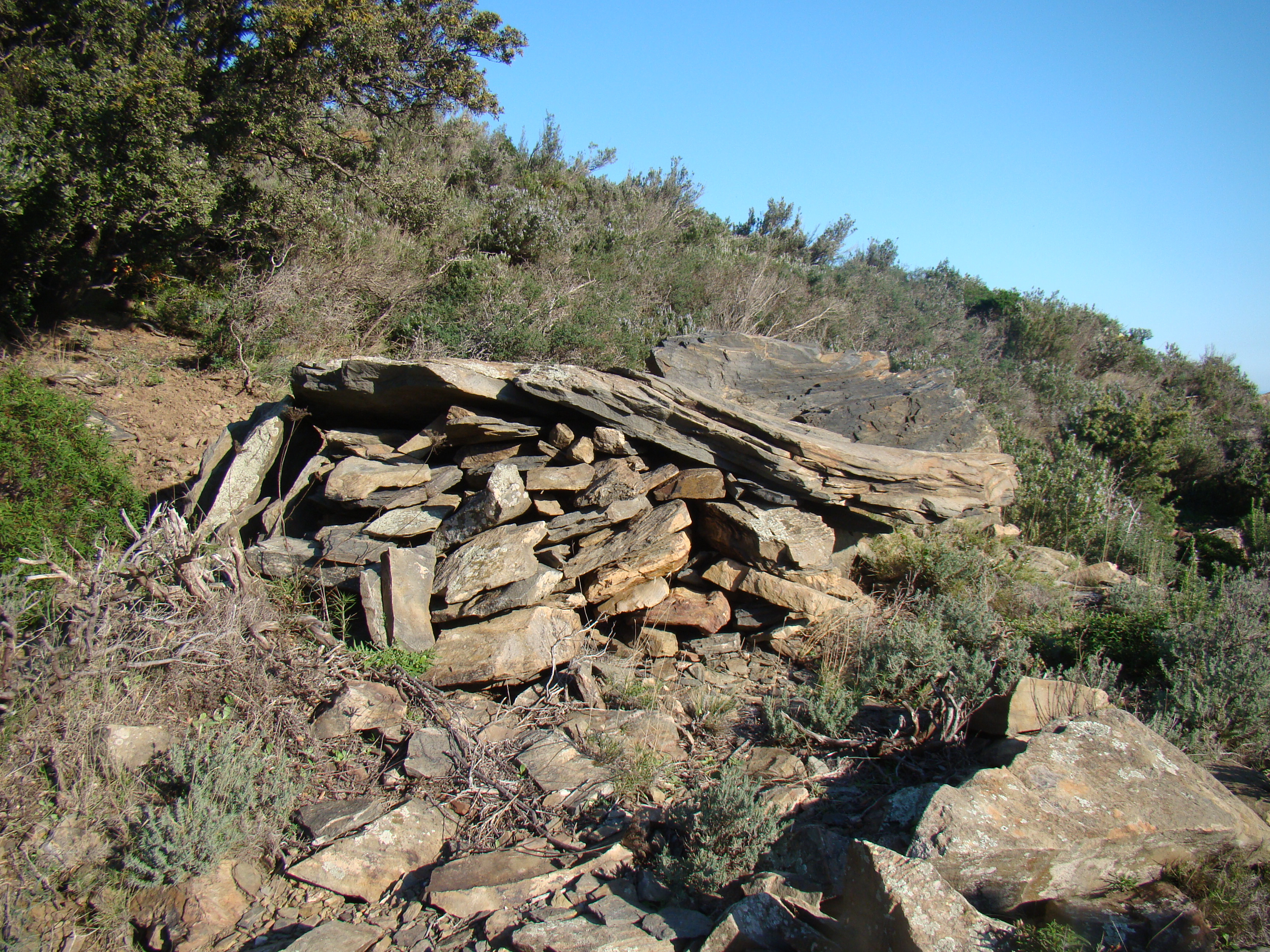
- General view of the structure
- Interactive map of Dolmen of Coma Enestapera
- Type: Dolmen
- Location: Pyrénées-Orientales, Occitanie, France

The dolmen of Coma Enestapera, or Coma Estapera, is located in Cerbère, in the French department of the Pyrénées-Orientales in the Occitanie region.

Situated on a rise in the Pyrenees massif overlooking the Mediterranean Sea, this small-scale dolmen is made of slate schist, a stone that crumbles easily. Reused and converted into shelters over the centuries, its condition makes it difficult to study. There is some debate as to whether its entrance was to the south, like most dolmens in the region, or to the north, as it is today. Excavations have yielded few results.

The dolmen is dated to the 4th or 3rd millennium BC. Although listed as a historic monument as early as 1889, it was subsequently forgotten by researchers, only to be rediscovered in 1950 and excavated in 1963. In Catalan, coma means combe and esta pera means "this stone". It was the dolmen that gave its name to the locality of Coma Estapera.

== Location ==
Administratively and politically, the Coma Estepera dolmen is located in the commune of Cerbère, which until 1889 was part of the commune of Banyuls-sur-Mer, in the French department of Pyrénées-Orientales. This commune borders Spain via the Alt Empordà comarca, in the province of Girona. The traditional language on both sides of the border is Catalan.

Cerbère lies at the eastern end of the Pyrenees, where this mountain range meets the Mediterranean Sea. Its territory takes the form of a basin surrounded by low but steep mountains.

The highest peak north of Cerbère, on the border with Banyuls-sur-Mer, is Puig Joan (458 m), from which three ridge lines run to the south-west, south-east and north. To the south of this peak, below the ridge, are the villages of Coma Estepera and Casa Cremada. 500 m south-west of Puig Joan is Coll de Cervera.

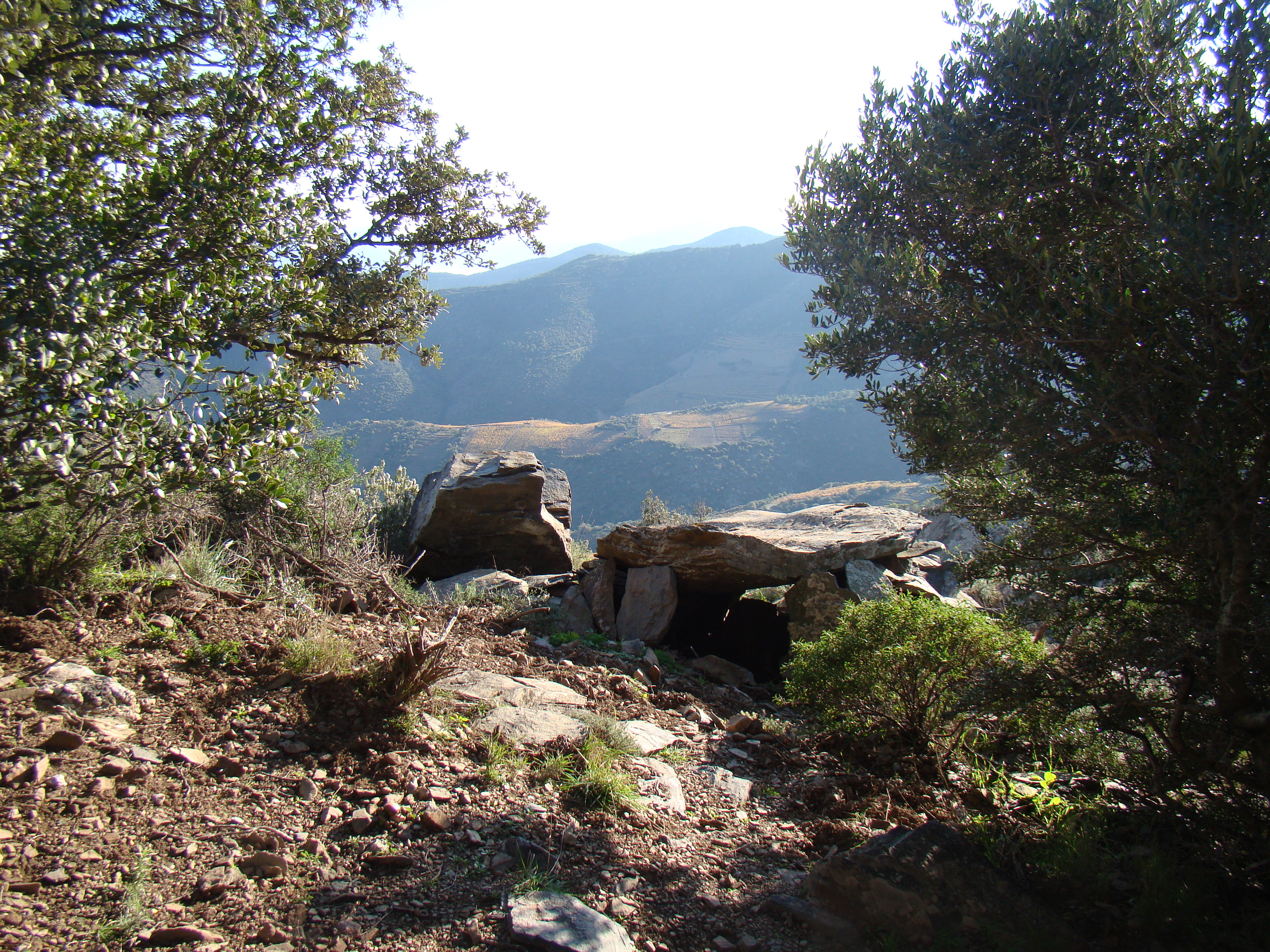
Dolmen seen from the northwest.

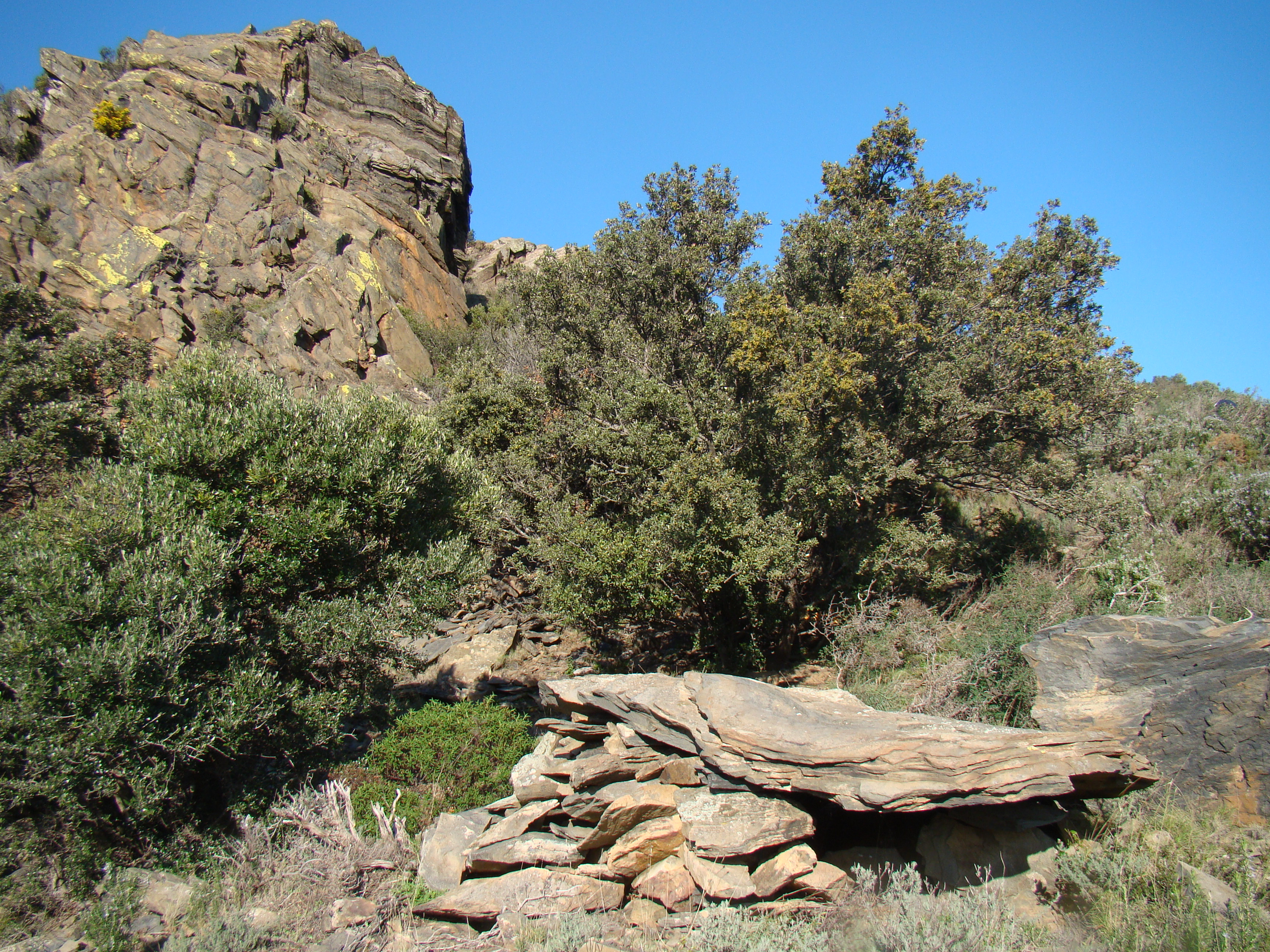
Dolmen seen from the southeast.

The Coma Enestapera dolmen is about 500 m from Puig Joan, following the ridge heading south-east past a pass called Coll del Pinyer, at the foot of a rocky outcrop. It can be reached on foot via a path that joins marked short hiking trails near a forest road. Other dolmens (Gratallops dolmen, Coll de les Portes dolmen, Coll de la Farella dolmen) and two menhirs (Pedra Dreta de Sant Salvador and Perafita menhir), can be found within a few hectometres. Generally speaking, all the dolmens in the Pyrénées-Orientales are located in rugged or mountainous areas of the département, usually on a col, ridgeline or high ground.

== Toponymy ==
The current name of the dolmen is "Coma Enestapera dolmen" or "Coma Estapera". Like most microtoponyms in the Pyrénées-Orientales region, it is a Catalan name.

The Catalan word coma is a French synonym for combe, which is used in the region. La Coma Estapera means "the combe where this stone is, or the stone", and it was the presence of the dolmen that gave the coma its name.

This dolmen has also been called "dolmen du Coll de Cerverol" (former name of Coll de Cervera, wrong location) and "dolmen du Coll del Pinyer".

== Description ==
For Carreras and Tarrús, it's a corridor dolmen. According to Philippe Soulier, it's a simple dolmen, i.e. without a corridor.

The dolmen, "in fairly good condition" according to Jean Abélanet, is made of slate schist. It is composed of vertical slabs on which is laid a north-sloping cover slab approximately 2.60 m long and 1.60 m wide. The chamber is trapezoidal in shape. The north and south faces are approximately parallel, the north wall being the wider of the two.

The supporting slabs are thin and heavily eroded. The northern support is made up of several slabs and is heavily eroded, allowing entry into the dolmen. For Carreras and Tarrús, this is the original entrance; its orientation (most dolmens face south, often south-east) is due to the very rugged terrain. According to Jean Abélanet, who carried out the excavations, these northern slabs form a single slab in the subsoil; only the aerial part has been broken and eroded, so the entrance to the dolmen was normally from the south, where the wall is formed by two smaller slabs that he interprets as closing slabs.

Some of the spaces left by the main slabs were filled in with stones after the dolmen was built, so that it could be used as a shelter. The tumulus is flat and not very visible. It may have been six metres in diameter.

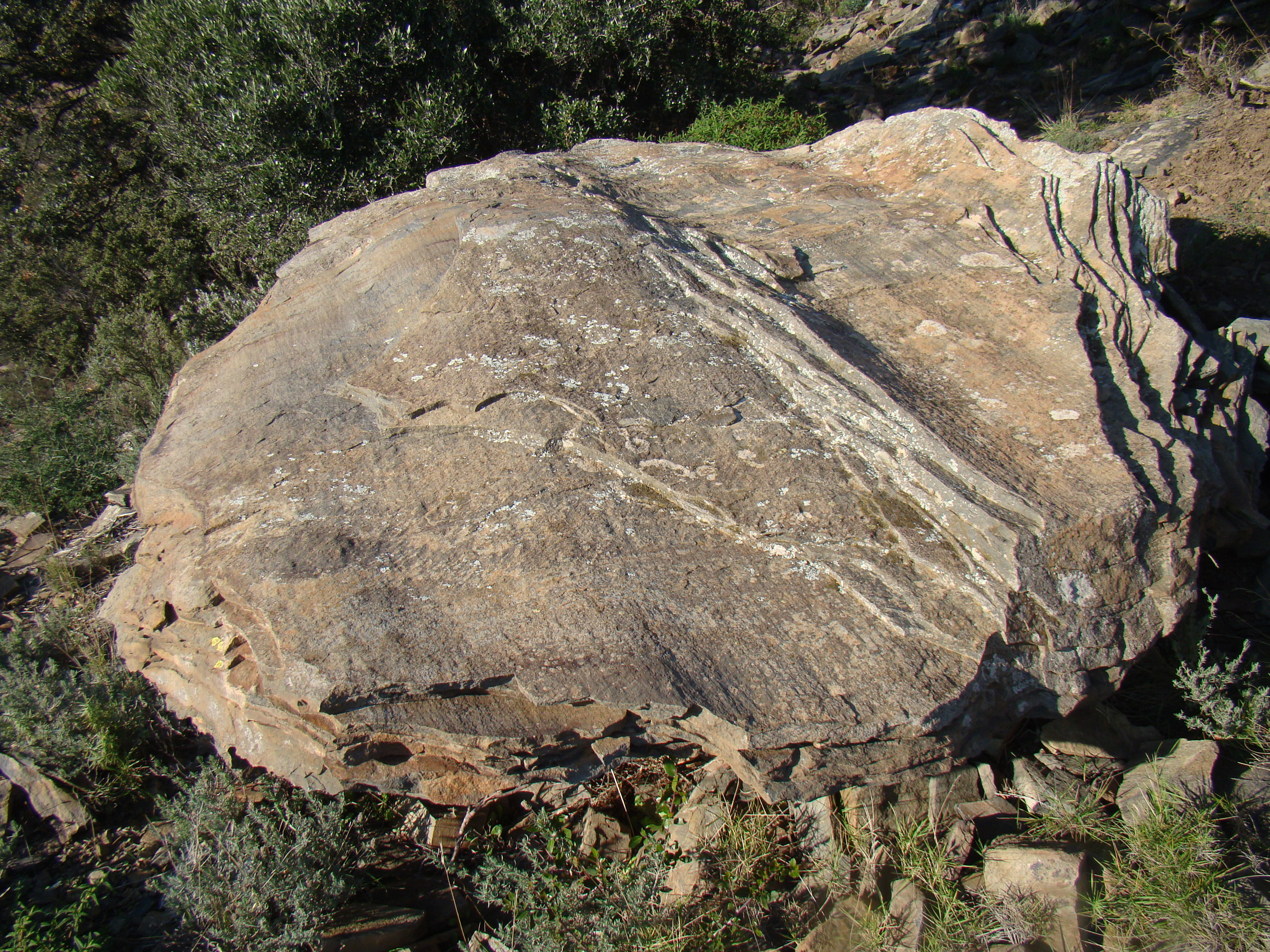
The roof slab.

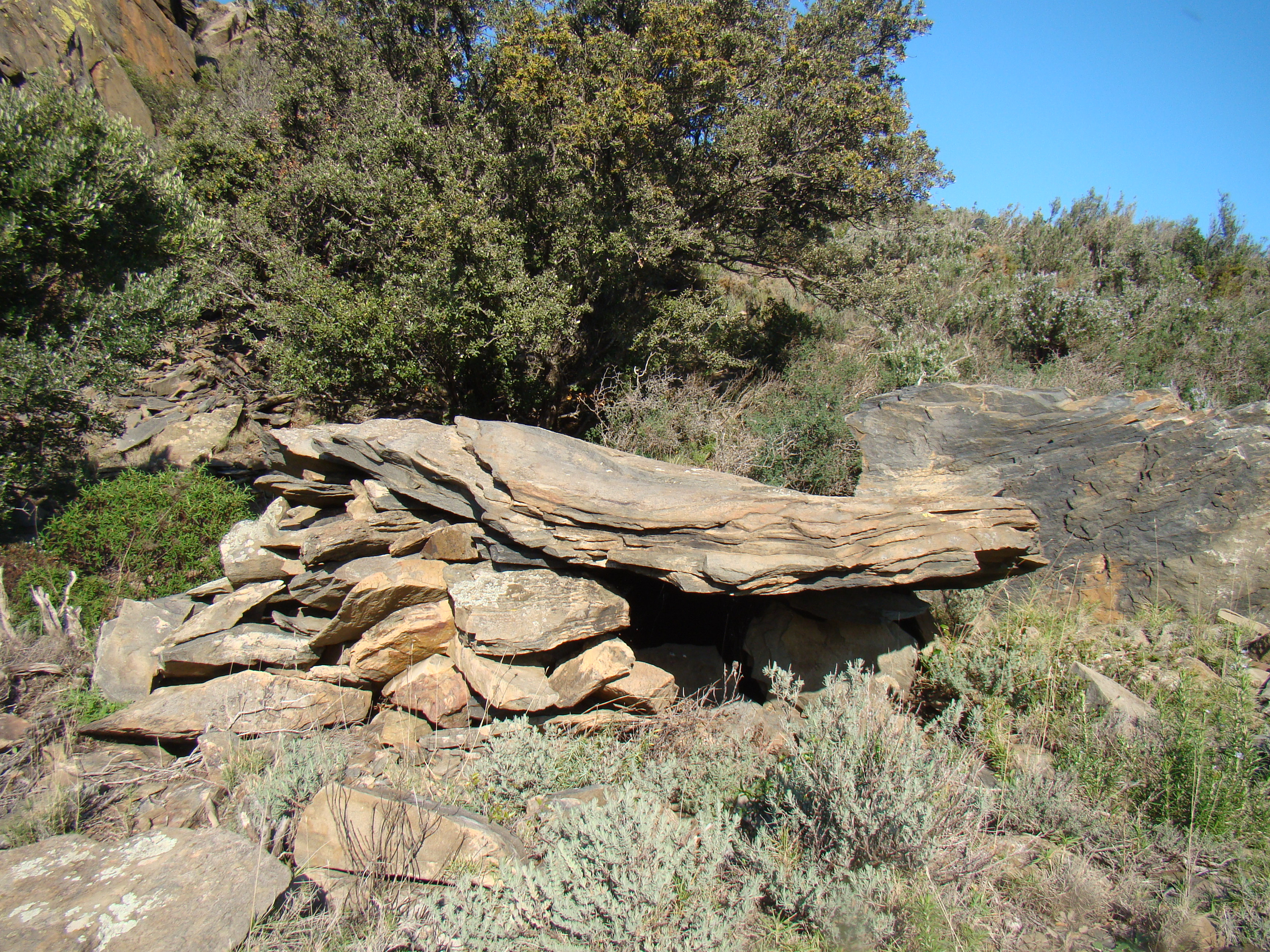
North entrance (right) and east face.

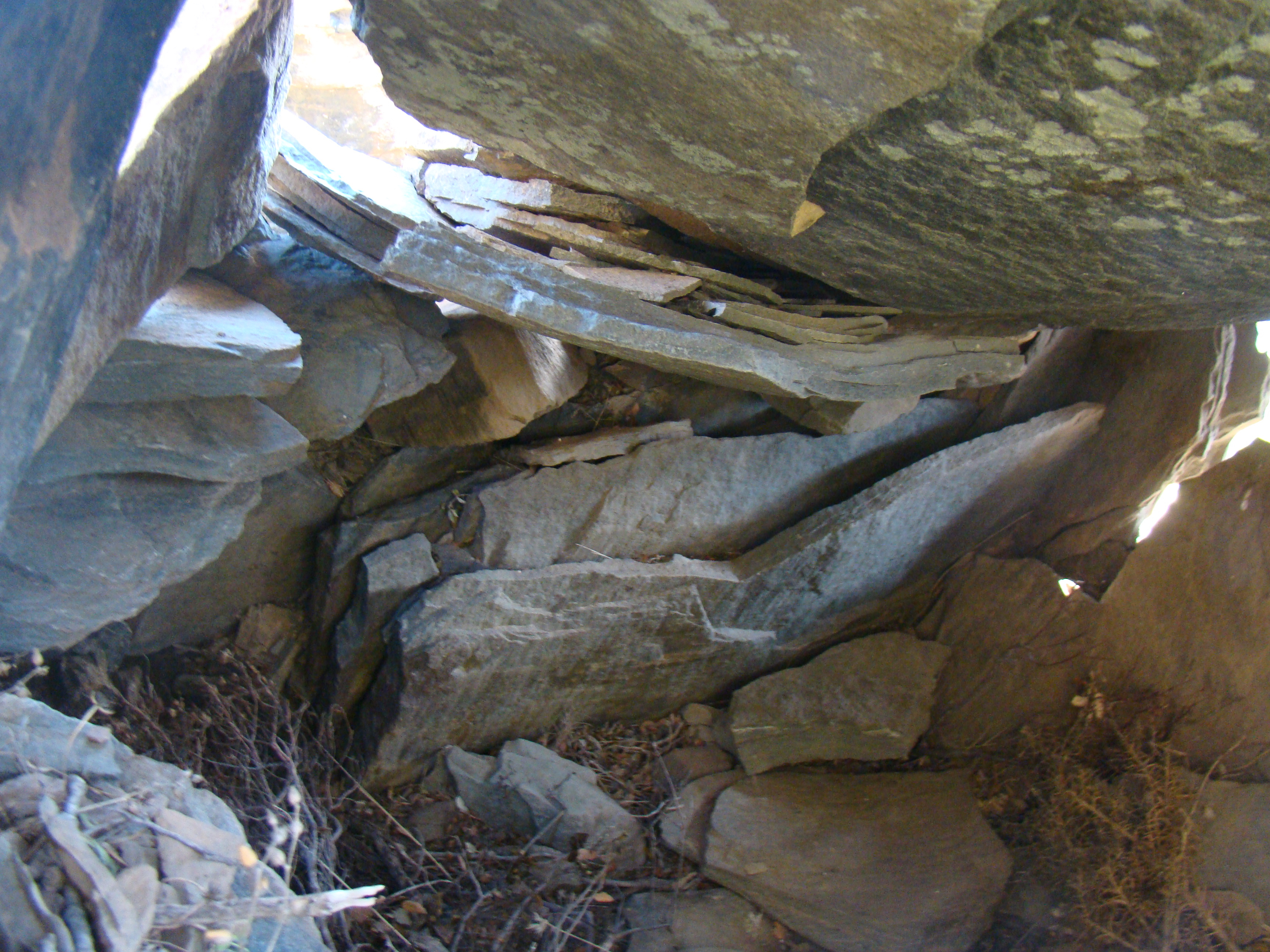
Chamber interior.

== History ==
The dolmen's type can be used to date it. For Carreras and Tarrús, it belongs to the group of early corridor dolmens, with polygonal or trapezoidal chambers dated to the 4th millennium BC. Simple dolmens were built around the second half of the 3rd millennium B.C. According to Jean Guilaine, there's "no reason" why dolmens in the Pyrénées-Orientales should be dated back to the 4th millennium BC, but there's no archaeological proof of this.

The burial chamber was breached at a very early date, and the dolmen converted into a shelter.

The first author to mention this dolmen was Ludovic Martinet in 1882. He calls it the Coll de Cerberol dolmen, describes it briefly, then in a little more detail in 1884, reporting descriptions given to him by other people and without actually visiting the site. The dolmen was listed as a historic monument in 1889. The list of historic monuments places it in Banyuls-sur-Mer. In the same year, the commune of Cerbère was created by the separation of the commune of Banyuls.

Despite its classification, the dolmen was forgotten by subsequent authors, with the exception of a 1912 publication in Madrid of a study in Spanish on the megalithic monuments of the province of Girona, which also lists the megaliths of the Pyrénées-Orientales. It was Pierre Ponsich who rediscovered the site, enabling its reappearance in an inventory of the dolmens of Roussillon published in 1950, accompanied by a map. It is then regularly cited in publications on the department's megaliths.

In 1963, the dolmen chamber was excavated by Jean Abélanet and Pierre Ponsich. Only charcoal, fragments of glazed and modelled ceramics, an "indefinable" metal tool, iron shoe nails and a small flint chip were found.

In 1987, this dolmen was studied and published by GESEART (Grup Empordanès de Salvaguarda i Estudi de l'Arquitectura Rural i Tradicional), a group of archaeologists from Alt Empordà, Spain.

The Coma Enestapera dolmen is described in detail, with photos and plan, in Josep Tarrús Galter's thesis, defended in 1999 and published in 2002, which includes an exhaustive inventory of megalithic monuments in the cross-border Pyrenees between Roussillon and Alt Empordà, then in 2011 by Jean Abélanet in a book describing megalithism in the Pyrénées-Orientales department.

== Bibliography ==
- Abélanet, Jean (2011). Itinéraires mégalithiques : dolmens et rites funéraires en Roussillon et Pyrénées nord-catalanes. Canet, Trabucaire. ISBN 9782849741245.
- Basseda, Lluís (1990). "Toponymie historique de Catalunya Nord, t. 1". Revista Terra Nostra: 796.
- Carreras Vigorós, Enric; Tarrús Galter, Josep (2013). "181 anys de recerca megalítica a la Catalunya Nord (1832-2012)". Annals de l'Institut d'Estudis Gironins (54): 31–184.

== See also ==
- Siureda dolmen
- Dolmen
- Coll de la Llosa dolmen
