= Siureda dolmen =

Dolmen from the Neolithic period

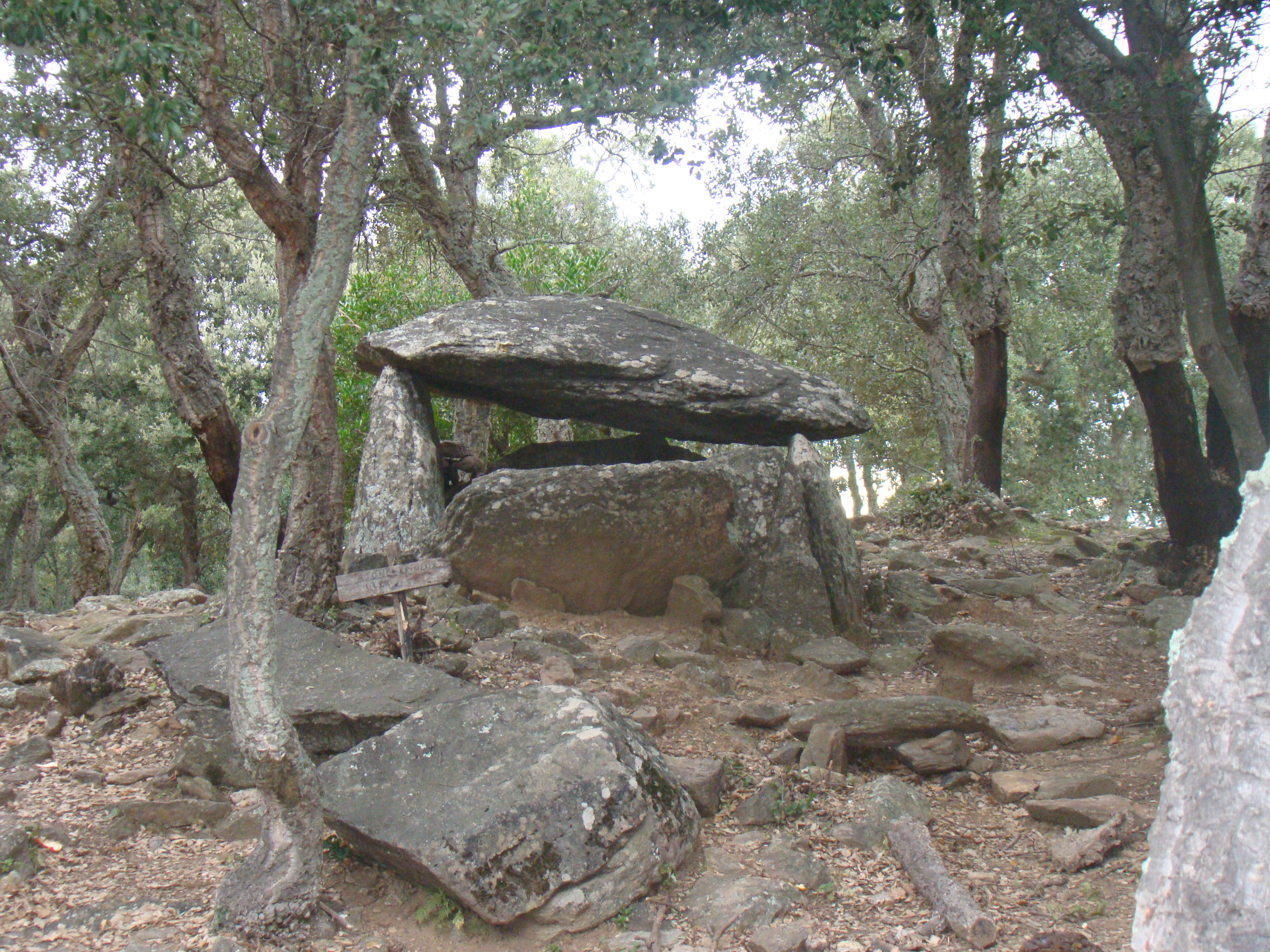
- The Siureda dolmen seen from the southeast
- Interactive map of Siureda dolmen
- Type: Dolmen
- Location: Occitania, France

History
- Built: c. 2100 BC

Site notes
- Material: Gneiss
- Public access: Free access, on a roadside

The Siureda dolmen is a rectangular dolmen with a simple plan (i.e. no corridor) located in Maureillas-las-Illas, in the French department of Pyrénées-Orientales, at the eastern end of the Pyrenees. Its name derives from the Catalan word for "cork oak wood".

Built at the end of the 3rd millennium BC as a collective burial site, it features an original system that allowed it to be opened and the bodies of the deceased deposited inside. Its layout and southeast orientation are typical of dolmens in this département. Reused several times over the ages, it was rediscovered in 1985 and then archaeologically excavated. While the dolmen and its tumulus are well preserved, excavations have uncovered only small shards of pottery and a few small objects, including a pearl, a fusaïole (part of a textile spinning spindle), a fragment of a bronze ring, and fragments of human bone, whose dating is uncertain. Easily accessible, close to a road and marked trail, several specialized guides indicate it as a hiking destination.

== Location ==
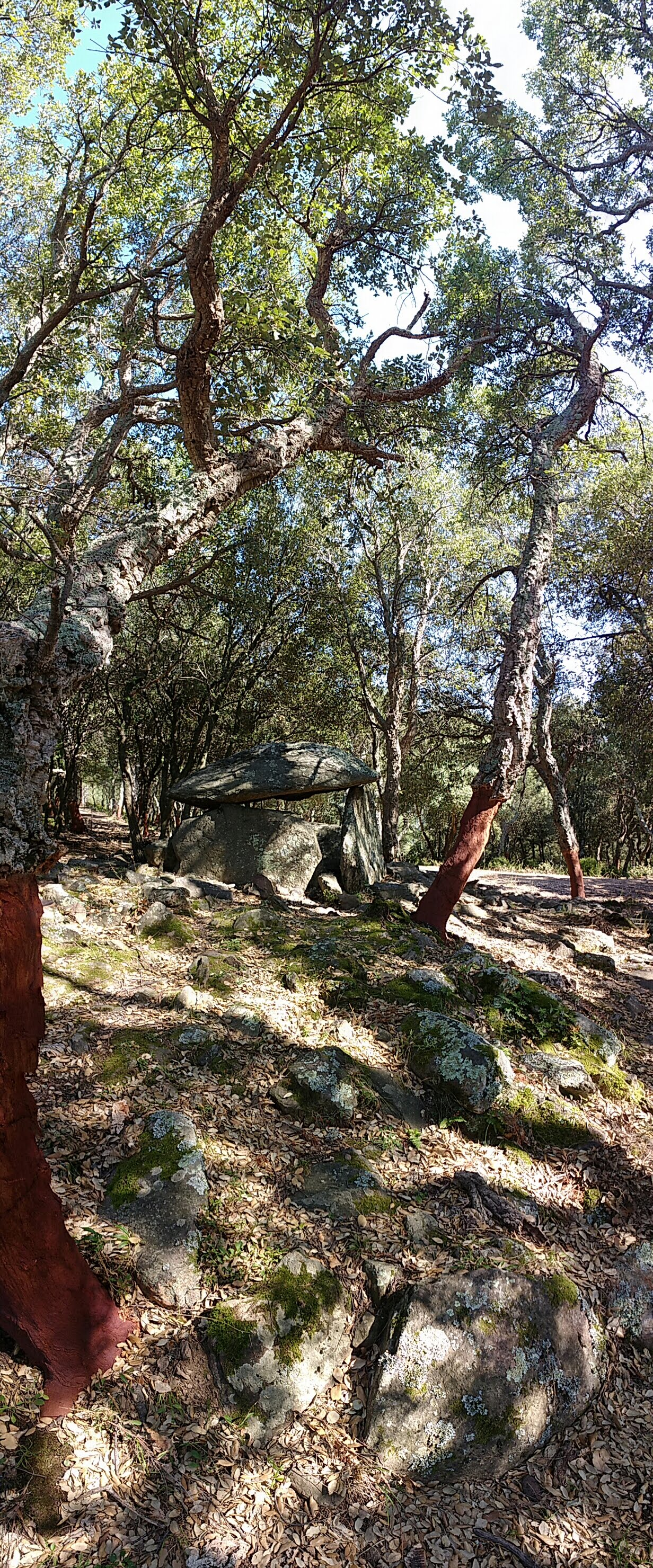
The dolmen in the cork oak grove

The Siureda dolmen is one of 148 dolmens in the Pyrénées-Orientales region, including those attested by ancient sources but never found. They are all located in hilly or mountainous areas of the département, generally on a col, ridge line, or high ground.

The dolmen is located in the commune of Maureillas-las-Illas, three kilometers from the villages of Maureillas and Céret, on a flat part of a ridgeline of hills, at 440 m altitude. These hills, composed of metamorphic and crystalline rock, form part of the easternmost part of the Pyrenees. They dominate the Roussillon Plain and the Tech Valley. The view extends as far as the Mediterranean Sea.

The hill on which the Siureda dolmen stands is covered with cork oak woods. The Catalan word siureda (or sureda) designates a cork oak grove, or cork oak plantation. This toponym is shared with the Còrrec de la Siureda, a torrent running down the hillside. No other dolmen have been found in Maureillas-las-Illas, but six toponyms in the commune, including one just 900 m from this dolmen, may indicate megalithic sites.

The dolmen is shown under its name and marked with a star on IGN map no. 2449 OT "Céret - Amélie-les-Bains-Palalda - Vallée du Tech" (1:25,000 scale), indicating a "curiosity". It is accessible via a tarmac road. A signposted footpath following part of this road allows you to reach the dolmen from the village of Maureillas on a gentle hike that also takes in the ruined Bel Œil tower. This hiking trail forms an 8.5 km-long loop.

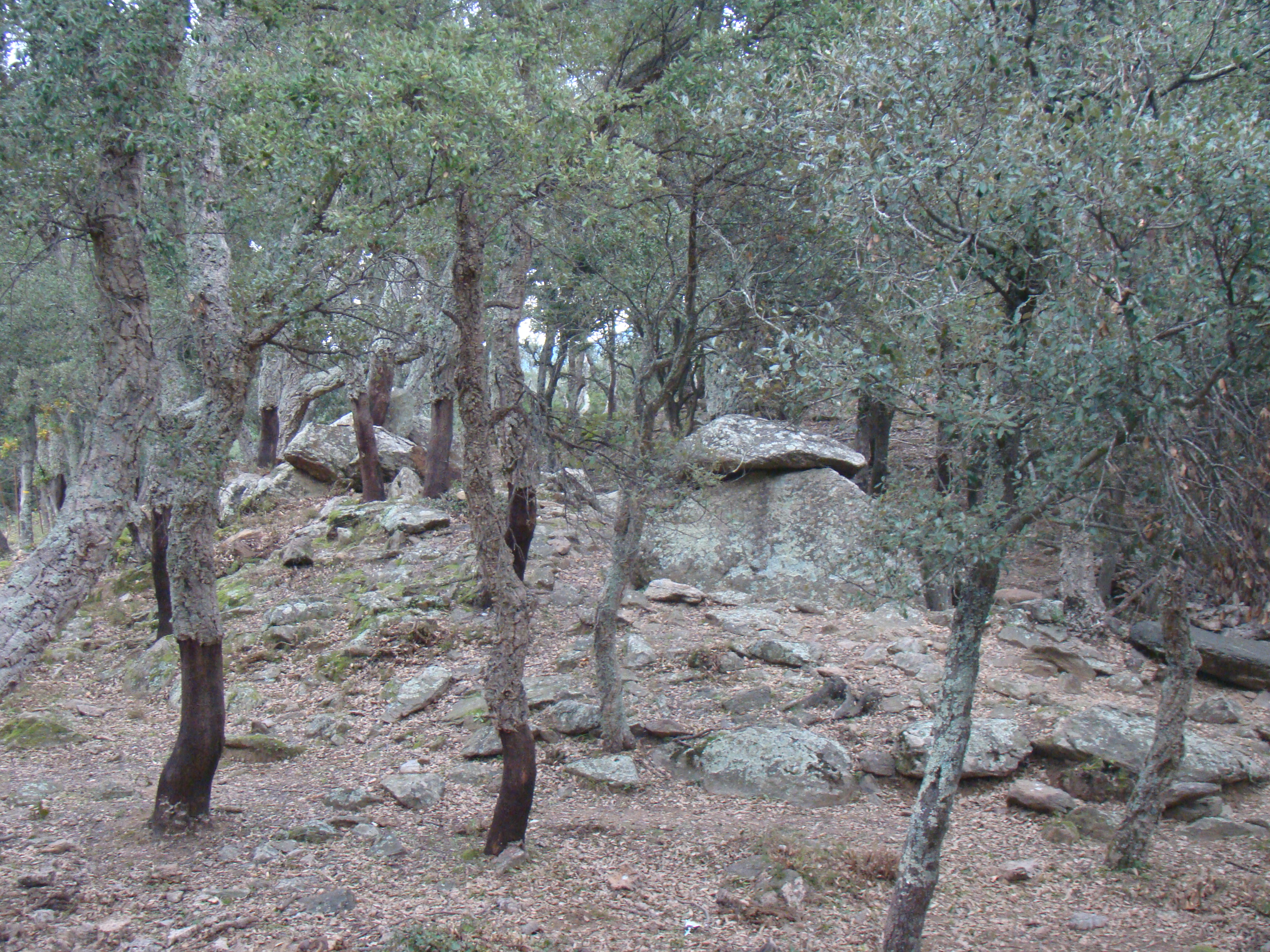
The dolmen in its environment (December 2011)

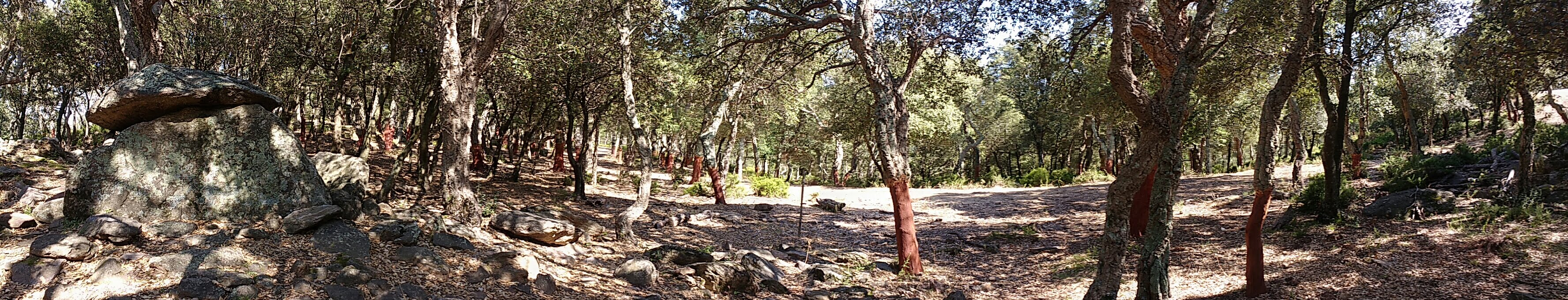
The dolmen's surroundings

== History ==
The Siureda dolmen was built in the second half of the 3rd millennium BC. The oldest artefacts uncovered by excavation date from between 2200 and 2000 BC. The dolmen was reused as a shelter or burial site in the late Bronze Age, around 1100-700 BC, and in historic times. It was also emptied or looted at an unknown time.

The dolmen was rediscovered in 1985 in a cork oak wood. It was excavated by the Groupe de Préhistoire du Vallespir et des Aspres, under the direction of Françoise Claustre, from June 1986 to 1988, and published twice, in 1988 (Claustre & Pons 1988) and 1990 (Claustre et al. 1990). Its discovery was first published on October 6, 1986, in the local newspaper L'Indépendant. It was then named "dolmen de Maureillas".

A model of the dolmen and its tumulus has been on display at Céret's Maison de l'archéologie (since renamed Maison du Patrimoine Françoise-Claustre), which showcases local archaeological collections since the museum's inauguration in July 1995.

== Dolmen and tumulus ==
Relatively well preserved, the Siureda dolmen is, like most dolmens in the département, of simple plan, i.e. without a corridor, which links it to other dolmens from the Chalcolithic and Early Bronze Age, during the second half of the 3rd millennium BC. Its orientation follows a northwest–southeast axis, with an opening to the southeast, which is also common for dolmens in this département. It consists of three vertical slabs topped by a cover slab 2.35 m long and 1.35 m wide. The chamber had a removable opening, which may have enabled burials to be spaced out over time. All slabs are made of locally quarried gneiss.

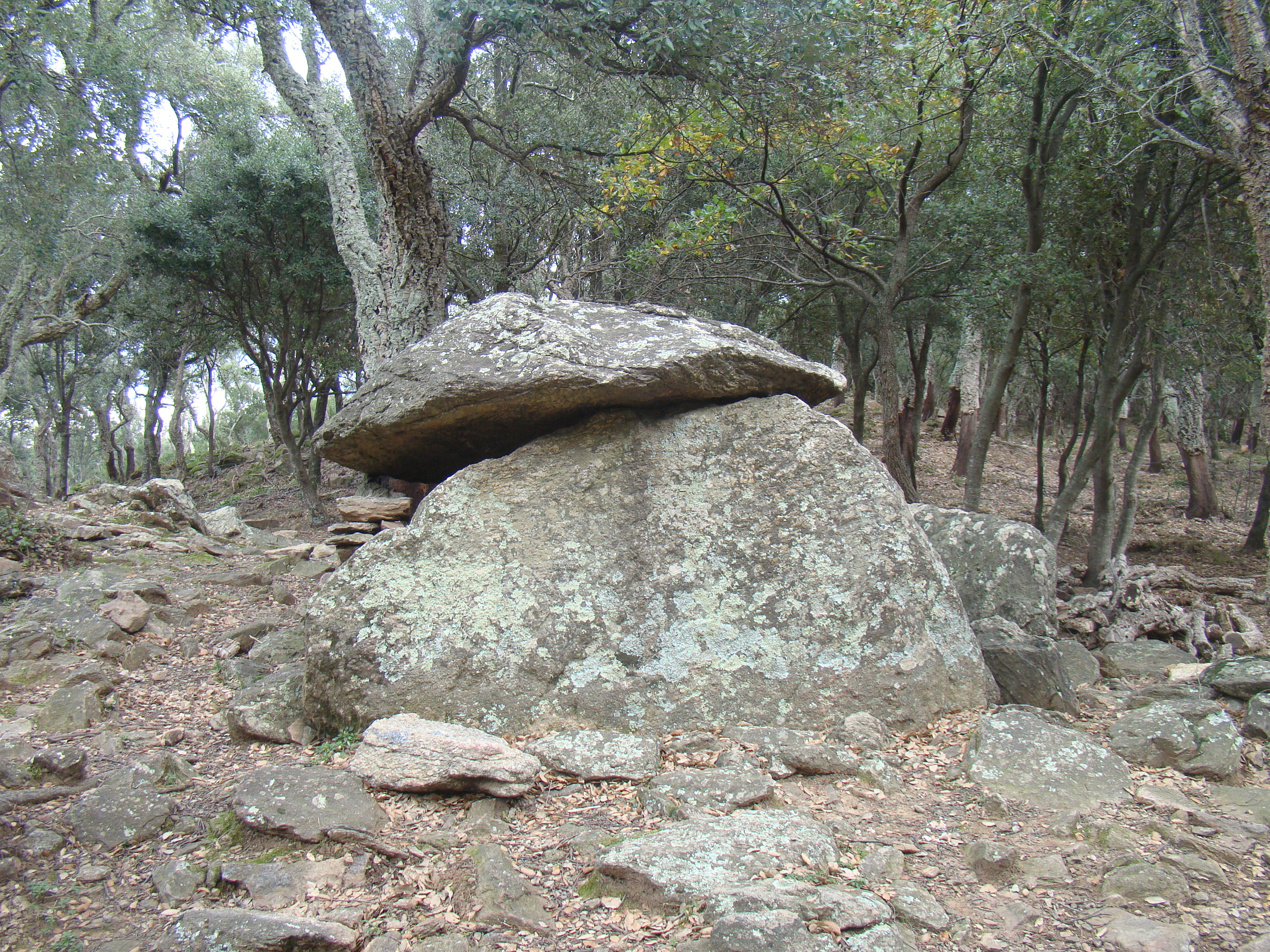
View from south-west

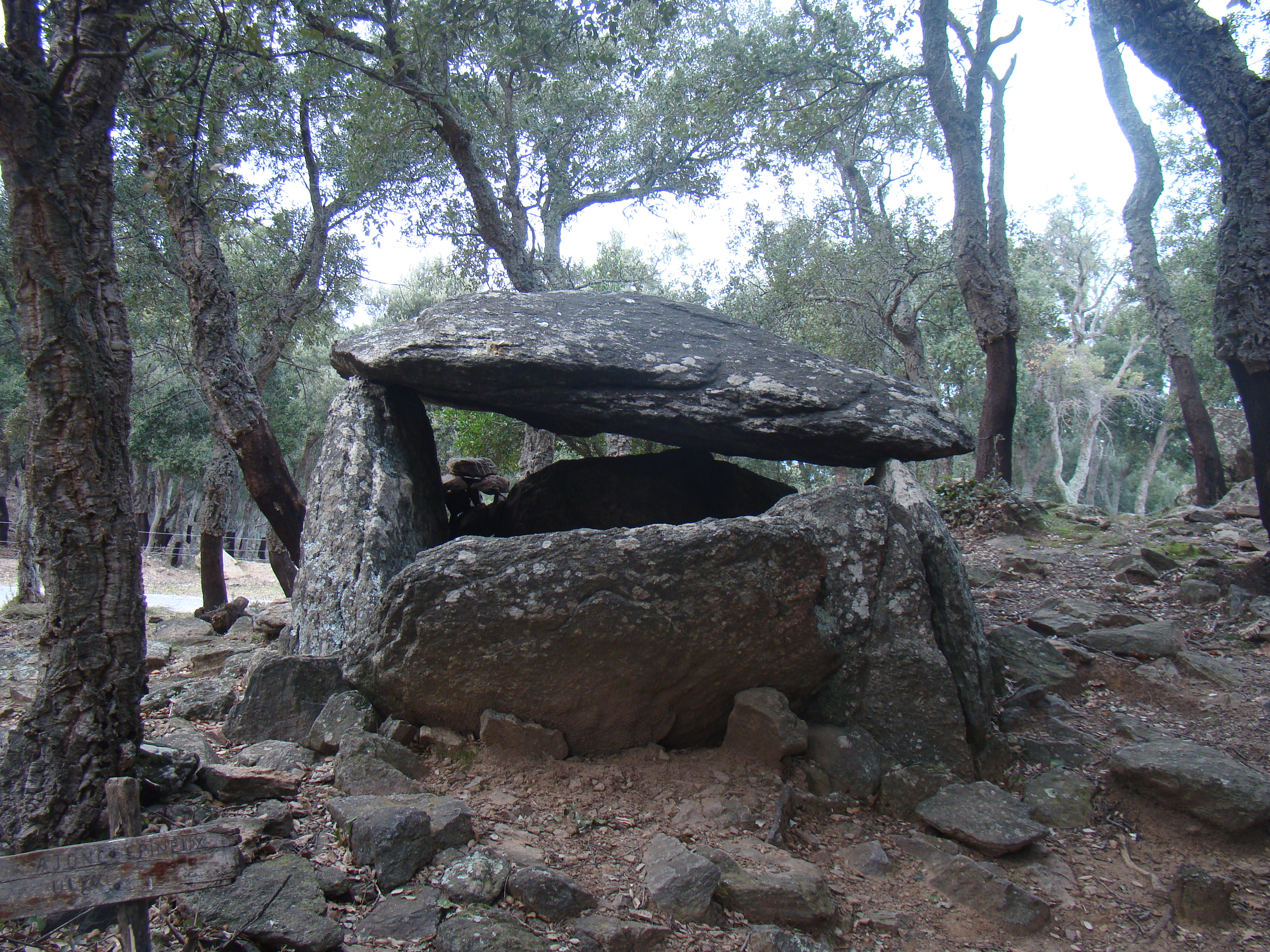
View from southeast (entrance)

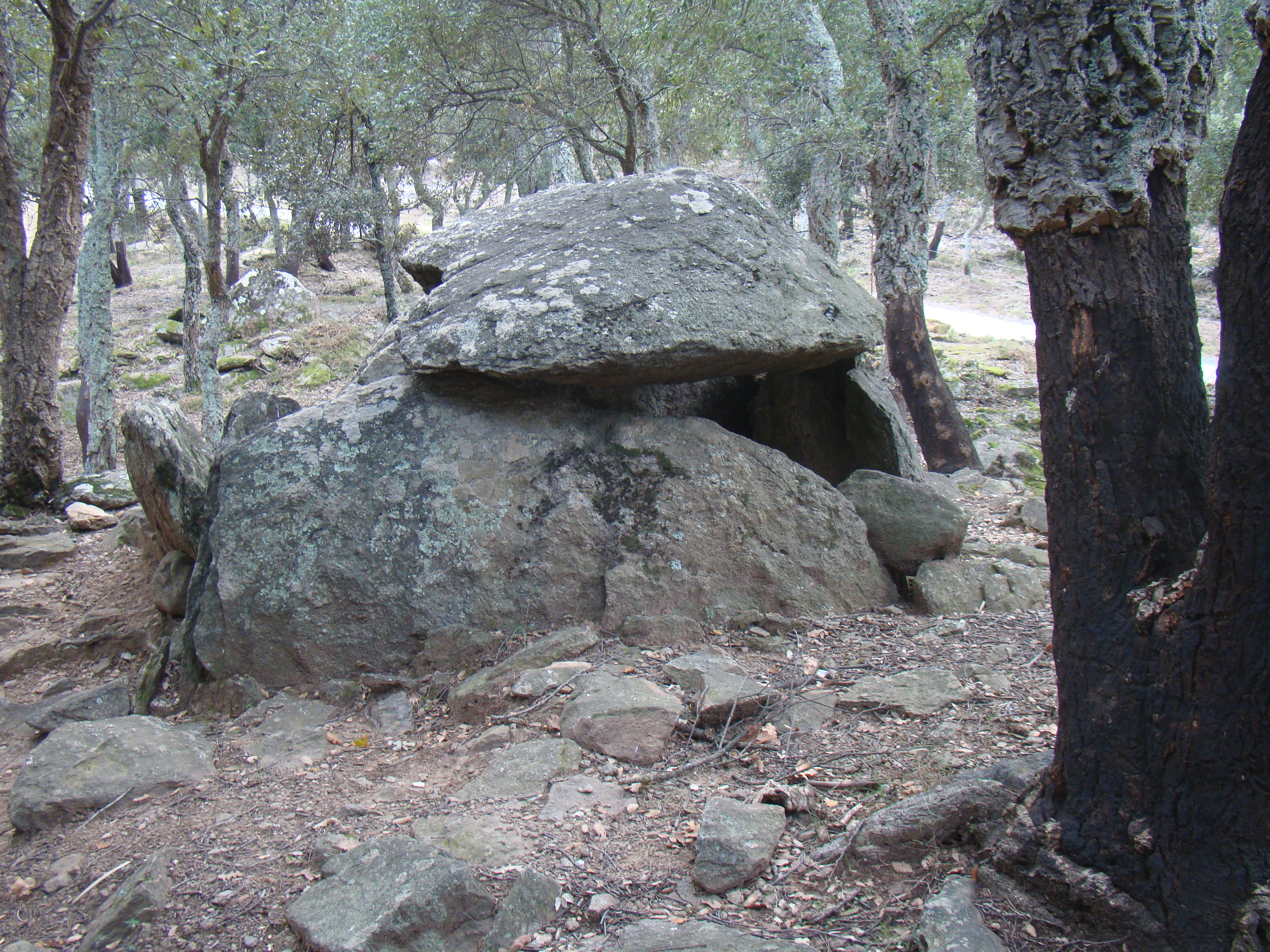
View from the northeast

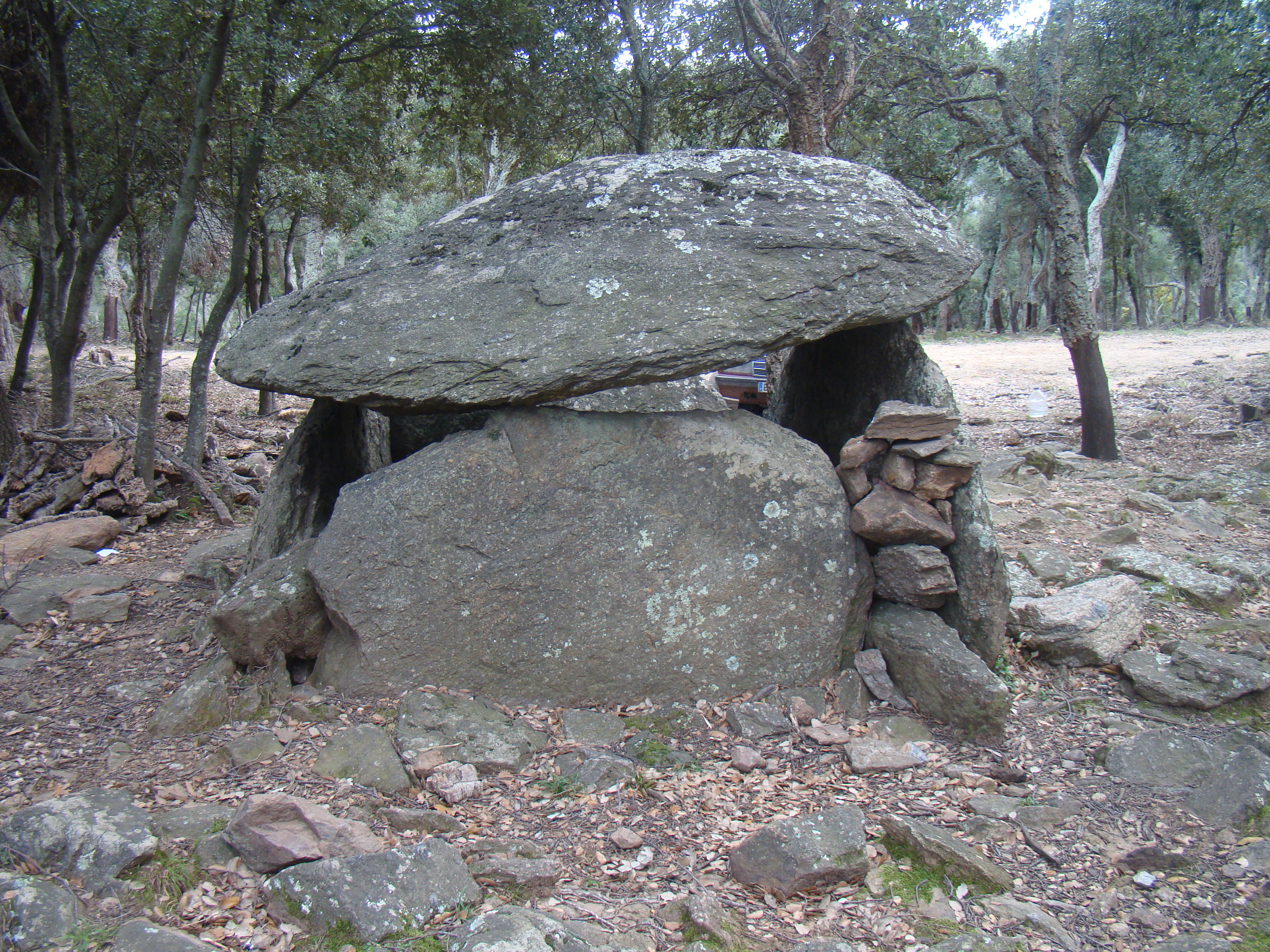
View from north-west (apse slab)

A typical Pyrenean bedroom layout

The inner chamber forms a rectangle measuring 1.6 m by 1.7 m. The largest of the vertical slabs is the one to the southwest. The smallest, collapsed and probably damaged, is the bedside slab. The dimensions of the vertical slabs are given in the following table.

Slab dimensions
Slab	Length (in m)	Height (in m)	Thickness (in cm)
Southwest slab	2.15	1.45	45
Northwest slab (apse slab)	1.55	1.1	20
Northeast slab	2	1.15	30

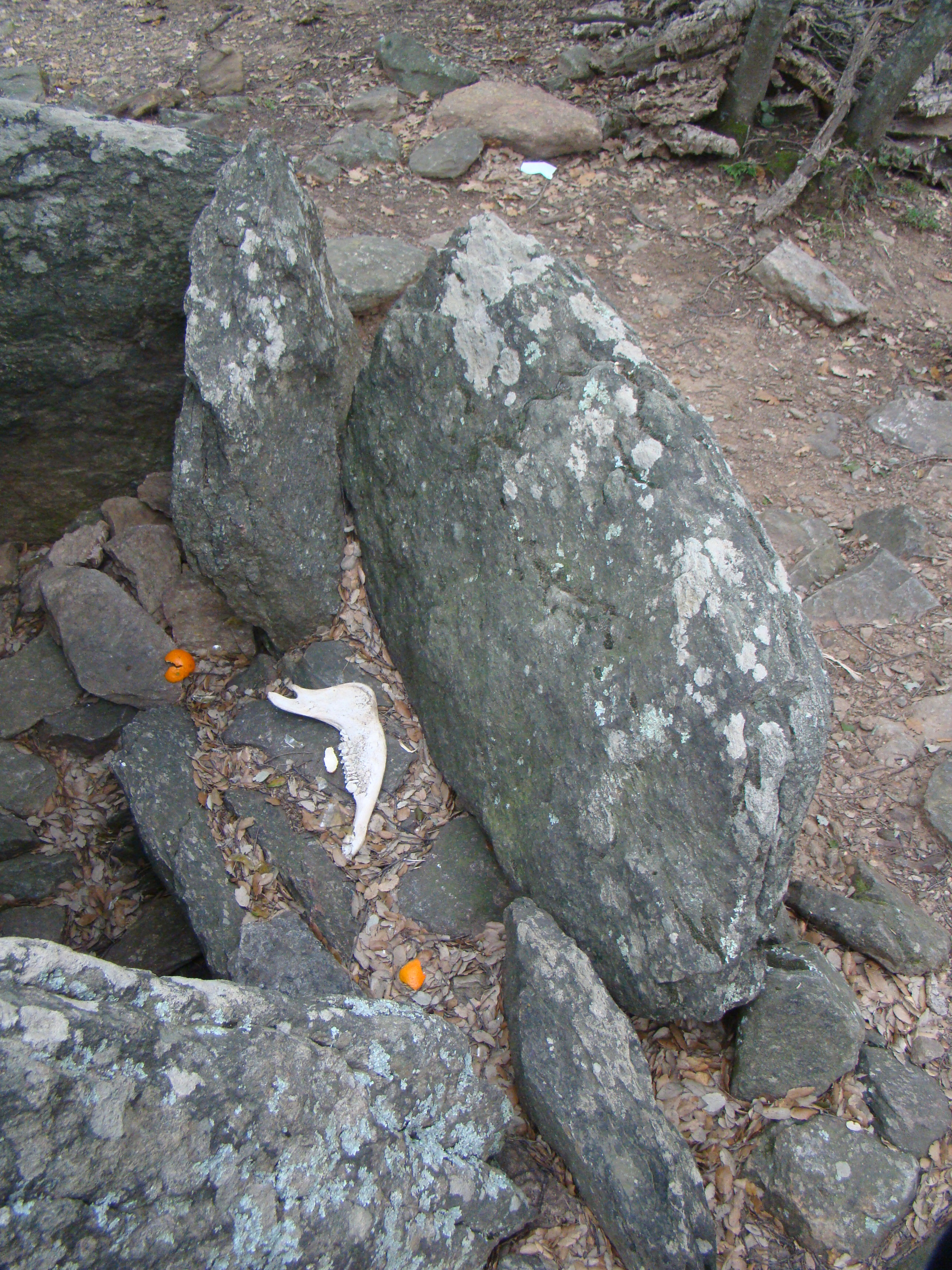
Sill tiles

The southeast face of the dolmen features an original opening system: three small vertical slabs set into the ground and a fourth, more enormous slab that could be moved over the others like a door. This system was intended to allow new corpses to be placed in the burial site. The removable slab is 1.35 m long, 85 cm wide, and 25 cm thick. Dolmens found with their closing slab are very rare. A dolmen fitted with a system like this (a removable slab and access at mid-height) is called a "porte-fenêtre dolmen" or "Pyrenean chamber". The dimensions of the vertical slabs are given in the table below.

Sill slab dimensions
Slab	Width	Height
Left slab	75 cm	1.05 meters
Center slab	1.05 meters	50 cm
Right slab	65 cm	60 cm

The dolmen is located in the center of a tumulus about ten meters in diameter and is made of boulders and earth. This tumulus is partly natural and was paved with gneiss slabs but is significantly damaged, especially in its eastern part, which has no or no more stones. At its highest point, it measures one metre. It was probably higher when it was built. Most of the stones making up the tumulus measure between 20 and 30 cm, some between 40 and 80 cm, and even more on the outer edge of the south and west sides.

Views of the tumulus
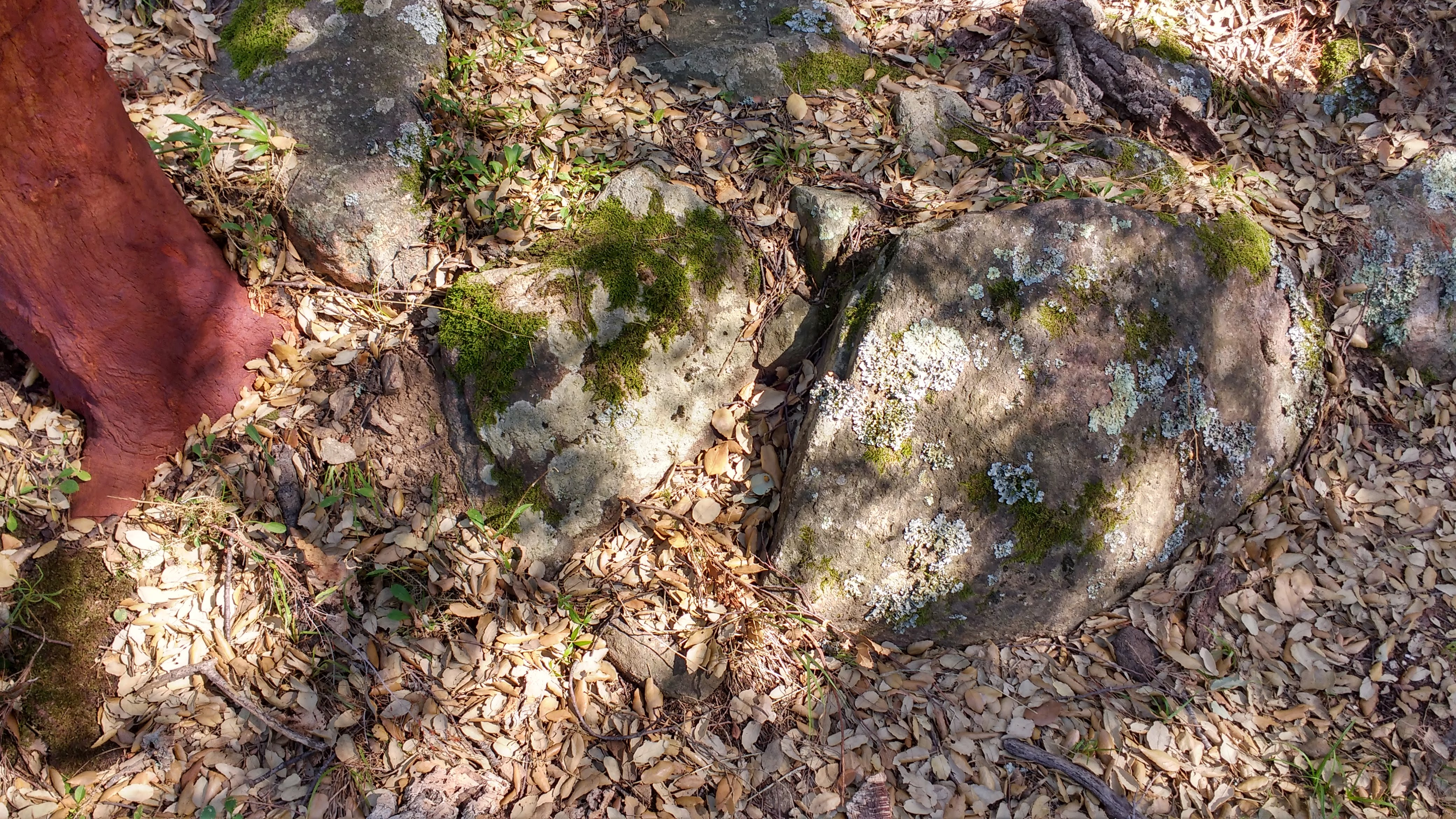

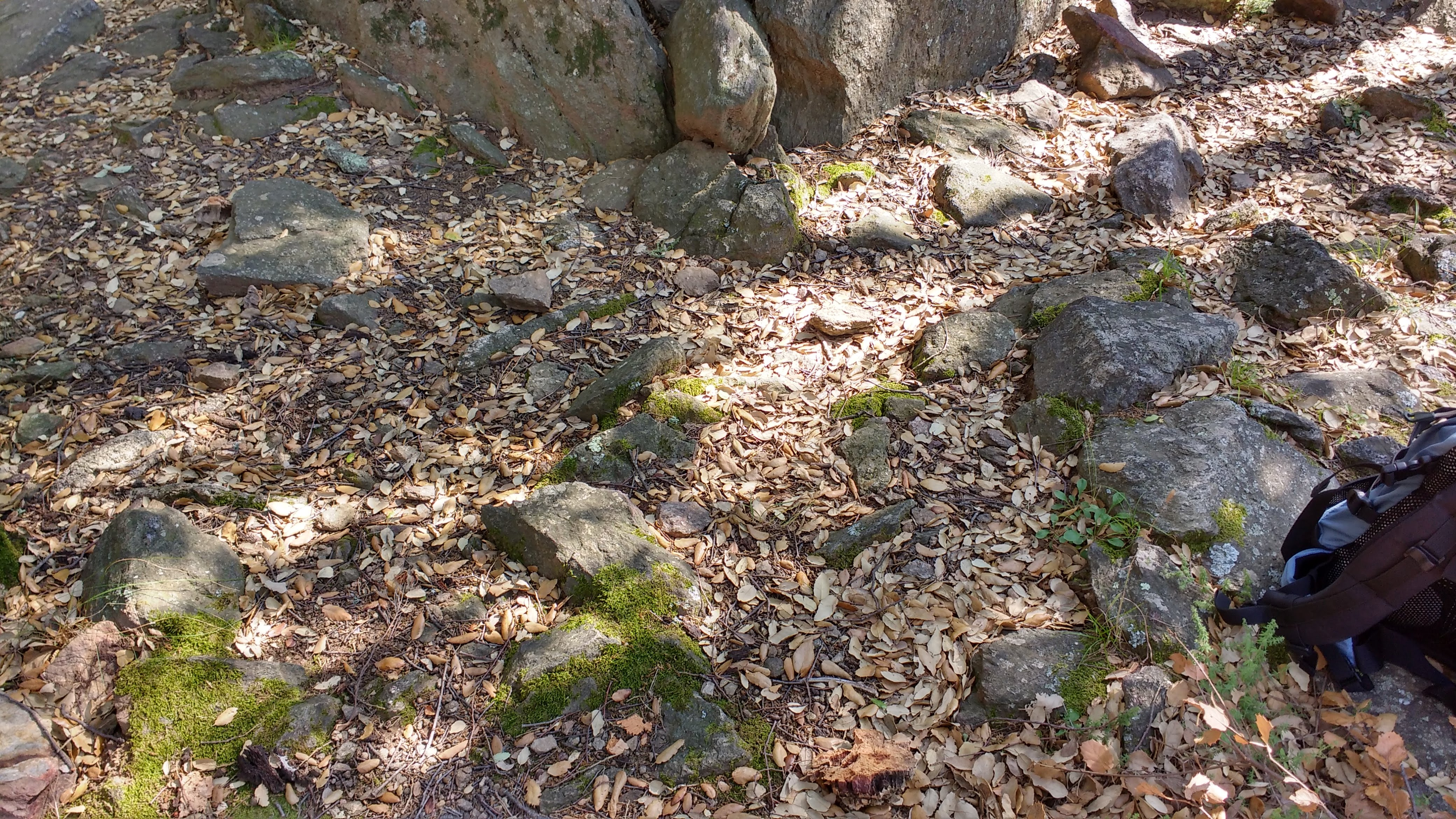

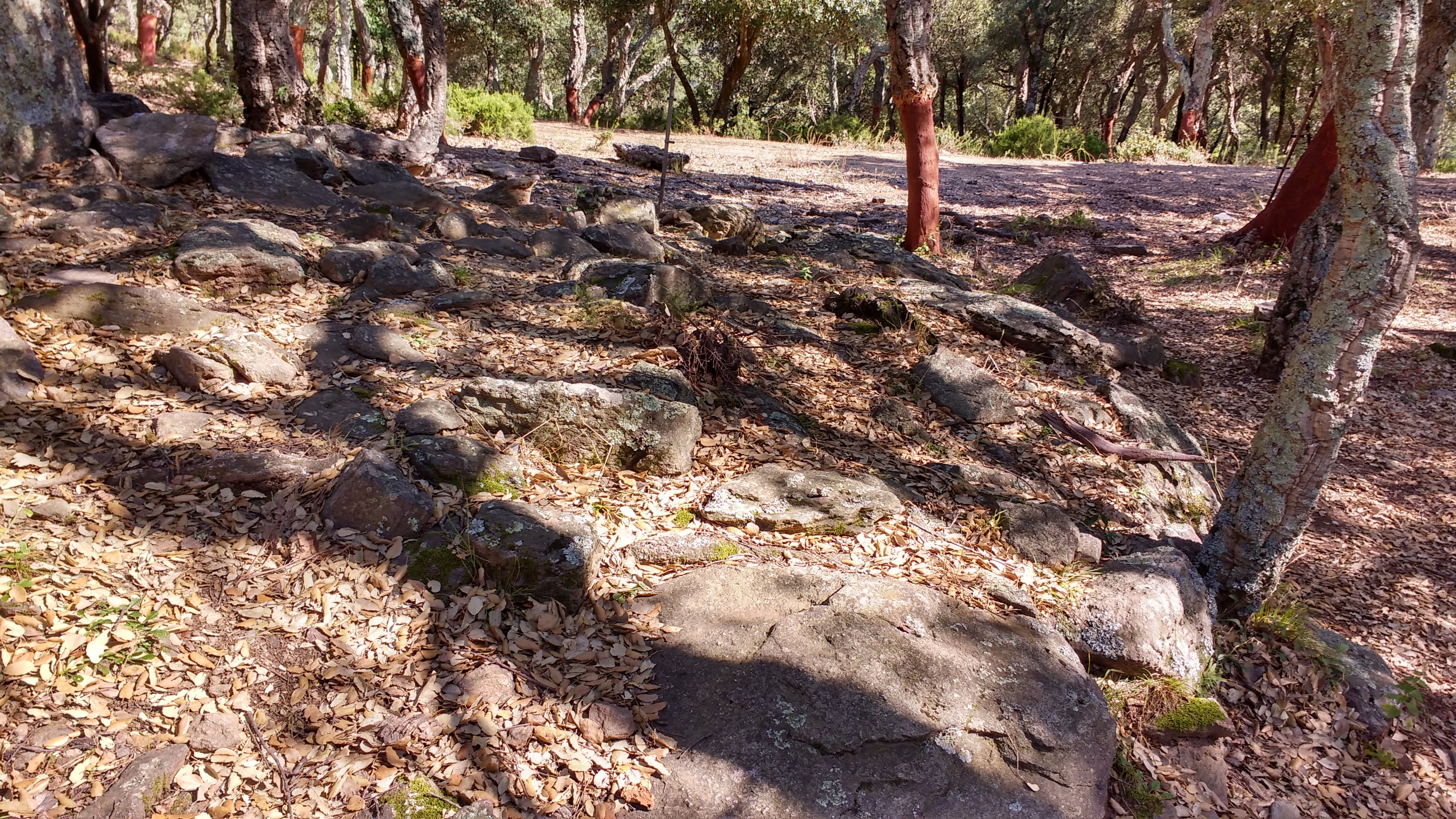

== Excavations and furniture inventory ==
Views inside the dolmen (December 2011)
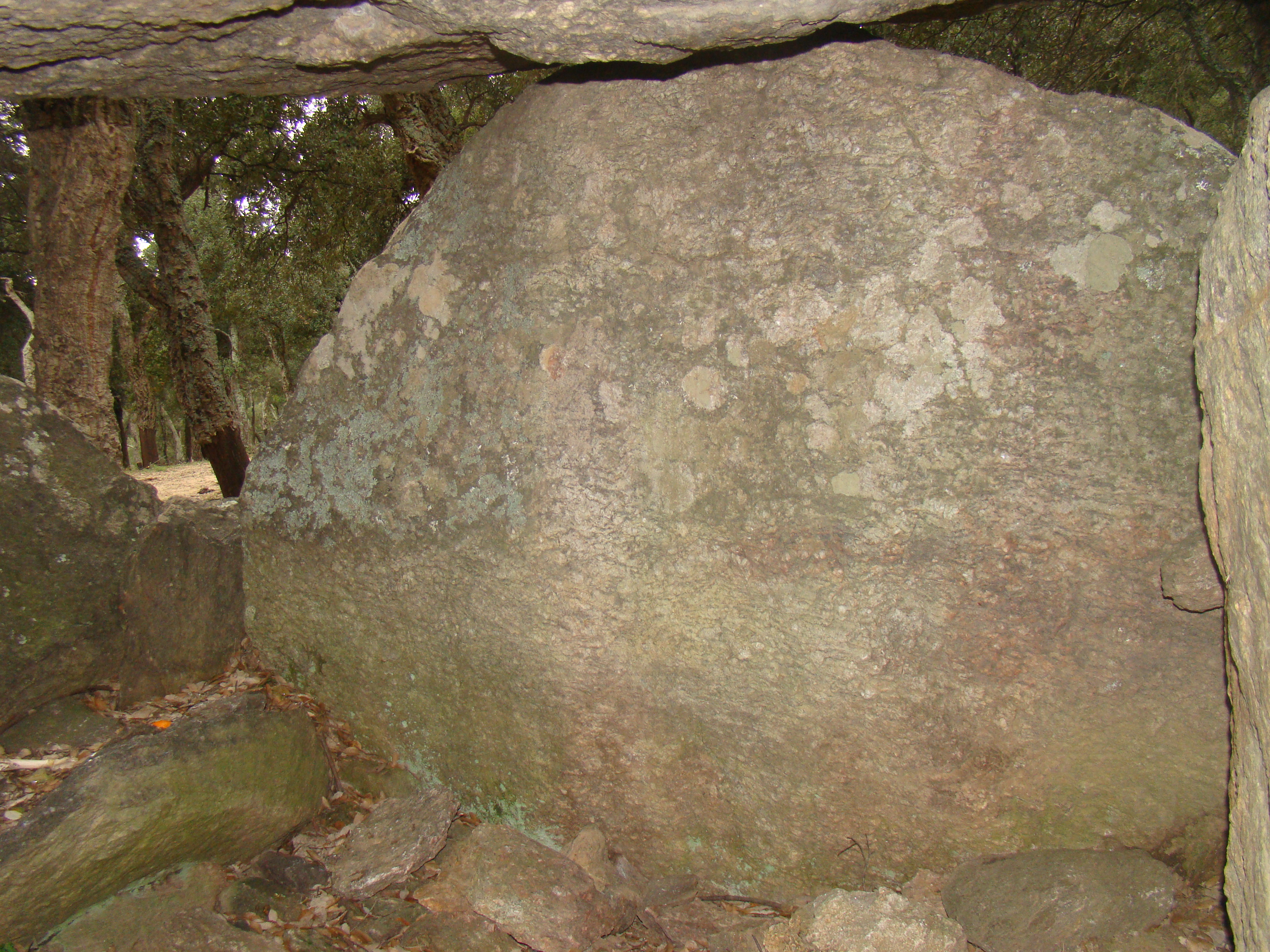
Southwest slab

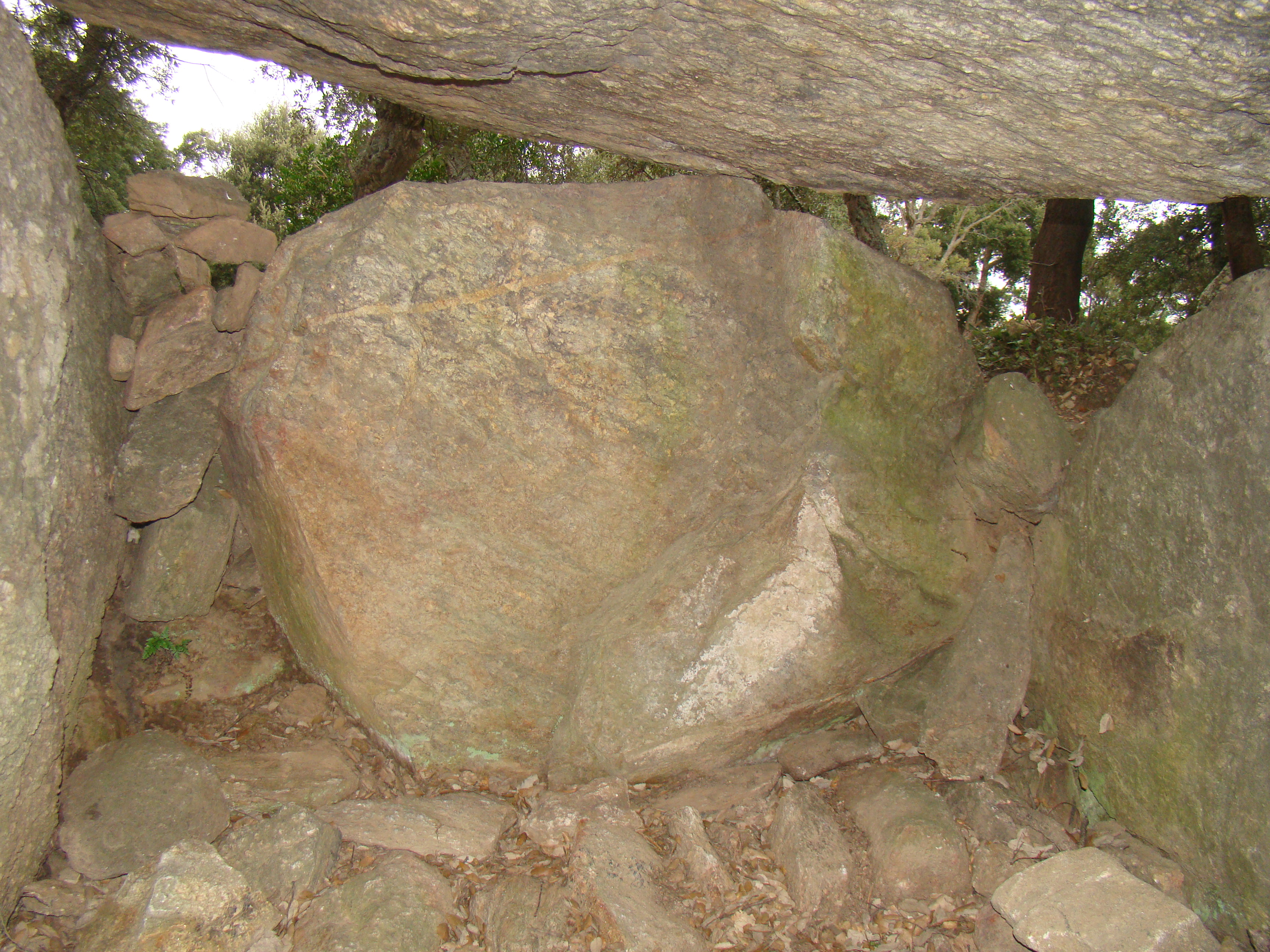
Apse slab

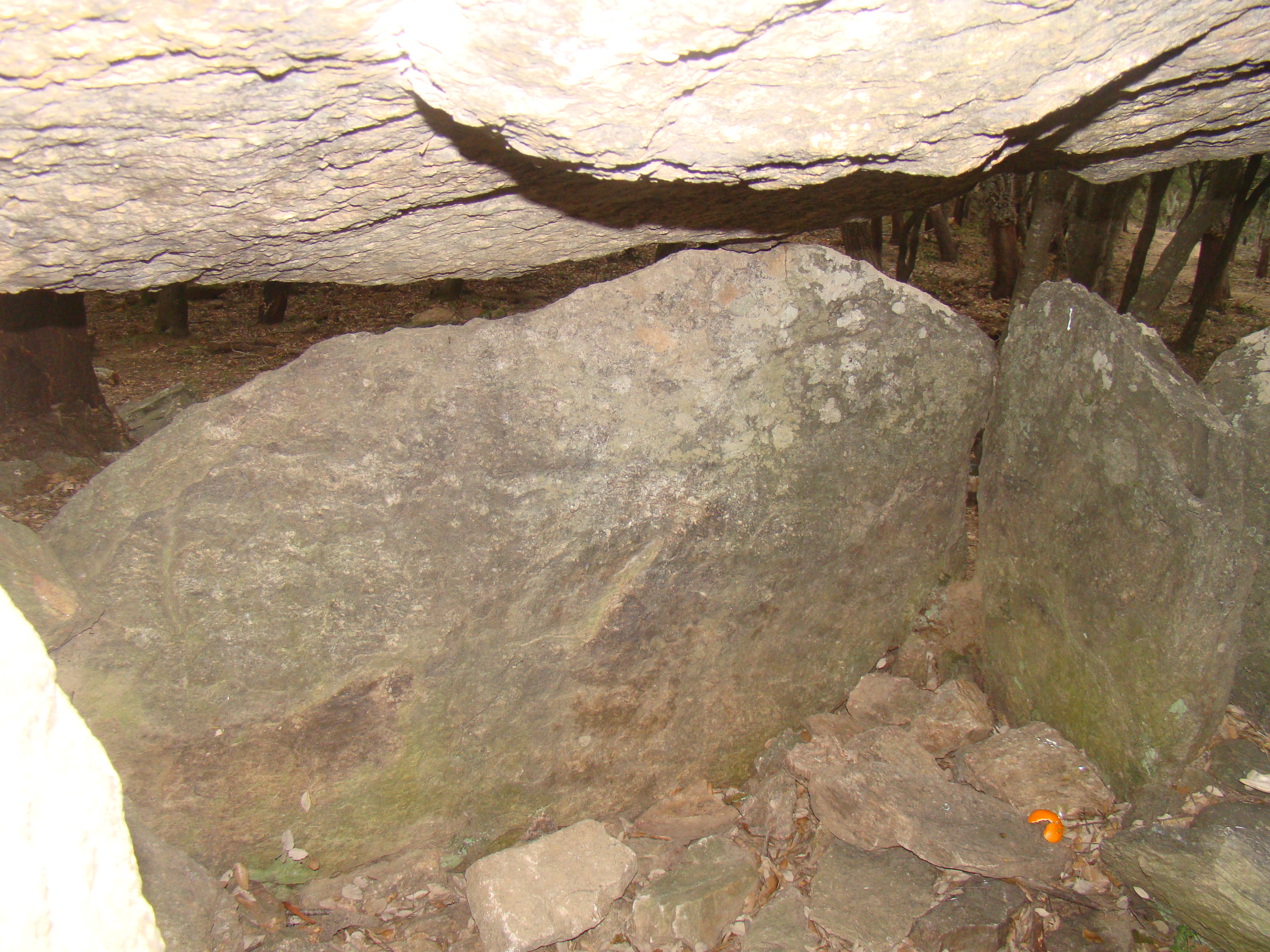
Northeast slab

The excavation began by cutting down the surrounding trees, as the dolmen was located in a wood, followed by stripping the tumulus and then the ground in front of the dolmen. The stripping revealed no archaeological remains a well-preserved tumulus, apparently undisturbed.

The dolmenic chamber was also occupied by a tree, which had to be uprooted. The chamber was filled with four layers of earth mixed with stones, 80 cm thick. The top layer (layer no. 1), around 30 cm thick, consisted of brown earth mixed with a few stones. Below this, layer no. 2, darker brown and containing more stones, including quartz, was between 40 and 45 cm thick. This was followed by two thinner layers (around 5 cm): one, No. 3, was light brown and contained no stones, and the last, No. 4, consisted of reddish sediment with few stones. The latter yielded no remains.

The three upper layers contained numerous pottery fragments from various periods. Layer no. 1 yielded sherds of ceramics produced by throwing, revealing a dating to the historic period. Other, older shards (Final Bronze Age, c. 1100-700 BC) were found in all three layers. Although highly fragmented, all these shards reveal urns, plates, bowls and cups. The plates have marlis (rims). Objects are often decorated with cupules, fluting, fingerprints, geometric figures and cordons. Excavations have also yielded a terracotta spindle whorl (a weight attached to a spindle for spinning wool or other textiles) and a fragment of a bronze ring, both from the late Bronze Age, and a fragment of a grinding wheel.

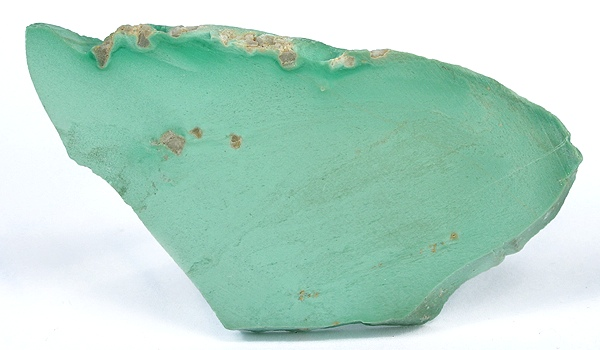
Fragment of variscite

Objects dating from the erection of the dolmen around 2000 BC are few in number: a few shards of pottery and a turquoise variscite bead. Variscite is a mineral of foreign origin that was highly prized at the time for making ornaments.

Stratum no. 3 also yielded small fragments of human bone, possibly from the first burials in the dolmen, but this dating is uncertain.

== Bibliography ==
- Abélanet, Jean (2011). Itinéraires mégalithiques : dolmens et rites funéraires en Roussillon et Pyrénées nord-catalanes. Canet, Trabucaire. p. 350. ISBN 9782849741245.

Complete inventory of all known megalithic sites in the Pyrénées-Orientales in 2011, with a presentation sheet for each site and a general overview of the megalithic phenomenon in the department.

- Carreras, Enric; Tarrús, Josep (2013). "181 anys de recerca megalítica a la Catalunya Nord (1832-2012)". Annals de l'Institut d'Estudis Gironins: 31–184.
- Claustre, Françoise; Pons, Patricia (1988). "Le dolmen de La Siureda (Maureillas) et les mégalithes du Roussillon". Groupe de préhistoire du Vallespir et des Aspres: 32.

Publication of archaeological excavation results.

- Claustre, Françoise; Pons, Patricia; Delcos, C.; Guisset, J. (1990). "Mégalithisme en Vallespir : un dolmen découvert à Maureillas (Pyrénées-Orientales)". Travaux de préhistoire catalane 1989-1990: 129–141.
- Tarrus i Galter, Josep (2002). Poblats, dòlmens i menhirs : Els grups megalitics de l'Albera, serra de Rodes i cap de Creus. Diputació de Girona. pp. 93–97. ISBN 84-95187-34-5.

== See also ==
- Coll de la Llosa dolmen
- Dolmen
- The dolmen of Coma Enestapera
