= Casefabre =

Casefabre Casafabre
- Commune
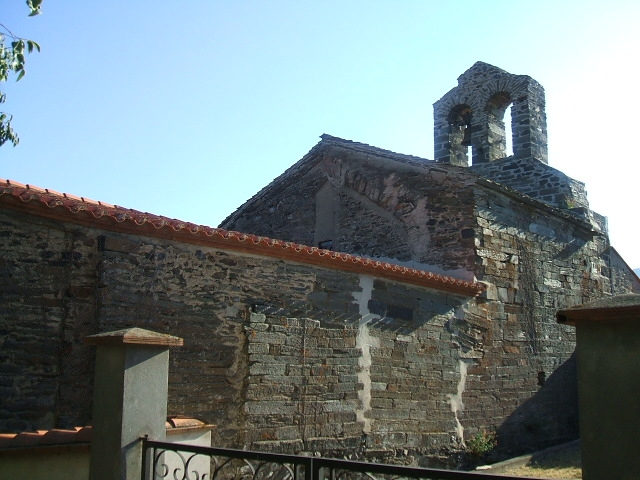
- The church of Saint-Martin, in Casefabre
- Location of Casefabre
- Location within France Location within Occitanie
- Coordinates: 42°37′01″N 2°36′56″E
- Country: France
- Region: Occitania
- Department: Pyrénées-Orientales
- Arrondissement: Prades
- Canton: Le Canigou
- Intercommunality: Roussillon Conflent

Government
  - Mayor (2025–2026): Nathan Moragas
- Area^{1}: 6.99 km^{2} (2.70 sq mi)
- Elevation: 557 m (1,827 ft)
- Highest elevation: 664 m (2,178 ft)
- Lowest elevation: 236 m (774 ft)
- Population (2023): 44
  - Density: 6.3/km^{2} (16/sq mi)
- Time zone: UTC+01:00 (CET)
  - Summer (DST): UTC+02:00 (CEST)
- INSEE/Postal code: 66040 /66130
- ^{1} French Land Register data, which excludes lakes, ponds, glaciers > 1 km^{2} (0.386 sq mi or 247 acres) and river estuaries.

Casefabre (French pronunciation: [kazfabʁ]; Catalan: Casafabre) is a commune in the Pyrénées-Orientales department in southern France.

== Geography ==
=== Localisation ===
Caramany is located in the canton of Le Canigou and in the arrondissement of Prades.

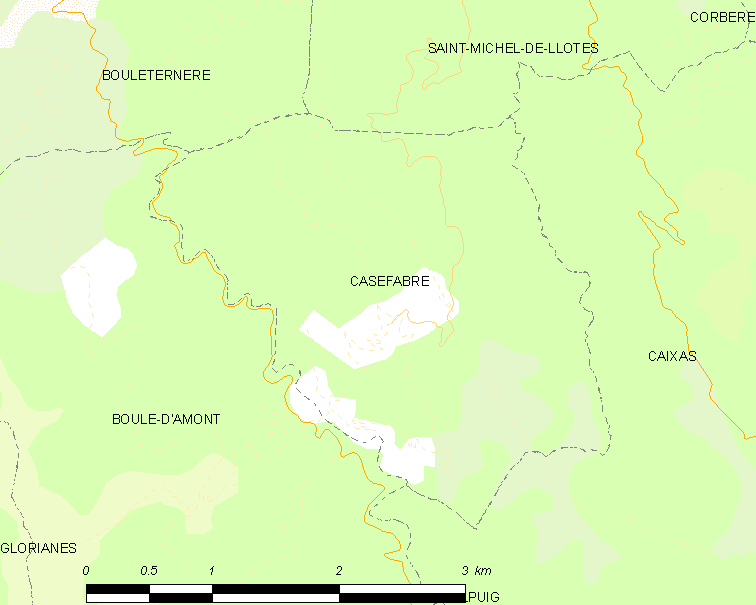
Map of Casefabre and its surrounding communes

== Population ==
Historical population
Year	Pop.	±% p.a.
1968	30	—
1975	31	+0.47%
1982	26	−2.48%
1990	30	+1.80%
1999	34	+1.40%
2007	35	+0.36%
2012	40	+2.71%
2017	40	+0.00%
2023	44	+1.60%
Source: INSEE

== See also ==
- Communes of the Pyrénées-Orientales department
