= Rodès =

Rodès Rodés
- Commune
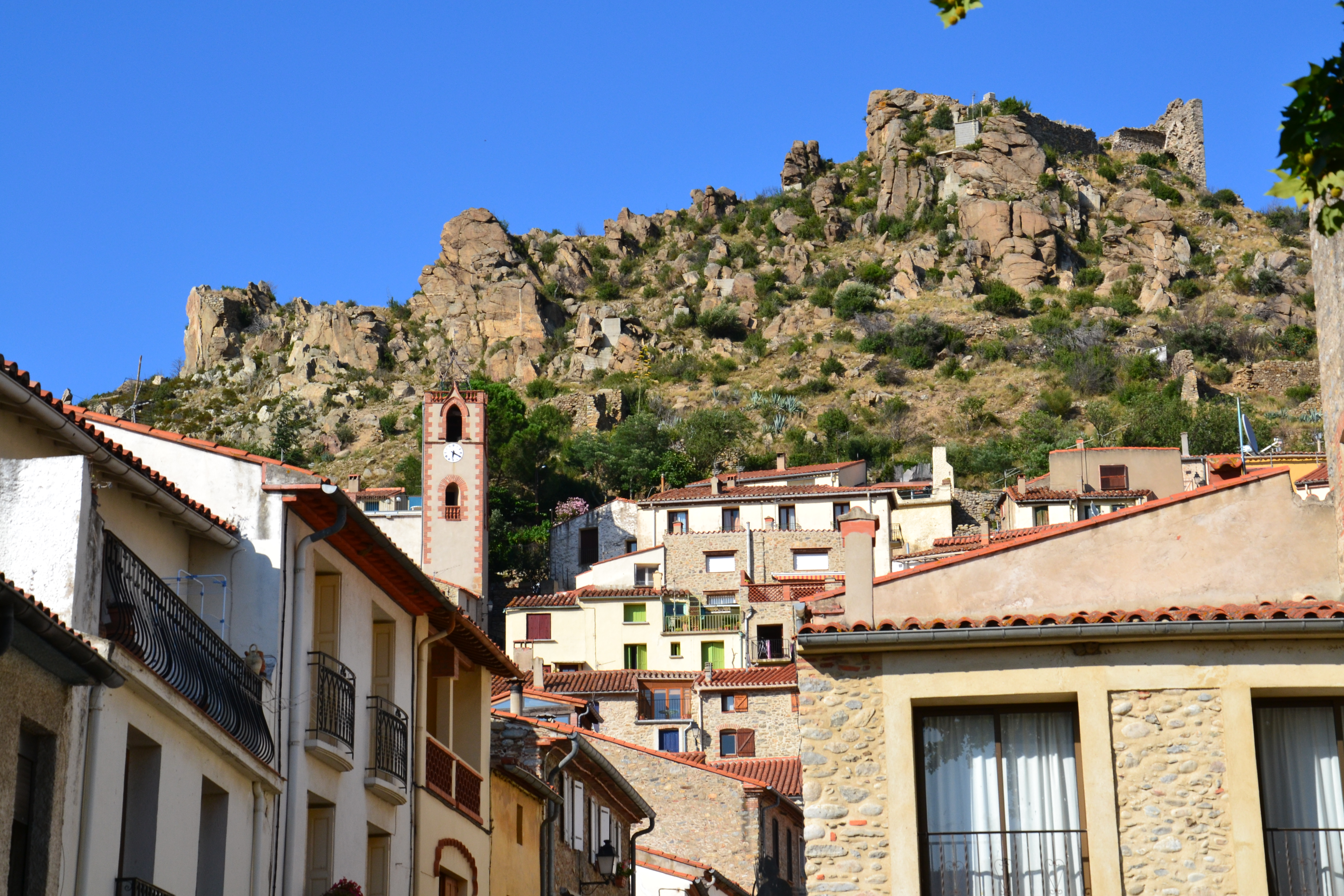
- A view within the village of Rodès

- Coat of arms
- Location of Rodès
- Location within France Location within Occitanie
- Coordinates: 42°39′29″N 2°33′44″E
- Country: France
- Region: Occitania
- Department: Pyrénées-Orientales
- Arrondissement: Prades
- Canton: Le Canigou
- Intercommunality: Roussillon Conflent

Government
  - Mayor (2020–2026): Marc Bianchini
- Area^{1}: 18.11 km^{2} (6.99 sq mi)
- Elevation: 200 m (660 ft)
- Highest elevation: 771 m (2,530 ft)
- Lowest elevation: 172 m (564 ft)
- Population (2023): 758
  - Density: 41.9/km^{2} (108/sq mi)
- Time zone: UTC+01:00 (CET)
  - Summer (DST): UTC+02:00 (CEST)
- INSEE/Postal code: 66165 /66320
- ^{1} French Land Register data, which excludes lakes, ponds, glaciers > 1 km^{2} (0.386 sq mi or 247 acres) and river estuaries.

Rodès (French pronunciation: [ʁɔdɛs]; Catalan: Rodès) is a commune in the Pyrénées-Orientales department in southern France.

== Geography ==
Rodès is in the canton of Le Canigou and in the arrondissement of Prades.

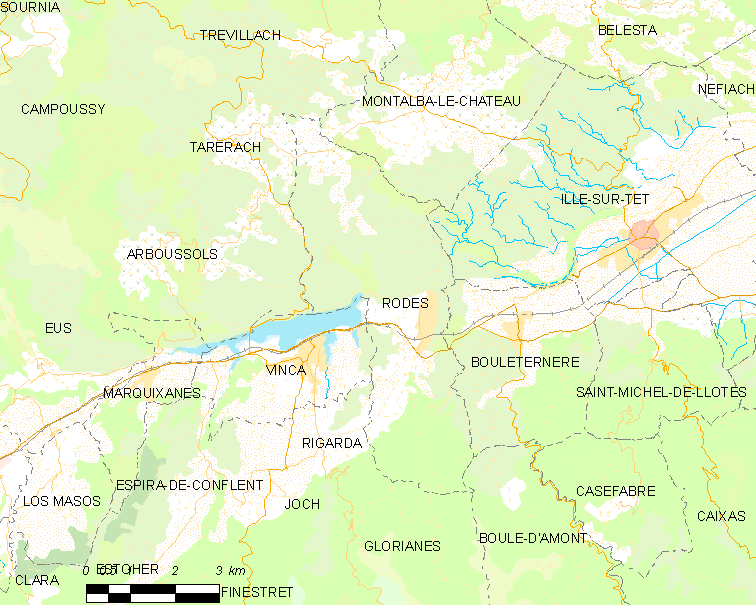
Map of Rodès and its surrounding communes

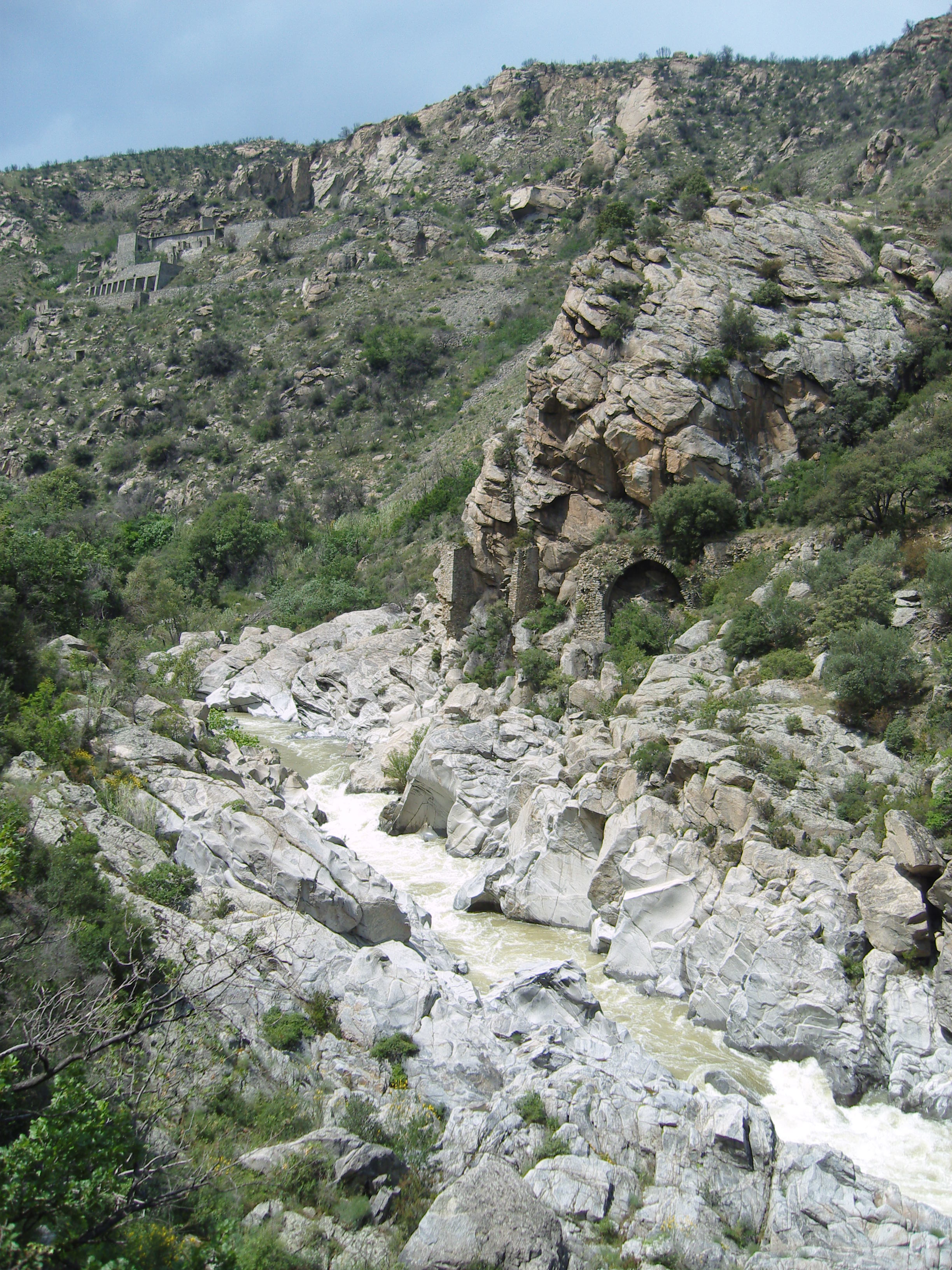
Guillera Gorge, Rodès. Here, the Têt river has carved a steep gorge in the granite of the Hercynian Millas pluton. The arch and other stone structures on the opposite side of the river formed part of a medieval canal which carried water to a palace in Perpignan.The arched structure top left was part of a large granite quarry (La Devesa) which operated in the first half of the 20th century.

== Population ==
Historical population
Year	Pop.	±% p.a.
1968	401	—
1975	340	−2.33%
1982	347	+0.29%
1990	407	+2.01%
1999	509	+2.52%
2007	597	+2.01%
2012	626	+0.95%
2017	619	−0.22%
2023	758	+3.43%
Source: INSEE

== See also ==
- Communes of the Pyrénées-Orientales department
- Saint-Felix of Ropidera Church
