= Gate of the Catalan Countries =

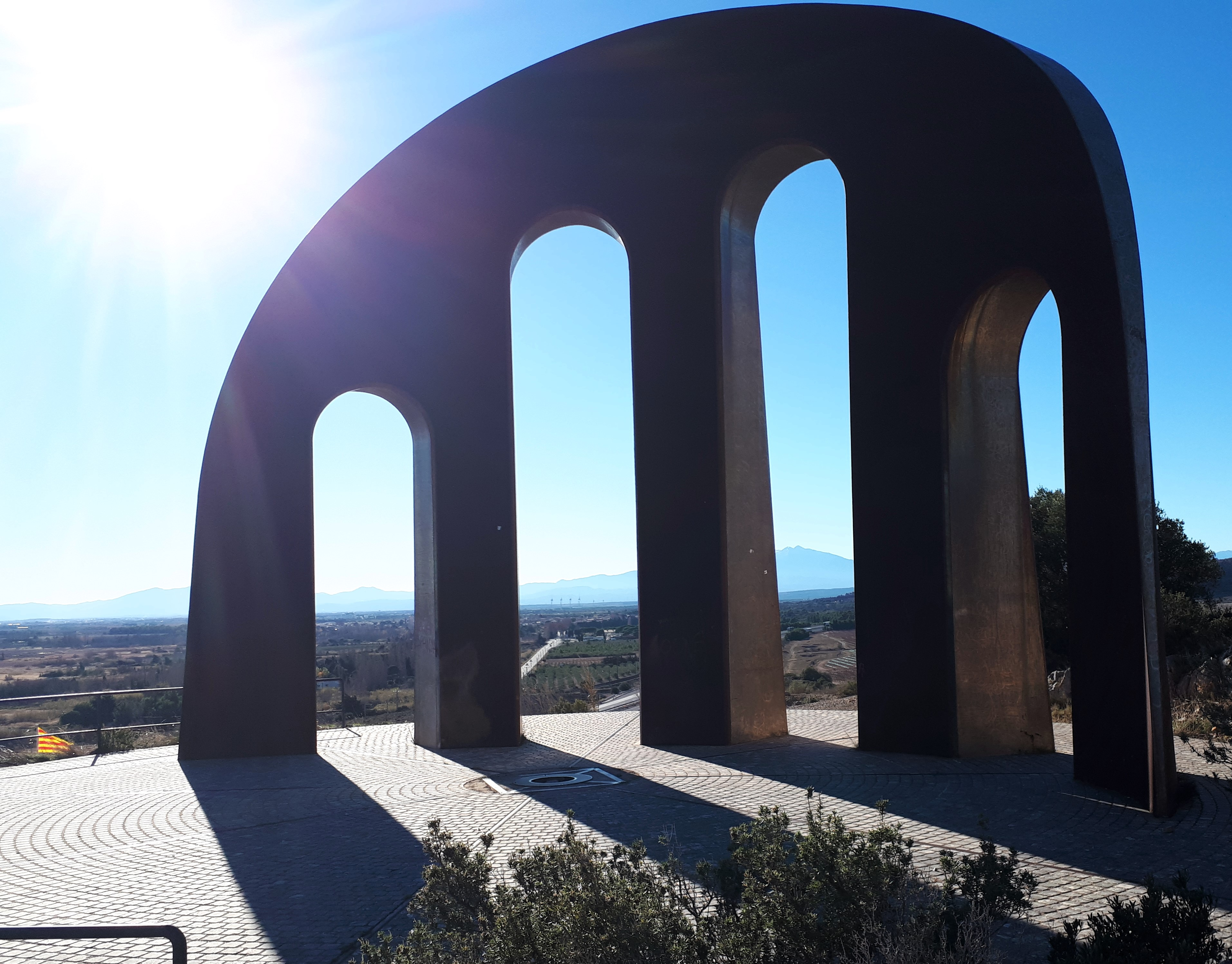
- Porta dels Països Catalans, view to the south-west
- Interactive map of the Gate of the Catalan Countries area

General information
- Type: Gate
- Location: Salses, France
- Coordinates: 42°51′15″N 2°56′16″E
- Construction started: 1368

Design and construction
- Architect: Emili Armengol

The Gate of the Catalan Countries (Catalan: Porta dels Països Catalans), a work of the sculptor Emili Armengol, marks the Northern starting location of the Catalan Countries in Salses, Pyrénées-Orientales (this part of France belongs to what is also called Catalunya Nord, English: Northern Catalonia).

After more than 20 years since the beginning of the project (often stopped, and even sometimes forbidden), it was finally inaugurated on September 28, 2003, being visible from the highway. Its conception and execution was in charge of the Union for the Catalan Region.

The aerial view of the monument reminds one of a sickle, in reference to the Els Segadors anthem.
