= Força Réal =

Mountain in France

Highest point
- Elevation: 507 m (1,663 ft)
- Coordinates: 42°43′38″N 2°42′01″E

Naming
- English translation: Royal Castle
- Language of name: Catalan

Geography
- Location: Pyrénées-Orientales, France
- Parent range: Pyrenees

Climbing
- Easiest route: Route départementale 38 (Pyrénées-Orientales)

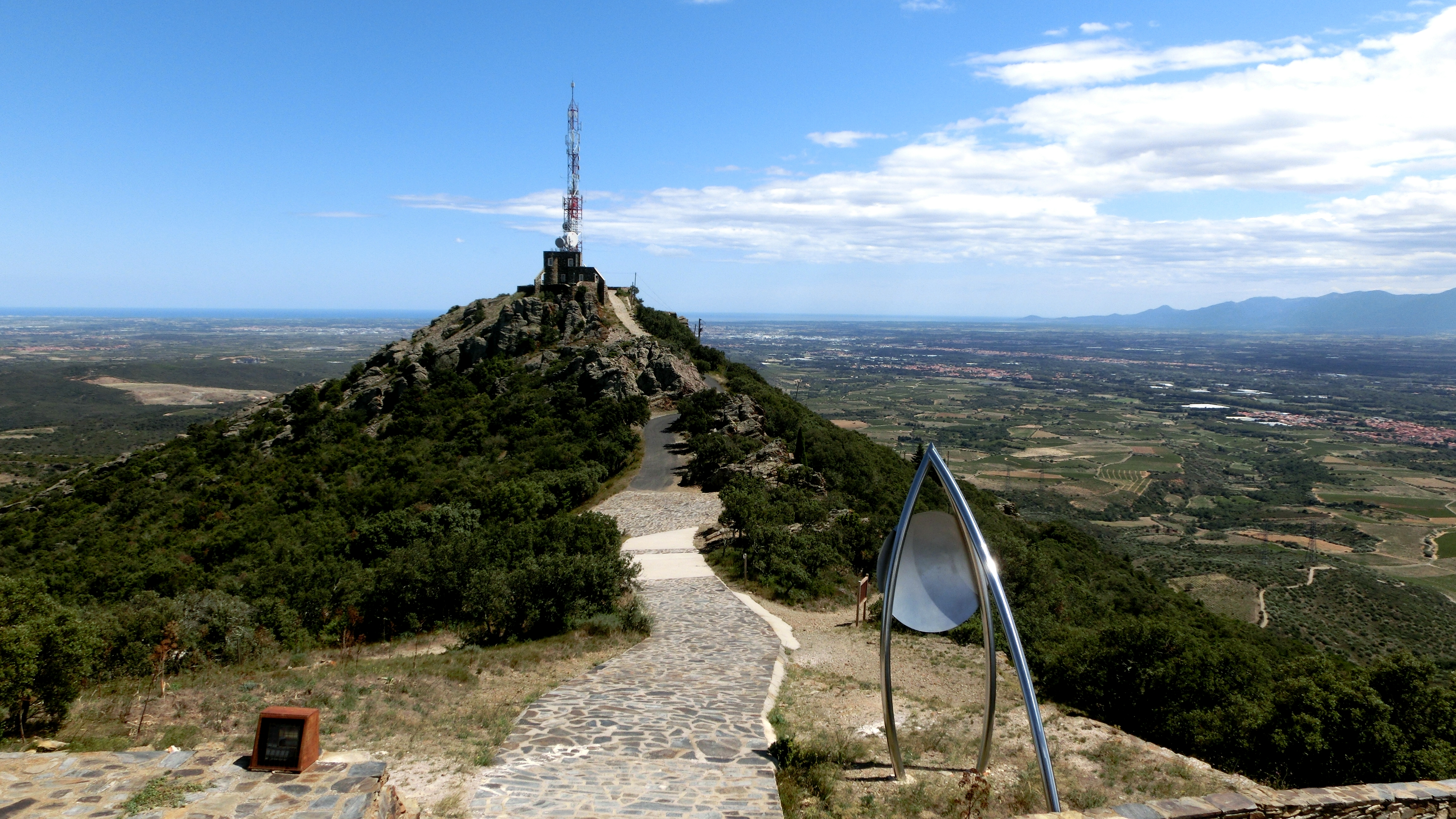
Peak with Radio mast

Força Réal is a rocky peak overlooking the region of Roussillon in Southern France. From the height of 507 metres, it has a view that stretches from the peak of the Canigou to the cape of Port-Vendres. From here, one can see the geographically contrasting valleys of the Agly and the Têt. It has been used historically as a lighthouse, on account of its unique shape and proximity to the ports of Roussillon.

== The Castle: The Royal Fortress ==
From the Treaty of Corbeil in 1258, the new rulers of Roussillon (the kings of Aragon and Majorca), built a castle which fell into the defense of the northern border of the region. It completed the line composed of the Château de Salses and Opoul among others. This castle was nicknamed "the Royal Castle", which the Catalans translated as "Força Real".

The estate was occupied in 1343 by King Pedro IV of Aragon the Ceremonious, which ended the kingdom of Mallorca. From the beginning of the fifteenth century the castle lost its importance. Its mission was to serve as lookout, the last mission before the Treaty of the Pyrenees dismantled it permanently.

In 1693, the castle and the tower were finally destroyed. It remains in ruins.

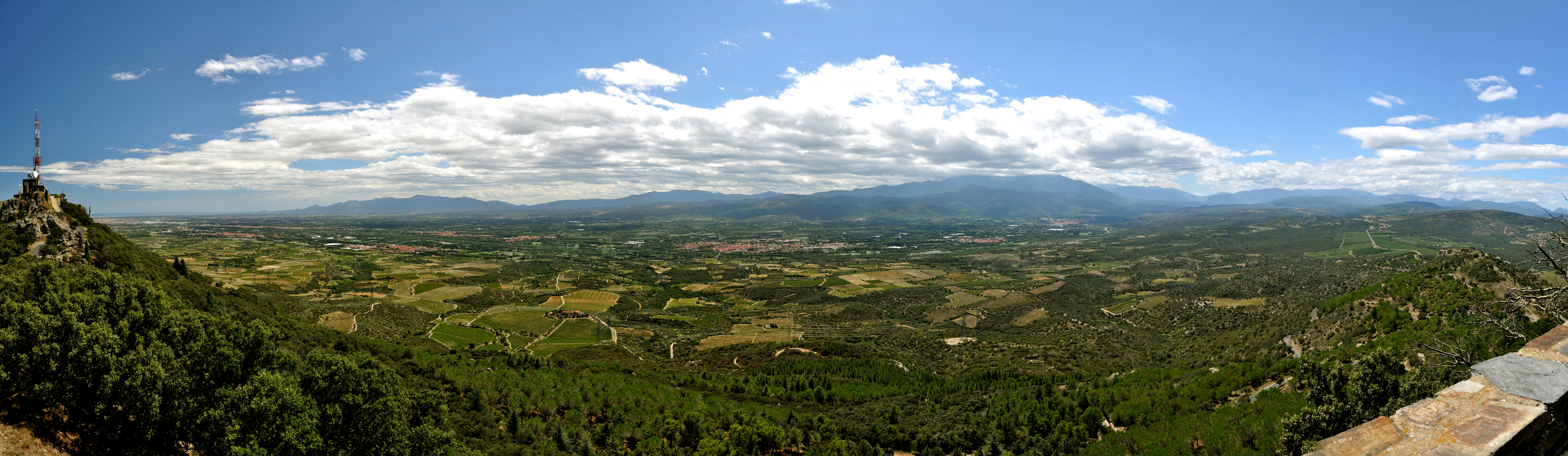
Panoramic view of Roussillon, seen from Força Réal, the Albera Massif mountain range and the Mediterranean Sea in the background
