= Saint-Félix de Ropidera Church =

Ruined church in Pyrénées-Orientales, France

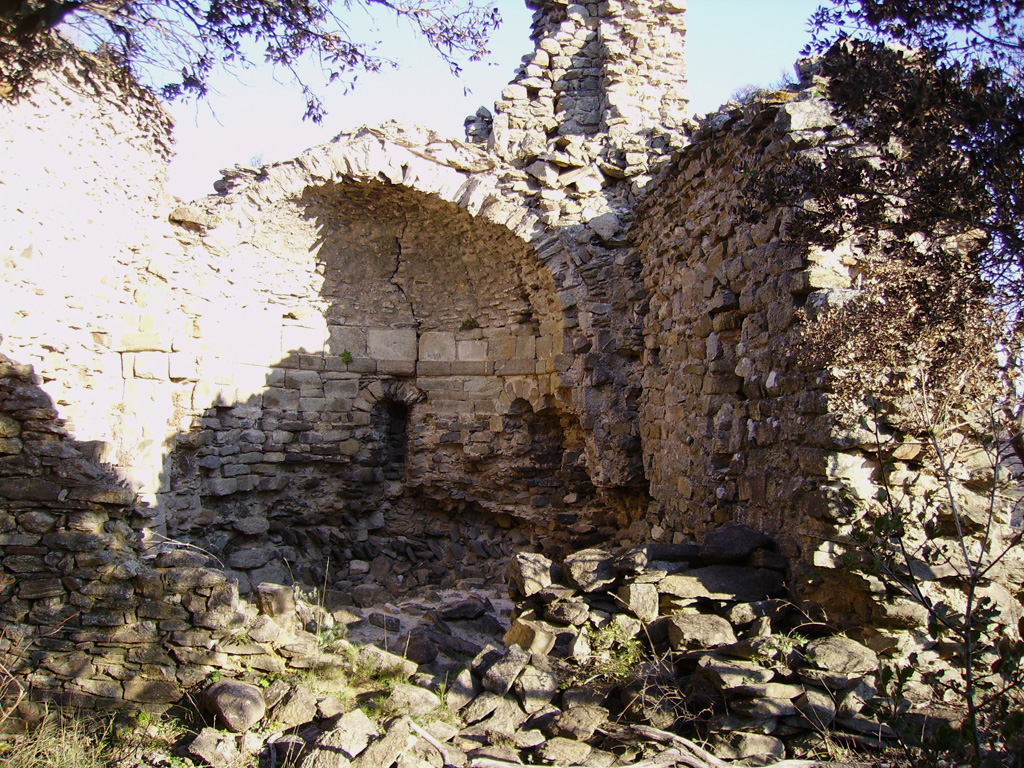

- Location within Occitanie

General information
- Type: Church
- Architectural style: Romanesque architecture
- Location: Pyrénées-Orientales
- Town or city: Rodès
- Country: France
- Coordinates: 42°39′57″N 02°32′31″E
- Completed: 12th century

The Saint-Félix de Ropidera Church (Catalan: Sant Feliu de Ropidera) is a ruined, fortified Romanesque church located in the deserted medieval village of Ropidera, in the commune of Rodès, in the French department of Pyrénées-Orientales.

Built in the 11th century, Saint-Félix church may have been abandoned as early as the 15th century, but remained the seat of a parish church until the 18th century.

Built on the steep ledges of a plateau overlooking the River Têt, Saint-Félix is fifteen meters long and five meters wide. The barrel vault of its single nave collapsed, as did part of the semi-dome vault of its apse, following the gradual abandonment of the village of Ropidera in the late Middle Ages.

The church's location, slightly south of the border between Spain and France established by the Treaty of Corbeil in 1258, led the authorities to build a high watchtower above its apse in the late 13th or early 14th century. A fifteen-metre-high corner of this tower remains.

== Location ==
The Ropidera plateau is part of the eastern foothills of the Pyrenees, in a hinge region between the Pyrenean mountains and the Mediterranean Roussillon plain. It overlooks the Têt valley on its left bank, just before the river enters the Roussillon plain. It is located entirely within the commune of Rodès, of which it constitutes approximately half the territory.

The village of Rodès is located in the valley on the banks of the Têt, with the rest of the commune on the right bank. Ropidera is located on the steep slope joining the valley to the plateau.

Saint-Félix church stands at the north-western end of the ruined medieval village of Ropidera, on the plateau of the same name, on a rise overlooking the village. (Note: Passarius & Catafau 2009, pp. 188, 189.) This arrangement of a church off-center from its village is unusual. (Note: Passarius & Catafau 2009, p. 195.)

== Toponymy ==
In Catalan, the name Félix is called Feliu. The former parish of Ropidera was also called Les Cases ("the houses"). These two names were sometimes Frenchized as Ropidère, Roupidère, Las Cazas, so that the church was sometimes called Saint-Félix de Roupidère, Saint-Félix de las Cazas or Sant Feliu de les Cases. (Note: The expression "de les" comes from Catalan, a language close to French, but in which the definite article "les", which is the plural of the feminine "la", does not contract when it follows the preposition "de".)

The church is dedicated to Saint Felix of Girona (or Félix l'Africain).

== Description ==
Saint-Félix church is a ruined building, 15 m long and 5 m wide, with a single nave, extended to the east by a semicircular apse.

The collapsed vault of the rectangular nave must have been barrel-vaulted. Access to the church was through a door in the south wall, which has completely collapsed. There may also have been another small door to the north. The nave is lit from the west by a small round-headed window. The nave was constructed from irregular stones, which may have been reinforced at the corners with larger, better-squared blocks.

The apse retains some of its arched roof. It has an east window and a south-east window, both round-headed. Above the windows, inside the apse, runs a 17 cm-high frieze in relief. The stonework consists of small rubble stones in the lower section, followed by larger, regular stones above the windows.

From the outside, the apse appears rectangular. It is a tower, of which the walls framing the apse and the fifteen-metre-high southeast corner remain. When this tower was built, the windows in the apse were blocked up. The tower could have been accessed via an entrance above the apse roof. It is not known whether access was possible from inside the church. (Note: Passarius & Catafau 2009, p. 190.) The height of the tower makes it visible from the Têt valley and Route Nationale 116.

To the north and west of the church is a six- to seven-metre-wide moat, and to the south and east is a 1.30-metre-thick wall. This protected area around the church may have been a defensive retreat or a fortified cemetery.

== History ==
Ropidera was mentioned in 955, then as a villa in 1011, suggesting that the site already had a church. However, the first text to mention the church of Saint-Félix dates from 1204. On balance, the present church seems to have been built in the 11th century, in the first half according to Catalunya romànica, or at the end of that century according to historian Géraldine Mallet.

In 1205, the church was one of several fiefdoms held by Pierre de Domanova for Guillaume, viscount of Castelnou. The church's name, Saint-Pierre et Saint-Félix, appeared in a 1356 text.

The tower overlooking the church was built around 1300, to serve as a watchtower against French incursions (Note: Passarius & Catafau 2009, p. 191.) following the 1258 Treaty of Corbeil, which brought the border between the Crown of Aragon and the Kingdom of France closer to Ropidera. Several later texts mention a castell (castle) in Ropidera, perhaps referring to this fortified church.

As early as 1381, the inhabitants complained of their extreme poverty. (Note: Passarius & Catafau 2009, p. 203.) The village was abandoned, probably in the course of the 15th century, although the land was still farmed. The church was no longer maintained from the 15th or early 16th century. In 1570, a parish priest was appointed to Saint-Pierre-et-Saint-Félix. On this occasion, a survey was carried out among the inhabitants of Vinça, who testified that the church was abandoned, disused and in ruins. (Note: Passarius & Catafau 2009, p. 204.) The chaplain was not obliged to reside in Ropidera, but was assigned to Vinça, where he worked on a daily basis. However, the parish church continued to provide income until the 18th century. (Note: Passarius & Catafau 2009, p. 205.)

== Bibliography ==
- Mallet, Géraldine (2003). Les Presses du Languedoc (ed.). Églises romanes oubliées Roussillon. Montpellier. ISBN 978-2-8599-8244-7.
- Calvet, Marc (2009). "Géomorphologie d'une montagne brûlée". Archéologie d'une montagne brûlée. ISBN 978-2849741016.
- Passarius, Olivier; Catafau, Aymat (2009). "Ropidera, le village médiéval". Archéologie d'une montagne brûlée.
- Bolòs i Masclans, Jordi; Ramos i Martínez, Maria-Lluïsa (1995). "Sant Feliu de Ropidera". In Fundació Enciclopèdia Catalana (ed.). Catalunya romànica (in Catalan). Vol. 7. Barcelona. p. 502. ISBN 84-77399-51-4.
