= Lac de Matemale =

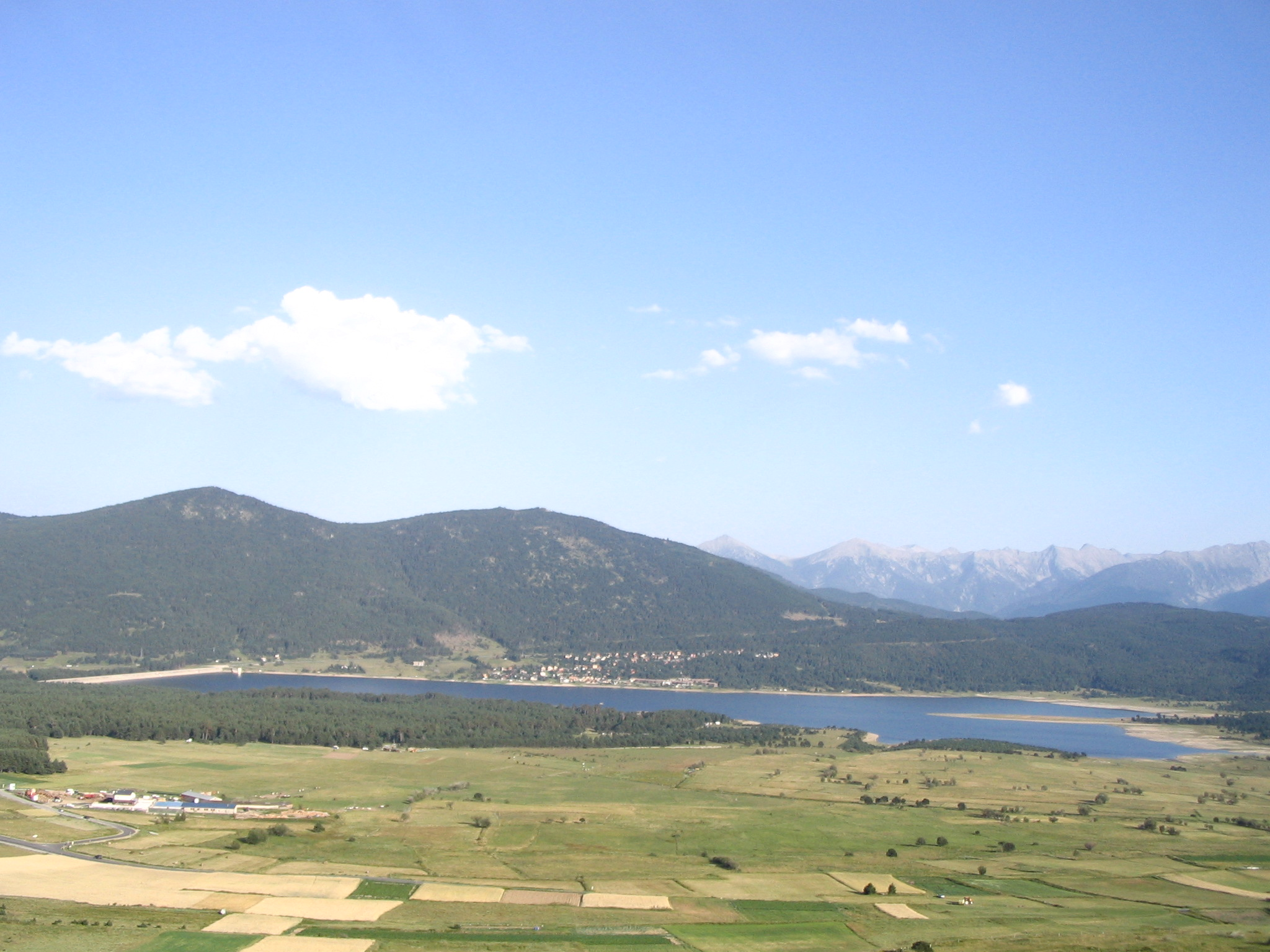

- Location within Pyrenees
- Location: Pyrénées-Orientales
- Coordinates: 42.569713°N 2.100406°E
- Type: reservoir
- Primary inflows: Aude
- Primary outflows: Aude
- Basin countries: France
- Max. length: 2.15 km (1.34 mi)
- Max. width: 1.27 km (0.79 mi)
- Surface area: 2.23 km^{2} (0.86 sq mi)
- Max. depth: 37 m (121 ft)
- Water volume: 20,500,000 m^{3} (720,000,000 cu ft)
- Surface elevation: 1,541 m (5,056 ft)

Lac de Matemale is an artificial lake in the commune of Matemale in the Pyrénées-Orientales, France. At an elevation of 1541 m, its surface area is 2.23 km^{2}.
