= Salses-le-Château =

- Commune
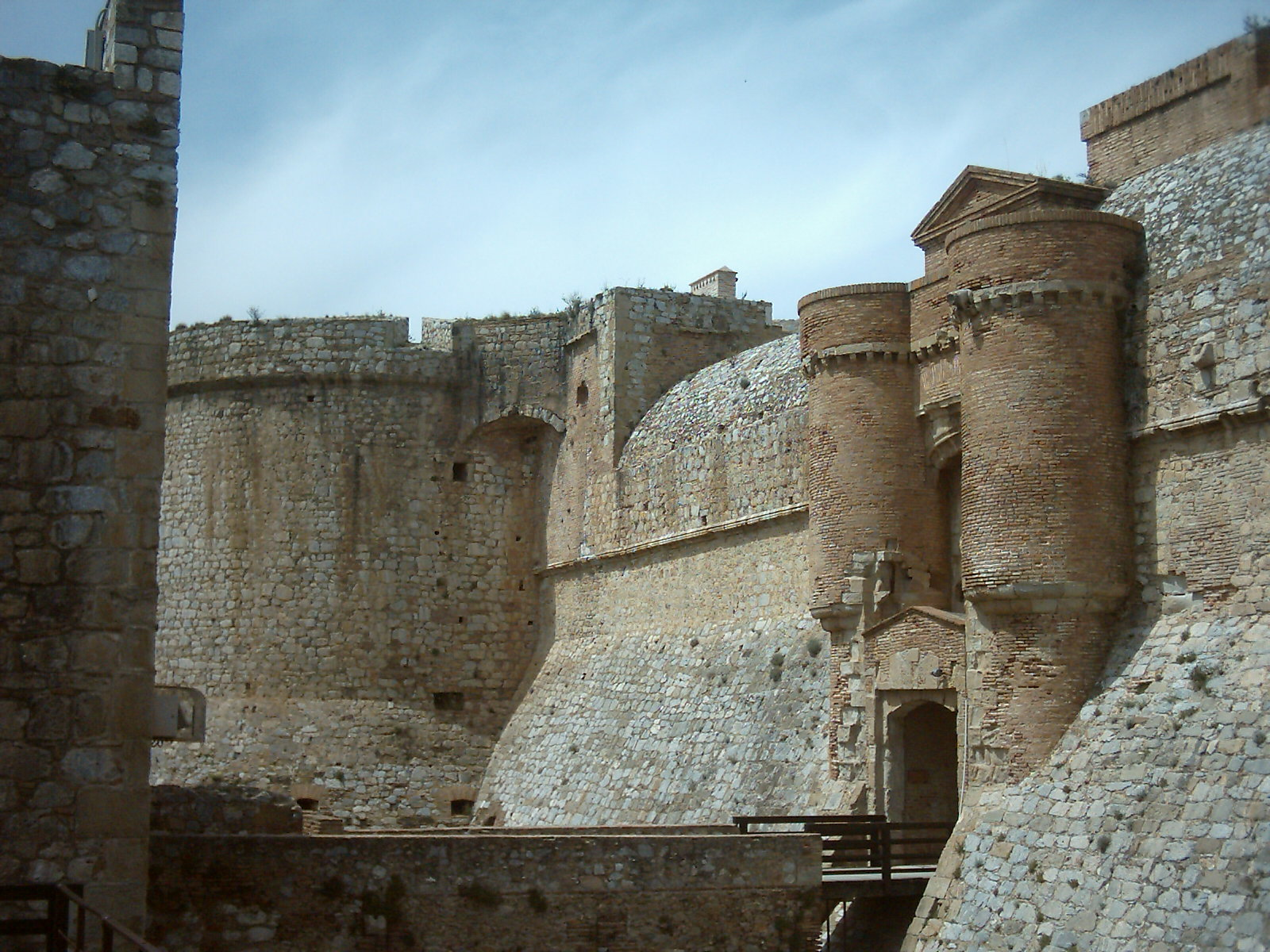
- Entrance of the Fort de Salses

- Coat of arms
- Location of Salses-le-Château
- Location within France Location within Occitanie
- Coordinates: 42°50′01″N 2°55′11″E
- Country: France
- Region: Occitania
- Department: Pyrénées-Orientales
- Arrondissement: Perpignan
- Canton: La Vallée de l'Agly
- Intercommunality: Corbières Salanque Méditerranée

Government
  - Mayor (2020–2026): Jean-Jacques Lopez
- Area^{1}: 71.28 km^{2} (27.52 sq mi)
- Elevation: 12 m (39 ft)
- Highest elevation: 354 m (1,161 ft)
- Lowest elevation: 0 m (0 ft)
- Population (2023): 3,965
  - Density: 55.63/km^{2} (144.1/sq mi)
- Time zone: UTC+01:00 (CET)
  - Summer (DST): UTC+02:00 (CEST)
- INSEE/Postal code: 66190 /66600
- ^{1} French Land Register data, which excludes lakes, ponds, glaciers > 1 km^{2} (0.386 sq mi or 247 acres) and river estuaries.

Salses-le-Château (French pronunciation: [sals lə ʃato]; Occitan: Salses lo Castèl; Catalan: Salses) or just Salses is a commune in the Pyrénées-Orientales department in southern France. It is located north of the city of Perpignan. It is traditionally considered as the northernmost point of the Catalan Countries (the lands in which Catalan language is spoken).

== Geography ==
Salses-le-Château is located in the canton of La Vallée de l'Agly and in the arrondissement of Perpignan.

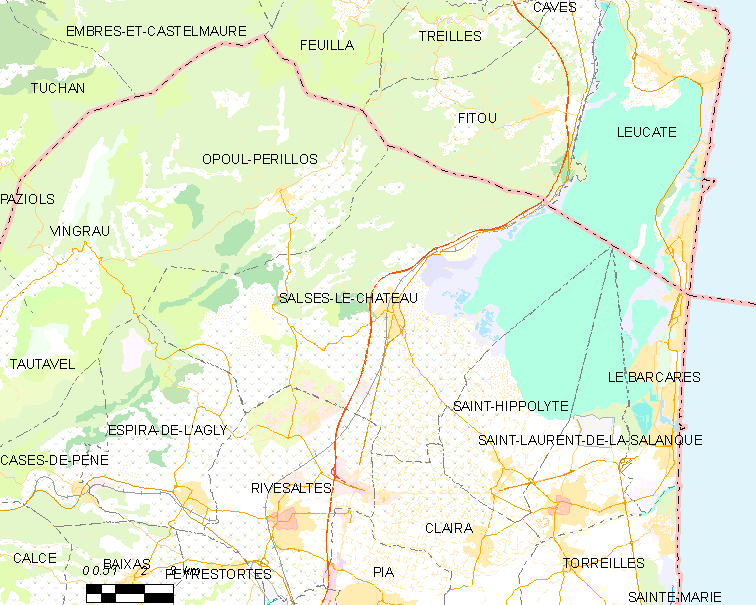
Map of Salses-le-Château and its surrounding communes

== Government and politics ==
=== Mayors ===
Mayor	Term start	Term end
Joseph Pams	1790	1792
Jean Vaquer	1792	1792
Thomas Pams	1792	1796
Marc Joseph Barthe	1796	1797
Jean Claret	1797	1799
Jean-Baptiste Lajou	1799	1802
Joseph Pams	1802	1803
Raphaël Vaquer	1803	1808
Bonaventure Vidal	1808	1811
Jacques Vidal	1811	1812
Joseph Pams	1812	1814
Marc Barthe	1814	1830
Jean Vidal-Estrade	1830	1843
Alexandre Barthe	1843	1848
Honoré Trilles	1848	1848
Joseph Castell	1848	1850
Joseph Bertrand	1850	1851
Jean Vidal-Estrade	1851	1851
Gaspard Daudiès	1851	1855
François Castell-Ayrolles	1855	1858
André Baron	1858	1861
Bonaventure Vidal-Angles	1861	1870
Joseph Castell	1870	1871
Bonaventure Vidal-Angles	1871	1876
Joseph Lanes-Claret	1876	1877
Laurent Calmon	1877	1878
Adolphe Cambriels	1878	1878
Jean Baron-Castany	1878	1896
Frédéric Parazols	1896	1900
Ernest Castell-Forner	1900	1905
Paul Crouzet	1905	1906
François Montagne	1906	1914
François Carrère	1914	1917
François Montagne	1917	1919
Fernand Brégoulat	1919	1941
Jean Tardiu	1941	1942
Alphonse Barrau	1942	1944
Jean Torrent	1944	1947
Arthur Conte	1947	1972
René Comes	1972	1989
Marie-Claude Grégoire	1989	1995
Sylvain Dagues	1995	2001
Marie-Claude Grégoire	2001	2008
Jean-Jacques Lopez	2008	

== Population ==
Historical population
Year	Pop.	±% p.a.
1968	2,009	—
1975	2,053	+0.31%
1982	2,098	+0.31%
1990	2,422	+1.81%
1999	2,513	+0.41%
2007	2,827	+1.48%
2012	3,227	+2.68%
2017	3,501	+1.64%
2023	3,965	+2.10%
Source: INSEE

== Sites of interest ==
- Fort de Salses
- The Gate of the Catalan Countries is located in Salses.

== See also ==
- Communes of the Pyrénées-Orientales department
