= Casteilla =

Lake in Pyrénées-Orientales, France

- Estany del Castellar
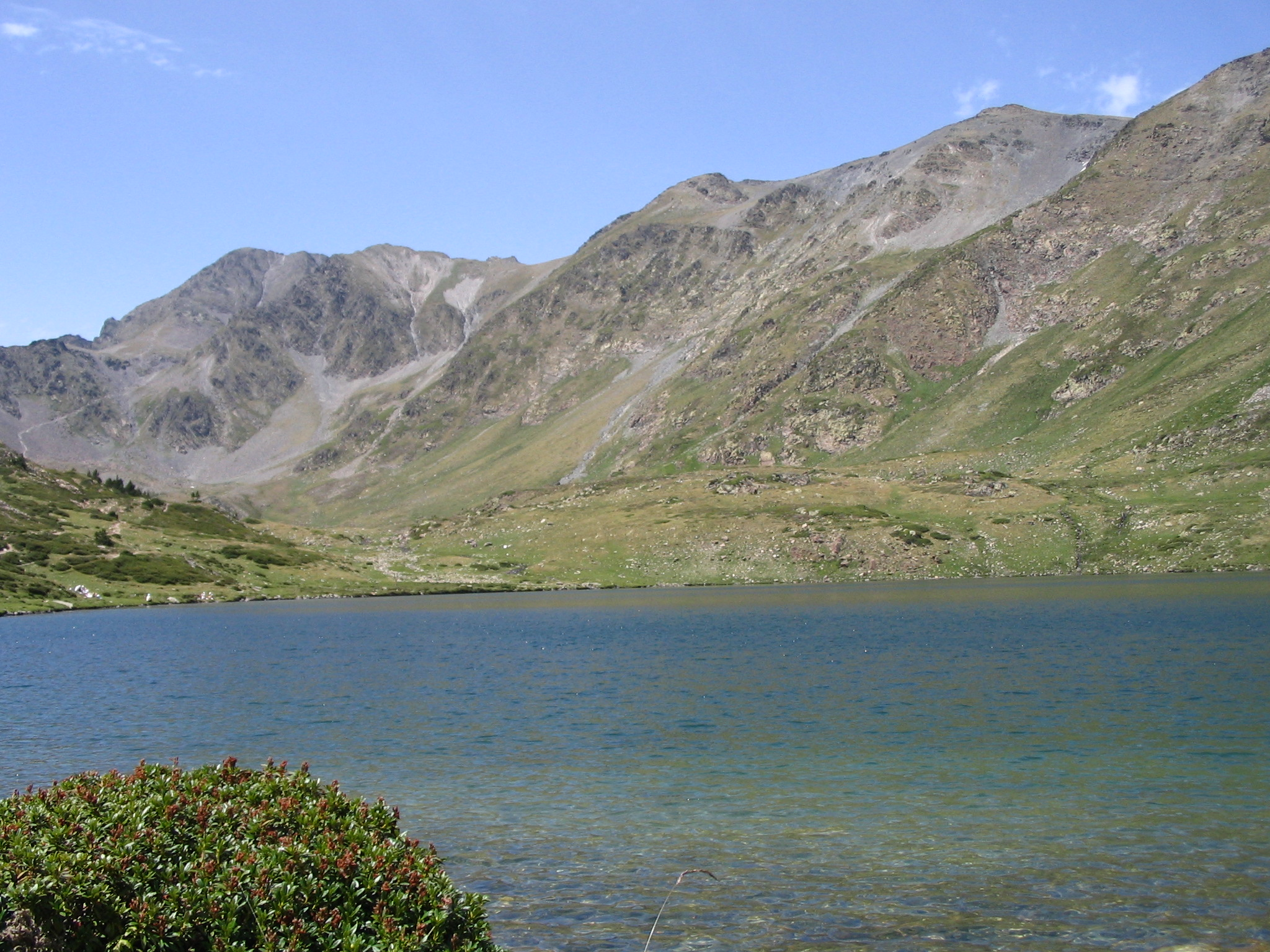

- Location within Pyrenees
- Location: Pyrénées-Orientales, Pyrénées
- Coordinates: 42.578056°N 1.967497°E
- Basin countries: France
- Surface area: 0.05 km^{2} (0.019 sq mi)
- Surface elevation: 2,280 m (7,480 ft)

Casteilla or Estany del Castellar is a lake in Pyrénées-Orientales, Pyrénées, France. At an elevation of 2280 m, its surface area is 0.05 km^{2}.
