= Fort de Salses =

Fortress in France

Coordinates: 42°50′23″N 2°55′06″E

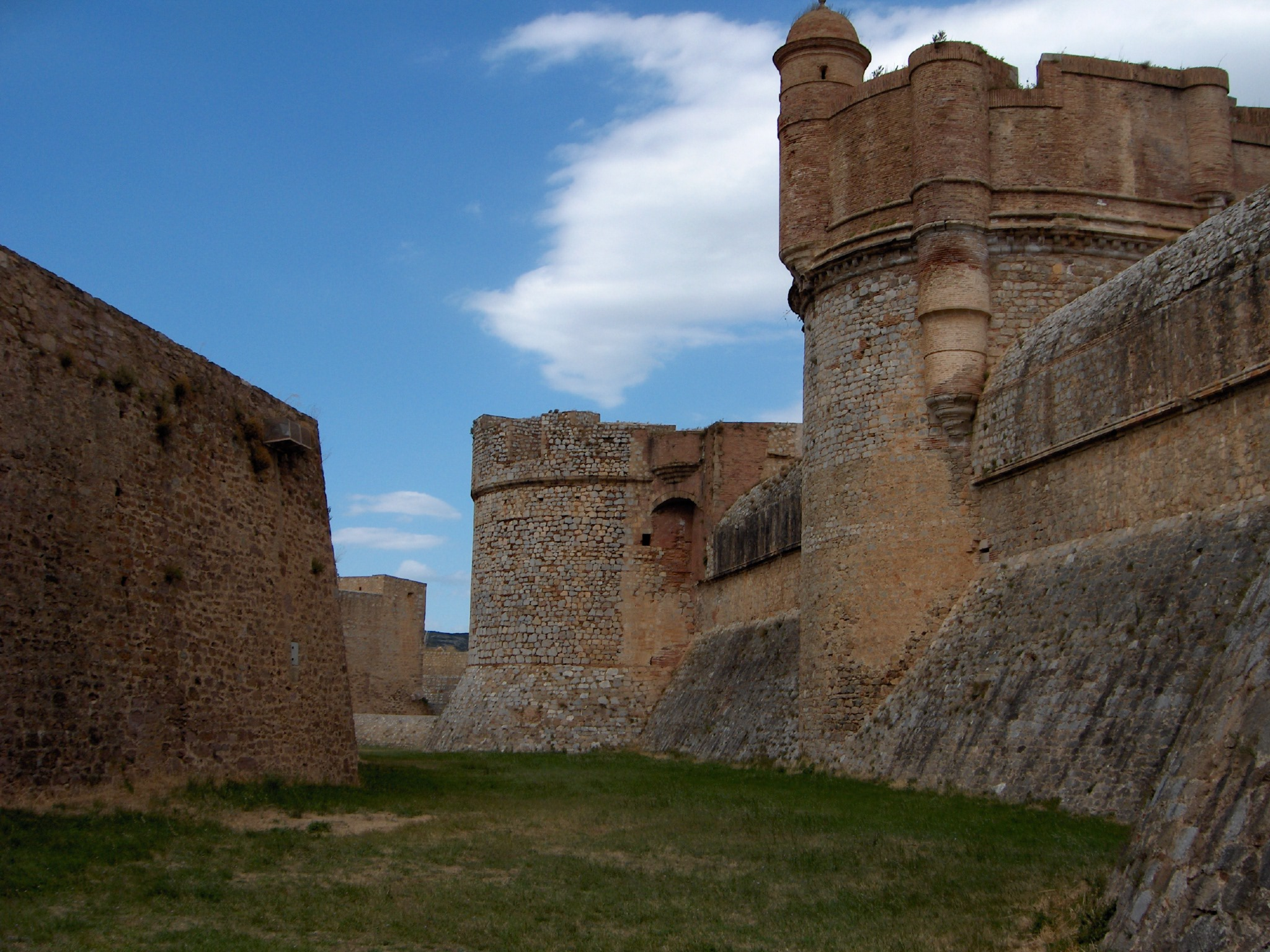
Moat and ramparts

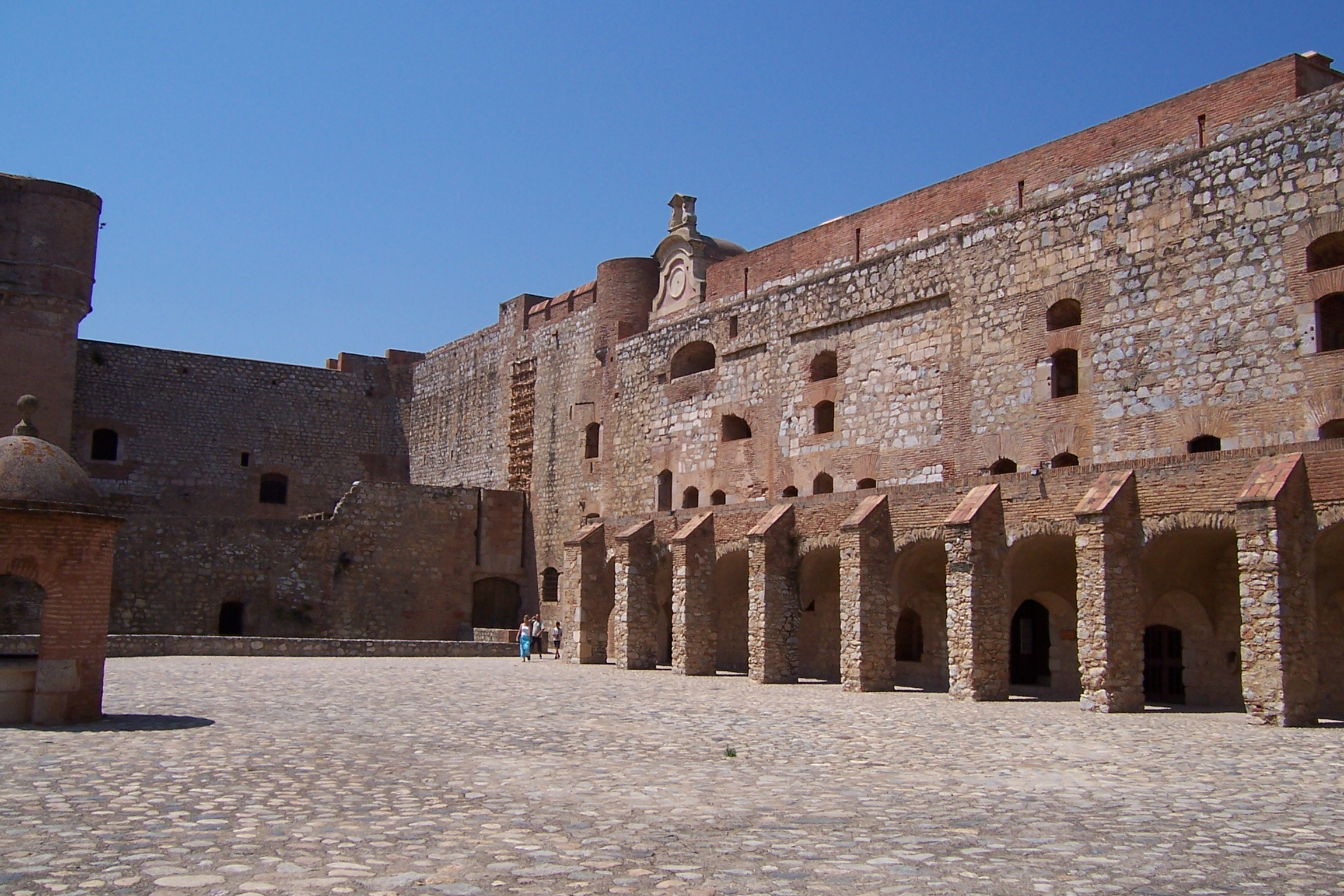
Inner courtyard

The Fort de Salses (also called Forteresse de Salses) is a Catalan fortress in the commune of Salses-le-Château, situated in the French département of Pyrénées-Orientales. It is clearly visible from the A9 autoroute as well as the train line between Perpignan and Narbonne and it is possible to visit from the motorway rest area and the local train station.

Built by the Crown of Aragon at the end of the 15th century, the fortress guarded the former frontier between Principality of Catalonia and the Kingdom of France. Its layout and architecture, innovative for the time, present a rare example of the transition between medieval castle and the fortresses of the modern period.
The fort was captured by the French in 1642, and remained French after the Treaty of the Pyrenees.

Fort de Salses is listed as a monument historique by the French Ministry of Culture, and is operated by the Centre des monuments nationaux. The fortress receives 100,000 visitors a year.

During the Spanish Civil War, the fort was used as a refuge.

== See also ==
- List of castles in France
