= Pyrénées-Orientales =

Department of France in Occitania

Pyrénées-Orientales Pirineus Orientals (Catalan) Pirenèus Orientals (Occitan)
- Department of France
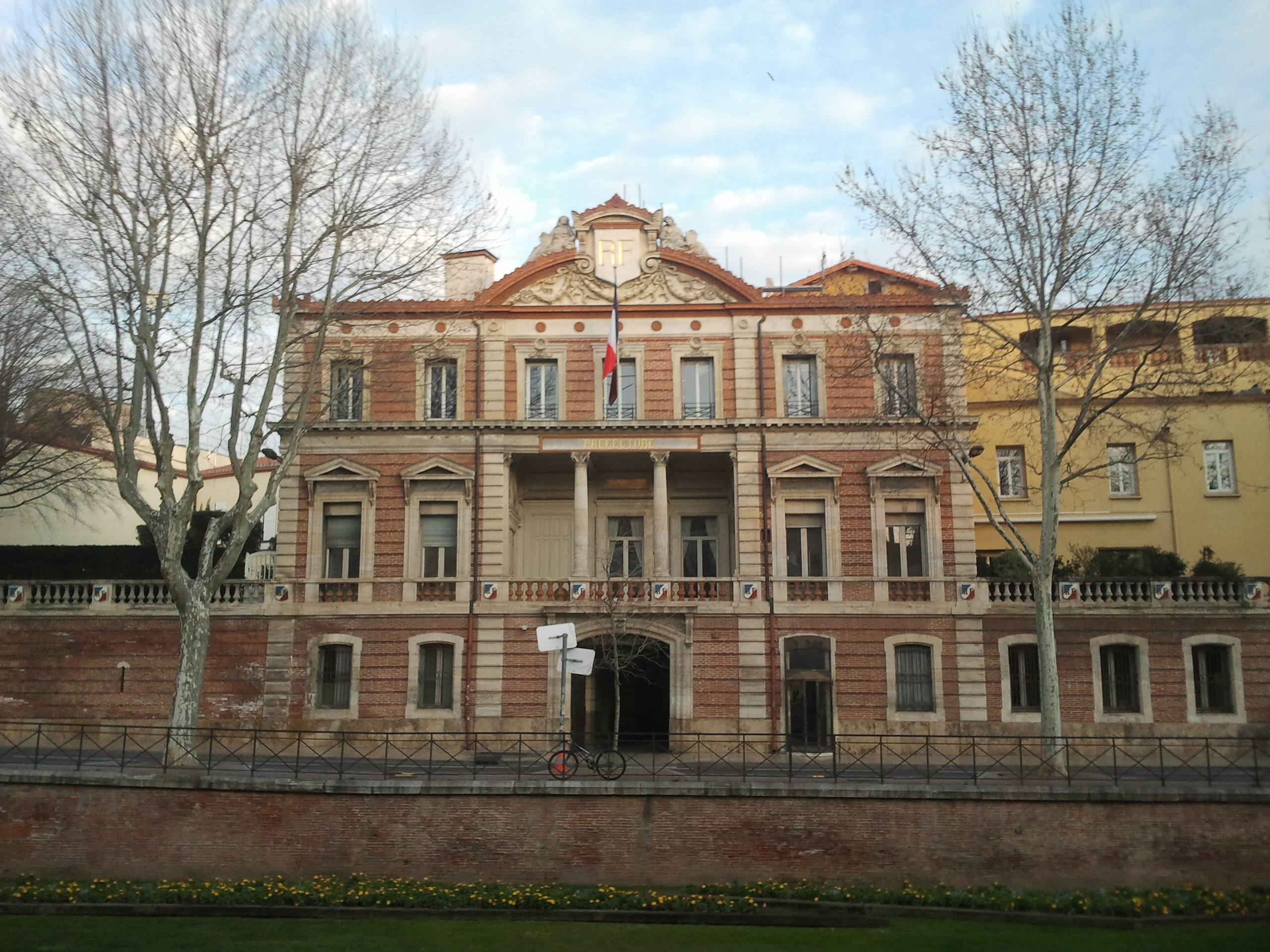
- Prefecture building of the Pyrénées-Orientales department, in Perpignan

- Flag

- Location of Pyrénées-Orientales in France
- Coordinates: 42°30′N 2°45′E
- Country: France
- Region: Occitania
- Established: 9 February 1790
- Prefecture: Perpignan
- Subprefectures: Céret; Prades

Government
  - President of the Departmental Council: Hermeline Malherbe-Laurent (PS)

Area^{1}
  - Total: 4,116 km^{2} (1,589 sq mi)

Population (2023)
  - Total: 496,855
  - Rank: 54th
  - Density: 120.7/km^{2} (312.6/sq mi)
- Time zone: UTC+1 (CET)
  - Summer (DST): UTC+2 (CEST)
- Department number: 66
- Arrondissements: 3
- Cantons: 17
- Communes: 226
- ^1 French Land Register data, which exclude estuaries, and lakes, ponds, and glaciers larger than 1 km^{2}

Pyrénées-Orientales (French: [piʁene ɔʁjɑ̃tal]; Catalan: Pirineus Orientals [piɾiˈnɛwz uɾiənˈtals]; Occitan: Pirenèus Orientals [piɾeˈnɛwz uɾjenˈtals]; lit. 'Eastern Pyrenees'), also known as Northern Catalonia, is a department of the region of Occitania, Southern France, adjacent to the northern Spanish frontier and the Mediterranean Sea. It borders the departments of Ariège to the northwest and Aude to the north, the Mediterranean Sea to the east and the Spanish province of Girona in Catalonia to the south and the country of Andorra to the west. It also surrounds the tiny Spanish exclave of Llívia, and thus has two distinct borders with Spain. In 2023, it had a population of 496,855. Some parts of the Pyrénées-Orientales (like the Cerdagne) are part of the Iberian Peninsula. It is named after the Pyrenees mountain range. Historically, most of the department corresponds with the northern part of the medieval and early modern Principality of Catalonia.

== History ==
Prior to the Treaty of the Pyrenees in 1659, most of the present department was part of the former Principality of Catalonia, within the Crown of Aragon, therefore part of the Monarchy of Spain, so the majority of it has historically been Catalan-speaking, and it is still referred to as Northern Catalonia.

The modern department was created early during the French Revolution on 9 February 1790 under the name of Roussillon, also the name of the pre-Revolutionary province of Roussillon to which it almost exactly corresponds, although the department also includes Fenouillèdes, a small piece of territory which had formerly been on the southern edge of Languedoc. The name therefore changed, on 26 February 1790, to Pyrénées-Orientales.

Invaded by Spain in April 1793, the area was recaptured thirteen months later during the War of the Roussillon.

During the nineteenth century, Pyrénées-Orientales proved one of the most consistently republican departments in France. The intellectual and republican politician François Arago, who, during the early months of the short-lived Second Republic in 1848, was briefly de facto Head of state, came from Estagel in the east of the department.

== Geography ==
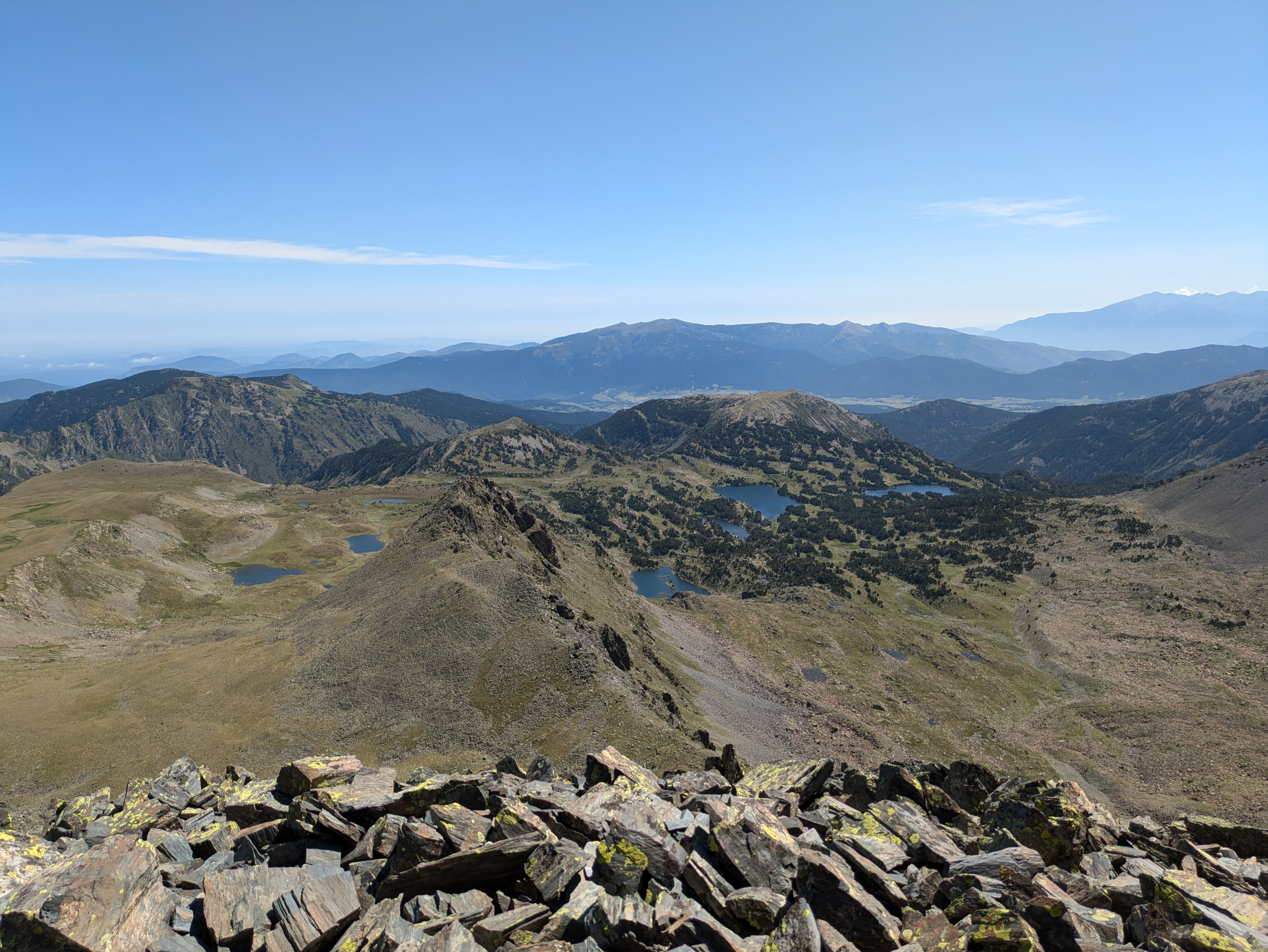
View looking east from the border with Ariège across mountains and lakes of the Pyrénées-Orientales.

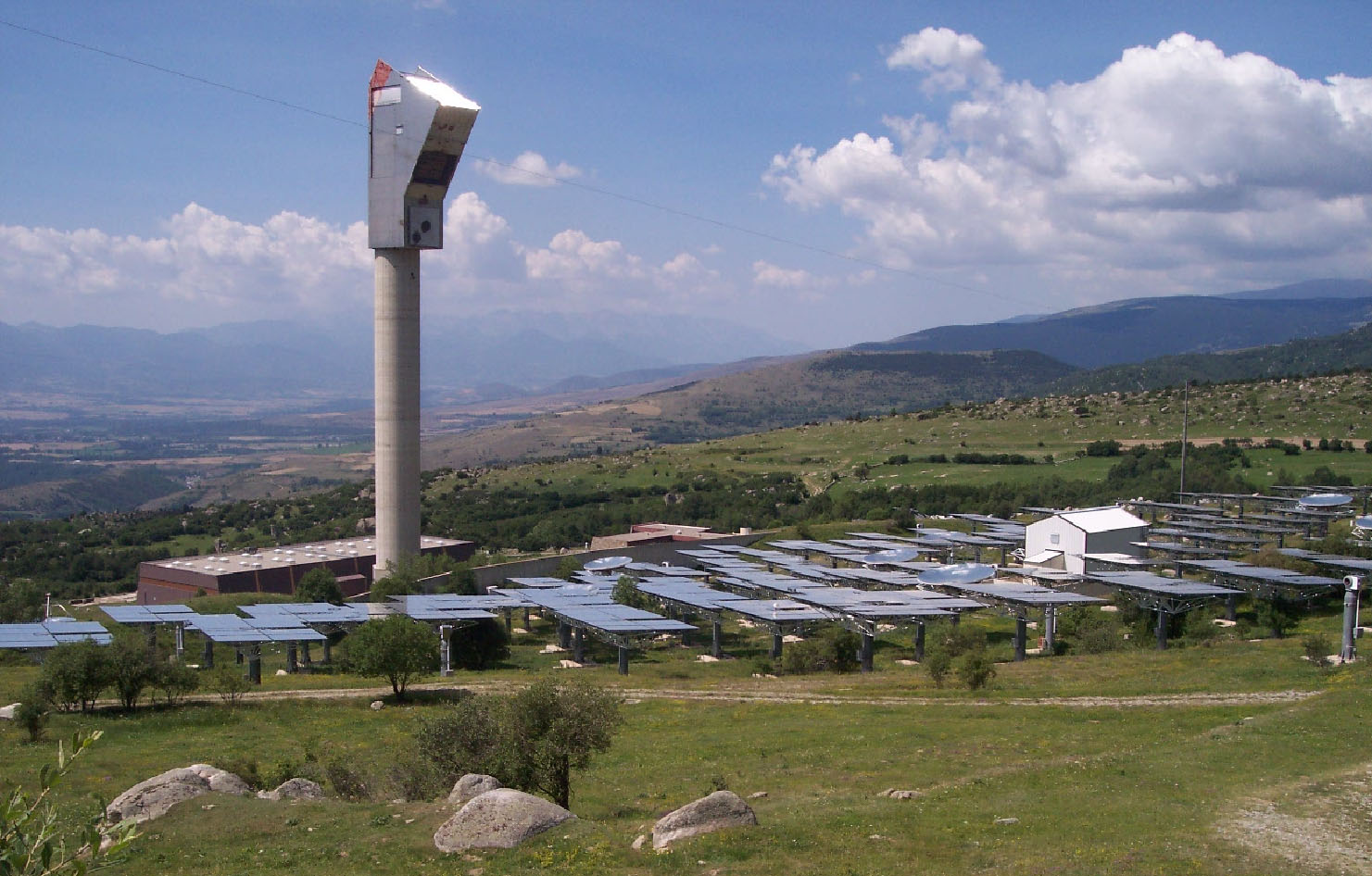
The Themis Solar Power tower

Pyrénées-Orientales has an area of 4,115 km^{2}. It consists of three river valleys in the Pyrenees mountain range – from north to south, those of the Agly, Têt and Tech – and the eastern Plain of Roussillon into which they converge. Most of the population and agricultural production are concentrated in the plain, with only 30% of the area. There is one water reservoir at Lac de Matemale. There is also a lake, Casteilla.

It is one of the rare French departments (with the Alpes-Maritimes, Pyrénées-Atlantiques, Aude and Corsica) which allow their inhabitants and tourists to enjoy both the mountains and the sea.

The upper Têt valley comprises the department's westernmost third, with just over a tenth of the total population. To the south-east, the Tech valley and the Côte Vermeille contain nearly 100,000 inhabitants. The Agly basin in the north-east has much in common with neighboring areas of Aude. Llívia is a town of Cerdanya, province of Girona, Catalonia, Spain, that forms a Spanish exclave surrounded by French territory.

=== Principal towns ===
The most populous commune is Perpignan, the prefecture, home to about one-quarter of the inhabitants of Pyrénées-Orientales. As of 2023, there were seven communes with more than 10,000 inhabitants:

Commune	Population (2023)
Perpignan	121,616
Canet-en-Roussillon	13,227
Saint-Cyprien	12,068
Saint-Estève	11,630
Pia	11,615
Argelès-sur-Mer	10,616
Cabestany	10,465

They are followed in decreasing order by Saint-Laurent-de-la-Salanque, Elne, Rivesaltes, Thuir, Le Soler, Bompas, Céret and Toulouges, each of 7–10,000 inhabitants.

== Economy ==
Pyrénées-Orientales is a wine-growing area and a tourist destination.

== Demographics ==
The city of Perpignan (122,000 inhabitants) constitutes more than a quarter of the department's population by itself, and more than half if one includes its suburbs. It is the only important town, and only the towns of Canet-en-Roussillon, Saint-Estève, Saint-Cyprien, Argelès-sur-Mer, Cabestany and Saint-Laurent-de-la-Salanque exceed 10,000 inhabitants. Other important towns are Rivesaltes, Bompas, Pia, Thuir, Céret, Elne, Le Soler, Prades and Toulouges, each with between 6,500 and 10,000 inhabitants. The arrondissement of Perpignan, with 289,110 inhabitants in 2020, is the one with the most inhabitants in the department. Indeed, the other two, the arrondissements of Céret and Prades, have respectively 133,405 inhabitants and 60,250 inhabitants.

The distribution by age groups shows a relatively high number of people aged 60 and over (29% of the population compared to 21.3% for the whole of France).

This aging of the population results in a mortality rate higher than that of births. However, the population has been increasing steadily for several decades thanks to a clearly positive migratory balance. The department particularly attracts retirees thanks to its pleasant climate, which contributes to both the increase in the population and its aging.

Population development since 1793:

Historical population

Year	Pop.	±% p.a.
1793	105,171	—
1801	110,732	+0.65%
1806	126,692	+2.73%
1821	143,054	+0.81%
1831	157,052	+0.94%
1841	173,592	+1.01%
1851	181,955	+0.47%
1861	181,763	−0.01%
1872	191,856	+0.49%
1881	208,855	+0.95%
1891	210,125	+0.06%
1901	212,121	+0.09%
1911	212,986	+0.04%
1921	217,503	+0.21%

Year	Pop.	±% p.a.
1931	238,647	+0.93%
1936	233,347	−0.45%
1946	228,776	−0.20%
1954	230,285	+0.08%
1962	251,231	+1.09%
1968	281,976	+1.94%
1975	299,506	+0.87%
1982	334,557	+1.59%
1990	363,796	+1.05%
1999	392,803	+0.86%
2007	437,157	+1.35%
2012	457,793	+0.93%
2017	474,452	+0.72%
2023	496,855	+0.77%

French is spoken by almost the entire population. Minority languages in the region are Catalan and Occitan, which between them are estimated to be spoken by 34% of the population and understood by an additional 21%.

On 10 December 2007, the Departmental Council of Pyrénées-Orientales recognized Catalan as a regional language of the department, though French is still the only official language in France, according to the Constitution.

The area is traditionally divided into comarques, of which five (French Cerdagne, Capcir, Conflent, Roussillon and Vallespir) are historically Catalan-speaking and one (Fenouillèdes) is historically Occitan-speaking. The five Catalan-speaking comarques were historically part of the Kingdom of Majorca.

== Administration ==
The département is managed by the Departmental Council of Pyrénées-Orientales in Perpignan. The Pyrénées-Orientales is part of the region of Occitanie. The Departmental Council of Pyrénées-Orientales is more and more involved with the European Union to create, together with the Generalitat of Catalonia and Andorra, a Eurodistrict.

=== Politics ===
==== Departmental Council of Pyrénées-Orientales ====
The Departmental Council of Pyrénées-Orientales has 34 seats. In the 2015 departmental elections, the Socialist Party (PS) won 17 seats, The Republicans (LR) won 12 seats and the French Communist Party (PCF) won 5 seats. Hermeline Malherbe-Laurent (PS) has been President of the Departmental Council since 2010.

==== Members of the National Assembly ====
Pyrénées-Orientales elected the following members of the National Assembly during the 2022 legislative election:

Constituency	Member	Party
Pyrénées-Orientales's 1st constituency	Sophie Blanc	National Rally
Pyrénées-Orientales's 2nd constituency	Anaïs Sabatini	National Rally
Pyrénées-Orientales's 3rd constituency	Sandrine Dogor-Such	National Rally
Pyrénées-Orientales's 4th constituency	Michèle Martinez	National Rally

==== Renaming ====
There is a debate in the departement around its renaming due to the lack of identification with the Catalan identity of the territory on its current name, as well as the geographic ambiguity that expresses. The Departamental Council will hold a consultation in November 2025 to ask the population about different options of rename it, the most popular among them being "Pays Catalan" and "Pyrénées Catalanes", according to an online poll.

== Cuisine ==
The cuisine of Pyrénées-Orientales draws naturally from the historical Catalan presence in the area, so dishes like paella, caragols a la llauna and calçots are prevalent in the restaurants, especially at important dates such as the various saints' feast days and cultural festivals.

The area is famous for its wine with the predominantly red grape varieties grown all over the department, regional specialities such as muscat de Rivesaltes and Banyuls are sold everywhere in the department.

The geography of the area leads to a distinct divide in the cuisine of P-O. The mountainous area to the south has dishes using ingredients that grow naturally there, products such as olives and goat's cheese.

Fish are also very popular in the region, with Collioure being famous for its anchovies. However, fishing has declined due to the overall reduction of the fish stock in the Mediterranean sea.

== Culture ==
Places of interest include:

- Banyuls-sur-Mer, famous for its Grenache-based Banyuls wine, birthplace of Aristide Maillol.
- Céret, considered to be one of the birthplaces of cubism, hosts several museums among which the Musée d'Art Moderne.
- Collioure, considered to be one of the famous places of fauvism.
- Força Réal, ruined mountaintop fortress.
- Prades, site of the Catalan Summer University (Universitat Catalana d'Estiu).
- Prats de Mollo, important defensive castle of the 17th century facing south to the Pyrenees.
- Salses, important defensive castle of the 16th century, on the ancient frontier with Spain.

Pyrénées-Orientales has two notable sports teams: USA Perpignan (rugby union) and Catalans Dragons (rugby league).

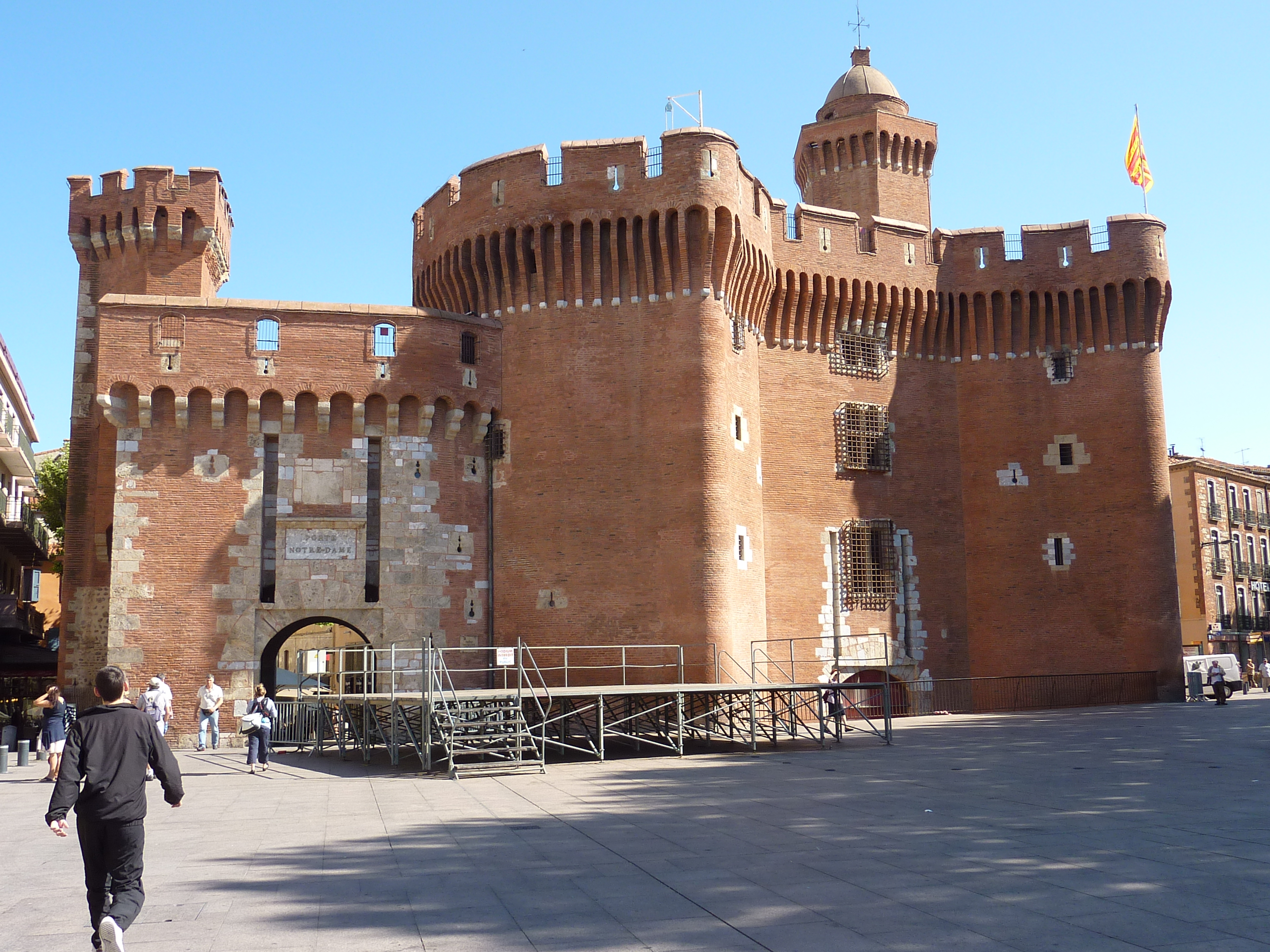
Perpignan

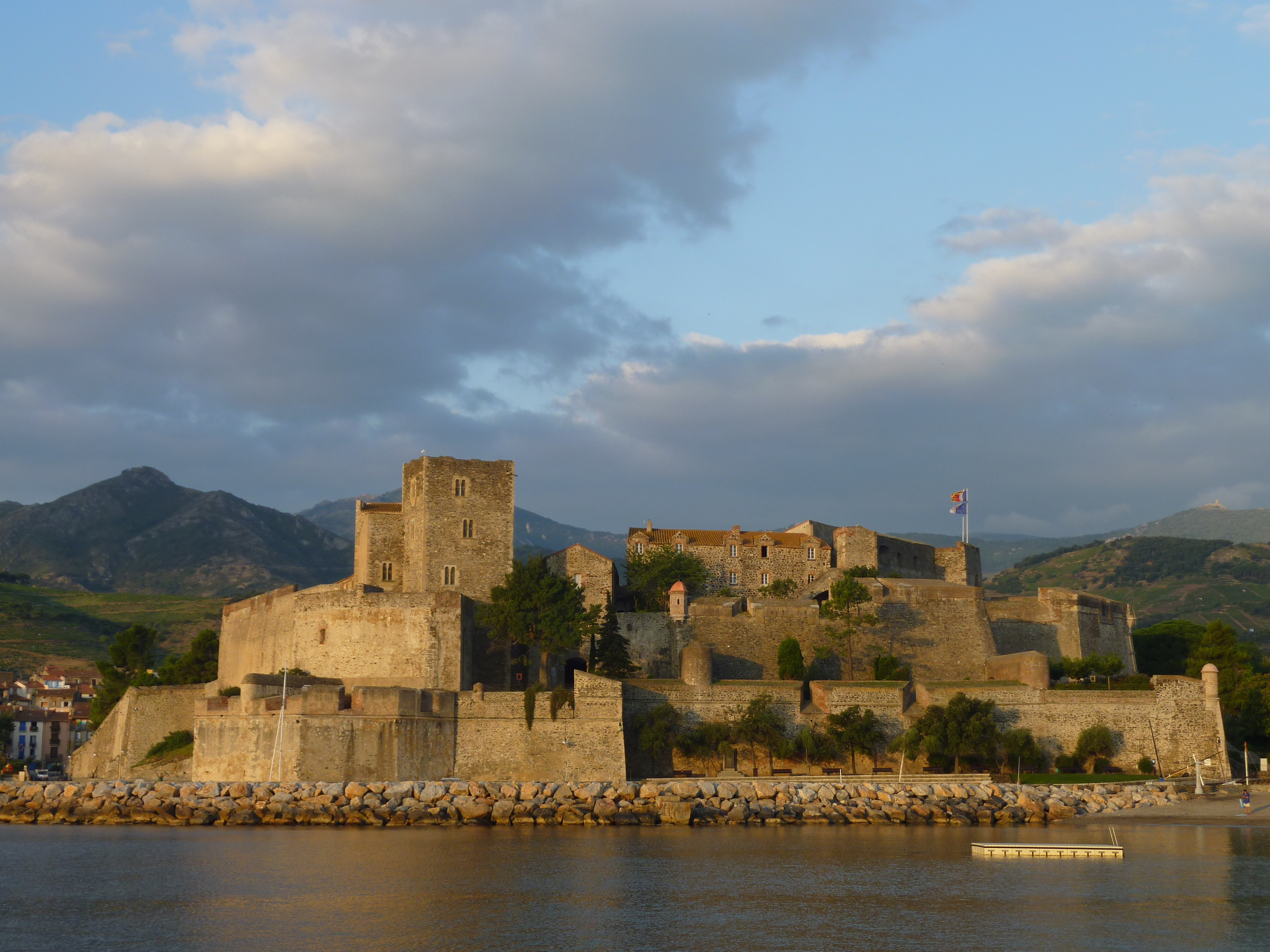
Château Royal de Collioure

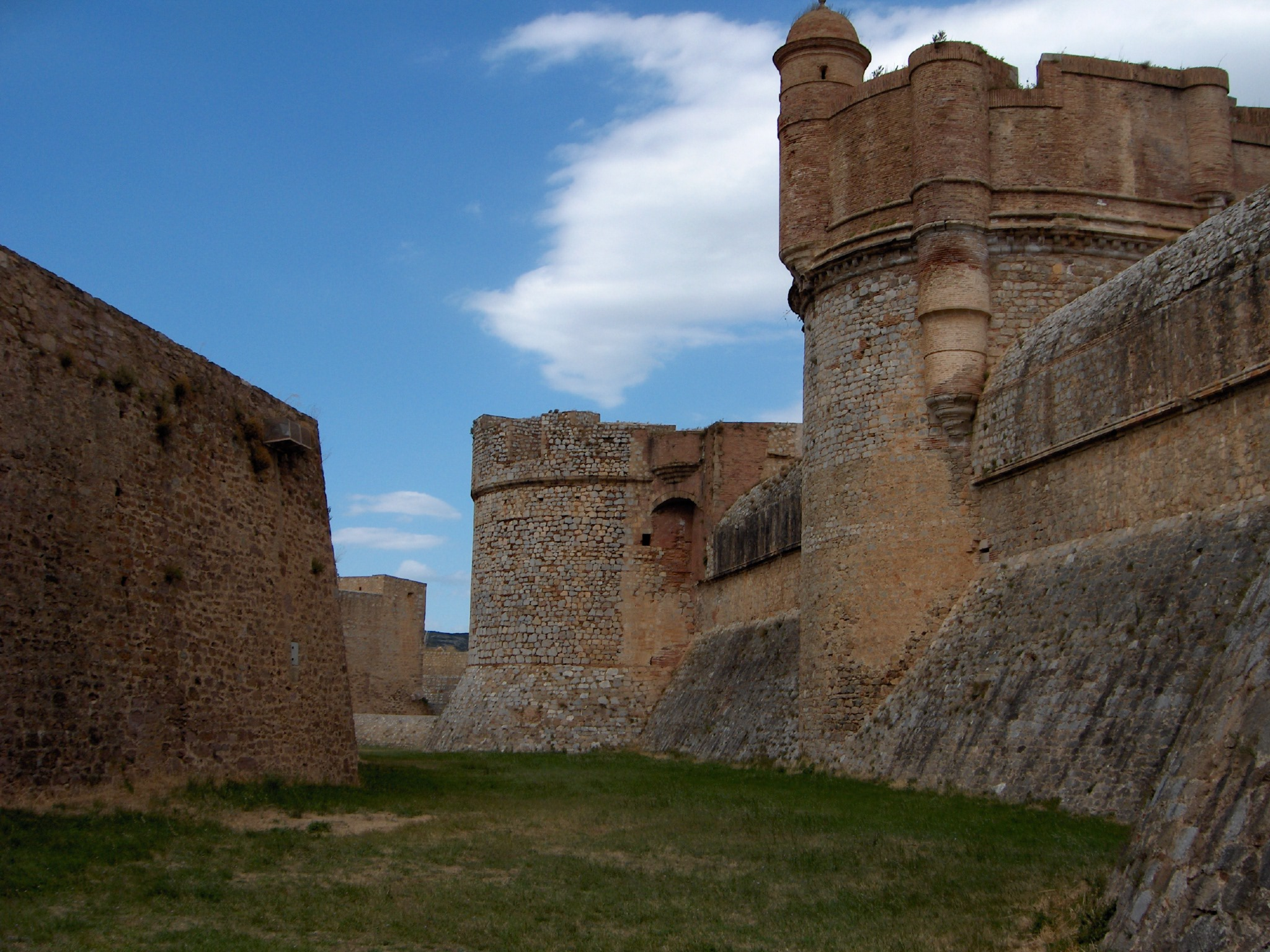
Fort de Salses

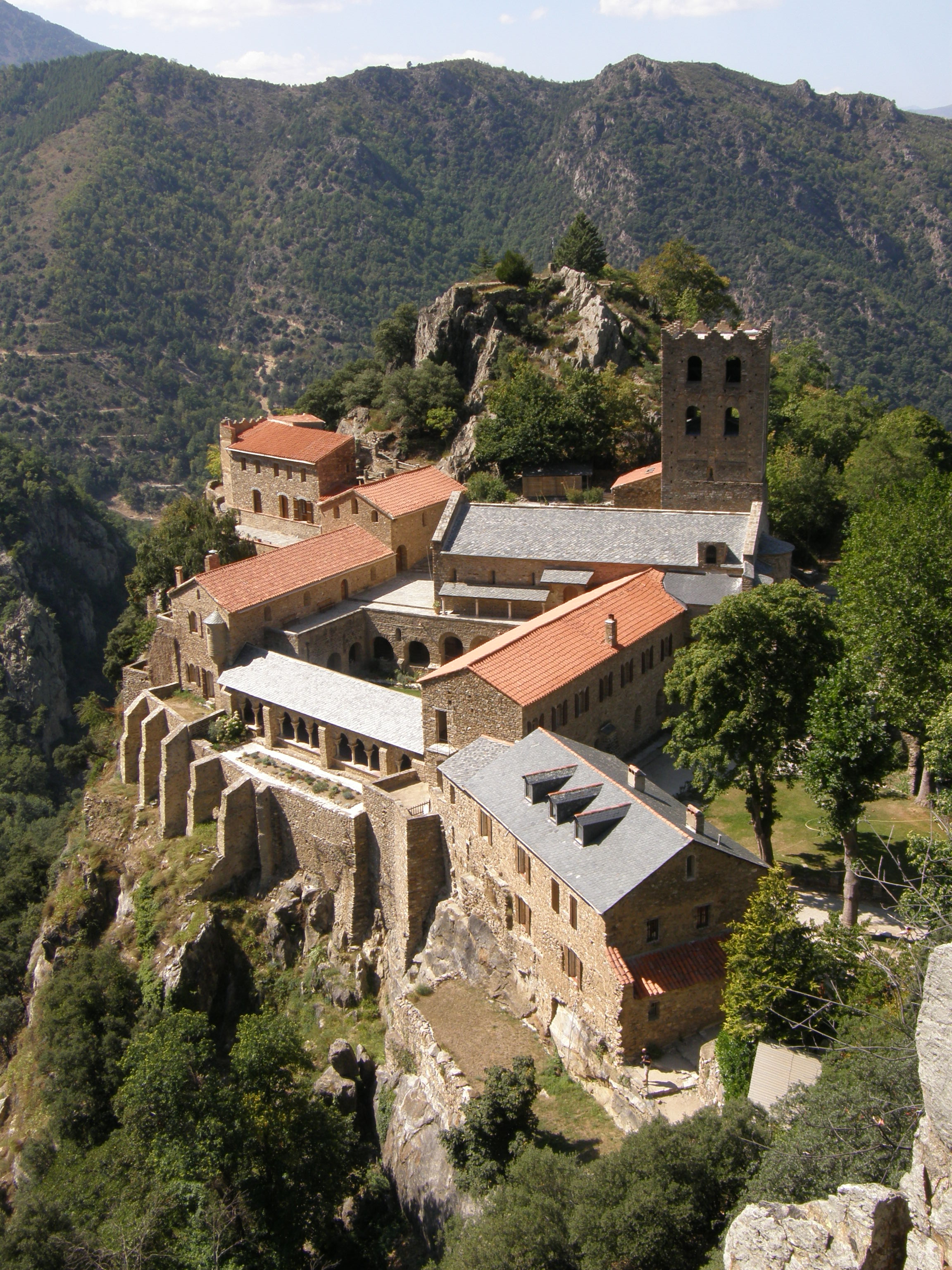
Saint-Martin-du-Canigou abbey

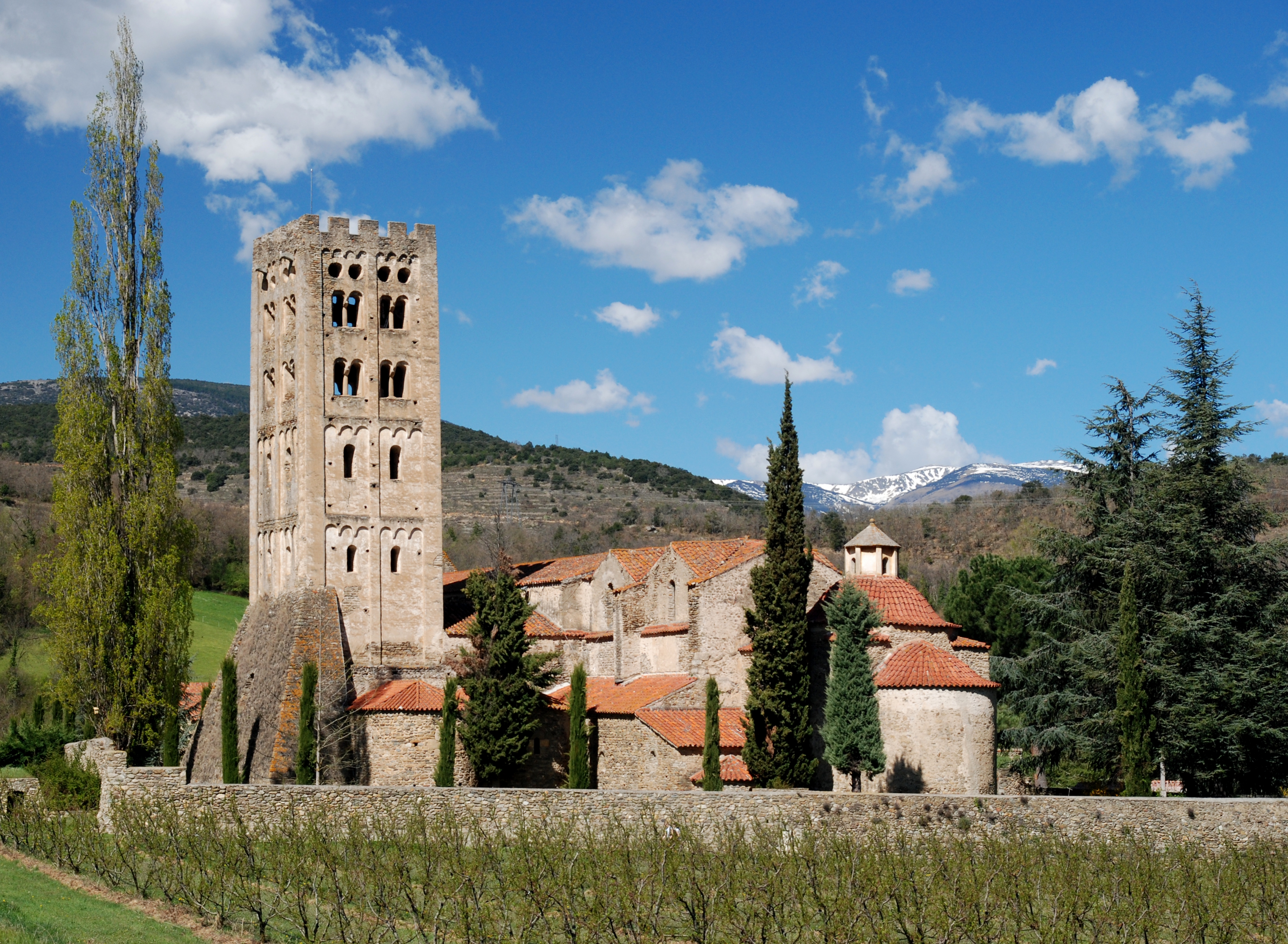
Saint-Michel-de-Cuxa abbey

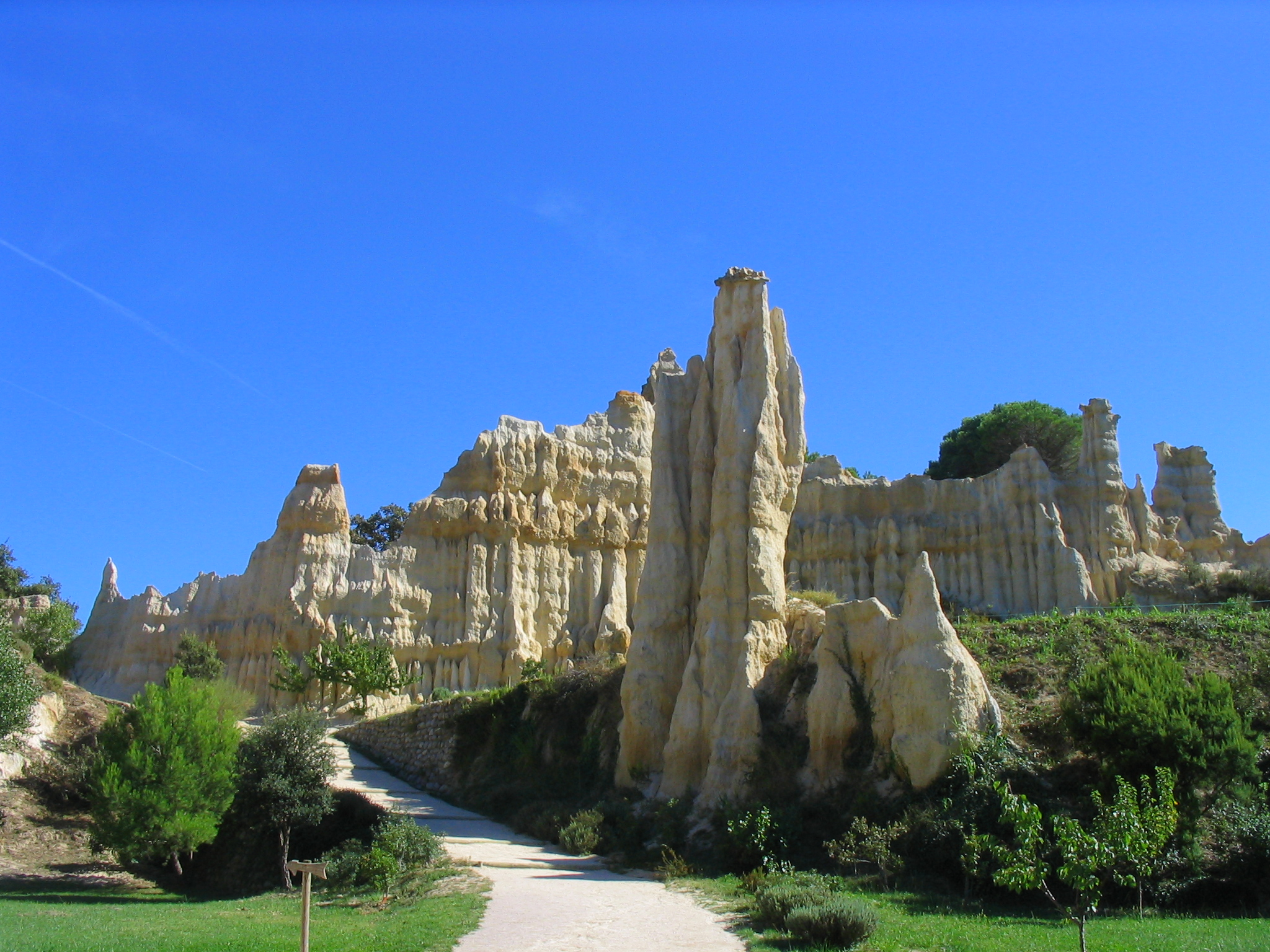
The "organ" of Ille-sur-Têt

== See also ==
- Intercommunalities of the Pyrénées-Orientales department
- Saint-Felix of Ropidera Church
- Megalithic sites in Pyrénées-Orientales
- The Siureda dolmen

== Bibliography ==
- Mann, Jane; Hareng, Kate (2010). Absolutely Almost all you need to know about the Pyrénées-Orientales. Saint-Estève (Pyrénées-Orientales): Presses littéraires. ISBN 978-2-35073-368-5. OCLC 667612113.
- Cárdenas, Fabricio (2014). 66 petites histoires du Pays Catalan [66 Little Stories of Catalan Country] (in French). Perpignan: Ultima Necat. ISBN 978-2-36771-006-8.
